= Grassland Ecological Area =

Wetland in California, United States

Designations

Ramsar Wetland
- Official name: Grassland Ecological Area (GEA)
- Designated: February 2, 2005
- Reference no.: 1451

The Grassland Ecological Area, also known as the Grasslands Ecological Area, is a designated Ramsar Site (wetland of international importance) in Central California. It covers an area of 250 square miles (650 km^{2}) along the San Joaquin River in California's Central Valley. The wetlands are on the Pacific Flyway, and are an important habitat for resident and migratory waterbirds.

It consists of several federal and state protected areas. The federal protected areas are managed together as the San Luis National Wildlife Refuge Complex.

National wildlife refuges, managed by the United States Fish and Wildlife Service (USFWS)

- San Luis National Wildlife Refuge
- Merced National Wildlife Refuge
- San Joaquin River National Wildlife Refuge

Federal wildlife management areas, managed by private owners with conservation easements by the USFWS

- Grasslands Wildlife Management Area

State wildlife areas, managed by the California Department of Fish and Wildlife

- North Grasslands Wildlife Area (Salt Slough, China Island, Gadwall)
- Volta Wildlife Area
- Los Banos Wildlife Area (Los Banos, Mud Slough)

California State Parks, managed by the California Department of Parks and Recreation

- Great Valley Grasslands State Park
