= San Luis National Wildlife Refuge Complex =

Four protected areas in California, US

The San Luis National Wildlife Refuge Complex is located in the northern San Joaquin Valley, within Merced County and Stanislaus County of California, United States. The complex, with four federal National Wildlife Refuges, is managed by the U.S Fish & Wildlife Service.

== Introduction ==
The complex is composed of the San Luis National Wildlife Refuge, Merced National Wildlife Refuge, San Joaquin River National Wildlife Refuge, and the Grasslands Wildlife Management Area. The complex consists of nearly 45,000 acres (180 km^{2}) of wetlands, grasslands, and riparian habitats, as well as over 90,000 acres (360 km^{2}) of conservation easements on private lands for the protection and benefit of wildlife. The complex is headquartered in Los Banos, California and uses the Sierra National Forest Emergency Communication Center located in Fresno, California for emergency dispatch.

The complex is located within the Pacific Flyway, a major route for migrating birds, including waterfowl. The extensive wetlands of the complex and surrounding lands provide habitat for up to a million waterfowl that arrive here each winter. Of the 30 species of waterfowl using the complex, the most common include Ross's geese, Aleutian cackling geese, snow geese, green-winged teal, mallards, northern pintails, gadwalls, American wigeons, northern shovelers, and greater white-fronted geese.

The complex is an integral part of a mosaic of federal, state, and private lands in Merced and Stanislaus Counties that together constitute the largest contiguous freshwater wetlands remaining in California. This area has been recognized as a Ramsar Wetland of International Importance, an Audubon Important Bird Area, and as a Western Hemisphere Shorebird Reserve Network site.

== Wildlife refuge units ==
=== San Luis National Wildlife Refuge ===
The San Luis National Wildlife Refuge encompasses over 26,600 acres (108 km^{2}) of wetlands, riparian forests, native grasslands and vernal pools. A thriving population of tule elk is showcased by one of three auto tour routes. The refuge is host to significant assemblages of birds, mammals, reptiles, amphibians, insects and plants; some of which, such as the California tiger salamander and San Joaquin kit fox, are endangered species.

In 1966, the first parcel of the refuge was purchased with Federal Duck Stamp funds to provide a sanctuary for migratory waterfowl. Over the years the refuge has steadily grown in size and today it comprises six contiguous units: San Luis, East Bear Creek, West Bear Creek, Freitas, Blue Goose, and Kesterson. The San Joaquin River bisects the eastern portion of the refuge.

The refuge is a major wintering ground and migratory stopover point for large concentrations of waterfowl, shorebirds and other waterbirds. Large flocks of northern shovelers, mallards, gadwalls, wigeons, green-winged teal, cinnamon teal, northern pintails, ring-billed ducks, canvasbacks, ruddy ducks, snow geese, Ross's geese, and greater white-fronted geese swarm over the mosaic of seasonal, and permanent wetlands that comprise a quarter of the refuge. Waterfowl generally remain until mid-April before beginning their journey north to breeding areas. Some mallards, gadwalls, and cinnamon teal stay through the spring and summer and breed on the refuge.

Shorebirds including sandpipers and plovers can be found in the tens of thousands from autumn through spring. Large flocks of dunlin, long-billed dowitchers, least sandpipers and western sandpipers can be found feeding in shallow seasonal wetlands, whereas flocks of long-billed curlews are found using both wetlands and grasslands. Over 25 species of shorebirds have been documented at the San Luis NWR.

The San Luis NWR has played a key role in the recovery of the tule elk, a non-migratory elk subspecies found only in California. Prior to the mid-19th century, an estimated 500,000 tule elk lived in California. Due to over-hunting and loss of natural habitat, they were nearly driven to extinction by the turn of the 20th century – by some accounts, the population was down to 10-20 individuals. In 1974 a herd of 18 animals was established in a large enclosure at the San Luis NWR and has since thrived. Elk from this herd are periodically relocated to establish new or join other tule elk herds throughout California. A true wildlife recovery success story, the statewide tule elk population has recovered to over 4,000 animals.

Less well-known are the extensive upland habitats found on the refuge. Many of these habitats are characterized by saline or alkaline conditions which are accentuated by the low rainfall and arid conditions that characterize the San Joaquin Valley. These habitats support a rich botanical community of native bunchgrasses, native and exotic annual grasses, forbs, and native shrubs. Trees, such as the valley oak, cottonwood, and willow are found along riparian corridors. In these areas, visitors might encounter coyotes, desert cottontails, ground squirrels, western meadowlarks, yellow-billed magpies, loggerhead shrikes, as well as northern harriers and white-tailed kites coursing over the vegetation and other raptors. Great blue herons, great egrets, and white-faced ibises are frequently sighted throughout the refuge.

The refuge has three auto tour routes with associated nature trails and observation decks for the public to view and photograph wildlife and nature. The refuge also allows fishing at designated sites and has a large waterfowl hunting program.

=== Merced National Wildlife Refuge ===
The Merced National Wildlife Refuge is within Merced County. It is divided into four units: Merced Unit, Arena Plains Unit, Snowbird Unit and Lonetree Unit.

It encompasses 10,262 acres (42 km^{2}) of wetlands, native grasslands, vernal pools, and riparian zone areas. It was established in 1951 under the Lea Act to attract wintering waterfowl from adjacent farmland where their foraging was causing crop damage. In the last few decades, changes in agricultural practices and refuge management have reduced these wildlife/crop issues.

The refuge plays host to the largest wintering populations of lesser sandhill cranes and Ross's geese within the Pacific Flyway. Each autumn over 20,000 cranes and 60,000 arctic-nesting geese terminate their annual migrations from Alaska and Canada to make the refuge home for six months. Here they mingle with thousands of other visiting waterfowl, waterbirds and shorebirds making the refuge a true winter phenomenon.

The refuge also provides an important breeding habitat for Swainson's hawks, tricolored blackbirds, marsh wrens, mallards, gadwalls, cinnamon teal, and burrowing owls. Tricolored blackbirds, a colonial-nesting songbird, breed in colonies of over 25,000 pairs. Coyotes, ground squirrels, desert cottontails, beavers, and long-tailed weasels can also be seen year-round.

Vernal pools are another type of wetland found on the Merced NWR. These special pools form when natural shallow depressions underlaid with clay soils fill with winter rainwater. The pools come to life as they fill with water: fairy and tadpole shrimp emerge from cysts embedded in the soils the previous year. The endangered tiger salamander, along with other amphibians lay eggs and rear tadpoles. The vast number of aquatic invertebrates found in these pools provides a food source for wintering and migrating birds as they prepare for the long flight north to their breeding grounds.

As spring arrives and the water in the vernal pools evaporates, wildflowers – such as goldfields, purple owl's clover, and butter-and-egg – germinate in colorful patterns of thick rings or halos around the pool basins. Once the vernal pools have dried out, Downingia and Colusa grass, a rare California species, appear in the parched basins. This annual coloring led John Muir to describe the valley floor as the "floweriest part of the world" he had seen.

In addition to managing natural habitats, the Merced NWR contains approximately 300 acres (1.2 km^{2}) of cultivated corn and winter wheat crops and over 500 acres (2.0 km^{2}) of irrigated pasture for wildlife. Not only do these managed agricultural areas provide important sources of nutrition (carbohydrates) to the tens of thousands of arctic-nesting geese and sandhill cranes that make Merced County their winter home, they also help ensure that the birds will have adequate nutrient stores to make the long migration to their northern breeding grounds. Local farmers, under agreements with the refuge, oversee the ground preparation, seeding, and irrigation of these croplands. The refuge incorporates a livestock grazing program that works in partnership with local ranchers and farmers. Grazing cattle and sheep is a management tool used by the refuge to help control invasive weeds, provide and maintain short stature grasslands for goose grazing, and encourage native grasslands to thrive

=== San Joaquin River National Wildlife Refuge ===
The San Joaquin River National Wildlife Refuge is located in Stanislaus County and San Joaquin County. It encompasses over 7,000 acres (28 km^{2}) of riparian woodlands, wetlands and grasslands that host a diversity of wildlife native to California's Central Valley. The refuge is situated where three major rivers, the San Joaquin, Tuolumne and Stanislaus Rivers, join providing key wildlife corridor habitat. The refuge was established in 1987 under the Endangered Species Act and the Migratory Bird Treaty Act of 1918.

The refuge has played a major role in the recovery of Aleutian cackling geese by serving as a key wintering area and continues to be of major importance to this species. By 1975, the total population was under 1,000 geese; however, removing nest predators (non-native introduced foxes) from the breeding grounds in Alaska's Aleutian Islands and improving wintering habitat resulted in its delisting as an endangered species and a population well over 100,000 and growing. Restoring wetlands and providing grasslands and croplands at this refuge has provided an ideal wintering habitat for the geese.

It is estimated that 95 percent of the San Joaquin Valley's riparian woodlands were lost during the late 19th and 20th centuries due to changing land and water uses. However, this refuge is in the process of restoring this critical habitat. Within the borders of the San Joaquin NWR is one of California's largest riparian forest habitat restoration projects: 400,000 native trees such as willows, cottonwoods, and oaks have been planted across 1,700 acres (7 km^{2}) of river floodplain creating the largest block of contiguous riparian woodland in the San Joaquin Valley. This important riparian woodland habitat is host to many rare animals. Swainson's hawks nest in the canopy of tall cottonwood trees. Herons and cormorants form communal nesting colonies within the tops of the large oaks. Endangered riparian brush rabbits have been re-introduced to this restored habitat from captive-reared populations. These woodlands also support a diversity of breeding songbirds including grosbeaks, orioles, flycatchers and warblers, as well as least Bell's vireos – a threatened species which last nested in the San Joaquin Valley over 50 years ago.

A wildlife viewing platform along Beckwith Road is a favorite location for viewing the Aleutian cackling geese along with other waterbirds from October through March.

=== Grasslands Wildlife Management Area ===
The Grasslands Wildlife Management Area (GWMA) was established by the U.S. Fish and Wildlife Service in 1979 and is composed of privately owned lands on which perpetual conservation easements have been purchased. These easements preserve wetland and grassland habitats and prevent conversion to croplands or other uses not compatible with migratory birds and other wildlife values. Daily management operations remain under the landowner's control. The majority of easement properties are wetlands managed for waterfowl hunting. From 1979 to date, over 65,000 acres (260 km^{2}) have been placed under conservation easements.

The GWMA is located in western Merced County, California, within the San Joaquin River basin and supports the largest remaining block of contiguous wetlands in the Central Valley. It is divided into an eastern and western division separated by the San Joaquin River. In the heart of the western division is the Grassland Resource Conservation District (GRCD), an area of 70,000 acres (280 km^{2}) of private wetlands and associated grasslands, and over 30,600 acres (124 km^{2}) of federal National Wildlife Refuges and state Wildlife Management Areas.

These private wetlands constitute 30% of the remaining wetlands in California's Central Valley and are extremely important to Pacific Flyway waterfowl populations. Over 60 million duck use-day and 3 million goose use-days occur annually in the GWMA. The wetlands support diverse habitats including seasonally flooded marshlands, semi-permanent marsh, riparian habitat, wet meadows, vernal pools, native uplands, pastures, and native grasslands. This habitat diversity supports raptors, shorebirds, wading birds, and other wildlife species. Several federal and state-listed, endangered, and threatened plants and animals are present in the area and benefit from the habitat protection provided by the easement program.

== See also ==
- Parks in the San Joaquin Valley
- Natural history of the Central Valley (California)
