= Michael Basinger =

American football player (born 1951)

No. 71
- Position: Defensive lineman

Personal information
- Born: December 11, 1951 (age 74); Merced, California, U.S.
- Listed height: 6 ft 3 in (1.91 m)
- Listed weight: 258 lb (117 kg)

Career information
- High school: Los Banos (Los Banos, California)
- College: Gavilan JC (1970–1971); UC Riverside (1972–1973)
- NFL draft: 1974: undrafted

Career history
- Green Bay Packers (1974); Manitowoc County Chiefs (1974); New England Patriots (1975)*
- * Offseason or practice squad member only

Career NFL statistics
- Games played: 1
- Stats at Pro Football Reference

Michael Joe Basinger (born December 11, 1951) is an American former professional football player. He played college football as a defensive lineman for the Gavilan Rams and UC Riverside Highlanders. After college, he was a member of the Green Bay Packers and the New England Patriots of the National Football League (NFL). He only appeared in one NFL game, with the Packers.

== Early life ==
Basinger was born on December 11, 1951, in Merced, California. He attended Los Banos High School where he played football and baseball. He played as a defensive lineman in football and helped Los Banos to a co-share of the Mountain Valley Conference title as a senior in 1969, being selected first-team all-league. In baseball, he had a batting average of .425 in his career and scored 16 home runs and 67 runs batted in. Basinger initially accepted a football scholarship to play for Abilene Christian College, but ended up not attending there and instead enrolled at Gavilan College in 1970.

== College career ==
At Gavilan, Basinger played both football and baseball. He was used as a defensive lineman and placekicker in football, while he played as an infielder in baseball. He was selected All-Coast Conference as a freshman with the baseball team. In his sophomore season on the football team, he was named Gavilan's most valuable defensive lineman and was selected All-Coast Conference. He was also a junior college All-American.

After two years at Gavilan, Basinger transferred to the University of Texas at El Paso (UTEP) in 1972. Shortly after deciding on UTEP, he decided that he did not like the school and transferred to the University of California, Riverside, where he joined Wayne Howard, his football coach from Gavilan. He was used at each defensive line position and played two years under Howard at UC Riverside as a starter, being named the team's most valuable lineman each year, despite being limited by a shoulder injury suffered in a car crash in 1972. He said that prior to his senior season, after performing poorly in front of scouts and due to financial issues, he considered quitting football. However, after talking with the team's defensive line coach, Sam Moore, he decided to stay playing football, and he was named All-California Collegiate Athletic Association (CCAA) for the 1973 season. He helped UC Riverside compile a record of 8–2 in the 1973 season and was invited to the East–West Shrine Game after the season. Coming from a small school, Basinger said that "I went bananas" upon learning that he was selected for the game. He was the first Shrine Game participant in UC Riverside history, as well as only the second from the CCAA all-time.

== Professional career and later life ==
After going unselected in the 1974 NFL draft, Basinger signed with the Green Bay Packers as an undrafted free agent. He impressed coach Dan Devine and initially made the final roster for the 1974 season. He made his NFL debut in Week 1 against the Minnesota Vikings, but was released three days later, stating that he was "puzzled" at the team's decision. After being released by the Packers, he signed with the Manitowoc County Chiefs of the Central States Football League, helping them reach the league championship.

In the off-season, Basinger worked as a grocery store manager in Stockton, California. He signed with the New England Patriots of the NFL in early 1975. However, on July 20, 1975, he announced his retirement from professional football. He finished his NFL career having appeared in one game.

After football, Basinger became a country music singer and songwriter. He had been in a rock band in high school and majored in music in college. He began singing country music in 1978 and began writing songs in 1983. By 1986, he had written 54 songs and helped write "The Lady of the World", which placed on the top 100 country songs chart. That year, he said he was writing and playing "honky tonks" in Nashville, Tennessee, earning $30 per night, while also working in construction.
