= Thomas Hutchins (naturalist) =

British physician and naturalist

Thomas Hutchins FRSE (1742? – 7 July 1790) was a British physician and naturalist.

== Life ==
Hutchins was employed as Hudson's Bay Company surgeon at York Factory (Manitoba) 1766–1773 then Governor of Albany fort (Ontario) 1774–1782. By all accounts, he was a conscientious and hard-working physician but found time for research including a study of local edible plants useful for prevention of scurvy.

He was visited 1768–1769 by astronomer William Wales, who had been sent by the Royal Society to observe the 1769 transit of Venus, and was left equipment and instructions for recording meteorological data.

Encouraged by his acting chief Andrew Graham 1771–1772, he kept notes on wildlife, including descriptions of species not previously recorded.

At the behest of the Royal Society, he made useful observations on magnetic declination at Albany 1775–1776.

He performed preliminary experiments on the congelation (freezing point) of mercury in 1775, identifying the problem with previous attempts as being due to the abrupt change of volume of the mercury in the thermometer as it changed state. Apparatus for an improved method was devised and after a series of careful experiments 1779–1782, its freezing point was determined at −39 °F. For this work, highly praised by Cavendish, he was awarded the Royal Society's Copley Medal in 1783, jointly with John Goodricke (for unrelated work).

He served the Hudson's Bay Company for the rest of his life in London as corresponding secretary.

It is probable that much of the nature notes for which he was also highly praised was actually the work of Andrew Graham, either generously given or plagiarised, an action not considered so reprehensible in those days.

In 1784 he was elected a Fellow of the Royal Society of Edinburgh. His proposers were John McGowan, John Robison and Very Rev John Walker.

He died on 7 July 1790.

Hutchins' goose (Branta hutchinsii) was named for him
