= Great Valley Grasslands State Park =

Protected native grassland in California, USA

- Location within California Location within the United States
- Location: Merced County, California, United States
- Nearest city: Gustine, California
- Coordinates: 37°16′58″N 120°52′2″W
- Area: 2,826 acres (1,144 ha)
- Established: 1982
- Governing body: California Department of Parks and Recreation

Great Valley Grasslands State Park is a state park of California, United States, preserving a parcel of remnant native grassland in the San Joaquin Valley. Such a temperate grasslands, savannas, and shrublands biome was once widespread throughout the whole Central Valley. The 2,826-acre (1,144 ha) park was established in 1982. Largely undeveloped, it was formed by combining two former state park units: San Luis Island and Fremont Ford State Recreation Area. Its chief attractions for visitors are spring wildflowers, fishing, and wildlife watching.

== Grassland Ecological Area ==
The park is part of the larger Grasslands Ecological Area (GEA), a 160,000-acre complex (65,000 ha) of federal, state, and private lands dedicated to wildlife conservation. The GEA contains habitats such as vernal pools, marshes, wet meadows, and grasslands. Dozens of waterbird species overwinter in the area. Water is provided by controlled canals, mimicking the winter and spring flooding that originally characterized the San Joaquin River watershed.

== Flora and fauna ==
Plant species in the park include native bunchgrasses such as alkali sacaton and endangered herbs including delta button celery. Rare animal species include the vernal pool fairy shrimp and San Joaquin tadpole shrimp of seasonal wetlands, and amphibian species such as the California tiger salamander. The park is one of the few remaining places in the San Joaquin Valley where the giant garter snake can be found, as wetland loss has led to its near-elimination from the valley since 1980.

Notable bird species that overwinter in the park include the sandhill crane, western sandpiper, dunlin, 19 species of ducks, and 6 species of geese.

== See also ==
- List of California native plants
- List of California state parks
- List of protected grasslands of North America
