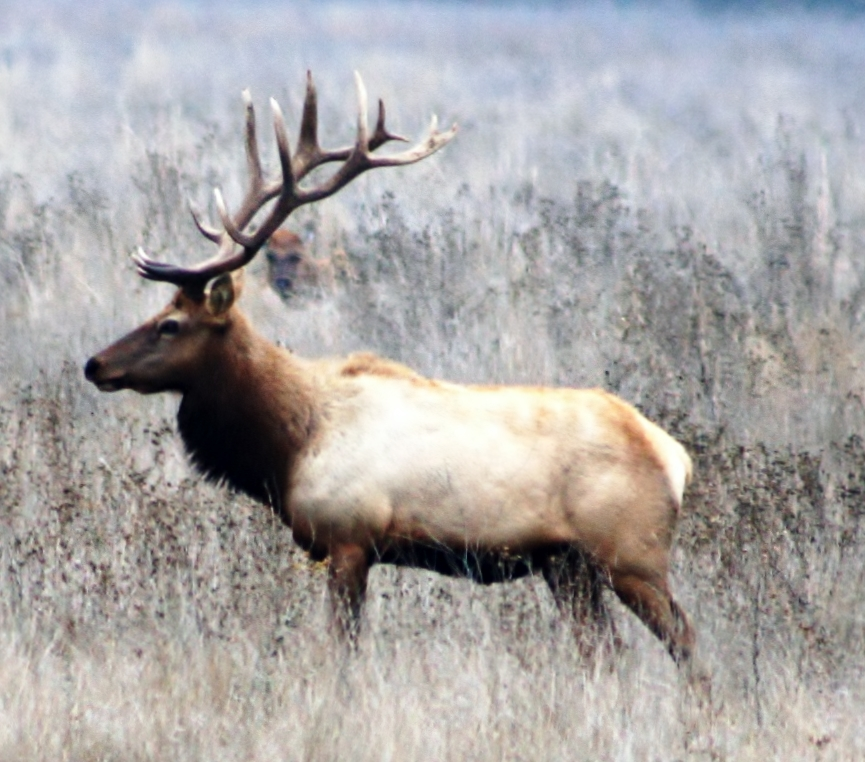
- Tule elk bull at San Luis National Wildlife Refuge
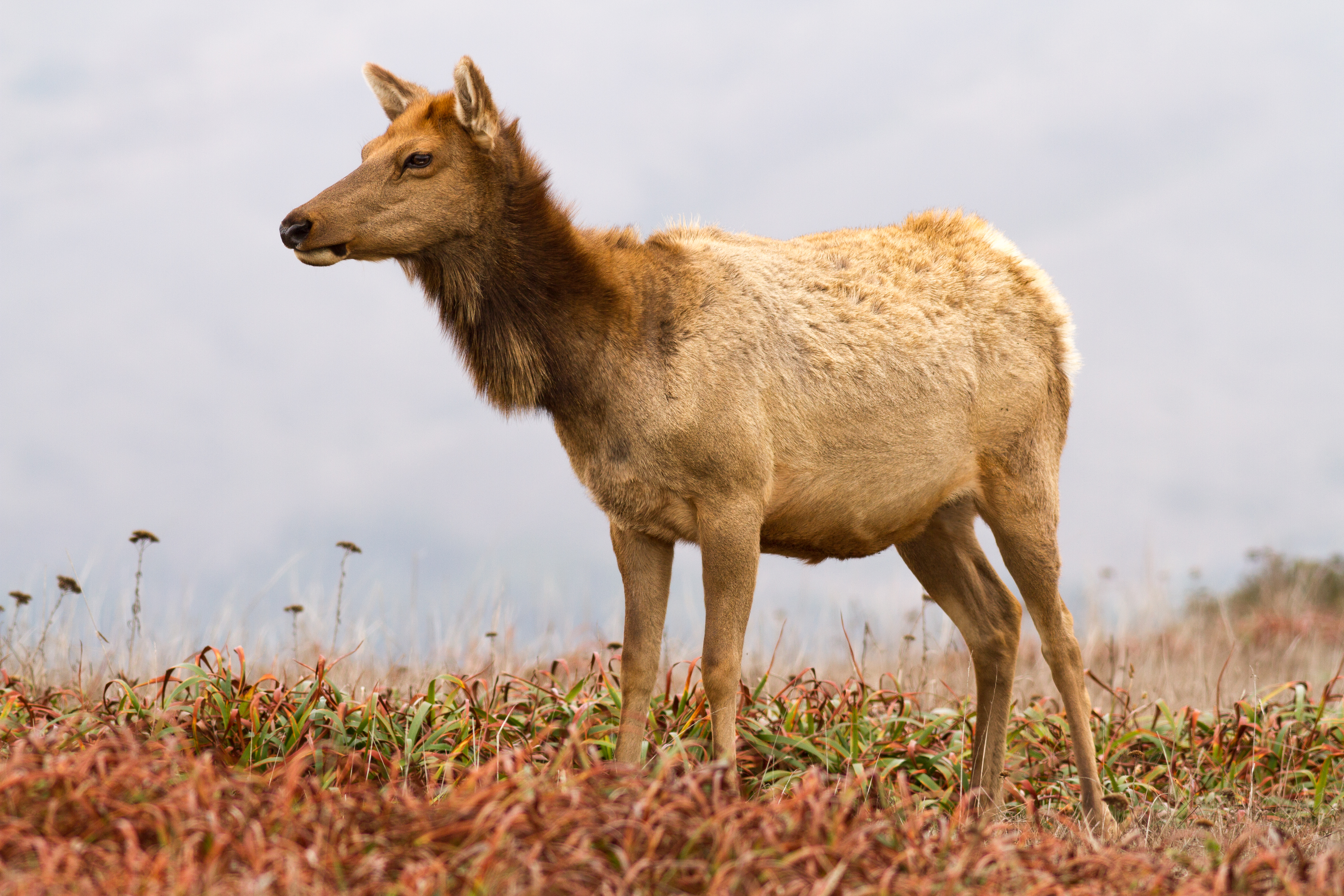
- Tule elk cow at Tomales Point, Point Reyes National Seashore
- Vulnerable (NatureServe)

Scientific classification
- Kingdom: Animalia
- Phylum: Chordata
- Class: Mammalia
- Order: Artiodactyla
- Family: Cervidae
- Genus: Cervus
- Species: C. canadensis
- Subspecies: C. c. nannodes

Trinomial name
- Cervus canadensis nannodes (Merriam, 1905)

Synonyms
- Cervus elaphus nannodes; Cervus nannodes

= Tule elk =

Subspecies of mammal

The tule elk (Cervus canadensis nannodes) is a subspecies of elk found only in California, ranging from the grasslands and marshlands of the Central Valley to the grassy hills on the coast. When the Europeans first arrived, an estimated 500,000 tule elk roamed these regions, but by 1870 they were thought to be extirpated. In 1874–1875 a single breeding pair was discovered in the tule marshes of Buena Vista Lake in the southern San Joaquin Valley. Conservation measures were taken to protect the species in the 1970s.

They are considered the smallest subspecies of elk, which is reflected in the alternative name "dwarf elk" and their scientific name, which means "dwarf". However, some individuals have grown to the size of Roosevelt elk, the largest elk subspecies. Herds typically included around hundreds of individuals, though several herds may have included thousands of elk.

Initially, tule elk extended southwards to Orange County and may have roamed extreme western Nevada. When Spanish arrived, tule elk populations fell as a result of competition with livestock, habitat loss, and overhunting. Tule elk were believed to have gone extinct by 1873, the year when elk hunting was banned. Once they were rediscovered, efforts by ranchers in the 20th century aided in the tule elk's survival.

== Taxonomy ==
The tule elk was identified by Clinton Hart Merriam as a distinct species Cervus nannodes in 1905 from a 2-year old bull from Buttonwillow, California. Merriam placed the tule elk in a separate species, commenting on its paler fur, smaller size, and shorter legs compared to other elk. He reported some affinity between the tule elk and the Rocky Mountain elk based on a comparison of skulls.

A taxonomic revision by British naturalist Richard Lydekker placed the tule elk and other elk in the species Cervus canadensis. He classified elk from the White Mountains and Mogollon Mountains as extinct populations of tule elk, though modern taxonomists classify these populations as a subspecies named Merriam's elk. Many naturalists classified the elk as various subspecies of red deer, following Johann Erxleben's initial description. Mitochondrial DNA studies conducted in 2004 strongly indicated elk are a separate species from red deer.

Genetic studies based on mitochondrial and nuclear DNA confirm that tule elk, Roosevelt elk and Rocky Mountain elk should be considered distinct subspecies. A 2007 nuclear DNA microsatellite study found single alleles at many loci, with a maximum of five alleles at one locus, indicating that there has either been a mutation at this locus subsequent to the single breeding pair reported by Henry Miller and nineteenth century game warden A. C. Tibbet, or there were three surviving tule elk at the 1800s genetic bottleneck. Another microsatellite study in 2016 found no more than four alleles at any locus, consistent with tule elk having been reduced to a single breeding pair. The subspecific epithet nannodes means "dwarf", in reference to the tule elk's small size. The subspecies name derives from the tule (/ˈtuːliː/), a species of sedge native to freshwater marshes where a few remaining animals were discovered.

== Description ==
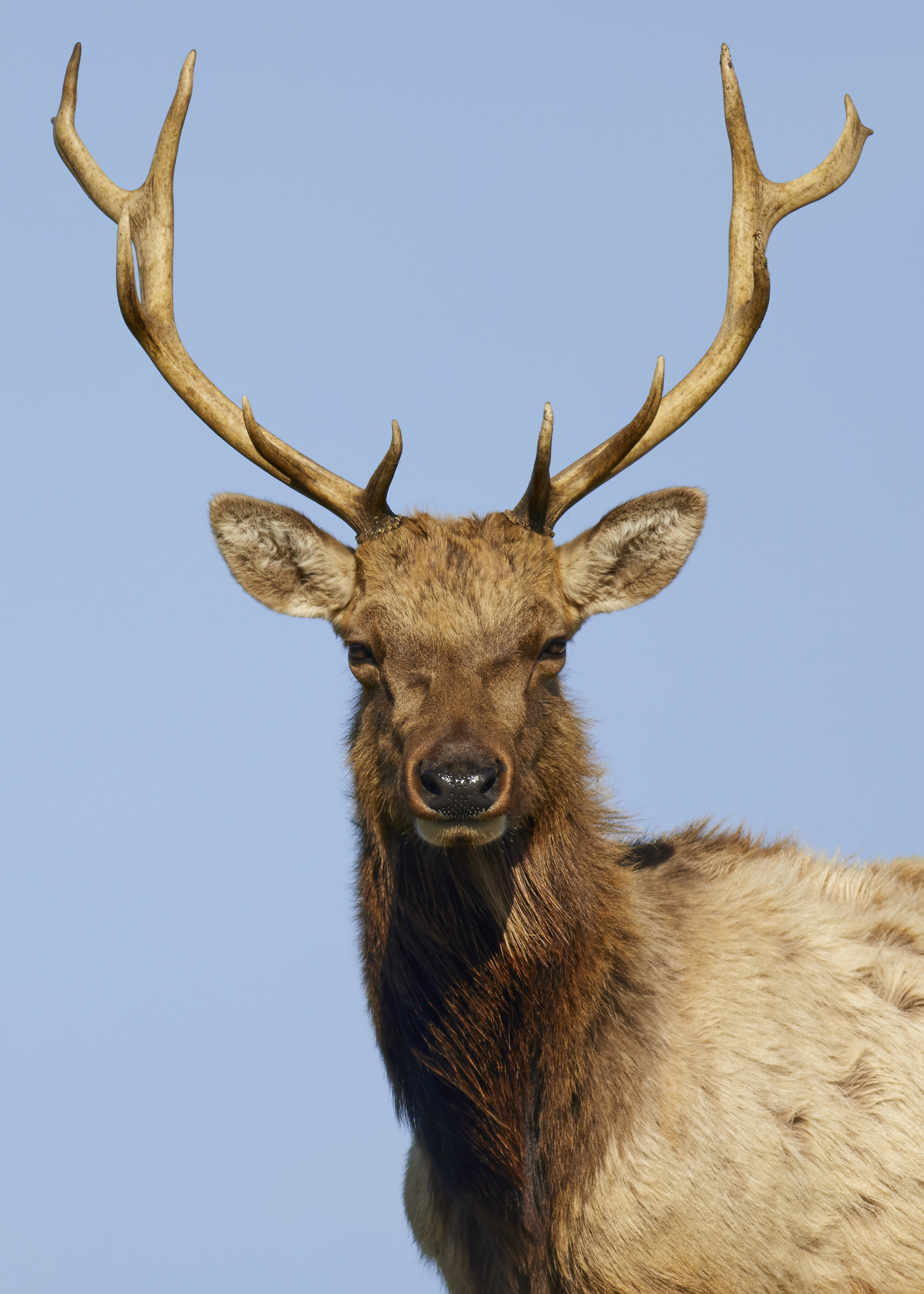
A tule elk bull at Point Reyes National Seashore in 2018

Considered the smallest of the elk subspecies in North America, the tule elk were the dominant large ungulate in California prior to the arrival of the Spanish. The average weight of adult males is 450 to 550 lb (200 to 250 kg) and females have an average of 375 to 425 lb (170 to 193 kg). Although tule elk have been reported as half the size of the Roosevelt elk (C. c. roosevelti), and sometimes referred to as the dwarf elk, this moniker may be misleading as the smaller size of some tule elk may reflect poor nutrition of elk subsisting on marginal habitat such as the Owens River watershed. California Department of Fish and Wildlife records show recent tule elk bulls on Grizzly Island in Suisun Bay weigh up to 900 pounds (410 kg). This is a similar size to Roosevelt elk bulls which weigh between 700 pounds (320 kg) and 1,100 pounds (500 kg). Wildlife biologist Dale McCullough described a elk transplanted from Buttonwillow in the San Joaquin Valley to a golf course in Monterey that grew to the size of a Rocky Mountain elk. Also hunter H. C. Banta described the tule elk in the 1850s as "I found no difference in size between these elk and the Oregon, Washington, Wyoming and Colorado elk, and felt sure that the bulls would weight 700 to 800 pounds".

The calves are similar to deer fawns, with brown coats and white spots. Tule elk herd size likely numbered in the several hundreds historically. Joseph Warren Revere, the grandson of Revolutionary War patriot Paul Revere, wrote in his book Naval Duty in California that he counted 400 elk in a single herd on Pt. Reyes in the 1840s. Stephen J. Richardson, son of Marin County pioneer Captain William A. Richardson, wrote "I think the largest herd in the world roamed over the deep grasslands of Point Reyes...I fully believe there were a thousand elk in one herd." General John Bidwell of the 1841 Bartleson–Bidwell Party wrote: "In some of the fertile valleys, such as Napa and Santa Clara, there were elk literally by the thousand".

== Biology ==
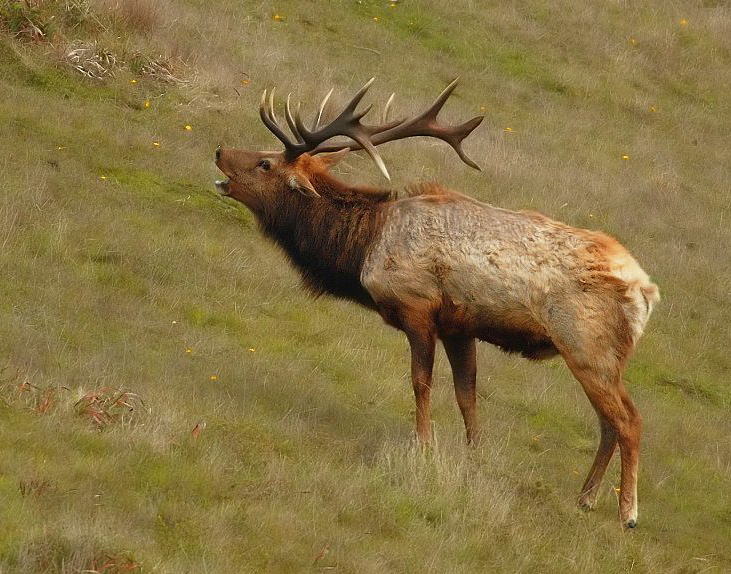
Making rutting call or "bugle"

=== Diet ===
Two male and eight female elk were translocated from Merced County, California to Tomales Point on Point Reyes National Seashore in March 1978. The elk showed signs of nutritional stress including copper deficiency and antler anomalies by summer 1979 and two elk died. One explanation was molybdenum which expresses as copper deficiency. A former molybdenum mine existed in that area of the Point Reyes National Seashore. Other possible explanations include failure to remove cattle until 1979 and the fact that 1977 and 1978 were drought years. Birth rates remained negligible until 1981, when they began reproducing at predicted maximum rates. Studies of fecal material documented that the tule elk preferred grasses and forbs with little use of shrubs such as willow. These results are consistent with findings on the Diablo Range, Santa Clara County elk herd where more than 50% of the tule elk diet were grasses.

A 2007 study at the Tomales Point Elk Reserve showed that tule elk appear to play a critical role in preventing succession of open grasslands to less diverse, shrub-dominated ecosystems. Wapiti grazing had a positive impact on native grassland species abundance and diversity, and seemed to increase the richness and abundance of some exotic taxa while reducing Holcus lanatus—a highly invasive exotic grass which is a major problem in mesic perennial grasslands.

=== Pathology ===
Small numbers of tule elk in Point Reyes have tested positive for Mycobacterium avium subsp. paratuberculosis or "MAP", a wasting disease known as Johne's Disease. The bacteria was apparently transmitted by dairy cattle or spraying of cattle manure on pasturelands. In 2016 more tule elk tested positive after being euthanized so that their gut tissue could be analyzed. Cattle transmitted the disease to the Tomales Point elk herd shortly after they were first established there in 1978.

== Distribution and habitat ==
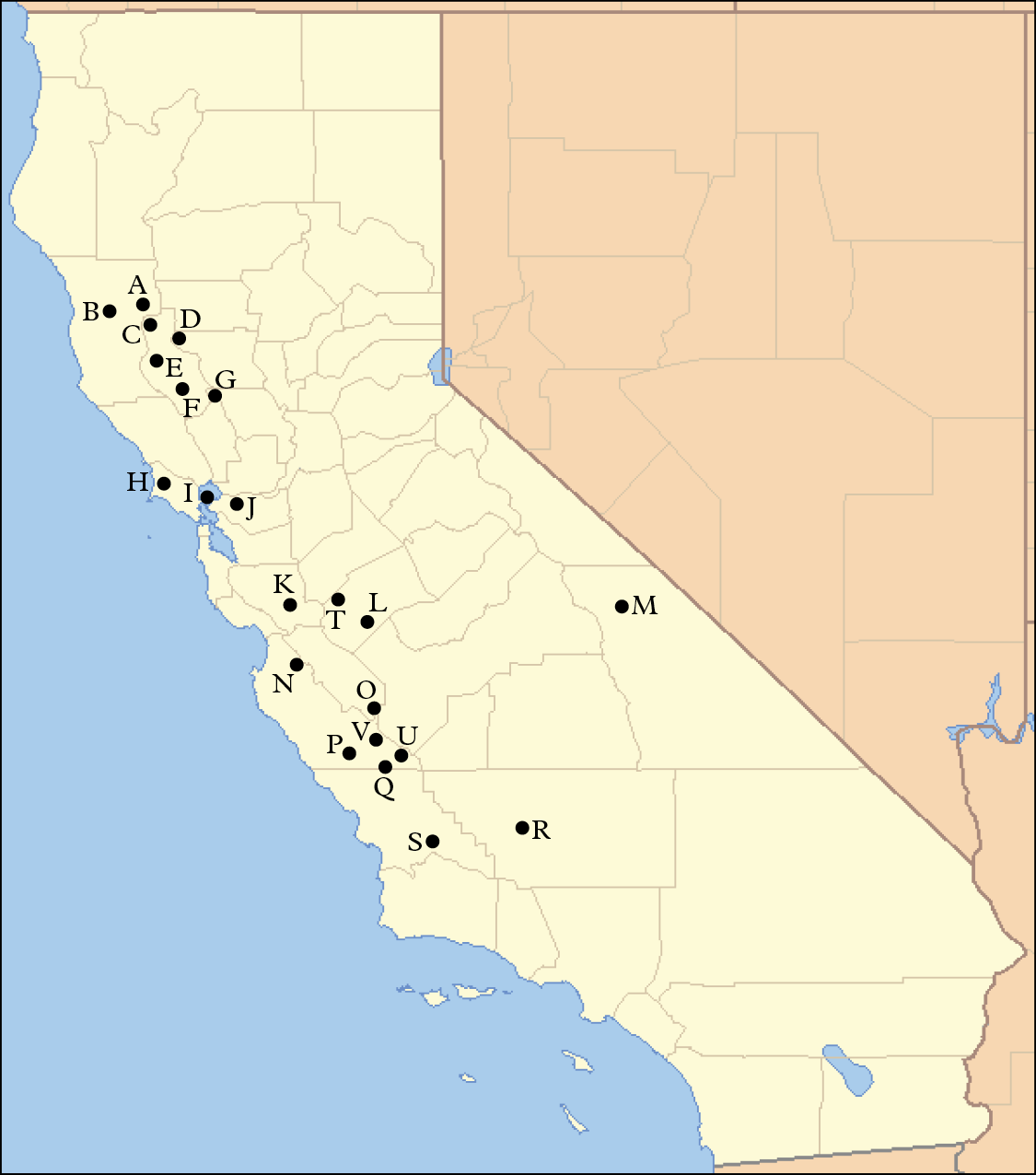
Distribution of the tule elk in 1994

Tule elk are found exclusively in California and are spotted in Carrizo Plain National Monument, Point Reyes National Seashore, portions of the Owens Valley from Lone Pine to Bishop, Coyote Ridge in Santa Clara Valley, San Jose, California and in Pacheco State Park and areas surrounding San Luis Reservoir near Los Banos, California.

Historically, they ranged from Orange County to the Sierra Nevada and possibly extreme western Nevada. McCullough identified nineteenth century tule elk antler specimens collected in three separate locations north of the San Francisco Bay: Sonoma in Sonoma County, as well as San Geronimo and Tomales both in Marin County.

== Conservation status ==
Before European colonization, the overall tule elk population composed of more than 500,000 individuals. After the Spanish arrived, grazing livestock such as cattle and horses were introduced and competed with the native elk for food. Other factors to elk decline included habitat loss and overhunting. By 1873, when elk hunting was banned, tule elk were believed to have gone extinct. In 1874, German American rancher Henry Miller discovered a population consisting of 2–10 elk on his ranch in Bakersfield, and through his efforts, the Tule elk population rose to 28 in 1895.

Miller's herd was transplanted 21 times, with each attempt failing to establish free-ranging herds. Walter Dow transferred 27 head from Yosemite National Park and 28 from Tupman to Owens Valley. This herd thrived in the new habitat and comprised 200 head by 1943. In 1960, the state of California held a hearing to determine how many elk should live in the Owens Valley, and decided elk should be hunted to limit their numbers to under 500 animals.

A private citizen from Los Angeles, Beula Edmiston, formed a group to attempt a preservation program for the Tule elk. After more than 10 years of lobbying both on the federal and state levels, in 1971, California passed legislation (the Behr bill) requiring the elk may not be hunted until their numbers surpass 2,000 head statewide or until it could be determined that suitable elk habitat no longer existed in the state, and mandated the California Department of Resources to reintroduce the elk into former habitats wherever possible.

By 1986 numbers had increased to over 2,000 individuals distributed among 22 populations throughout California, largely due to successful reintroduction programs. By 1998, California's tule elk population exceeded 3,200. In 2007, the statewide population was estimated at 3,800. A 2014 report placed the statewide population at 4,200 in 22 herds. As of 2019, the total Californian population was estimated to be 5,700.

Kucera and McCullough reported a drop in genetic diversity when it came to a trend of low population numbers experienced during near extinction. If a lack of genetic variation continues in areas with low population herd density, then the herd population could suffer from problems such as inbreeding depression or genetic drift to extinction.

Elk conservation in California is seen as a major success although the fragmentation of the reestablished populations continues to raise concerns regarding their genetic health at local levels. Monitoring both demographic and genetic parameters is essential in developing self-sustaining populations of tule elk in reintroduction programs.
