= Los Banos Municipal Airport =

- IATA: LSN; ICAO: KLSN; FAA LID: LSN

Summary
- Airport type: Public
- Owner: City of Los Banos
- Location: Los Banos, California
- Elevation AMSL: 121 ft (37 m)
- Coordinates: 37°03′46″N 120°52′09″W

Map
- Location of airport in California

Runways
Direction	Length		Surface
Direction	ft	m	Surface
14/32	3,801	1,159	Asphalt

Statistics (2011)
- Aircraft operations: 16,000
- Based aircraft: 14
- Source: Federal Aviation Administration

Los Banos Municipal Airport (IATA: LSN, ICAO: KLSN, FAA LID: LSN) is a city-owned public-use airport located one mile (1.6 km) west of the central business district of Los Banos, a city in Merced County, California, United States.

== Facilities and aircraft ==
Los Banos Municipal Airport covers an area of 101 acres (41 ha) which contains one asphalt paved runway (14/32) measuring 3,801 x 75 ft (1,159 x 23 m).

For the 12-month period ending June 15, 2011, the airport had 16,000 general aviation aircraft operations, an average of 44 per day. At that time there were 14 aircraft based at this airport: 79% single engine, and 7% helicopter, multi-engine, and jet aircraft respectively.

== Hazardous materials issues ==
Historically a release of hazardous materials to the environment has occurred at the airport. Groundwater in the site vicinity is perched in a high water table, with depth to groundwater being only seven to ten feet below the surface. Therefore, any release of contaminants to the soil poses a risk to aquifer contamination. The chief hazardous substances of concern at the airport are derived from prior pesticides and herbicides used by crop dusting aircraft; these operations ceased in 1989. At the present time, no such flights are authorized from the airport; in fact, the only hazardous materials presently used and stored at the airport are those associated with the underground gasoline fuel storage tanks. Surface runoff and groundwater flow is generally to the northeast toward the San Joaquin River.

Rinse water from maintenance operations flows into a storm drainage system and pesticide chemicals, which have previously contaminated soil and groundwater on the site, may have been introduced to the environment via this route. Contaminants include S,S,S-tributyl phosphorotrithioate (DEF), dicapthon, and bromophosethyl. These contaminants have been found in wells owned by the Los Banos Community Water District within three miles (5 km) of the airport.
