= Los Banos, California =

City in California, United States

Los Banos, California Los Baños
- City
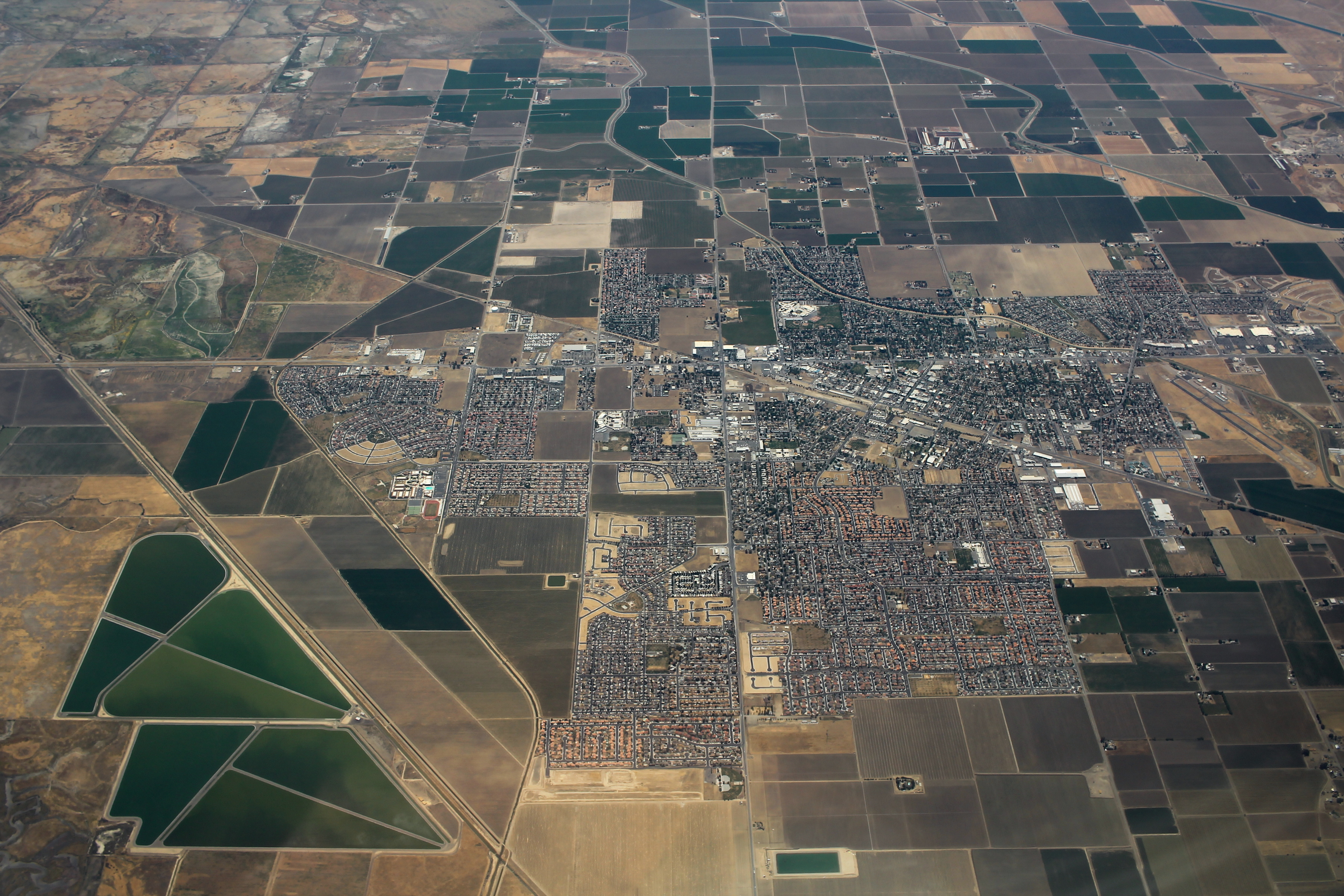
- Aerial view of Los Banos
- Interactive map of Los Banos, California
- Location within California Location within the United States
- Coordinates: 37°03′30″N 120°51′00″W
- Country: United States
- State: California
- County: Merced
- Incorporated: May 8, 1907

Government
  - Mayor: Michael Amabile

Area
  - Total: 10.12 sq mi (26.2 km^{2})
  - Land: 10.00 sq mi (25.9 km^{2})
  - Water: 0.12 sq mi (0.31 km^{2}) 1.22%
- Elevation: 115 ft (35 m)

Population (2020)
  - Total: 45,532
  - Density: 4,553/sq mi (1,758/km^{2})
- Time zone: UTC−8 (Pacific)
  - Summer (DST): UTC−7 (PDT)
- ZIP Code: 93635
- Area code: 209
- FIPS code: 06-44028
- GNIS feature IDs: 277547, 2410878
- Website: City of Los Banos

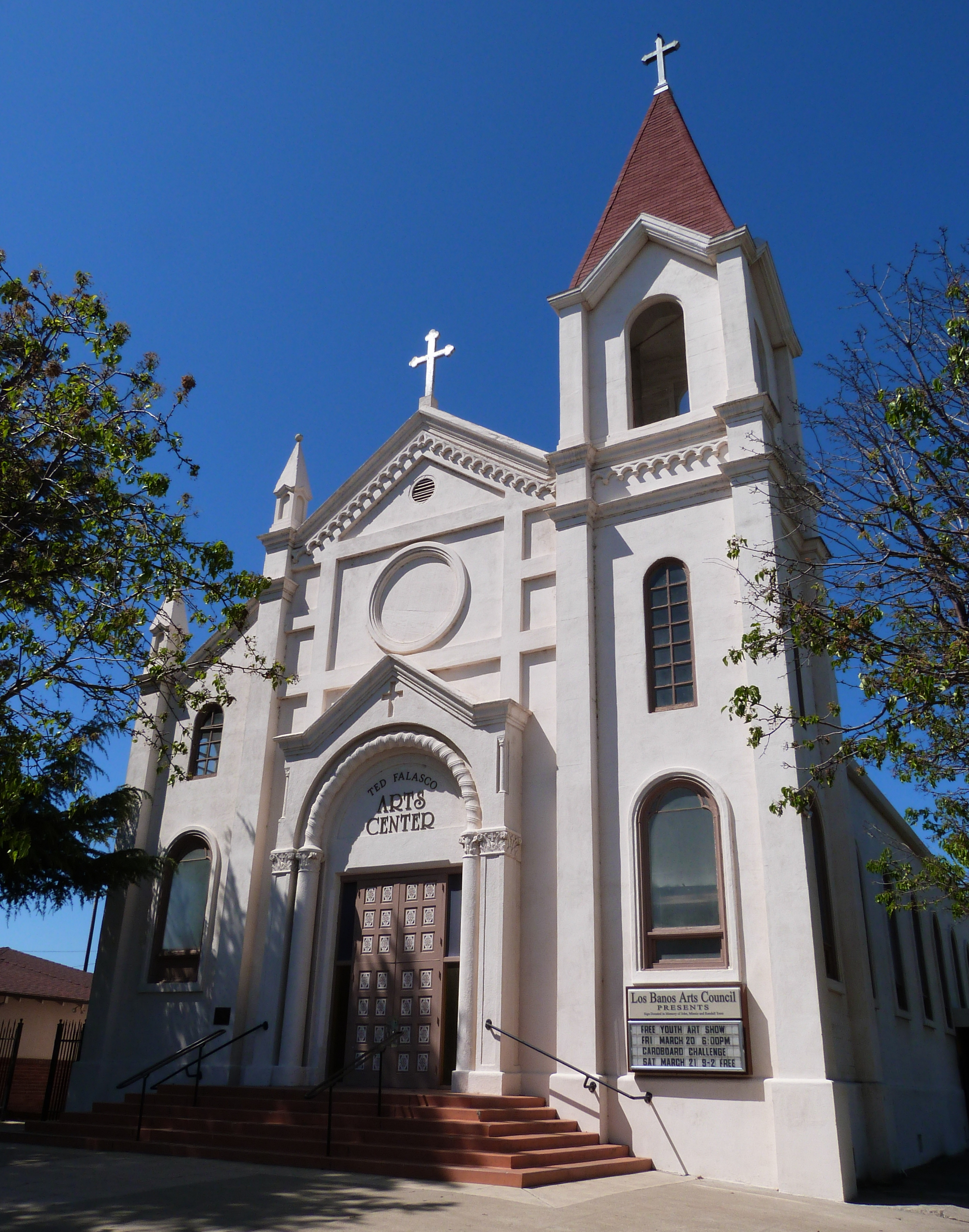
The Falasco Arts Center, housed in the historic St. Joseph's Church, Los Banos

Los Banos (/loʊs ˈbænoʊs/ lohss BAN-ohss), alternatively Los Baños (/loʊs ˈbænjoʊs/ lohss BAN-yohss), is a city in Merced County, California, United States. It is located in the San Joaquin Valley in Central California, near the junction of State Route 152 and Interstate 5. Its population was 45,532 at the 2020 census, up from 35,972 at the 2010 census. The city is served by Los Banos Municipal Airport for air transport access.

== Etymology ==
The town's Spanish name Los Baños means "the baths"; it is named after a spring that feeds natural wetlands in the western San Joaquín Valley. Its official spelling, reflected in the name of its post office, omits the tilde of the ñ, though some signs in town show its name as Los Baños.

== Geography ==
Los Banos is located on the west side of the San Joaquin Valley, 26 miles (42 km) southwest of Merced. The city is at the intersection of California State Route 152 and California State Route 165. 7 miles (11 km) to the west is Interstate 5, which extends north–south between Canada and Mexico. The San Luis Reservoir and the Diablo Range are farther to the west.

According to the United States Census Bureau, the city has a total area of 10.1 square miles (26 km^{2}), of which 0.1 square miles (0.26 km^{2}) (1.22%) is covered by water.

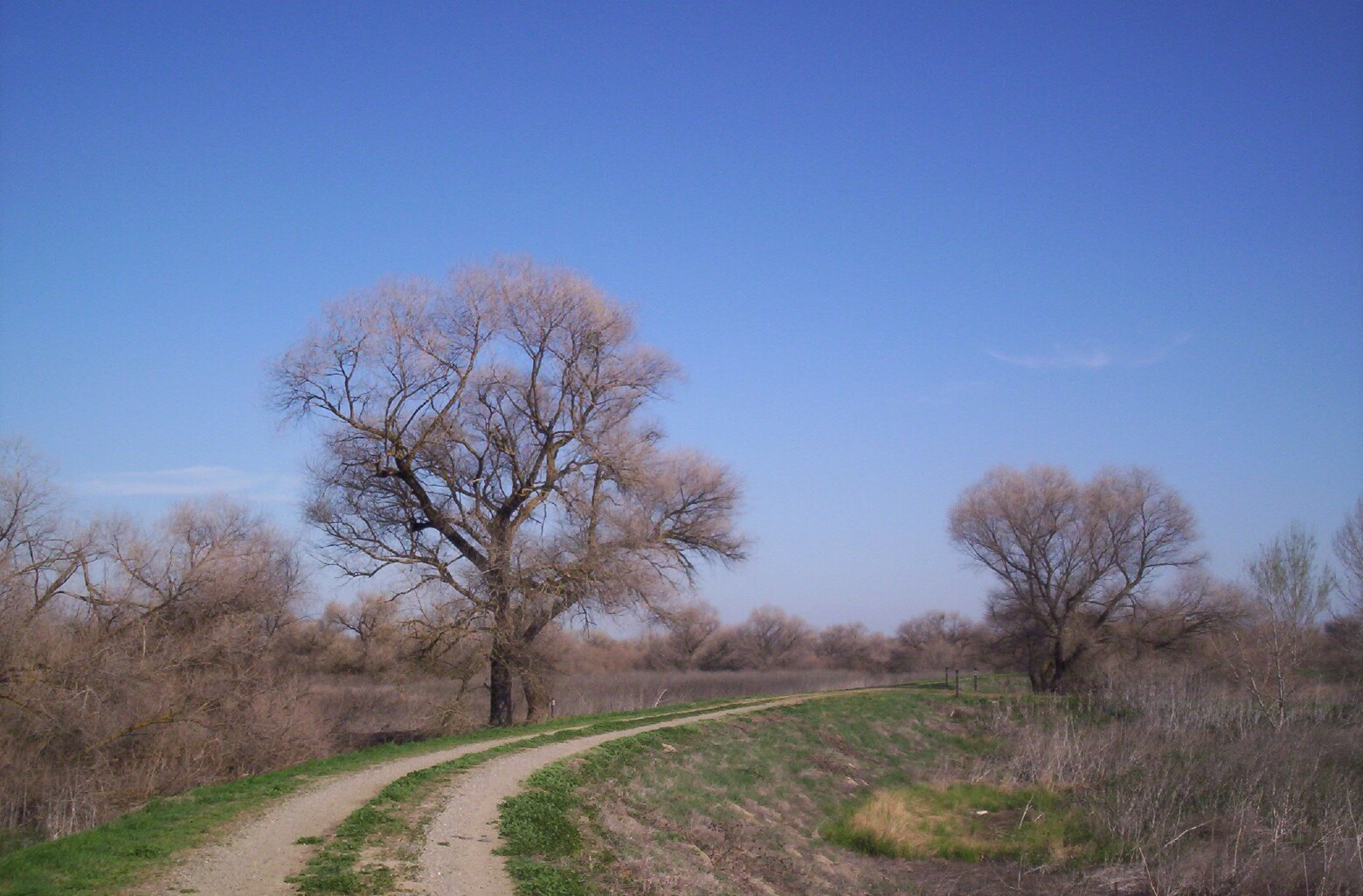
North levee, San Luis Refuge (March 2007)

Los Banos sits on the southwestern edge of extensive national and state game refuges; these wetlands support waterfowl and other wildlife habitat along a stretch of the San Joaquin River that still carries water and the Grassland Ecological Area, home to rare California grasslands habitat. The San Luis National Wildlife Refuge Complex includes San Luis National Wildlife Refuge, which includes the Kesterson Unit, East Bear Creek, West Bear Creek, and Blue Goose Unit. Nearby are the Merced National Wildlife Refuge and the San Joaquin River National Wildlife Refuge. Fishers, hunters, birdwatchers, and other recreational users come to Los Banos year round.

=== Climate ===
Los Banos has a semiarid climate (Köppen climate classification: BSk) with cool winters and hot summers. Most of the precipitation falls in the winter. Gusty winds are common in the late afternoon, especially in the vicinity of nearby Pacheco Pass.

On average, 97.1 days have highs of 90 °F (32.2 °C) or higher, and 15.5 days have lows of 32 °F (0 °C) or lower. The record high temperature of 116 °F (46.7 °C) was on July 25, 1931. A record low temperature of 14 °F (−10 °C) was on January 11, 1949, and again on December 22, 1990.

The average annual rainfall is 9.48 inches (240.8 mm), with an average of 47 days with measurable precipitation. The wettest year recorded was 1998 with 21.08 inches (535.4 mm) and the driest year was 2020 with 3.74 inches (95 mm). The most rainfall in one month was 8.08 inches (205.2 mm) in March 1998. The most rainfall in 24 hours was 2.4 inches (61 mm) on January 18, 1914. Although snow is rare, 3 inches (7.6 cm) fell in January 1916 and 1.5 inches (3.8 cm) fell in January 1962.

Climate data for Los Banos, California (1991–2020 normals, extremes 1929–present)
| Month | Jan | Feb | Mar | Apr | May | Jun | Jul | Aug | Sep | Oct | Nov | Dec | Year |
|---|---|---|---|---|---|---|---|---|---|---|---|---|---|
| Record high °F (°C) | 75 (24) | 80 (27) | 89 (32) | 98 (37) | 106 (41) | 114 (46) | 116 (47) | 114 (46) | 113 (45) | 104 (40) | 87 (31) | 75 (24) | 116 (47) |
| Mean maximum °F (°C) | 66.6 (19.2) | 72.4 (22.4) | 80.6 (27.0) | 89.5 (31.9) | 97.5 (36.4) | 103.6 (39.8) | 105.5 (40.8) | 104.6 (40.3) | 101.9 (38.8) | 93.1 (33.9) | 78.9 (26.1) | 66.4 (19.1) | 107.0 (41.7) |
| Mean daily maximum °F (°C) | 55.6 (13.1) | 61.7 (16.5) | 67.7 (19.8) | 73.3 (22.9) | 81.2 (27.3) | 88.9 (31.6) | 94.6 (34.8) | 93.9 (34.4) | 89.6 (32.0) | 79.2 (26.2) | 65.5 (18.6) | 55.8 (13.2) | 75.6 (24.2) |
| Daily mean °F (°C) | 47.0 (8.3) | 52.4 (11.3) | 57.1 (13.9) | 61.5 (16.4) | 68.6 (20.3) | 74.5 (23.6) | 79.3 (26.3) | 78.1 (25.6) | 74.4 (23.6) | 66.0 (18.9) | 54.8 (12.7) | 46.7 (8.2) | 63.4 (17.4) |
| Mean daily minimum °F (°C) | 39.3 (4.1) | 42.5 (5.8) | 46.1 (7.8) | 49.4 (9.7) | 55.2 (12.9) | 60.4 (15.8) | 63.8 (17.7) | 62.8 (17.1) | 60.1 (15.6) | 52.7 (11.5) | 44.3 (6.8) | 38.4 (3.6) | 51.3 (10.7) |
| Mean minimum °F (°C) | 29.1 (−1.6) | 32.6 (0.3) | 36.8 (2.7) | 38.9 (3.8) | 45.6 (7.6) | 50.4 (10.2) | 54.0 (12.2) | 54.0 (12.2) | 50.5 (10.3) | 42.6 (5.9) | 34.0 (1.1) | 28.1 (−2.2) | 26.7 (−2.9) |
| Record low °F (°C) | 14 (−10) | 20 (−7) | 24 (−4) | 30 (−1) | 35 (2) | 39 (4) | 45 (7) | 46 (8) | 38 (3) | 28 (−2) | 24 (−4) | 14 (−10) | 14 (−10) |
| Average precipitation inches (mm) | 2.07 (53) | 1.83 (46) | 1.34 (34) | 0.65 (17) | 0.46 (12) | 0.08 (2.0) | 0.02 (0.51) | 0.01 (0.25) | 0.05 (1.3) | 0.46 (12) | 0.85 (22) | 1.66 (42) | 9.48 (242.06) |
| Average precipitation days | 8.9 | 8.3 | 7.4 | 4.4 | 2.3 | 0.7 | 0.1 | 0.2 | 0.4 | 2.0 | 4.6 | 7.7 | 47.0 |
Source 1: NOAA
Source 2: National Weather Service

== Demographics ==
Historical population
| Census | Pop. | Note | %± |
|---|---|---|---|
| 1910 | 745 | | — |
| 1920 | 1,276 | | 71.3% |
| 1930 | 1,875 | | 46.9% |
| 1940 | 2,214 | | 18.1% |
| 1950 | 3,868 | | 74.7% |
| 1960 | 5,272 | | 36.3% |
| 1970 | 9,188 | | 74.3% |
| 1980 | 10,341 | | 12.5% |
| 1990 | 14,519 | | 40.4% |
| 2000 | 25,869 | | 78.2% |
| 2010 | 35,972 | | 39.1% |
| 2020 | 45,532 | | 26.6% |
U.S. Decennial Census; 1850–1870 1880-1890; 1900 1910 1920; 1930 1940 1950; 1960 1970 1980; 1990 2000 2010

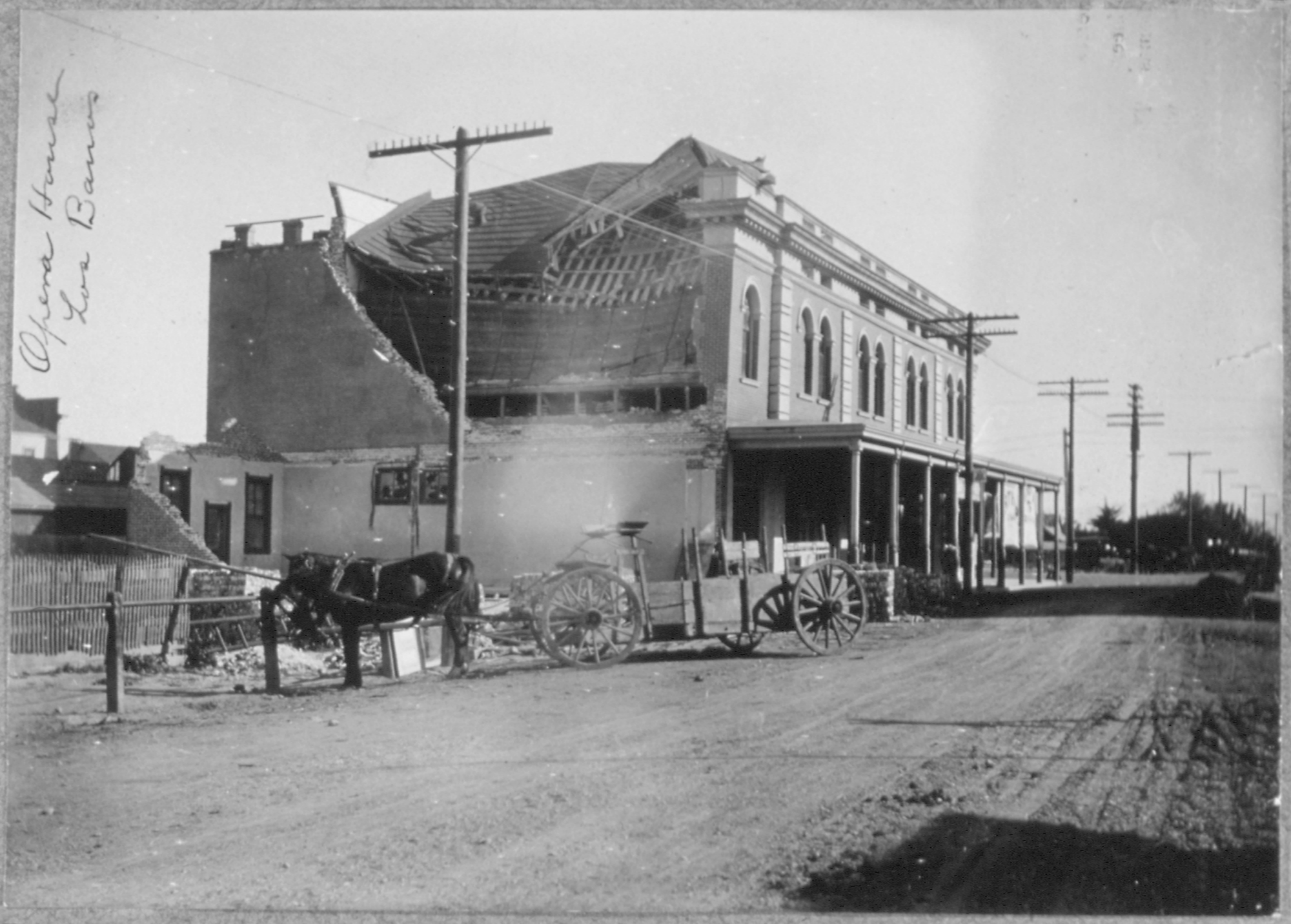
The Opera House in Los Banos following the 1906 San Francisco earthquake

=== 2020 census ===
As of the 2020 census, Los Banos had a population of 45,532. The population density was 4,556.4 inhabitants per square mile (1,759.2/km^{2}). The median age was 31.6 years. For every 100 females there were 98.1 males, and for every 100 females age 18 and over there were 96.6 males age 18 and over.

The census reported that 99.7% of the population lived in households, 0.1% lived in non-institutionalized group quarters, and 0.1% were institutionalized. 99.9% of residents lived in urban areas, while 0.1% lived in rural areas.

There were 12,626 households in Los Banos, of which 50.7% had children under the age of 18 living in them. Of all households, 54.9% were married-couple households, 8.0% were cohabiting couple households, 14.9% were households with a male householder and no spouse or partner present, and 22.2% were households with a female householder and no spouse or partner present. About 14.2% of all households were made up of individuals and 7.5% had someone living alone who was 65 years of age or older. The average household size was 3.6. There were 10,326 families (81.8% of all households).

The age distribution was 30.9% under the age of 18, 10.6% aged 18 to 24, 25.8% aged 25 to 44, 21.9% aged 45 to 64, and 10.8% who were 65 years of age or older.

There were 13,182 housing units at an average density of 1,319.1 units per square mile (509.3 units/km^{2}), of which 12,626 (95.8%) were occupied. Of occupied units, 60.6% were owner-occupied and 39.4% were occupied by renters. Of all housing units, 4.2% were vacant. The homeowner vacancy rate was 1.2% and the rental vacancy rate was 3.1%.

Racial composition as of the 2020 census
| Race | Number | Percent |
|---|---|---|
| White | 14,199 | 31.2% |
| Black or African American | 1,134 | 2.5% |
| American Indian and Alaska Native | 1,275 | 2.8% |
| Asian | 1,510 | 3.3% |
| Native Hawaiian and Other Pacific Islander | 334 | 0.7% |
| Some other race | 18,258 | 40.1% |
| Two or more races | 8,822 | 19.4% |
| Hispanic or Latino (of any race) | 33,611 | 73.8% |

=== 2023 ACS estimates ===
In 2023, the US Census Bureau estimated that 27.6% of the population were foreign-born. Of all people aged 5 or older, 47.8% spoke only English at home, 48.7% spoke Spanish, 2.4% spoke other Indo-European languages, 1.0% spoke Asian or Pacific Islander languages, and 0.0% spoke other languages. Of those aged 25 or older, 71.1% were high school graduates and 13.2% had a bachelor's degree.

The median household income in 2023 was $70,893, and the per capita income was $25,505. About 15.9% of families and 16.2% of the population were below the poverty line.

=== 2010 census ===
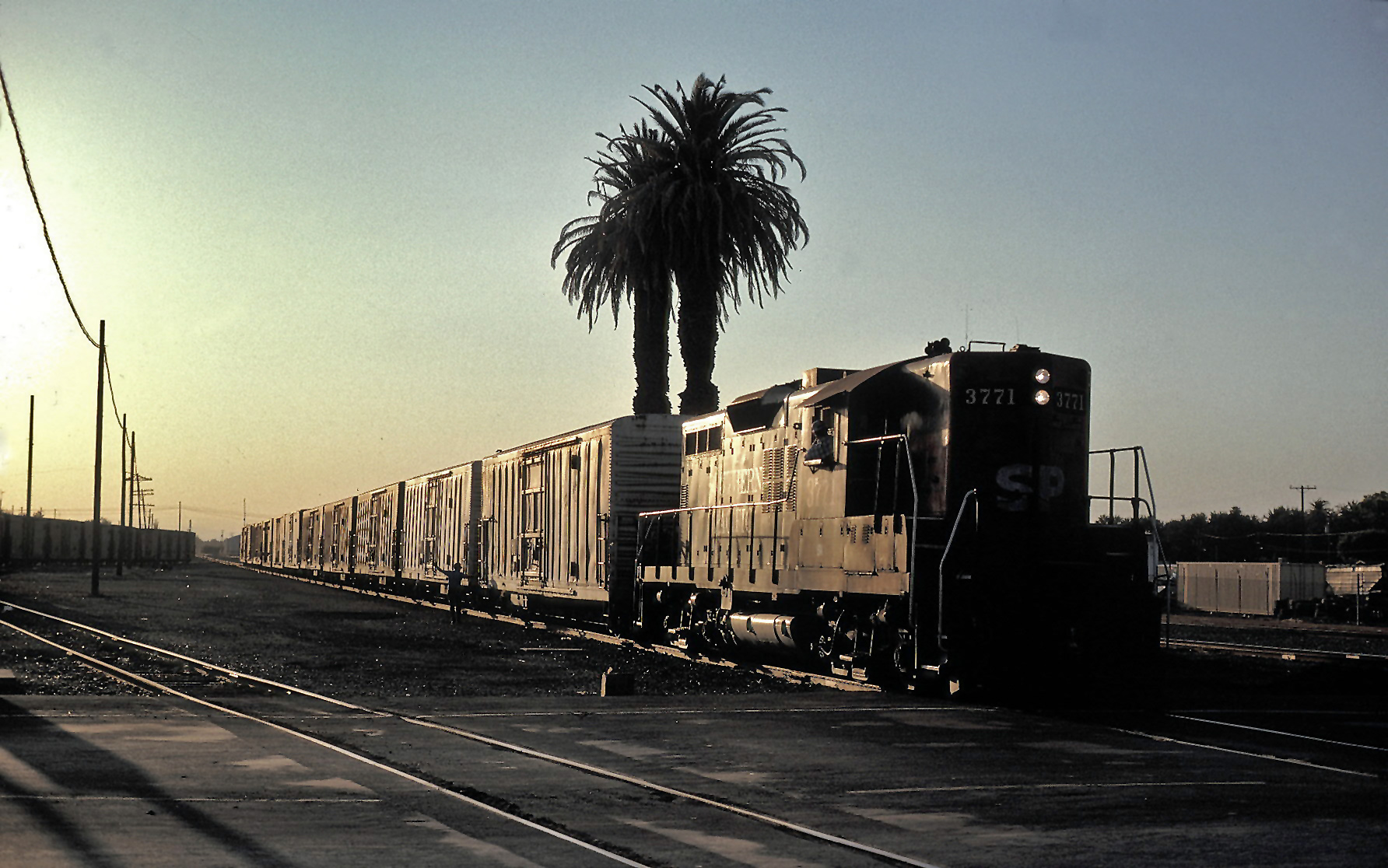
Switching in Los Banos, 1991

At the 2010 census, Los Banos had a population of 35,972. The population density was 3,555.6 inhabitants per square mile (1,372.8/km^{2}). The racial makeup of Los Banos was 20,846 (58.0%) White, 1,354 (3.8%) African American, 512 (1.4%) Native American, 1,162 (3.2%) Asian, 134 (0.4%) Pacific Islander, 10,123 (28.1%) from other races, and 1,841 (5.1%) from two or more races. Hispanics or Latinos of any race were 23,346 persons (64.9%).

The census reported that 35,791 people (99.5% of the population) lived in households, 103 (0.3%) lived in noninstitutionalized group quarters, and 78 (0.2%) were institutionalized.

Of the 10,259 households, 5,451 (53.1%) had children under 18 living in them, 6,018 (58.7%) were opposite-sex married couples living together, 1,474 (14.4%) had a female householder with no husband present, 838 (8.2%) had a male householder with no wife present, 791 were (7.7%) unmarried opposite-sex partnerships, 78 (0.8%) were same-sex married couples or partnerships, and 1,551 households (15.1%) were one person and 653 (6.4%) had someone living alone who was 65 or older. The average household size was 3.49. There were 8,330 families (81.2% of households); the average family size was 3.84.

The age distribution was 12,102 people (33.6%) under 18, 3,703 people (10.3%) from 18 to 24, 9,596 people (26.7%) from 25 to 44, 7,494 people (20.8%) from 45 to 64, and 3,077 people (8.6%) who were 65 or older. The median age was 29.8 years. For every 100 females, there were 99.2 males. For every 100 females 18 and over, there were 96.0 males.

The 11,375 housing units had an average density of 1,124.4 per square mile, of the occupied units 6,197 (60.4%) were owner-occupied and 4,062 (39.6%) were rented. The homeowner vacancy rate was 4.1%; the rental vacancy rate was 8.4%. 20,687 people (57.5% of the population) lived in owner-occupied housing units and 15,104 people (42.0%) lived in rental housing units.

== Government ==
In the California State Legislature, Los Banos is in the 14th senatorial district, represented by Democrat Anna Caballero, and in the 27th Assembly district, represented by Democrat Esmeralda Soria.

In the United States House of Representatives, Los Banos is in California's 13th congressional district, which has a Cook PVI of D +4 and is represented by Democrat Adam Gray.

As of 2025, Michael Amabile is the mayor.

== History and culture ==
The Los Banos area was initially settled, according to Mexican land-grant records, in the 1840s. The first Anglo-American settler in the area was Uriah Wood, who built his two-room cabin in 1859. The original site of Los Banos was located several miles from the current town center, about a mile and half west of the railroad near present-day Volta. The town was essentially a trading post and received its name when the post office was established and the Post Office Department designated the office "Los Banos" after the nearby creek. When the railroad arrived, Los Banos relocated to its present-day site. The first post office opened in 1873.

Land and water rights were important to early Los Banos residents, but those rights were recognized only when the land and deed were registered. Sometimes, those rights depended on fleet footedness, as it did in the "race" between Los Banos residents Uriah Wood and Henry Miller. Wood, whose homestead was located off of Badger Flat Road, raced Miller to the land office in Stockton to insure his claim to the land would be recognized. After crossing the San Joaquin River, Wood paid the ferryman $5 to hold the boat on the east side of the river to insure he would gain sufficient distance from Miller to ensure he would reach the land office first. Wood succeeded and the seven sections that he registered cost him only 45¢ an acre.

The centerpiece of downtown Los Banos is Henry Miller Plaza, honoring early California rancher Henry Miller. The 10-acre (4.0 ha) half-oval public plaza features a monumental scale bronze arrangement of Miller with cattle. At one time in the late 19th century, Miller was the largest land owner in the United States. The success of his business monopolized the California agricultural industry, funneling resources and supplies to create his prosperous company. Centered around cattle farming, the Miller and Lux Corporation ultimately transformed the San Joaquin Valley into what can be considered as a precursor to corporate farming and turning independent farmers into wageworkers. His company, the Miller & Lux Corporation, was headquartered in Los Banos on a site currently housing the Mexican restaurant España's and the Canal Farm Inn.

Los Banos has a long history of Portuguese, Italian, and Spanish immigrants, as do many of the nearby towns on the west side of the San Joaquin Valley. This is reflected both in local restaurants and in several festivals and parades that take place during the year. There is also a significant community of Basques. Los Banos is locally known for its annual May Day Fair during the first week of May.

Los Banos is home to The Randall Fawcett House, a Frank Lloyd Wright designed Usonian home.

A member of the Manson family, Susan Atkins attended Los Banos High School, before joining the family.

Since the 1980s, the city's population has changed with a continuing influx of people who work in the San Jose/Silicon Valley area but seek more affordable housing and slower pace of semi-rural life, a pattern seen in many other small towns within commuting distance of Silicon Valley.

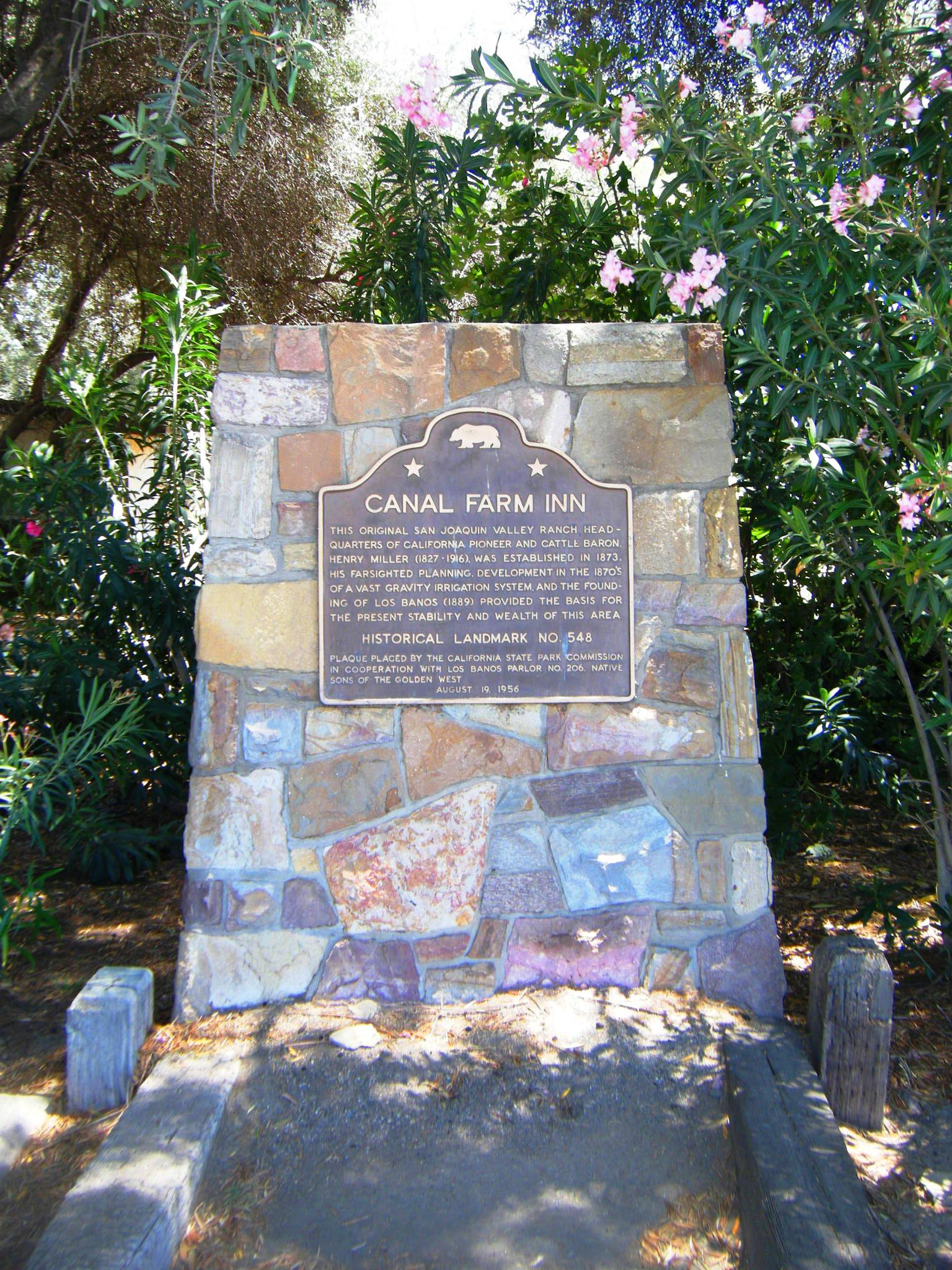
Canal Farm Inn, a California Historical Landmark

- California Historical Landmark Canal Farm Inn is located at 1460 E Pacheco Blvd, Los Banos. Canal Farm Inn is a California Historical Landmarks, number 548.

The California Historical Landmark reads:

NO. 548 CANAL FARM INN – This original San Joaquin Valley ranch headquarters of California pioneer and cattle baron Henry Miller (1827–1916) was established in 1873. His farsighted planning and development in the 1870s of a vast gravity irrigation system, and the founding of Los Banos in 1889, provided the basis for this area's present stability and wealth.

== Notable people ==
- Mack Wheat, (1893–1979), was a Major League Baseball catcher from 1915 to 1921 for Brooklyn and the Philadelphia Phillies.
- Logan Whitehurst (1977-2006), musician and founding member of The Velvet Teen

== Education ==
K–12 education is provided by the Los Banos Unified School District. In addition, the Los Banos Campus of Merced College has served community college students since 2007.

== Economy ==
=== Top employers ===
According to the city's 2018 Comprehensive Annual Financial Report, the top employers in the city are:

| # | Employer | # of Employees |
|---|---|---|
| 1 | Los Banos Unified School District | 1,082 |
| 2 | Walmart | 340 |
| 3 | Memorial Hospital Los Banos | 286 |
| 4 | Kagome | 206 |
| 5 | City of Los Banos | 178 |
| 6 | Target | 153 |
| 7 | APEX | 126 |
| 8 | The Home Depot | 125 |
| 9 | Save Mart | 90 |
| 10 | Central California Irrigation District | 75 |
