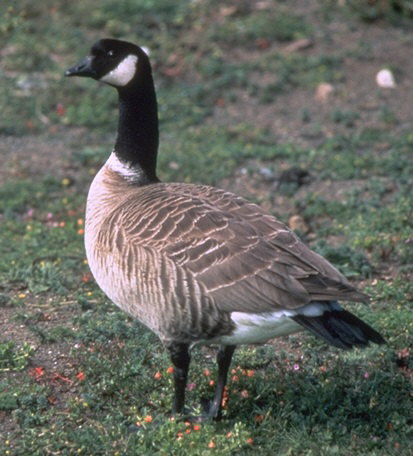
- Branta hutchinsii leucopareia

Conservation status
- Vulnerable (NatureServe)
- CITES Appendix II

Scientific classification
- Kingdom: Animalia
- Phylum: Chordata
- Class: Aves
- Order: Anseriformes
- Family: Anatidae
- Genus: Branta
- Species: B. hutchinsii
- Subspecies: B. h. leucopareia

Trinomial name
- Branta hutchinsii leucopareia (J.F. Brandt, 1836)

Synonyms
- Branta canadensis leucopareia (J.F. Brandt, 1836); Branta hutchinsii asiatica Aldrich, 1946; Branta canadensis asiatica Aldrich, 1946; Anser leucopareius J.F. Brandt, 1836

= Aleutian cackling goose =

Subspecies of bird

The Aleutian cackling goose (Branta hutchinsii leucopareia) is a small subspecies of the cackling goose averaging 1.7 to 2.1 kg (3.7 to 4.6 lb) in weight. It was one of 122 species of animals, birds, and fishes first documented for science by the Lewis and Clark Expedition (Corps of Discovery).

== Taxonomy ==
The Aleutian cackling goose was formerly thought to be a subspecies of the Canada goose, as Branta canadensis leucopareia. The Bering cackling goose, a related population/subspecies, lived on the Komandorski and Kuril islands. This population was not markedly distinct from the Aleutian one, and it is debated as to whether its subspecies B. h. asiatica is valid. By about 1920 or so (last seen either in 1914 or 1929), the Bering population became extinct as a result of predation by humans and introduced Arctic foxes.

== Description ==
The Aleutian cackling goose has the typical black head and neck, white cheek patches, grayish-brown back and wings, white rump, black tail feathers, legs, and feet of the species. It is distinguished by a conspicuous white neck ring at the base of the neck that in adult plumage is usually greater than 10 mm (0.39 in) wide and is subtended by a ring of darker feathers. The cheek patches are usually separated by a black line under the throat and the breast is a pale grayish-brown color, although a small number of lighter- and darker-breasted birds occur. The westernmost population did not appreciably differ in color, except that the neck ring was always very wide and white in the few attested specimens.

Similar in appearance is the small cackling goose (B. h. minima), which is smaller and has a dark breast color with a purplish or brownish cast, whereas Taverner's cackling goose (B. h. taverneri) is larger and has a lighter breast color. Both B. h. minima and B. h. taverneri sometimes have white neck rings, but these are usually narrow or indistinct.

== Conservation ==
The primary threat to the Aleutian cackling goose has been the Arctic fox, introduced to the Aleutian Islands by Russian fur traders between 1836 and 1930. By 1963, the breeding range of the goose was restricted to Buldir Island, and the Aleutian cackling goose was listed by the U.S. Department of the Interior as endangered in 1967. Since then, the Aleutian cackling goose has made a comeback, and it was reclassified as threatened in 1990 before being removed from the United States Fish and Wildlife Service list of endangered mammals and birds in 2001.

== Breeding ==
Aleutian cackling geese typically arrive in California in mid-October each year. The majority of the population goes right to its primary wintering areas in the Central Valley. Since 2002, though, a relatively small (1500–5000) number of geese spend fall and winter on the northern coast. Around late December, the geese wintering in the Central Valley begin moving north, and by mid-February, most of the Aleutian cackling goose population is located in northwestern California until they depart for the Aleutian Islands in mid-April. As of 2004, Humboldt County began receiving the majority of Aleutian cackling geese on the northwestern coast from January through April.

== See also ==
- San Joaquin River National Wildlife Refuge
