= Los Banos Wildlife Area =

Protected area in California, United States

- IUCN category IV (habitat/species management area)
- Location within California
- Location: Merced County, California, United States
- Nearest city: Los Banos, California
- Coordinates: 37.13021°N 120.79760°W
- Area: 6,200 acres (25 km^{2})
- Designation: Wildlife Area
- Created: 1929
- Established: 1929
- Governing body: California Department of Fish and Wildlife
- Operator: California Department of Fish and Wildlife
- Owner: State of California
- Website: California Department of Fish & Wildlife - Los Banos Wildlife Area

Los Banos Wildlife Area is a protected wildlife reserve located in Merced County, California, covering approximately 6,200 acres (25 km^{2}). The area is managed by the California Department of Fish and Wildlife (CDFW) and serves as an important habitat for various species of waterfowl, mammals, and fish. It is a key part of the Pacific Flyway, providing seasonal refuge for migratory birds.

== History ==
Los Banos Wildlife Area was established in 1929 to conserve wetland and upland habitats crucial for migratory birds. The site has since expanded to include additional marshlands, riparian zones, and grasslands, supporting biodiversity and ecosystem stability.

Before 1840, the Los Banos Wildlife Area was home to the Yokuts, a Native American people who lived throughout the region. They practiced a hunting and gathering lifestyle, relying on the area's natural resources for sustenance. With the arrival of European settlers, the land was used for commercial, subsistence, and recreational hunting. Over time, the depletion of wildlife and new hunting regulations limited commercial and subsistence hunting.

Part of the wildlife area lies within the boundaries of San Jon de Santa Rita, a vast Mexican land grant awarded by the Governor of Mexico in 1841. In 1863, the Miller and Lux company acquired 8,000 acres of the grant, and by 1870, Henry Miller controlled the remaining land. Large portions of these holdings were rented or sold, with early settlers primarily cultivating small grains.

In 1929, the California Fish and Game Commission acquired 3,000 acres of land previously used for livestock grazing. This land had long been utilized for both subsistence and recreational hunting. Over time, additional parcels were purchased from former farmland, expanding the protected area. In 1954, the land was officially designated as a wildlife area by the Fish and Game Commission.

== Fauna and flora ==
The wildlife area features seasonal and permanent wetlands, riparian corridors, and upland habitats that support a diverse array of species. Key wildlife includes:

- Birds – Mallards, pintails, Canada geese, great blue herons, sandhill cranes, and various shorebirds.
- Mammals – Coyotes, raccoons, black-tailed deer, and river otters.
- Fish and Amphibians – Largemouth bass, bluegill, western pond turtles, and various amphibians native to the region.

== Recreational activities ==
Los Banos Wildlife Area is open to the public and offers a variety of recreational opportunities, including:

- Birdwatching – Popular among birders, especially during migration seasons.
- Hunting – Waterfowl and upland game bird hunting is permitted during regulated seasons.
- Fishing – Anglers can fish in designated waterways within the reserve.
- Wildlife Photography – Opportunities to observe and photograph native species.

== Conservation efforts ==
The California Department of Fish and Wildlife actively manages the area to maintain wetland quality and habitat diversity. Conservation efforts include:

- Water management to support seasonal wetlands.
- Habitat restoration projects to maintain biodiversity.
- Monitoring of migratory bird populations and wetland conditions.

== See also ==
- San Luis National Wildlife Refuge
- Merced National Wildlife Refuge
- California Department of Fish and Wildlife
