= Pacheco High School =

Highschool in Los Banos, California, USA

Coordinates: 37.06831°N 120.81601°W

Pacheco High School is a public high school located in Los Banos, Merced County, California, United States. It is part of the LBUSD, Los Banos Unified School District. Pacheco High School is the newest high school in the city of Los Banos, CA. The school opened its doors in August 2010. It first enrolled students of grades nine and ten, who later continued as eleventh and twelfth graders. The name "Pacheco" is notable throughout the city of Los Banos. One of the main streets is named "Pacheco Boulevard", better known as State HWY 152. The school is home to the Pacheco Panthers. Its colors are purple, black, and silver. It has several classroom buildings, two gyms, a large pool, a football stadium with a running track - known as Veterans Stadium, a soccer field, three baseball/softball fields, and eight tennis courts. The first class to graduate from Pacheco High School was the Class of 2013. There were an estimated 289 graduating students. The first commencement ceremony took place on June 7, 2013.

The name "Pacheco" derives from Don Francisco Pérez Pacheco, noted Californio ranchero and owner of the Rancho Ausaymas y San Felipe.

== See also ==
- Pacheco Pass
