= Grasslands Wildlife Management Area =

Perpetual conservation easements on private lands by the U.S. Fish and Wildlife Service

- IUCN category IV (habitat/species management area)
- Interactive map of Grasslands Wildlife Management Area
- Location: Merced County, California, United States
- Nearest city: Los Banos
- Coordinates: 37°9′40″N 120°36′15″W
- Area: 70,000 acres (280 km^{2})
- Established: 1979
- Governing body: U.S. Fish and Wildlife Service
- Website: Official website

Ramsar Wetland
- Official name: Grassland Ecological Area (GEA)
- Designated: February 2, 2005
- Reference no.: 1451

Grasslands Wildlife Management Area lies within the San Joaquin River basin in California and supports the largest remaining block of wetlands in the Central Valley, containing 70,000 acres (280 km^{2}) of private wetlands and associated, and surrounding 53,000 acres (210 km^{2}) of state and federal lands. Perpetual conservation easements on private lands have been purchased by the United States Fish and Wildlife Service.

Land management activities are the responsibility of the landowners, not the Service. These wetlands and associated grasslands, complemented by two national wildlife refuges and four state wildlife areas, comprise over 160,000 acres (650 km^{2}) and are collectively known as the Grasslands Ecological Area.

This area is extremely important to Pacific Flyway populations of 19 duck species and 6 goose species. The Grasslands Ecological Area has been officially recognized as an integral unit of the Western Hemispheric Shorebird Reserve Network.

Large concentrations of migratory waterfowl, wading birds, and shorebirds are common and easily observed during late winter and early spring.

== See also ==
- Category: Native grasses of California
- List of protected grasslands of North America
