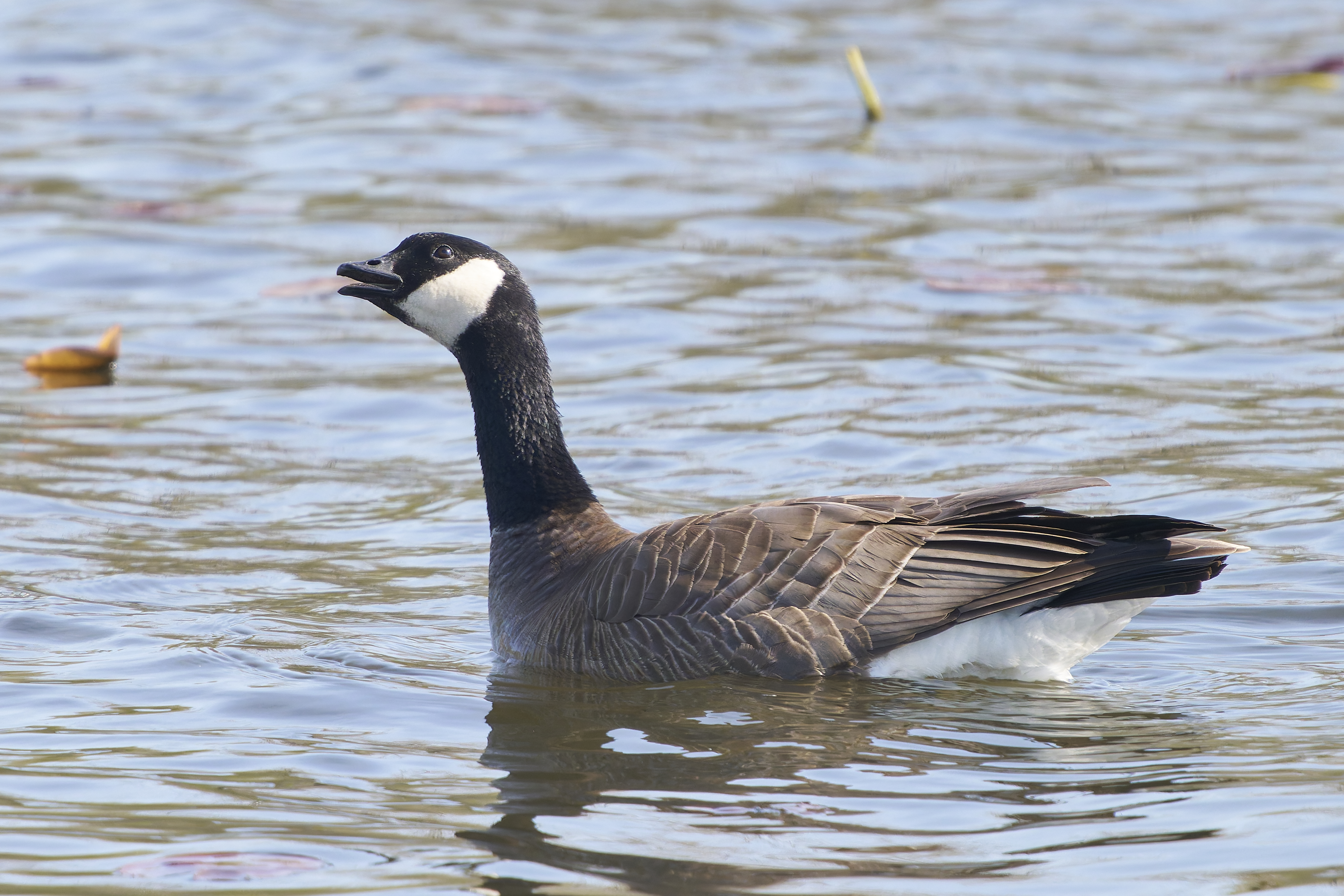
- Cackling goose

Conservation status
- Least Concern (IUCN 3.1)

Scientific classification
- Kingdom: Animalia
- Phylum: Chordata
- Class: Aves
- Order: Anseriformes
- Family: Anatidae
- Genus: Branta
- Species: B. hutchinsii

Binomial name
- Branta hutchinsii (Richardson, 1832)

Subspecies
- B. h. hutchinsii Richardson's cackling goose (Richardson, 1832); B. h. asiatica Bering cackling goose (Aldrich, 1946) (disputed; extinct); B. h. leucopareia Aleutian cackling goose (Brandt, 1836); B. h. taverneri Taverner's cackling goose (Delacour, 1951); B. h. minima Small cackling goose (Ridgway, 1885)

Synonyms
- Branta canadensis hutchinsii

= Cackling goose =

Species of bird

The cackling goose (Branta hutchinsii) is a species of goose found in North America and East Asia.

== Systematics ==
The genus name Branta is a Latinised form of Old Norse Brandgás, "burnt (black) goose", and the specific epithet hutchinsii commemorates English surgeon Thomas Hutchins who was employed by the Hudson's Bay Company.

The cackling goose was originally considered the same species or a subspecies of the Canada goose, but in July 2004 the American Ornithologists' Union's (AOU) Committee on Classification and Nomenclature split the two into two species, making cackling goose into a full species with the scientific name Branta hutchinsii. The British Ornithologists' Union (BOU) followed suit in June 2005.

The AOU has divided the many associated subspecies between both animals. To the present species were assigned:

- Richardson's cackling goose (B. h. hutchinsii)
- Aleutian cackling goose (B. h. leucopareia)
- Small cackling goose (B. h. minima)
- Taverner's cackling goose (B. h. taverneri)
- †Bering cackling goose (B. h. asiatica)—doubtfully distinct from B. h. leucopareia; extinct (c.1929)

The distinctions between the two geese have led to a great deal of confusion and debate among ornithologists. This has been aggravated by the overlap between the small types of Canada goose and larger types of cackling goose. The old "lesser Canada geese" were believed to be a partly hybrid population, with the birds named taverneri considered a mixture of minima with subspecies occidentalis and parvipes, which today remain with the Canada goose proper. Actually however, taverneri is one of the larger subspecies of cackling geese. In addition, it has been determined that the barnacle goose (B. leucopsis) is a derivative of the cackling goose lineage, whereas the Nene (B. sandvicensis) is an insular representative of the Canada goose.

In the wake of the discussion generated by the official standalone species designation, introduced by the AOU and BOU in 2004 and 2005, Harold C. Hanson published a paper in 2007 suggesting that Canada and cackling geese should be split into six species and 200 subspecies. The radical nature of this proposal provoked surprise, with Richard Banks of the AOU urging caution before any of Hanson's proposals be accepted. No further redesignation has been introduced by either of these Ornithologists' Unions.

== Description ==
The black head and neck with white "chinstrap" distinguish this goose from all other geese except the larger Canada goose (Branta canadensis) and the similarly sized barnacle goose (B. leucopsis). There are up to five subspecies of cackling goose of varying sizes and plumage details. The female looks virtually identical but is slightly lighter and has a different voice.

=== Distinction from Canada and barnacle geese ===
Some cackling geese are hard to distinguish from the Canada goose; the two were long assumed to form one species, with the cackling goose and the smaller Canada goose subspecies being called the "lesser Canada goose". The 1.4 kg (3.1 lb) small cackling geese (B. h. minima) are clearly much smaller than any Canada goose, but the nominate subspecies Richardson's cackling goose (B. h. hutchinsii), at up to 3 kg (6.6 lb), grows to the same size as some Canada geese. The distinctness of the extinct population of the Komandorski and Kuril Islands B. h. asiatica is controversial.

The barnacle goose differs in having a black breast and grey, rather than brownish, body plumage, as well as the white cheek covering over the eye.

The main differences from Canada geese come from cackling geese being on average less massive, having higher-pitched calls, a shorter neck, a more triangular, stubby bill that is usually shorter than the length of the head, and in some populations, a conspicuous white collar around the base of the neck.

Measurements:

- Length: 24.8–25.6 in (63–65 cm)
- Weight: 49.3–84.0 oz (1,400–2,380 g)
- Wingspan: 42.5–43.7 in (108–111 cm)

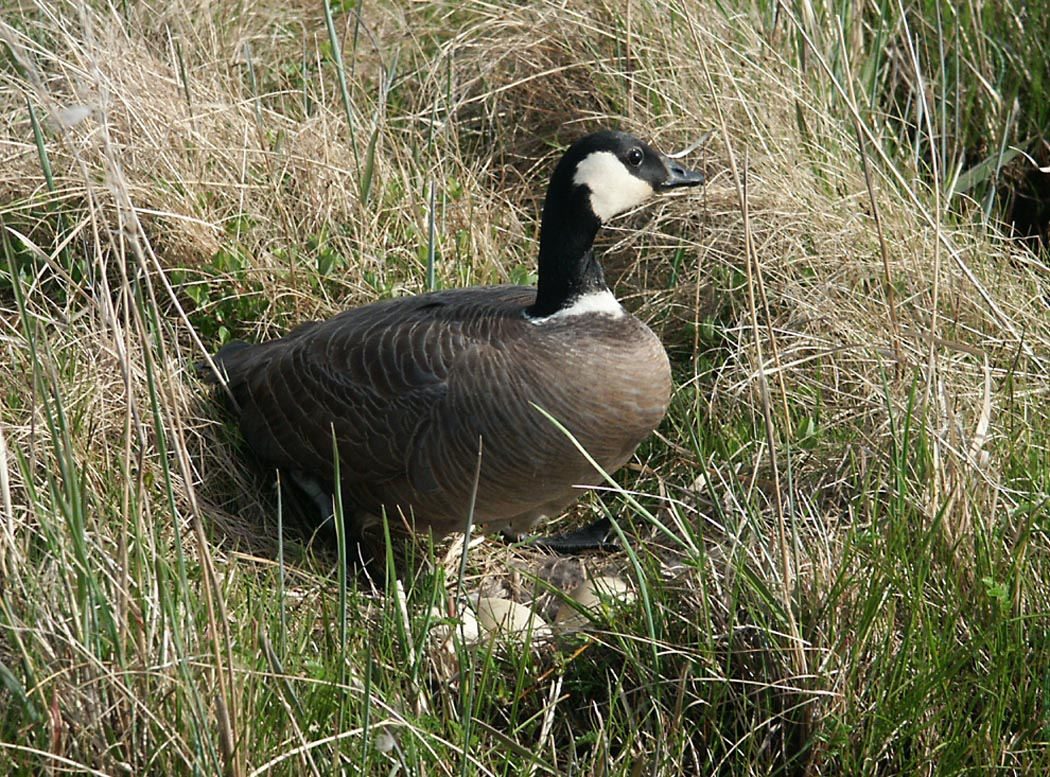
B. h. minima on eggs

== Range ==
This species is native to North America, breeding in Northern Canada and Alaska in a variety of tundra habitats, where the nest is usually located in an elevated area near water. The eggs are laid in a shallow depression, lined with plant materials and down. However, as the nests are made close-to, or directly on, the ground, the eggs (along with lone nesting females and newly-hatched goslings) are particularly vulnerable to predation by certain mammalian carnivores. Depending on the region, potential threats may vary from free-ranging domestic or feral cats and dogs, to foxes, coyotes, rats and other animals, such as some species of snakes. Thus, as a result, both geese—especially the male—in a nesting pair become highly aggressive and defensive of the nesting site, even chasing people away who may happen to walk by.

A pair may mate for life (up to around 20 years). Adult geese are often seen leading their goslings in a line with one parent at the front, and the other at the back of the "parade".

Like most geese, the cackling goose is naturally migratory, with their overwintering range being most of the U.S. (locally in Western Canada, the West Coast of the U.S. and northern Mexico). The calls overheard from large flocks of cackling geese, flying in their typical "V"-shaped formation, signal the transitions into spring and fall. In some areas, migration routes change due to shifts in available habitat, environment and food sources.

As vagrants, cackling geese have reached Western Europe of their own accord, as has been proven by ringing recoveries and documented sightings. The birds seen in Europe are of, at least, the subspecies hutchinsii, and possibly others. Cackling geese are also found, naturally, as vagrants around the Kamchatka Peninsula in Far Eastern Russia (Siberia), East China, and throughout the islands of Japan. Nevertheless, the IUCN considered the species to be extirpated from Japan, where it previously had an established non breeding (winter) population. Birds have recently been reintroduced to both Japan and Siberia.

== Feeding ==
These birds feed mainly on plant material. When feeding in water, they submerge their heads and necks to reach aquatic plants, sometimes tipping forward like a dabbling duck. Flocks of these birds often feed on leftover cultivated grains in fields, especially during migration or in winter. They also eat some insects, molluscs and crustaceans.

== Status ==
By the early 20th century, over-hunting and loss of habitat in the late 19th and early 20th centuries had resulted in a serious decline in the numbers of this bird in its native range. With improved game laws and habitat restoration and preservation programs, their populations have recovered in most of their range, although some local populations may still be declining, especially of the subspecies minima and leucopareia. Though the taxonomic distinctness of the Komandorski and Kuril Islands populations, which used to winter in Japan, is controversial, it is without doubt that they disappeared around 1929.

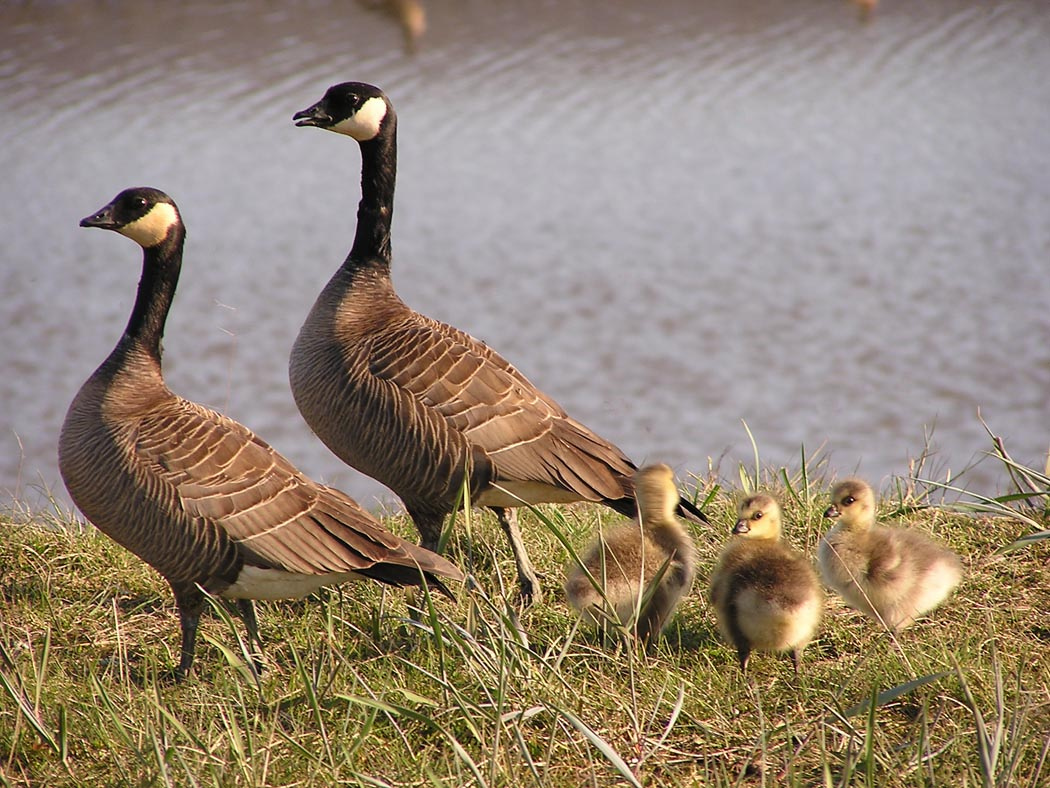
B. h. minima family
