= Los Banos High School =

Location
- 1966 11th St. Los Banos, California 93635; 37.0513345°N 120.8418590°W

Information
- School type: Public
- Established: 1963
- School district: Los Banos Unified School District
- Principal: Jason Waltman
- Staff: 72.16 (FTE)
- Enrollment: 1,543 (2023–2024)
- Student to teacher ratio: 21.38
- Colors: Gold and Maroon
- Team name: Tigers
- Rivals: Pacheco High School, Dos Palos High School
- Website: www.losbanosusd.org/o/lbhs/

Los Banos High School (pronounced "Loss-Ban-ohse") is a high school located in Los Banos, California, United States, in Merced County. Its sports programs play in the California Interscholastic Federation, Sac-Joaquin Section, Division IV, Central California Conference.

== Notable alumni ==
- Susan Atkins, member of the Manson Family
