= Volta Wildlife Area =

Protected area in California, United States

- IUCN category IV (habitat/species management area)
- Location within California
- Location: Merced County, California, United States
- Coordinates: 37.1238321°N 120.9190863°W
- Area: 3,800 acres (15 km^{2})
- Designation: Wildlife Area
- Designated: 1973
- Governing body: California Department of Fish and Wildlife
- Operator: California Department of Fish and Wildlife
- Owner: State of California
- Website: California Department of Fish & Wildlife - Volta Wildlife Area

Volta Wildlife Area is a protected wetland wildlife reserve located in Merced County, California, covering approximately 3,800 acres (15 km^{2}). The area is managed by the California Department of Fish and Wildlife (CDFW).

== History ==
From 1949 onward, multiple meetings were held across California focusing on the potential acquisition of wetland areas for state-managed waterfowl reserves. These discussions emphasized several objectives, including reducing economic losses to agriculture caused by waterfowl, preserving essential winter habitats for migratory birds, and providing opportunities for public waterfowl hunting. As a result of this process, the establishment of the Volta Wildlife Area was conceptually approved.

In 1952, the Department entered into a lease agreement to oversee management of the land, an agreement that has been renewed and revised multiple times since. The area has primarily been maintained as a seasonally inundated wetland to support migratory waterfowl and related species. In 1973, the site was formally designated as a wildlife area by the California Fish and Game Commission.

== Ecology and land management ==
The Volta Wildlife Area is part of a network of engineered wetlands in California's Central Valley that have been restored and managed to provide habitat for migratory waterfowl and other wildlife species. These managed wetlands rely on infrastructure such as irrigation canals, water pumps, and water control structures to maintain seasonal flooding, and they play a significant role in supporting large populations of migratory waterfowl and other wildlife. Volta has been noted for its early-migrating northern pintail populations and for providing habitat for the threatened giant garter snake.

The giant garter snake (Thamnophis gigas) is federally listed as threatened and occurs in managed wetland habitats such as those at Volta Wildlife Area.
