= Andrew Graham (naturalist) =

- Born: 1733; Edinburgh, Scotland
- Died: 8 September 1815 (aged 81–82); Prestonpans, Scotland
- Occupations: Naturalist, Chief Factor
- Employer: Hudson's Bay Company
- Spouse(s): Patricia Shere, Barbara Bowie

Andrew Graham (1733 – 8 September 1815) was a Scottish naturalist and a chief factor with the Hudson's Bay Company.

== Life ==
Andrew Graham was born in 1733, probably in the vicinity of Edinburgh.

He emigrated to Canada and worked for the Hudson's Bay Company from 1749 to 1775. His first assignment was to the company's most northerly trading station at Prince of Wales's Fort, now known as Churchill, Manitoba. There he served on three summer expeditions on board the sloop Churchill which traded with the Inuit who inhabited the northern parts of Hudson Bay. In 1753 he gained the position of assistant writer at York Factory in Manitoba, here he impressed the chief factor James Isham and was appointed to positions of higher responsibility.

In 1761 he became master at Fort Severn in Ontario where apart from the seasons 1765–66 and 1771–72 when he was acting chief at York, and 1769–70 when he was on leave he remained until 1774. In March 1774 he returned to Prince of Wales's Fort as chief factor and remained there until August 1775 when he retired and returned to Scotland.

As a naturalist, his principal contribution was a series of manuscript called “Observations” penned by Graham from 1767 onwards. These may have been a continuation of notes made by Isham in the 1740s. Among the subjects covered are stories of life at the company's posts on Hudson's Bay, trade lists, meteorological and astronomical observations, some transcripts of diaries written by explorers hired by the company explorers, and the first known vocabularies of local First Nations languages. Although, these short vocabularies were obtained second hand from other company men, as Graham never travelled into the interior. Altculture at this time. Most importantly, Graham's writings have lengthy sections on the natural history of the bay region, with the greatest details about birds.

From 1770, he collected many specimens, mainly birds, which he sent to London, many of them being described by Johann Reinhold Forster. Graham was assisted at times by fur trader and company surgeon Thomas Hutchins, who also worked on meteorological problems who may have plagiarised much of Graham's work.

Graham had a tangled personal life and was married at least twice, marrying Patricia Shere in Edinburgh in 1770; he also married Barbara Bowie at some point, and when he retired two mixed-blood children accompanied him back to Scotland. Where he died in Prestonpans on 8 September 1815. His will indicates he was a relatively wealthy man.
