= Los Banos Unified School District =

School district in California, United States

Address
- 1717 South 11th Street Los Banos, California, 93635; United States

District information
- Grades: K–12
- Superintendent: Mark E. Marshall
- Schools: 16
- NCES District ID: 0622740

Students and staff
- Students: 10,858 (2020–2021)
- Teachers: 449.37 (FTE)
- Staff: 551.12 (FTE)
- Student–teacher ratio: 24.16:1

Other information
- Website: www.losbanosusd.k12.ca.us

Los Banos Unified School District is a public school district based in Merced County, California, United States.

The District has fifteen schools, including Los Banos High School and Pacheco High School.
