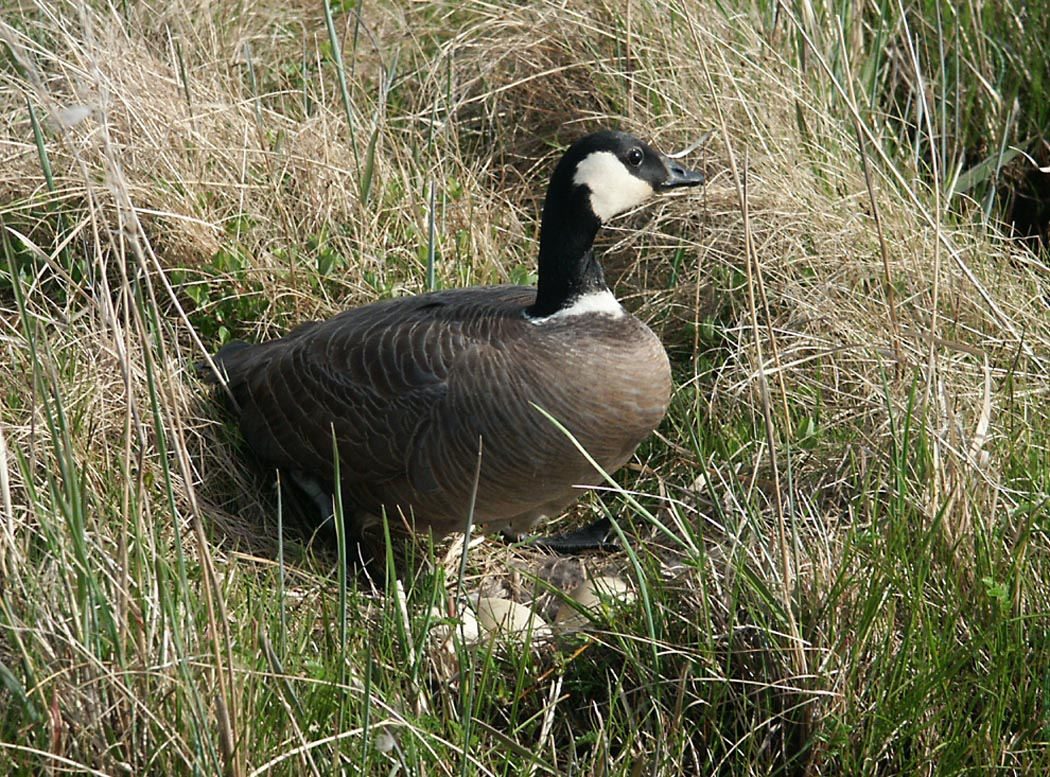
- A Ridgway’s goose with eggs

Conservation status
- Apparently Secure (NatureServe)

Scientific classification
- Domain: Eukaryota
- Kingdom: Animalia
- Phylum: Chordata
- Class: Aves
- Order: Anseriformes
- Family: Anatidae
- Genus: Branta
- Species: B. hutchinsii
- Subspecies: B. h. minima

Trinomial name
- Branta hutchinsii minima (Ridgway, 1885)

Synonyms
- Branta canadensis minima; Branta minima

= Small cackling goose =

Subspecies of bird

The small cackling goose (Branta hutchinsii minima), also known as the Ridgway's goose, is the smallest subspecies of cackling goose and the smallest variant of white-cheeked goose.

== Description ==
Ridgway’s geese are the smallest of the white cheeked geese and the second smallest goose in the genus Branta, following the red-breasted goose. It is only slightly larger than a mallard and has a culmen (bill) length of 32 mm.

The small cackling goose’s calls are described as high pitched yelps. In flight, it can be identified by its fast wingbeat, in contrast to Canada geese and the larger subspecies of cackling geese.

== Distribution ==
Small cackling geese are known to summer in western Alaska, and winter in the Willamette Valley. It has also been known to occur in California and southern Washington.
