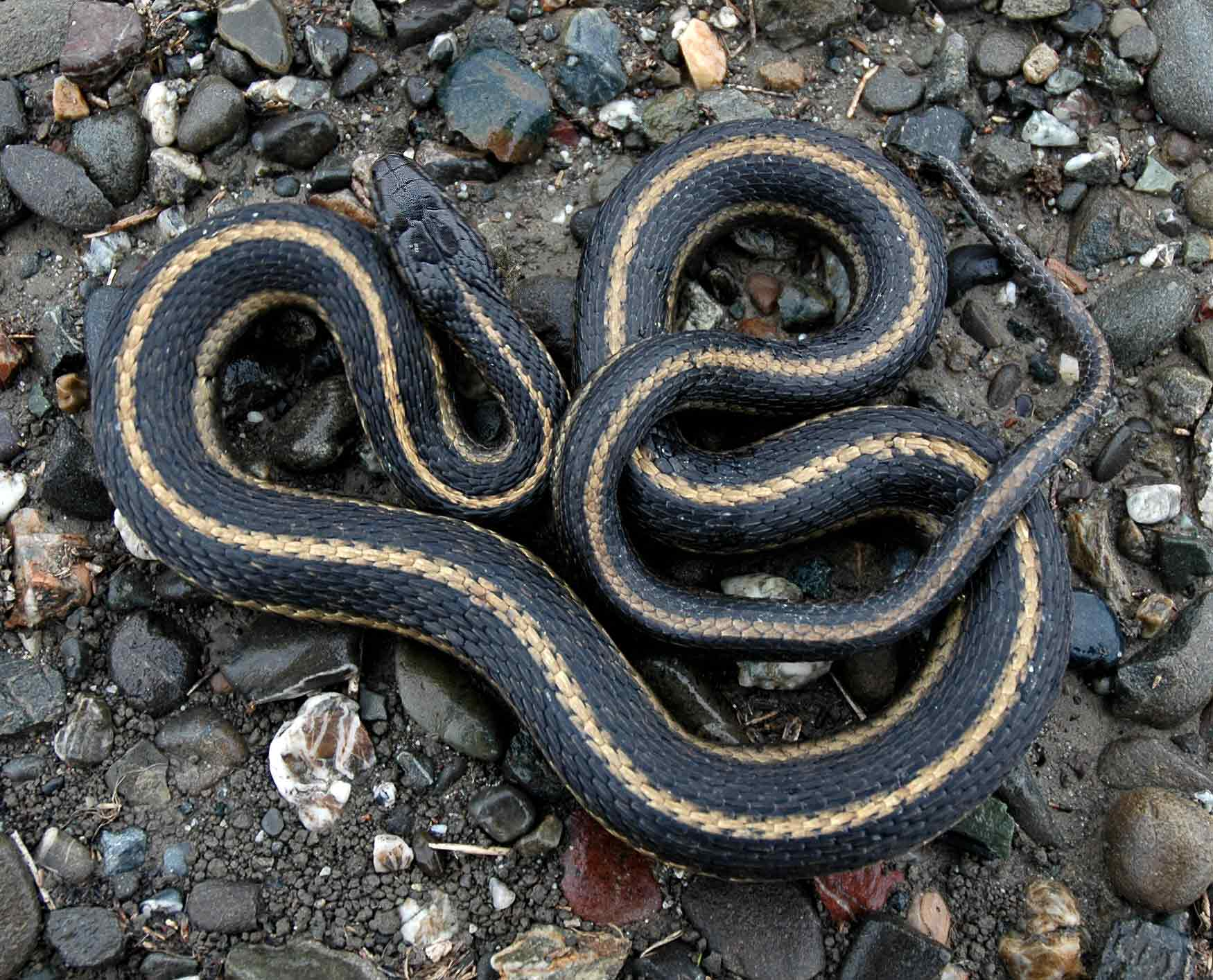

Conservation status
- Vulnerable (IUCN 3.1)

- Imperiled (NatureServe)

Scientific classification
- Kingdom: Animalia
- Phylum: Chordata
- Class: Reptilia
- Order: Squamata
- Suborder: Serpentes
- Family: Colubridae
- Genus: Thamnophis
- Species: T. gigas

Binomial name
- Thamnophis gigas Fitch, 1940
- IUCN Red List range map for Thamnophis gigas, Version 2021-2

= Giant garter snake =

Species of snake

The giant garter snake (Thamnophis gigas) is the largest species of garter snake. Relatively rare, it is a semi-aquatic snake with a limited distribution in the wetlands of central California.

== Description ==
The giant garter snake is the largest species of garter snake, with the adult snakes ranging from 94–165 cm (37.0–65.0 in) in length. As with many snakes, the female giant garter snakes tend to be longer and larger than the males. The snakes have keeled scales, with a yellow dorsal stripe against two additional yellow stripes on either side that run the length of its body. Although, some unstriped checkered patterns have been observed. It is venomous, but harmless to humans; it possesses a very mild neurotoxic venom that helps subdue its prey. A bite to a human will at most give a red itchy rash around the area of the bite.

== Distribution ==
The giant garter snake is found in Central California. Its historic range extends through much of Central California's Sacramento and San Joaquin valleys but has been reduced to a few fragmented areas in the Sacramento Valley. Due to its semiaquatic nature, it is rarely found more than a few meters from water during the active season. This reliance on water has prevented the giant garter snake from dispersing to new habitats effectively and is also responsible for fragmenting populations of the snake, as the areas between habitats are often inhospitable for it. Because of this, giant garter snakes are typically found in areas that they inhabited previously, even if those areas were destroyed or converted. The snake historically inhabited wetland habitats, particularly tule marshes, but due to the destruction of these habitats, it is now predominantly found in artificial wetlands associated with rice agriculture.

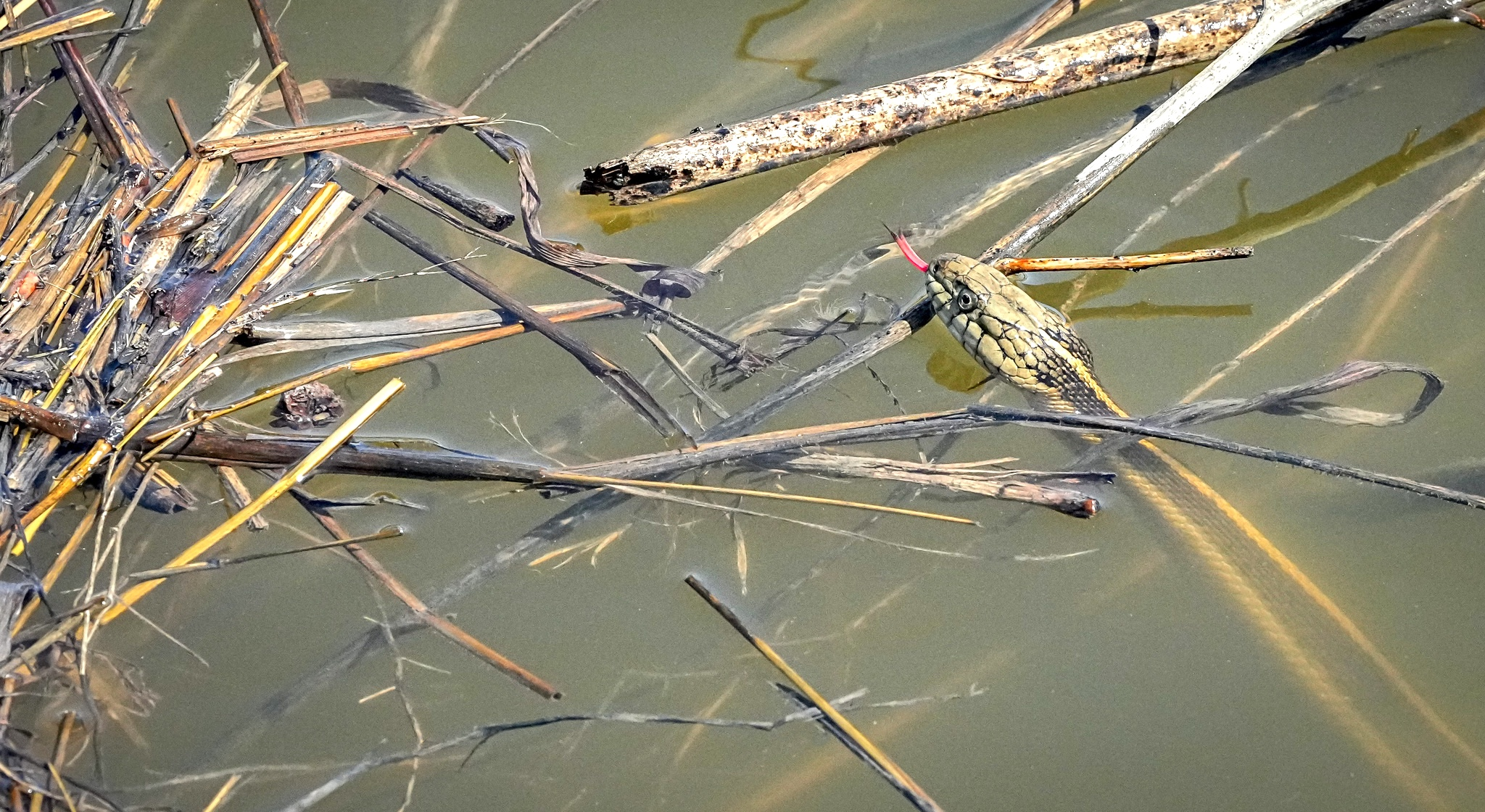
A Giant Garter Snake briefly sticking its head above water.

Giant garter snakes prefer to inhabit stagnant or slow-moving water bodies with emergent vegetation; they use water to thermoregulate and deep and fast-moving water bodies are too cold, while emergent vegetation protects them from predators. Despite their dependence on water, giant garter snakes spend most of their time on land during the active season and all their time in brumation on land during the winter. They spend most of their time on land underground. When not underground, they seek litter or vegetation (particularly tules) to use as cover from predators and environmental extremes, and they avoid rocky or otherwise open areas. Giant garter snakes associated with rice agriculture use rice field canals during the spring and autumn and use rice fields throughout the active season, as they provide good habitat for the snakes with plentiful food, water, and cover. Due to habitat destruction, most giant garter snakes live in rice agricultural wetlands, and thus most live on private property, which provides a barrier to their study and conservation.

== Behaviour and ecology ==
Giant garter snakes are active during the day from spring to late fall and will over-winter in terrestrial environments before emerging the following spring. Highly aquatic, it is active when water temperatures are at 68 °F (20 °C) or more and is dormant underground when its aquatic habitat is below this temperature. They have several natural predators, particularly young snakes fall victim to American bullfrogs and California kingsnakes. Giant garters are prey for various raptor birds and have evolved a fast diving behaviour to avoid them. Like other garter snakes, the giant garter snake can release a foul-smelling musk from its cloaca if threatened or disturbed.

=== Diet ===
Due to their predominately aquatic lifestyle, giant garter snakes prey upon fish, frogs, and tadpoles. Historically they would prey upon local species such as the Sierran treefrog, but in current times their diet predominately consists of introduced species, most notably the American bullfrog.

=== Reproduction ===
Starting in March to mid May, male giant garter snakes emerge from hibernation search for a female to mate with. Because giant garter snakes hibernation dens are typically more spread out compared to other garter snakes, male snakes must expend more energy to find a potential mate. There is a difference observed between male and female reproductive strategies. Males were observed to have a decreased body condition during early spring, as a result of allocating energy towards mate searching and reproductive opportunities, forgoing growth and feeding. Alternatively, females were seen to have an increase in body condition around the same time, which is thought to support embryo development. Gravid female snakes have also been observed to be basking more frequently compared to males and non-gravid females, as it is thought the warmth facilitates the growth of the embryos. Giant garter snakes are ovoviviparous, meaning they carry eggs internally but give live birth. Following the spring mating season, birthing occurs from mid July to early October with average litter size of 17 young. Larger female snakes tend to produce more offspring compared to smaller females, rather than producing fewer but larger young. The size of the young is also heavily linked to availability of resources in any given year.

== Conservation biology ==
Destruction of wetland and habitat has been so widespread that this species is listed as endangered by the state and federal governments. The giant garter snake populations of the San Joaquin Valley are now tiny disconnected remnants. It has been extirpated from 98% of the former San Joaquin habitat. The giant garter snake has fared better in the Sacramento Valley because rice cultivation and the associated canals have provided habitat. When rice land is fallowed, populations seem to then move away from adjacent ditches. Attempts are underway to restore artificial wetlands to provide quality habitat for the giant garter snake, but it is too early to know if these efforts will significantly aid the recovery of this threatened species.

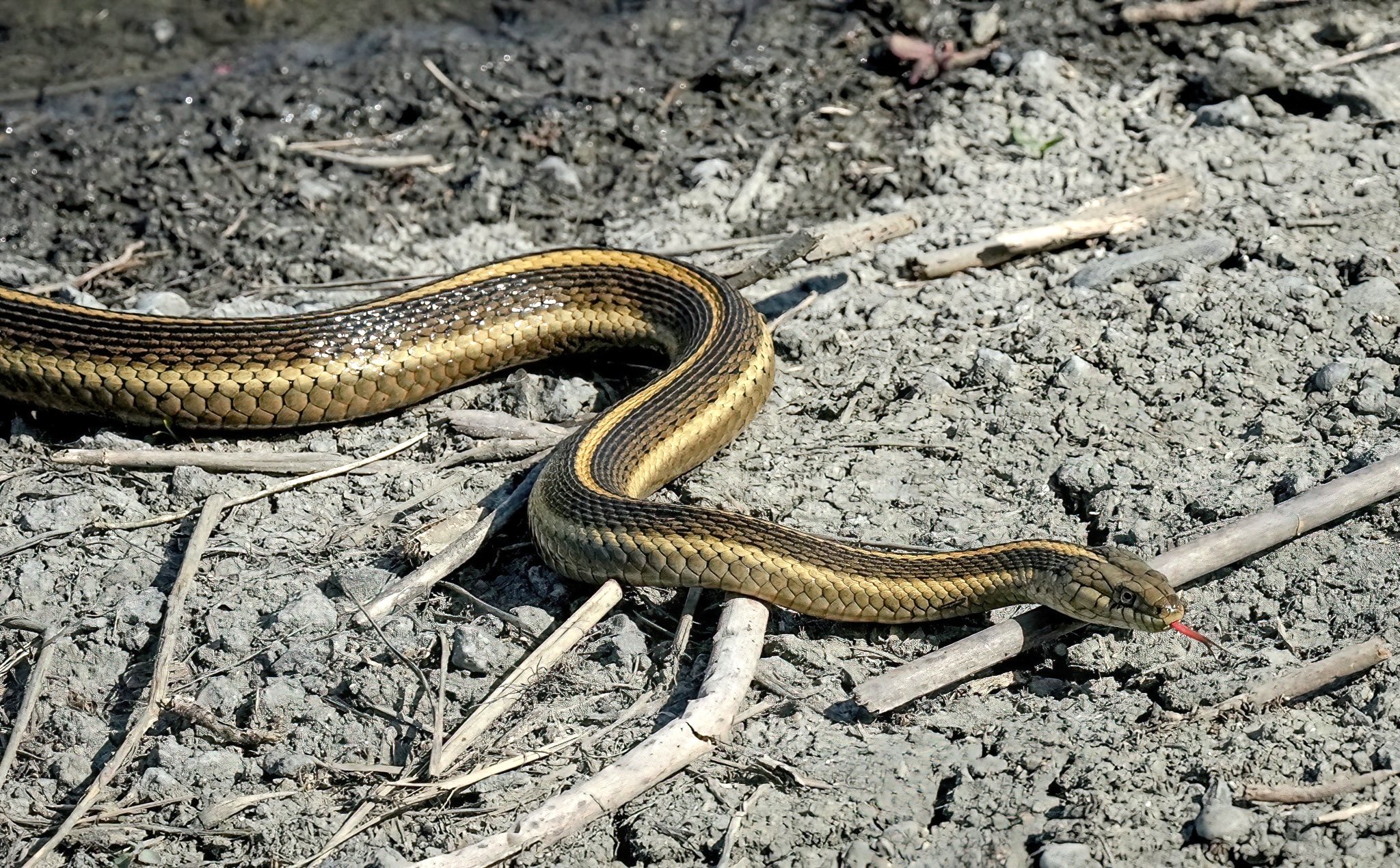
A Giant Garter Snake makes its way up on the shore to bask in the midday sun.

In addition to habitat loss and fragmentation, introduced predators such as the American bullfrog and the northern water snake may also be suppressing recovery. Adult bullfrogs predate giant garter snake young. Adult giant garter snakes will commonly eat bullfrog juveniles and tadpoles, which may put them at increased risk for parasite contraction. Adult garter snakes attempting to consume invasive bullhead may be killed by the fish's sharp spines. Additionally, giant garter snakes have been found to have increased levels of heavy metals such as mercury in their bloodstream as a result of preying upon mercury rich fish. However, further research is needed to determine if there are any detrimental effects of this on the snakes themselves.
