= San Joaquin River National Wildlife Refuge =

Wildlife refuge in California, US

- IUCN category IV (habitat/species management area)
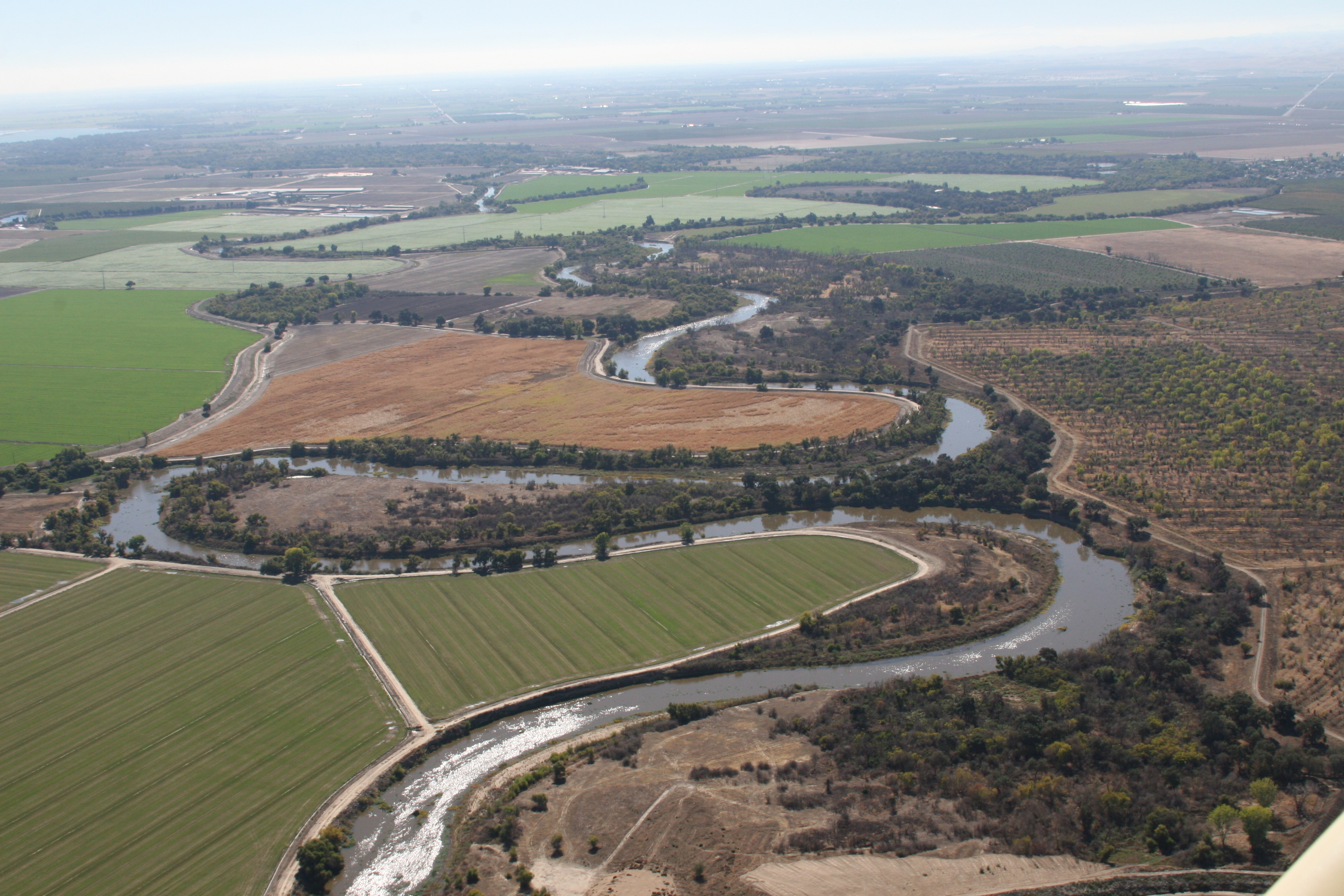

- Location within the United States
- Location: San Joaquin County, Stanislaus County, California, United States
- Nearest city: Modesto, California
- Coordinates: 37°37′33″N 121°12′05″W
- Area: 7,000 acres (28 km^{2})
- Established: 1987
- Governing body: U.S. Fish and Wildlife Service
- Website: San Joaquin River National Wildlife Refuge

The San Joaquin River National Wildlife Refuge is a protected area of along the San Joaquin River in the northern San Joaquin Valley, California. It is within San Joaquin County and Stanislaus County.

It protects more than 7,000 acres (28 km^{2}) of riparian woodlands, wetlands, and grasslands and hosts a diversity of native wildlife.

Established in 1987 under the authority of the Endangered Species and Migratory Bird Conservation Acts, the refuge has also played a major role in the recovery of Aleutian cackling geese.

== Riparian forest ==
Within the borders of the San Joaquin National Wildlife Refuge is one of California's largest riparian forest restoration projects. 400,000 native trees have been planted across 1,700 acres (6.9 km^{2}) of the river's floodplain. The major project was led by River Partners, Inc., a non-profit organization committed to restoring riparian zone habitat for wildlife.

Riparian forests, which once covered large portions of California's Central Valley, have been greatly reduced due to state and federal water projects and diversions. The riparian habitat is host to many rare animals. Swainson's hawks nest in the canopy of tall cottonwood trees. Herons and cormorants form communal nesting colonies within the tops of the large oaks on Christman Island. Endangered riparian brush rabbits have been reintroduced to their historic habitat from captive-reared populations. This population has been negatively impacted by the destruction of their riparian habitat. Another subspecies, the San José brush rabbit, is considered critically endangered.
