= Merced National Wildlife Refuge =

Nature reserve in California

- IUCN category IV (habitat/species management area)
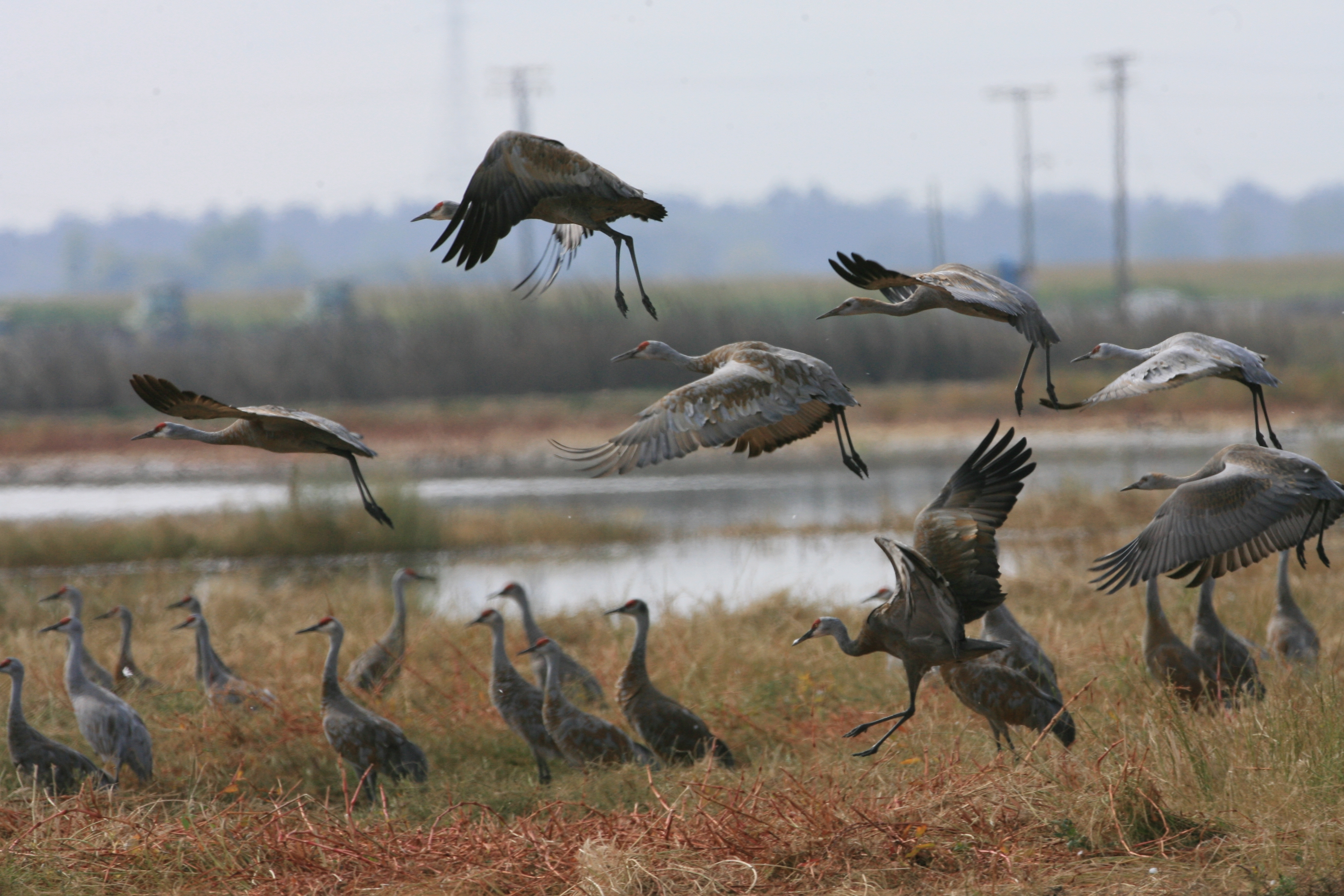
- A flock of sandhill cranes landing

- Location within the United States
- Location: Merced County, California, United States
- Nearest city: Merced, California
- Coordinates: 37°10′45″N 120°38′12″W
- Area: 10,262 acres (41.53 km^{2})
- Established: 1951
- Governing body: U.S. Fish and Wildlife Service
- Website: Merced National Wildlife Refuge

The Merced National Wildlife Refuge encompasses 10,262 acres (41.53 km^{2}) of wetlands, native grasslands, vernal pools, and riparian areas in California. It was established in 1951 under the Lea Act to attract wintering waterfowl from adjacent farmland where their foraging was causing crop damage. In the last few decades, changes in agricultural practices and refuge management have reduced these wildlife/crop issues.

The refuge plays host to the largest wintering populations of lesser sandhill cranes and Ross's geese within the Pacific Flyway. Each autumn over 20,000 cranes and 60,000 arctic nesting geese terminate their annual migrations from Alaska and Canada to make the refuge home for six months. Here they mingle with thousands of other visiting waterfowl, waterbirds and shorebirds making the refuge a true winter phenomenon.

The refuge also provides important breeding habitat for Swainson's hawks, tri-colored blackbirds, marsh wrens, mallards, gadwall, cinnamon teal, and burrowing owls. Tri-colored blackbirds, a colonial-nesting songbird, breed in colonies of over 25,000 pairs. Coyotes, ground squirrels, desert cottontail rabbits, beaver, and long-tailed weasels can also be seen year-round.

Vernal pools are another type of wetland found on the Merced National Wildlife Refuge. These special pools form when natural shallow depressions underlaid with clay soils fill with winter rainwater. The pools come to life as they fill with water: fairy and tadpole shrimp emerge from cysts embedded in the soils the previous year. The endangered tiger salamander, along with other amphibians, lays eggs and rear tadpoles. The vast number of aquatic invertebrates found in these pools provides a food source for wintering and migrating birds as they prepare for the long flight north to their breeding grounds.

As spring arrives and the water in the vernal pools evaporates, wildflowers – such as goldfields, purple owl's clover, and butter-and-eggs – germinate in colorful patterns of thick rings or halos around the pool basins. Once the vernal pools have dried out, Downingia and Colusa grass, a rare California species, appear in the parched basins. This annual coloring led John Muir to describe the valley floor as the "floweriest part of the world" he had seen.

In addition to managing natural habitats, the Merced National Wildlife Refuge contains approximately 300 acres (1.2 km^{2}) of cultivated corn and winter wheat crops and over 500 acres (2.0 km^{2}) of irrigated pasture for wildlife. Not only do these managed agricultural areas provide important sources of nutrition (carbohydrates) to the tens of thousands of arctic-nesting geese and sandhill cranes that make Merced County their winter home, they also help ensure that the birds will have adequate nutrient stores to make the long migration to their northern breeding grounds. Local farmers, under agreements with the refuge, oversee the ground preparation, seeding, and irrigation of these croplands. The refuge incorporates a livestock grazing program that works in partnership with local ranchers and farmers. Grazing cattle and sheep is a management tool used by the refuge to help control invasive weeds, provide and maintain short stature grasslands for goose grazing, and encourage native grasslands to thrive.
