= Francisco Pérez Pacheco =

Californio ranchero, soldier, and prominent public figure

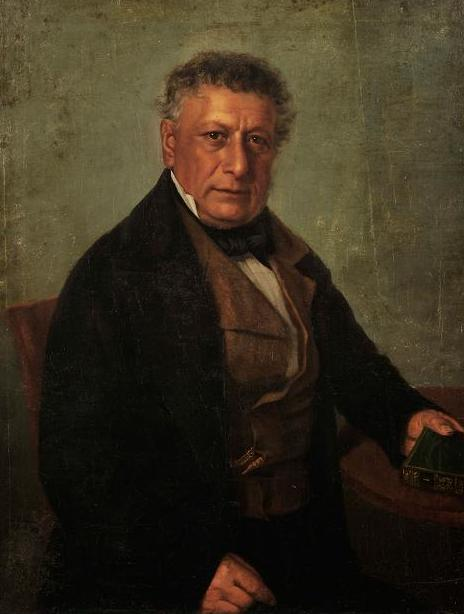
- Portrait by Leonardo Barbieri, 1852.
- Born: 1790
- Died: 1860 (aged 69–70)
- Occupations: Ranchero, soldier
- Spouse: Feliciana Gonzales de Pacheco

Don Francisco Pérez Pacheco (Spanish pronunciation: [/.doʊn frænˈsɪskoʊ ˈpɛrɛz ˈpætʃɛkoʊ/] Don Fran-SIS-ko PE-res Pa-CHE-ko) was a Californio ranchero, soldier, and prominent public figure. He was the recipient of numerous rancho grants and become one of the largest landowners in Monterey and San Benito Counties. Today numerous locations are named after him, including Pacheco State Park and Pacheco Pass landform.

== Early life ==
Pacheco was born in Guadalajara, Jalisco in 1790. He trained as a carriage maker by trade prior to emigrating to Alta California in 1819. There he enlisted as a soldier at the Presidio of Monterey.

In 1824, Pacheco successfully suppressed a revolt at Mission La Purísima Concepción, earning him the title of lieutenant.

In 1827, he was elected as a delegate of the Diputación de Alta California (California's legislature), serving until 1846.

Pacheco spent a good portion of his life acquiring various ranchos of California. He was granted Rancho Ausaymas y San Felipe, located in southern Santa Clara County and northern San Benito County, in two parts: San Felipe in 1833 by Governor José Figueroa and Ausaymas in 1836 by Governor Nicolás Gutiérrez.

He was granted Rancho Bolsa de San Felipe, in San Benito County, in 1840 by Governor Juan Bautista Alvarado.

He bought Rancho San Justo, in San Benito County, from José Castro in 1850.

Following his son Juan Carlos Pacheco's death in 1855, he inherited Rancho San Luis Gonzaga in Merced County.

== Personal life ==
He married Feliciana Gonzales de Pacheco, sometime prior to 1813. They had their first daughter, Ponciana Pacheco, in 1813. In 1814, Jacinta Pacheco was born (who married Sebastián Núñez, grantee of Rancho Orestimba y Las Garzas). In 1820, his first son, Isidro de la Santíssima Pacheco, was born, followed by Juan Carlos Pacheco in 1821 (who was the grantee of Rancho San Luis Gonzaga). In 1822, his eldest daughter Ponciana died and was buried at Mission San Carlos Borromeo. In 1826, his daughter María Encarnación Pacheco was born, followed by María Isidora Pacheco in 1829 (who married Mariano Malarín, owner of Rancho Zanjones, Rancho Chualar, and Rancho Guadalupe y Llanitos de los Correos) and Antonio Julián Pacheco in 1830.

== Legacy ==
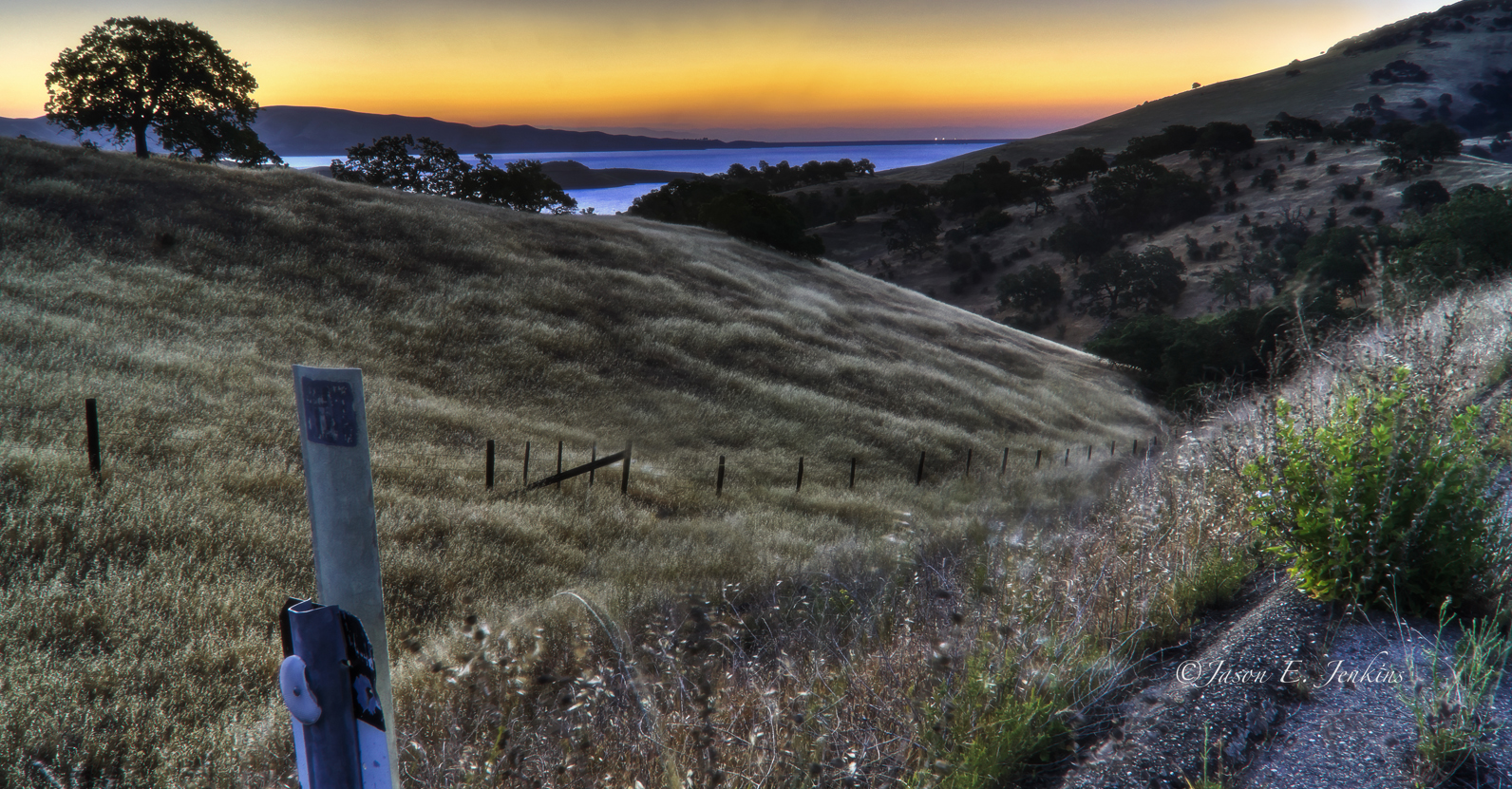
Pacheco State Park in Merced County.

Numerous California locations are named after Pacheco, especially in the lands of his rancho holdings. Pacheco State Park in Merced County is named after him along with Pacheco Canyon landform within its borders. The land for the park was bequeathed to California State Parks by Pacheco's great-great-granddaughter Paula Fatjó in 1992.

Also the Pacheco Pass in the Diablo Mountains, Pacheco Pass Highway, and Pacheco Creek in San Benito County maintains the area's history.

The Pacheco Club, an exclusive members-only social club in Monterey, is so named and housed in the Casa Pacheco, an adobe home built by Pacheco in 1840.
