= Rancho Bolsa de San Felipe =

Land grant in Mexican Alta California

Coordinates: 36.910°N 121.420°W

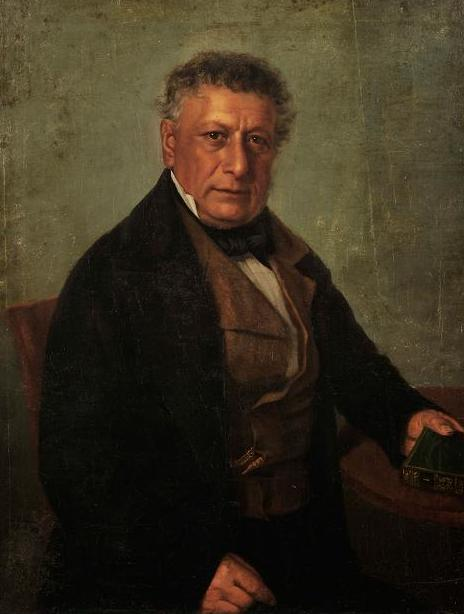
Don Francisco Pérez Pacheco was granted Rancho Bolsa de San Felipe in 1840.

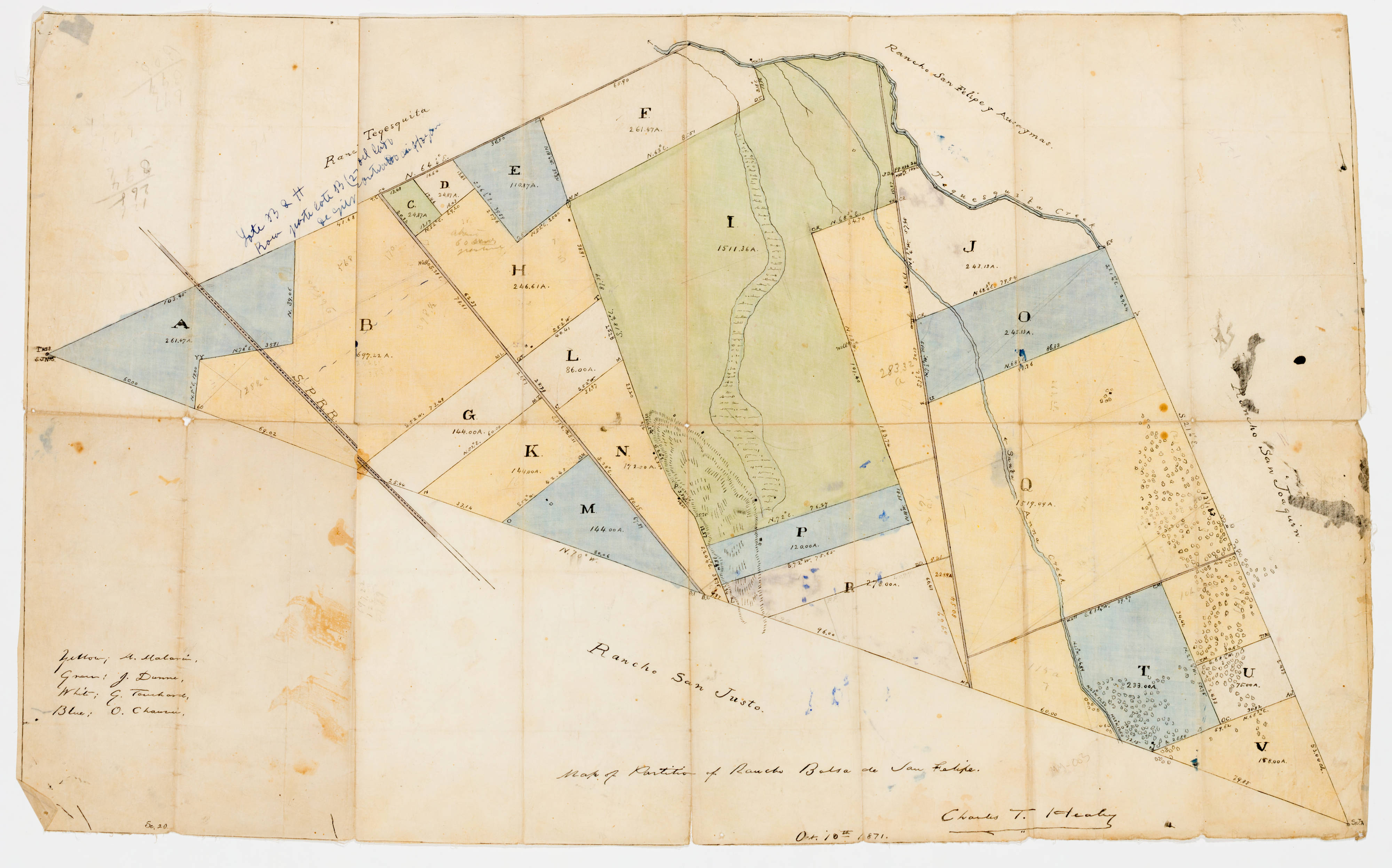
Map of Partition of Rancho Bolsa de San Felipe, by Charles T. Healy, 1871 (Santa Clara University Library)

Rancho Bolsa de San Felipe was a 6,795-acre (27.50 km^{2}) Mexican land grant in present-day San Benito County, California given in 1840 by Governor Juan B. Alvarado to Don Francisco Pérez Pacheco. Bolsa means "pockets" and refers to pockets of land in the Tequisquita Slough. The grant was bounded on the north by Rancho Ausaymas y San Felipe and the south by Rancho San Justo, and encompassed Dunneville.

== History ==
The two square league grant was made to Francisco Pérez Pacheco, who was the owner of Rancho Ausaymas y San Felipe and Rancho San Justo. Francisco Perez Pacheco (1790–1860), born in Mexico, came to Monterey in 1819.

In 1840, his daughter María Jacinta Pacheco (1813 – ) married Sebastián Nuñez, grantee of Rancho Orestimba y Las Garzas. In 1850, his daughter María Isidora Pacheco (1829–1892) married Mariano Malarin (1827–1895), son of the grantee of Rancho Chualar.

With the cession of California to the United States following the Mexican-American War, the 1848 Treaty of Guadalupe Hidalgo provided that the land grants would be honored. As required by the Land Act of 1851, a claim for Rancho Bolsa de San Felipe was filed with the Public Land Commission in 1852. The district court, while upholding the Pacheco title, limited it to one square league. Isidora Pacheco de Malarin and Sebastián Nuñez, who were the executors of Francisco Pérez Pacheco's estate, appealed the district court ruling to the US Supreme Court. In 1863, the court validated a grant of two square leagues even though the original document had been altered, changing it from one square league to two. The grant was patented to Francisco Pérez Pacheco in 1871.

James Dunne (-1874), who had come from Ireland to join the California Gold Rush, bought Rancho Bolsa de San Felipe and half of Rancho Ausaymas y San Felipe from Francisco Pérez Pacheco. In 1862, James Dunne married Catherine O'Toole Murphy widow of Bernard Martin of Rancho San Francisco de las Llagas.

== See also ==
- Ranchos of California
- List of Ranchos of California
