= Snelling, California =

- Census-designated place
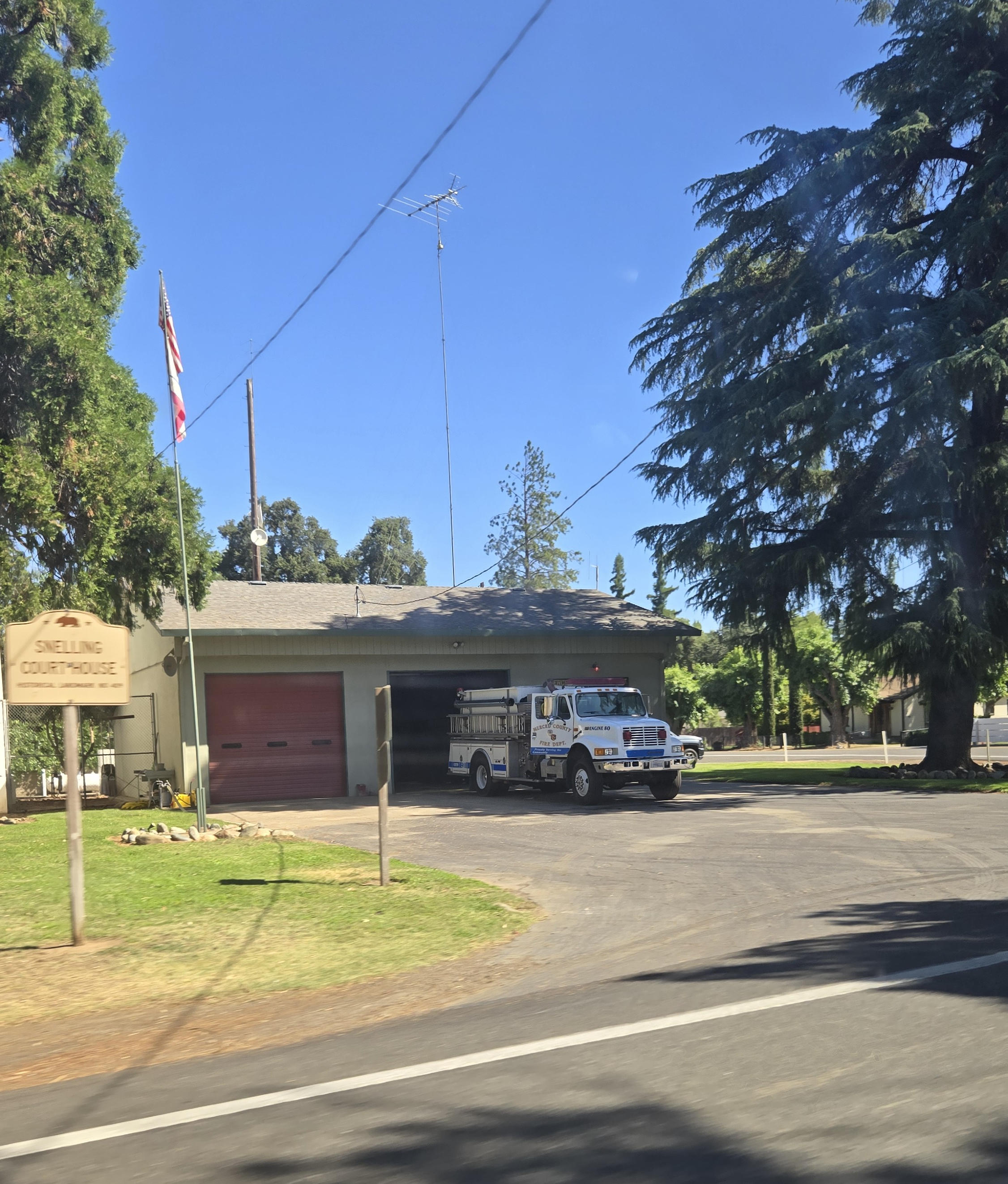
- Station 65 of the Merced County Fire Department, located in Snelling.

- Location within California Location within the United States
- Coordinates: 37°31′09″N 120°26′15″W
- Country: United States
- State: California
- County: Merced

Area
  - Total: 0.545 sq mi (1.41 km^{2})
  - Land: 0.540 sq mi (1.40 km^{2})
  - Water: 0 sq mi (0 km^{2}) 0%
- Elevation: 256 ft (78 m)

Population (2020)
  - Total: 238
  - Density: 440.7/sq mi (170.2/km^{2})
- Time zone: UTC-8 (Pacific (PST))
  - Summer (DST): UTC-7 (PDT)
- ZIP Code: 95369
- Area code: 209
- GNIS feature IDs: 234756; 2583146

Snelling (formerly Snelling's Ranch) is an unincorporated community and census-designated place (CDP) in Merced County, California, United States. It is located on the north bank of the Merced River, 17 miles (27 km) north of Merced, at an elevation of 256 feet (78 m). The population was 238 at the 2020 census.

== History ==
The "Snelling Ranch" post office opened in 1853, was closed for a time during 1861, and changed its name to "Snelling" in 1870. The name is from the Snelling family that operated a way station at the place beginning in 1851.

Snelling's zip code is 95369 and its area code is 209.

Snelling was the county seat of Merced County from 1857 to 1872. The courthouse constructed in 1857 continued to serve as a justice court until the 1990s. The two-story building remains standing today and is a rare surviving example of a simple early California courthouse.

== Geography ==
Snelling is in northeastern Merced County along the eastern edge of California's Central Valley, where the Merced River emerges from the foothills of the Sierra Nevada. It is at the north end of California State Route 59, which leads south to Merced, the county seat.

According to the United States Census Bureau, the Snelling CDP covers an area of 0.5 square miles (1.3 km^{2}), of which 0.005 square miles (0.013 km^{2}), or 0.92%, are water.

Historical population
Census	Pop.	Note	%±
2010	231		—
2020	238		3.0%
U.S. Decennial Census; 1850–1870 1880-1890; 1900 1910 1920; 1930 1940 1950; 1960 1970 1980; 1990 2000 2010

Snelling first appeared as a census designated place in the 2010 U.S. census.

The 2020 United States census reported that Snelling had a population of 238. The population density was 440.7 inhabitants per square mile (170.2/km^{2}). The racial makeup of Snelling was 186 (78.2%) White, 0 (0.0%) African American, 3 (1.3%) Native American, 1 (0.4%) Asian, 0 (0.0%) Pacific Islander, 19 (8.0%) from other races, and 29 (12.2%) from two or more races. Hispanic or Latino of any race were 38 persons (16.0%).

The whole population lived in households. There were 96 households, out of which 27 (28.1%) had children under the age of 18 living in them, 43 (44.8%) were married-couple households, 16 (16.7%) were cohabiting couple households, 15 (15.6%) had a female householder with no partner present, and 22 (22.9%) had a male householder with no partner present. 26 households (27.1%) were one person, and 17 (17.7%) were one person aged 65 or older. The average household size was 2.48. There were 59 families (61.5% of all households).

The age distribution was 56 people (23.5%) under the age of 18, 14 people (5.9%) aged 18 to 24, 55 people (23.1%) aged 25 to 44, 63 people (26.5%) aged 45 to 64, and 50 people (21.0%) who were 65 years of age or older. The median age was 43.3 years. For every 100 females, there were 118.3 males.

There were 110 housing units at an average density of 203.7 units per square mile (78.6 units/km^{2}), of which 96 (87.3%) were occupied. Of these, 40 (41.7%) were owner-occupied, and 56 (58.3%) were occupied by renters.

== Government ==
In the California State Legislature, Snelling is in the 4th senatorial district, represented by Republican Marie Alvarado-Gil, and in the 22nd Assembly district, represented by Republican Juan Alanis.

In the United States House of Representatives, Snelling is in California's 13th congressional district, represented by Democrat Adam Gray as of January 2025.

== Education ==
The city has the Snelling-Merced Falls Elementary School that serves K-8. It falls within the Snelling-Merced Falls Union Elementary District, with it being the district's only school.

According to Niche, a national education-ranking agency, it has an overall grade of B+. The school has 56 students, with 25% (around 14 students) proficient in math and 55% (around 31 students) proficient in reading.

The closest high school to Snelling is El Captain High School in Merced, around a 14-16 minute drive.

UC Merced is also close to the city, being only a 17-minute drive. It is a four-year public university in the University of California system.

== Infrastructure ==
=== Transportation ===
State Route 59 runs directly through the city before abruptly ending at the Snelling city line at a three-way intersection with County Route J59 (La Grange Road) and County Route J16 (Merced Falls Road). SR-59 leads to State Route 99 and State Route 140 in Merced and State Route 152 near El Nido. County Route J59 leads to State Route 132 in La Grange and State Route 120 in rural Tuolumne County near Oakdale, California. County Route J16 leads to Interstate 5 near Westley and California State Route 49 near Hornitos.

=== California Historical Landmark ===
Snelling Courthouse is a California Historical Landmark, number 409.

The California Historical Landmark reads:

NO. 409 SNELLING COURTHOUSE - This, the first courthouse in Merced County, was erected in 1857. This monument commemorates the 75th anniversary of the organization of Merced County and is dedicated to the memory of our pioneers by Yosemite Parlor No. 24, N.S.G.W., Merced, May 20, 1930.

== See also ==
- California Historical Landmarks in Merced County
- History of California through 1899
