= Hecker Pass =

Mountain pass in California

- Location within California
- Elevation: 1,339 feet (408 m)
- Traversed by: SR 152

Location
- Location: Between Santa Cruz County and Santa Clara County.
- Range: Santa Cruz Mountains
- Coordinates: 36°59′40″N 121°43′02″W

Hecker Pass is a low mountain pass across the Santa Cruz Mountains of central California, connecting Watsonville on the Pacific coast to Gilroy and the Santa Clara Valley. It is traversed by Hecker Pass Road, the western part of California State Route 152, which continues east from Gilroy across Pacheco Pass and into the Central Valley. Mt. Madonna County Park lies to the north of the pass. The pass's elevation is 1,339 feet (408 m).

Santa Clara County supervisor Henry Hecker, a nephew of Friedrich Hecker, became the namesake of the pass on May 27, 1928, at the opening of the "Yosemite-to-the-Sea Highway" over it. In the 1930s, flooding on creeks near the highway caused the collapse of a bridge and the closing of the pass. In 1941, a landslide closed the pass, and in 1947 and 1959, the pass was again closed because of landslides caused by earthquakes.

The Hecker Strawberry, a strawberry variety introduced in 1979 in Davis, California, is named after the pass.

== See also ==
- List of mountain passes in California
