= David Jacks (businessman) =

American businessman (1822–1909)

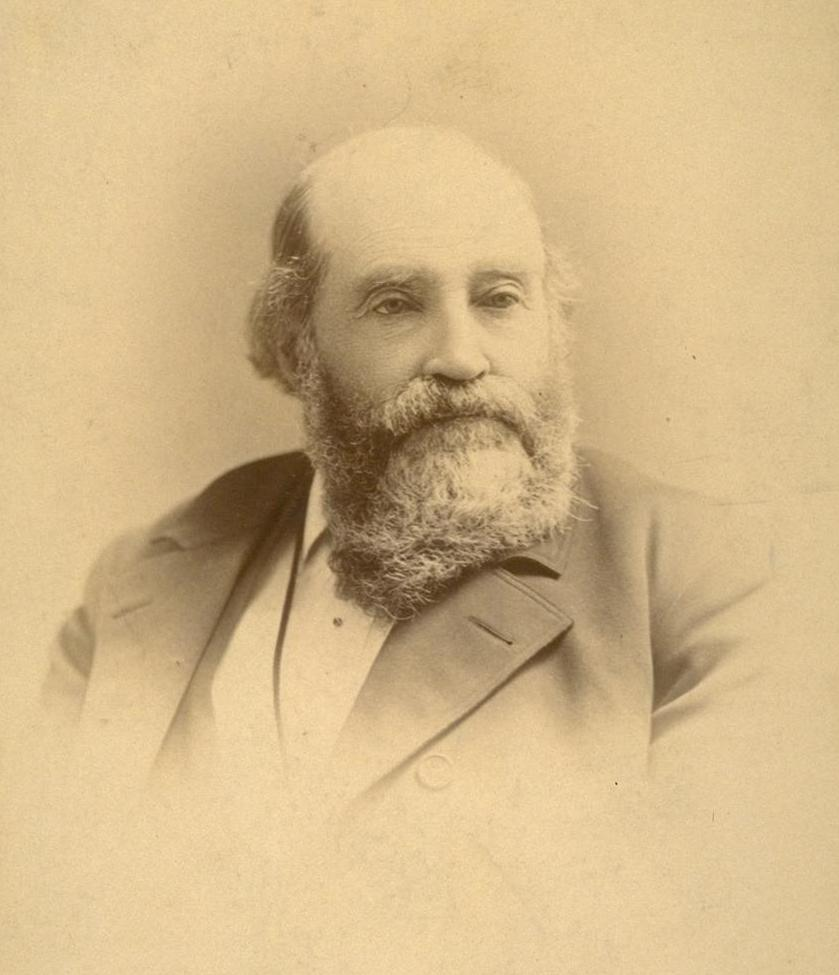
- David Jacks, c. 1880s
- Born: David Jack; April 18, 1822; Crieff, Perthshire, Scotland
- Died: January 11, 1909 (aged 86); Monterey, California
- Occupations: Land speculator, developer, businessman, university trustee
- Known for: Monterey Jack cheese
- Spouse: Maria Cristina Soledad Romie
- Children: Jane; Louise L.; William; Mary R.; Margarete A.; Romie C.; Vida G.

David Jacks (18 April 1822 – 11 January 1909) was a powerful Californian landowner, developer, and businessman. Born in Scotland, he emigrated to California during the 1849 Gold Rush, and soon acquired several thousand acres in and around Monterey, shaping the history of Monterey County in the first decades of American possession. He is also credited as being the first to market and popularize Monterey Jack cheese. He was born David Jack, but took to spelling his last name "Jacks" once in California.

== Early life ==
David Jacks was born on 18 April 1822, in Crieff, Perthshire, Scotland, the sixth of nine children of William Jack and the first of three William had by his second wife Janet McEwan. Little is known of Jack's early life, though he may have worked at handloom weaving. In 1841, he migrated to America to join two older brothers on Long Island, New York.

== Career ==
After several years working as an army contractor in Brooklyn, where he reputedly met Captain Robert E. Lee, Jack read about the 1848 finding of gold in the Sierra Nevada. In November of that year he sailed with an artillery regiment to California, arriving in San Francisco in April 1849. Having invested in revolvers Jacks made a $4,000 profit upon landing in San Francisco, and then took up a job at the city's Customs House.

In 1850, Jacks moved to Monterey, California initially taking up a job in the store of a fellow Scotsman, James McKinlay. By 1852 Jack had been elected Treasurer of Monterey County, California and began purchasing land in the area.

Jacks soon involved himself in the settlement of Mexican land claims in the new State of California, a process that would lead to his becoming Monterey's dominant landowner. In 1853 the Pueblo of Monterey contracted Delos Rodeyn Ashley to help legalize its title to some 30,000 acres (120 km^{2}) of land on the Monterey Peninsula. Ashley was successful, and billed the city nearly $1,000 for his services. When the city could not pay, he suggested the city auction some of its land. They advertised the auction in a newspaper, as legally required, but in Santa Cruz. Ashley and Jacks were the only two bidders, and purchased the entire tract underlying the city for $1002.50 on 9 February 1859.

The sale was controversial, and the city of Monterey filed suit against Jacks claiming the sale was illegitimate. The case eventually reached the US Supreme Court in 1906, which ruled in favor of Jacks.

In 1869, Ashley turned his interest in the land over to Jacks, who now owned the tract outright. Included in this tract are what is now the cities of Monterey, Pacific Grove, Seaside, and Del Rey Oaks along with the Del Monte Forest (better known as Pebble Beach), and Fort Ord, now the home of California State University, Monterey Bay.

By 1873, Jacks had acquired 36,000 acres (14,569 ha) of land. The land he eventually owned included Rancho Punta de Pinos, Rancho Pescadero, Rancho Aguajito, Rancho Noche Buena, Rancho Saucito, Rancho El Tucho, Rancho Chamisal, Rancho El Toro, Rancho Buena Vista, Rancho El Alisal, Rancho Chualar, Rancho Zanjones, and Rancho Los Coches. He started cutting up large tracts of land south of Salinas into ranches for farmers to buy or rent. Jacks's business practices created a great deal of antipathy in the community. Jacks was a willing lender of money and of mortgages to those living on his land, but also was quick to foreclose. As a result, animosity toward him ran high, and it has been claimed he had to travel with bodyguards anywhere he went in Monterey County. The author Robert Louis Stevenson, after visiting Monterey, claimed that famed San Francisco orator Denis Kearney had suggested the residents should deal with Jack by having him hanged.

In June 1874, Henry Cerruti, in the employ of Hubert Howe Bancroft, interviewed Dorotea Valdez, whose father was Juan Bautista Valdez, a member of the Portola expedition. Dorotea lived in a pueblo, which she asserted was illegally obtained by Jacks. When Cerutti asked her if she knew him, this is what she said:

Señor Jacks is the owner of the pueblo. In my opinion he is a very mean man, a cunning rascal, and pious hypocrite. He is such a miser that he even denies his own wife and children the comforts of life. At the present time, Jacks considers himself a millionaire. But as soon the railroad begins to operate, many foreigners will come to settle here. Rest assured that is when Señor Jacks will receive the punishment he deserves. All we want is for some clever lawyer to take the pueblo land away from him. The American authorities sold land that did not belong to them in order to pay off the debts. This is land that nobody had the right to give away because it rightfully belongs to every man woman and child who was born in our town. When the pueblo owned the land currently owned by David Jacks, people could just go out and gather the wood they needed. Our horses and cattle could graze everywhere and nobody bothered them. Ever since this evil man obtained possession of our land, he has placed fences everywhere. Even the famous well where the pirates landed in 1819 is surrounded by a fence. Señor Jacks is a natural born enemy of everything related to our history. He even tried to gain possession of the crops by the bridge. There is a live oak tree near those crops and it is under that very tree that Fr. Junìpero Serra said his first mass on June 7, 1770.

Jack was also involved in land development. In 1875, he donated land on the Monterey Peninsula to a Methodist retreat group, which founded the town of Pacific Grove, California.

In 1874 he helped found the Monterey and Salinas Railroad to compete with the dominant Southern Pacific Railroad, though Jack eventually had to sell the line to the SP.

Jacks helped to found what is now the community of Del Monte Forest, also known as Pebble Beach. In 1880, he sold 7,000 acres (2,833 ha) of land between Carmel and Pacific Grove to the Pacific Improvement Company, a company controlled by the so-called "Big Four" California railroad barons - Charles Crocker, Mark Hopkins, Leland Stanford, and Collis P. Huntington.

=== Monterey Jack Cheese ===
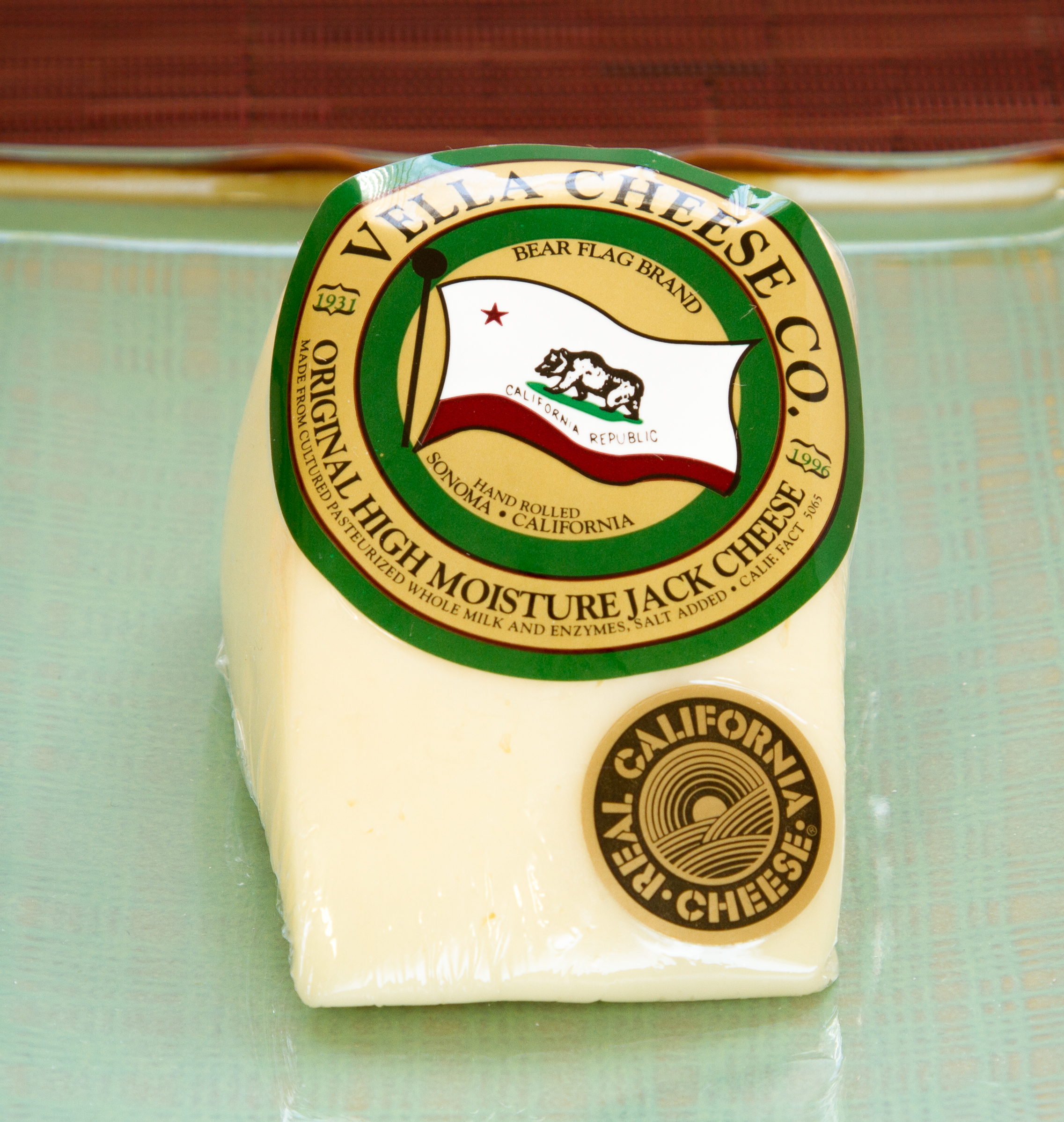
Monterey Jack Vella Cheese

David Jacks has been credited with the popularization of what is today known as Monterey Jack cheese. A dairy Jack owned along the Salinas River produced a cheese originally known as Queso Blanco, first made by the Franciscan friars at the nearby Mission San Carlos Borromeo de Carmelo. Around 1883, when Jack's dairy went into partnership with other regional dairies, the cheese was mass marketed, which came to be known at first as "Jack's Cheese," and then as "Monterey" for the county and his own name, minus the "s" for "Monterey Jack."

There are competing claims to the origin of the name "Monterey Jack" cheese, including one by Domingo Pedrazzi of Carmel Valley, who argued that his use of a pressure jack gave the cheese its name. There are also claims that "Monterey Jack" cheese originated from the Victorine Ranch, south of Malpaso Creek in Carmel Highlands.

== Personal life and death ==
David Jacks married Maria Christina Soledad Romie (1837-1917) on April 20, 1861, in San Luis Obispo, California and produced nine children, with only seven surviving childhood.

In 1907, Jacks retired from the landowning business, turning his holdings over to a corporation controlled by his children. A devout Presbyterian, Jacks donated a great deal of money to religious causes later in life, including support of missionary work, as well as helping to found the Pacific Grove retreat. He was on the board of trustees of the University of the Pacific and helped to keep the school financially afloat in its early years.

He died on January 11, 1909, at his home in Monterey, at the age of 86. He was buried at the City of Monterey Cemetery (or Cementerio El Encinal).

== Legacy ==
Jacks last surviving heir, Margaret Anna Jacks (1874-1962), died in April 1962, and the remainder of his estate passed to various colleges and universities in California. The gift to Stanford University was the largest at the time since the founding grant, with two endowed professorships and a building in the main quad named for the family.

In 1919, Samuel F. B. Morse became manager of the Pacific Improvement Company, and formed the Del Monte Properties Company which finally developed Pebble Beach and the surrounding resorts.

Along with Monterey Jack cheese, many landmarks in and around Monterey are named for David Jack. These include Don Dahvee Park, and Jacks Peak, the highest point on the Monterey Peninsula, in Jacks Peak Park.
