= Rancho San Luis Gonzaga =

Land grant in California

Coordinates: 37.110°N 121.170°W

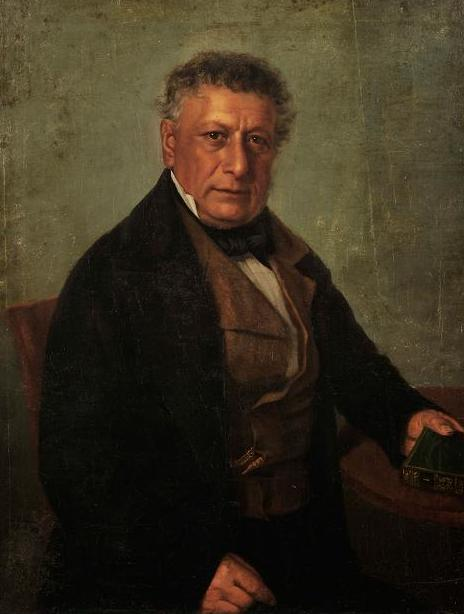
Don Francisco Pérez Pacheco's son, Juan Carlos Pacheco, was granted Rancho San Luis Gonzaga in 1843. Following Juan's death in 1855, Francisco inherited his son's rancho.

Rancho San Luis Gonzaga was a 48,821-acre (197.57 km^{2}) Mexican land grant in the Diablo Range, in present-day Santa Clara and Merced counties, California, United States, given in 1843 by Governor Manuel Micheltorena to Juan Carlos Pacheco and José Maria Mejía. The grant was bounded by Francisco Pérez Pacheco's Rancho Ausaymas y San Felipe on the west (at the top of present-day Pacheco Pass), the San Joaquin River and San Joaquin Valley on the east, and Los Baños Creek on the south.

== History ==
A grant was first made in 1841 to Francisco Jose Rivera of Monterey, but he returned to Mexico soon after and did not occupy the grant. The eleven square league grant was made to Juan Carlos Pacheco and José Maria Mejía in 1843. Three days later, Captain Mejia gave his half of the grant to Pacheco. Juan Perez Pacheco (1823–1855) was the son of Francisco Pérez Pacheco (1790–1860), grantee of Rancho Ausaymas y San Felipe. The rancho lay at a great crossroad where the road from Pacheco Pass into the San Joaquin Valley crossed the El Camino Viejo that lay along the west side of the valley. Its lands included the land and adobe ranch house of the old Spanish Rancho de Centinela (Sentinel Ranch) first established by pioneering stockmen from San Juan Bautista and Monterey as place to raise horses in 1810 and subsequently abandoned in the 1820s.

With the cession of California to the United States following the Mexican–American War, the 1848 Treaty of Guadalupe Hidalgo provided that the land grants would be honored. As required by the Land Act of 1851, a claim for Rancho San Luis Gonzaga was filed with the Public Land Commission in 1852, and the grant was patented to Juan Carlos Pacheco in 1871.

When Juan Carlos Pacheco died in 1855, the property went to his father, Francisco Pacheco. In 1858, the rancho became a stage station for the Butterfield Overland Mail.

Upon Francisco Pacheco's death in 1860, his only surviving child, Isidora Pacheco (1829–1892) inherited most of the Pacheco holdings. In 1850, Ysidora married Mariano Malarin (1827–1895) of Rancho Chualar. When María Isidora Pacheco died in 1892, her estate consisted of Rancho San Luis Gonzaga and half of Rancho Ausaymas y San Felipe.

Paula Fatjó, a great granddaughter of Ysidora and Mariano Malarin, inherited 16,000 acres (64.7 km^{2}) of the ranch land in 1948, and used it to raise horses and cattle. The majority of her property was condemned by the state of California in 1962 to create the San Luis Reservoir, and the original 1846 ranch house, which she had restored, was destroyed in an attempt to move it away from the area flooded by the new lake. Fatjó died on December 30, 1992, leaving the remaining 6,890 acres (27.9 km^{2}) to the California Parks System, where it forms what is now Pacheco State Park.

== See also ==
- Ranchos of California
- List of Ranchos of California
