= Rancho Pescadero (Barreto) =

Mexican land grant in California

Coordinates: 36.580°N 121.940°W

Rancho Pescadero (also called "Punta del Cipreses") was a 4,426-acre (17.91 km^{2}) Mexican land grant in present day Monterey County, California given in 1836 by Governor Nicolás Gutiérrez to Fabián Barreto. Pescadero means fishing place in Spanish. The grant extended along the Pacific coast from Rancho Punta de Pinos and Seal Rocks south to Carmel by the Sea and encompassed present day Pebble Beach, California.

== History ==
Fabián Barreto, a Mexican who came to Monterey in 1827 married María del Carmen Garcia Barreto Madariaga in 1833. Barreto received the one square league grant in 1836, but died in 1841. Barreto was "killed by a beam," [Schwald] presumably while building a house. His widow, Maria, married Juan Madariaga in 1844. Madariaga Adobe on Abrego Street in Monterey is named after his family. Juan Madariaga's mother was also named "Maria Madariaga" and the two Marias (and there were more) are often confused in local lore. Maria, the wife of Juan, sold the Rancho Pescadero before she married into the Madariaga family, so it never did belong to the Madariaga's. Maria - the Ghost Lady - most likely could not pay the taxes on the land, and was forced to sell it. David Jacks acquired the property through the Romies. Maria also likely did not understand what part of her holdings that she was selling, as title documents were often not available, which may account for the double-sale. The sudden death of the ill-fated Fabian Barreto, second husband of Maria, resulted in the passing of the land to John Romie and then to David Jacks. (a more complete description of this transaction history (with date discrepancies) can be found on a website dealing with the Hart Mansion - hartmansion.com.)

In 1846 (?) Maria Madariaga sold Rancho Pescadero to John Romie. John Frederick Romie and his wife, Maria A. Frohn (1801–1886), came from Hamburg, Germany to Mexico in 1835. In 1841 they came to Monterey where Romie operated a tailoring business. After the discovery of gold, Romie went to the mines, and died at Placerville in 1850. His widow sold Rancho Pescadero to John C. Gore in 1852.

In 1860 [the year she died?] María Madariaga re-sold the land to David Jacks, who owned the adjoining Rancho Aguajito to the east. David Jacks married Maria Cristina Soledad Romie (1835-), the daughter of J. F. and Maria A. Frohn Romie in 1861.

With the cession of California to the United States following the Mexican-American War, the 1848 Treaty of Guadalupe Hidalgo provided that the land grants would be honored. As required by the Land Act of 1851, a claim for Rancho Pescadero was filed by John C. Gore with the Public Land Commission in 1853, but the grant was patented to David Jacks in 1868.

Litigation over the Rancho Pescadero double deed began in 1860. David Jacks sold the rancho to the Pacific Improvement Company in 1880. When Gore died in 1887, he willed the rancho and its troubles to his son, John C. Gore, Jr. The US Supreme Court dismissed the case in 1905.
