= Califa, California =

Califa
- Former settlement
- Location in California
- Coordinates: 37°05′05″N 120°12′29″W
- Country: United States
- State: California
- County: Madera
- Elevation: 249 ft (76 m)

Califa is a former settlement in Madera County, California, United States. It was located on the Southern Pacific Railroad, 1 mile (1.6 km) northwest of Fairmead, at an elevation of 249 feet (76 m). Califa still appeared on maps as of 1918.

Quadrangle maps from the US Geological Survey show the existence of a depot or station stop along the Southern Pacific tracks at this location as late as 1948, on the Berenda 7.5' 1:24000 quadrangle chart. By the time of the 1961 edition of the same chart, US 99 had been widened, with a freeway interchange connection with State Route 152, and the Califa station had been removed from the map. ( BERENDA, CA HISTORICAL MAP GEOPDF 7.5X7.5 GRID 24000-SCALE 1948 ) ( BERENDA, CA HISTORICAL MAP GEOPDF 7.5X7.5 GRID 24000-SCALE 1961 )

A post office operated at Califa from 1912 to 1915.
