= California State Route 152 =

East-west highway in central California

State Route 152
- SR 152 highlighted in red

Route information
- Maintained by Caltrans
- Length: 104.419 mi (168.046 km) (plus about 1.5 mi (2.5 km) on US 101)
- History: State highway in 1916; SR 152 in 1934
- Tourist routes: Pacheco Pass Road between the Santa Clara–Merced county line and I-5 near Santa Nella
- Restrictions: No tractor-trailer combinations over 45 feet (14 m) in length through Hecker Pass

Major junctions
- West end: SR 1 in Watsonville
- US 101 in Gilroy; SR 156 near Hollister; SR 33 from near Los Banos to Dos Palos Y; I-5 near Los Banos; SR 165 in Los Banos; SR 59 near El Nido
- East end: SR 99 near Chowchilla

Location
- Country: United States
- State: California
- Counties: Santa Cruz, Santa Clara, Merced, Madera

Highway system
- State highways in California; Interstate; US; State; Scenic; History; Pre‑1964; Unconstructed; Deleted; Freeways
← SR 151	→ SR 153

State Route 152 (SR 152) is a state highway that runs from east to west near the middle of the U.S. state of California from State Route 1 in Watsonville to State Route 99 southeast of Merced. Its western portion (which is also known as Pacheco Pass Road and Pacheco Pass Highway) provides access to and from Interstate 5 toward Southern California for motorists in or near Gilroy and San Jose.

== Route description ==
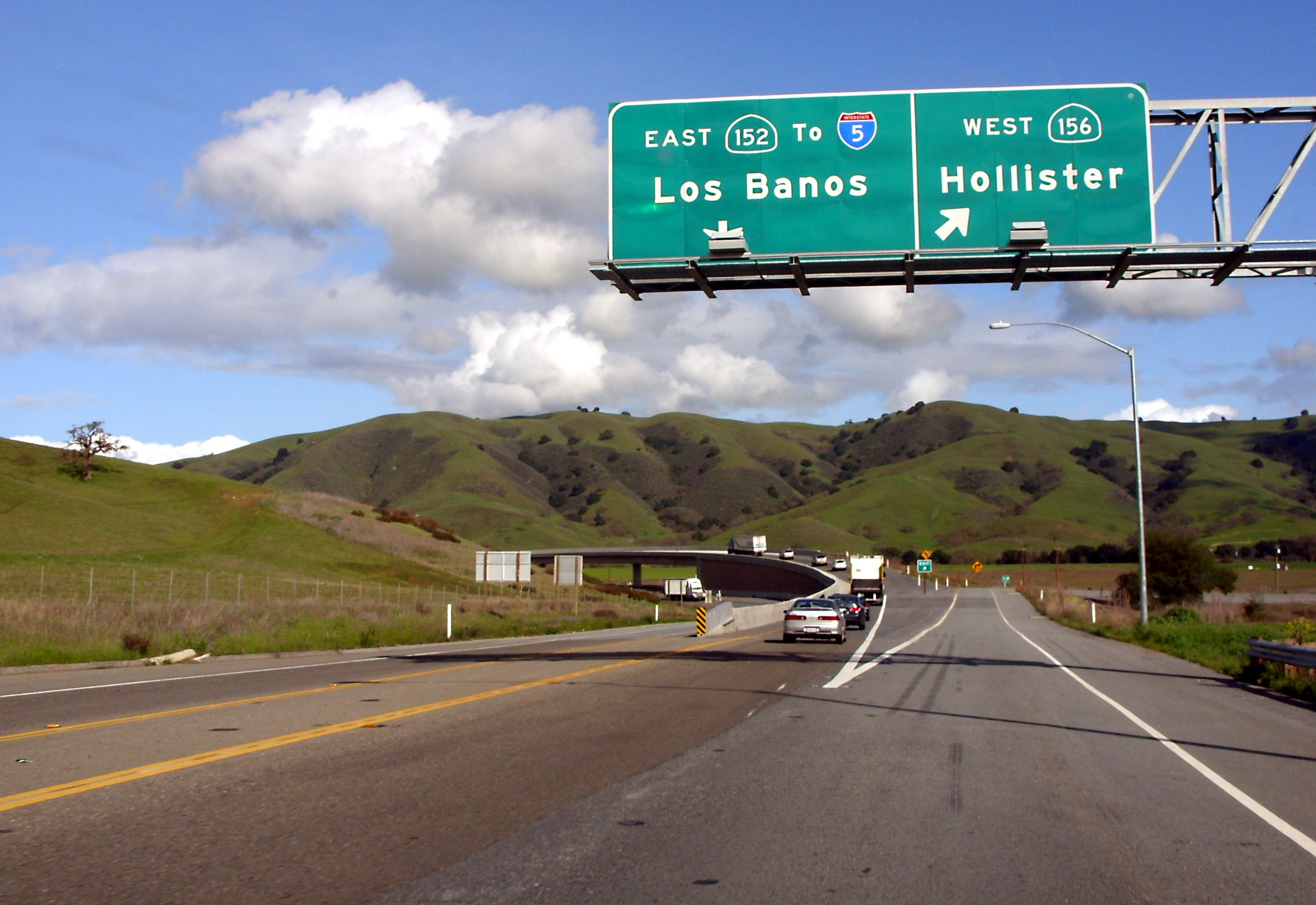
Eastbound traffic and signs on SR 152 at its interchange with Route 156.

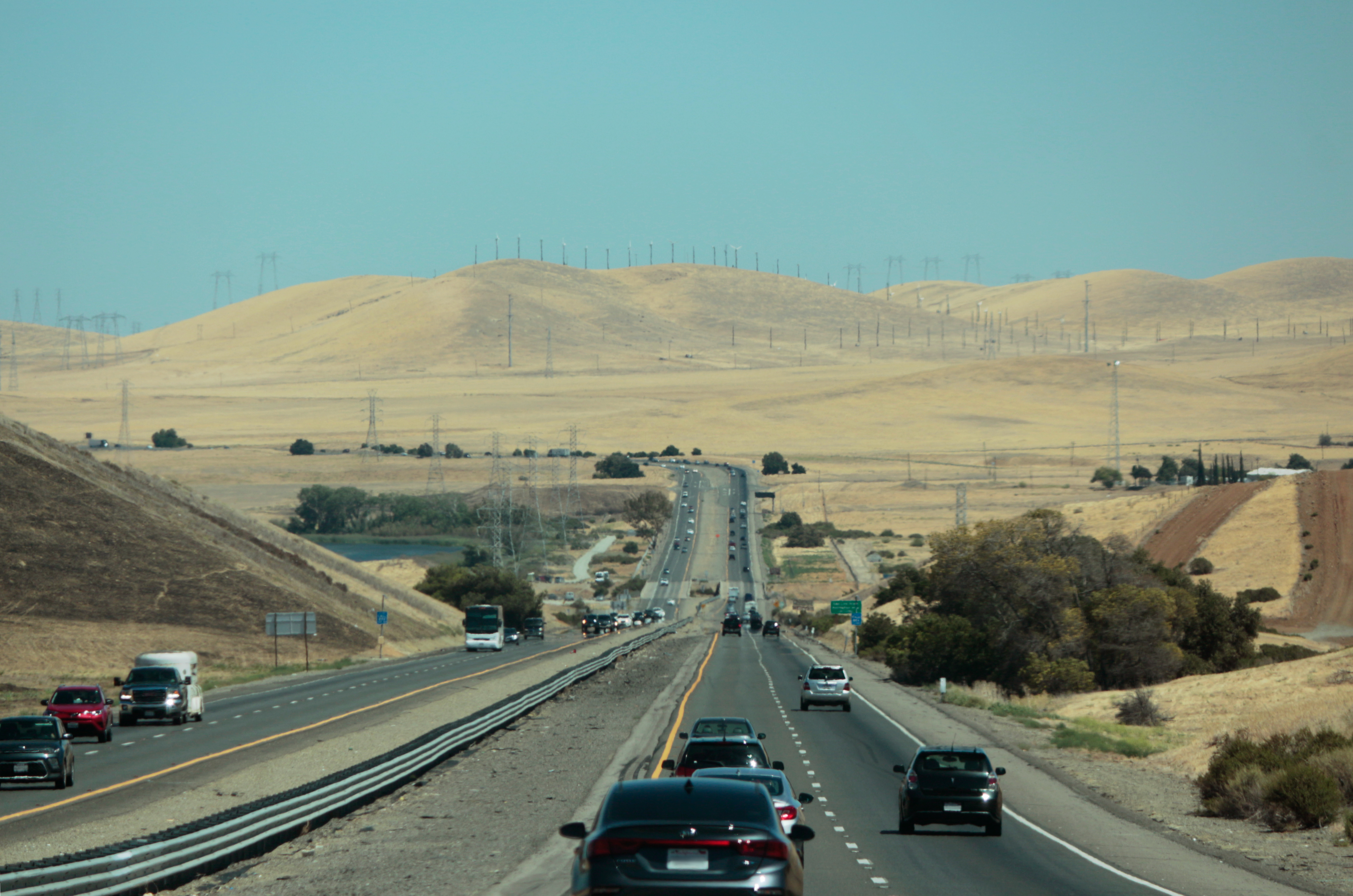
SR 152 as it crosses O'Neill Forebay, viewed while traveling east

Route 152 is defined in section 452, subsection (a) of the California Streets and Highways Code:

Route 152 is from:
(a) Route 1 near Watsonville via Hecker Pass to Route 101 in Gilroy.
(b) Route 101 near Gilroy to Route 65 near Sharon via Pacheco Pass.

Route 152 was never fully constructed to extend east to near Sharon as it is defined, as was Route 65's proposed segment through that area. In addition, the definition omits the concurrency with Route 101 instead of duplicating that segment in the other route's definition in the code. Furthermore, subdivision (b) permits the state to relinquish control of the portion of Route 152 located within Watsonville to the city.

Route 152 begins near Route 1 as a series of local streets that run through downtown Watsonville: East Lake Avenue carries it to the intersection of Casserly Road. This point marks the start of a winding two-lane highway that crosses the Santa Cruz Mountains through Hecker Pass to reach Gilroy. In Gilroy, it is again carried on a series of local streets, then overlapped onto U.S. Route 101 for a small stretch before it separates again a short distance to the south and returns to heading east/west on more local streets in Gilroy.

After exiting the large commercial developments near U.S. 101, Route 152 consists of a single lane in each direction, with narrow shoulders, rain ditches on either side of the road, no center dividers, and posted speed limit of 55 mph (89 km/h), making it prone to head-on collisions. Headlights are required at all times along this portion. This segment is a significant bottleneck for traffic traveling along Route 152 between the San Francisco Bay Area and the Central Valley. Upon reaching Route 156 near Hollister, the road expands to two lanes in each direction, and climbs and curves along the valley of Pacheco Creek into the mountains of the Diablo Range, crossing them through the Pacheco Pass into the San Joaquin Valley.

SR 152 is one of the three major routes that cross the Diablo Range after Interstate 580 and State Route 46. Pacheco Pass is higher than Altamont Pass to the north, but lower than Polonio Pass to the south.

Route 152 continues as a four-lane divided expressway, descending along the northern and eastern shore of the massive San Luis Reservoir. The route passes in between the San Luis Dam and the O'Neill Forebay. The route continues east and passes a large Path 15 substation and then meets Interstate 5 as an expressway. It becomes a speed-limited city street, Pacheco Blvd., while passing through Los Banos. It then returns to an expressway until its eastern terminus at Route 99. Here, eastbound 152 traffic merges into southbound 99 a few miles northwest of the city of Madera, and approximately 25 miles (40 km) northwest of Fresno. Motorists wishing to travel north on Route 99 are advised to take Route 233 north through Chowchilla to connect to northbound 99. Another possible northbound route exists by exiting Route 152 at State Route 59, and proceeding directly north to the city of Merced, where Route 59 meets Route 99.

The landmarks located on Route 152 include the Pacheco Pass, the Gilroy Gardens, the San Luis Reservoir, the Casa de Fruta and the Merry Cherries.

SR 152 is part of the California Freeway and Expressway System, and east of US 101 is part of the National Highway System, a network of highways that are considered essential to the country's economy, defense, and mobility by the Federal Highway Administration. SR 152 is eligible for the State Scenic Highway System, and from the Merced–Santa Clara county line to I-5 is officially designated as a scenic highway by the California Department of Transportation, meaning that it is a substantial section of highway passing through a "memorable landscape" with no "visual intrusions", where the potential designation has gained popular favor with the community.

== History ==
- Highway 152 Tree Row
- U.S. National Register of Historic Places
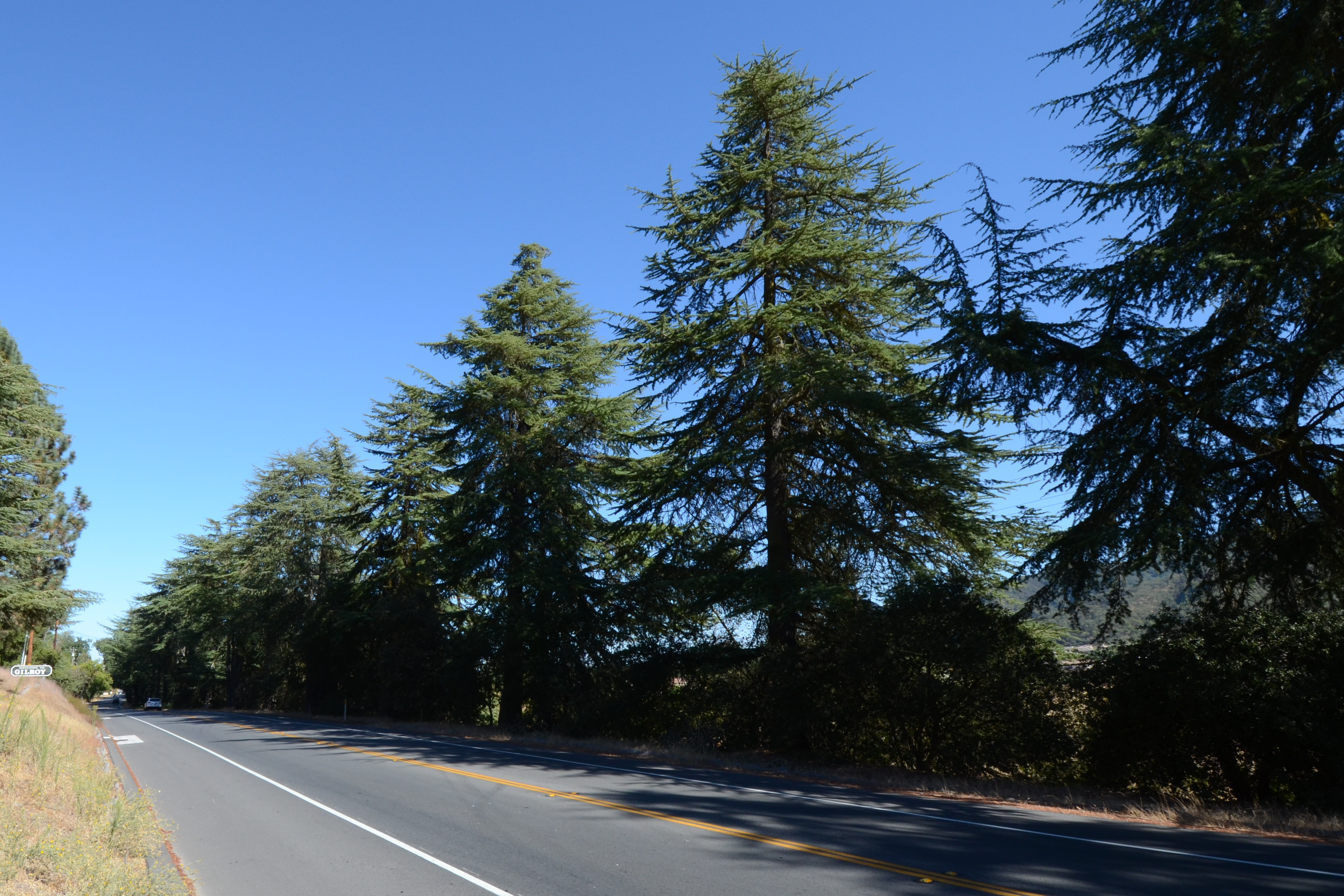
- Nearest city: Gilroy, California
- Built: 1930-1931
- NRHP reference No.: 07000635
- Added to NRHP: July 3, 2007

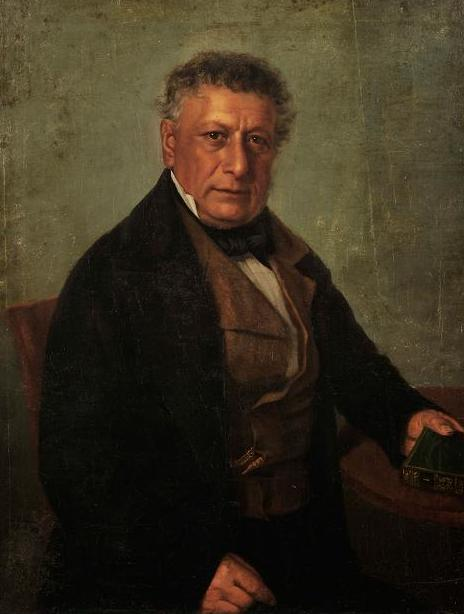
Pacheco Pass is named after Don Francisco Pérez Pacheco, a noted Californio ranchero whose lands were situated on the pass.

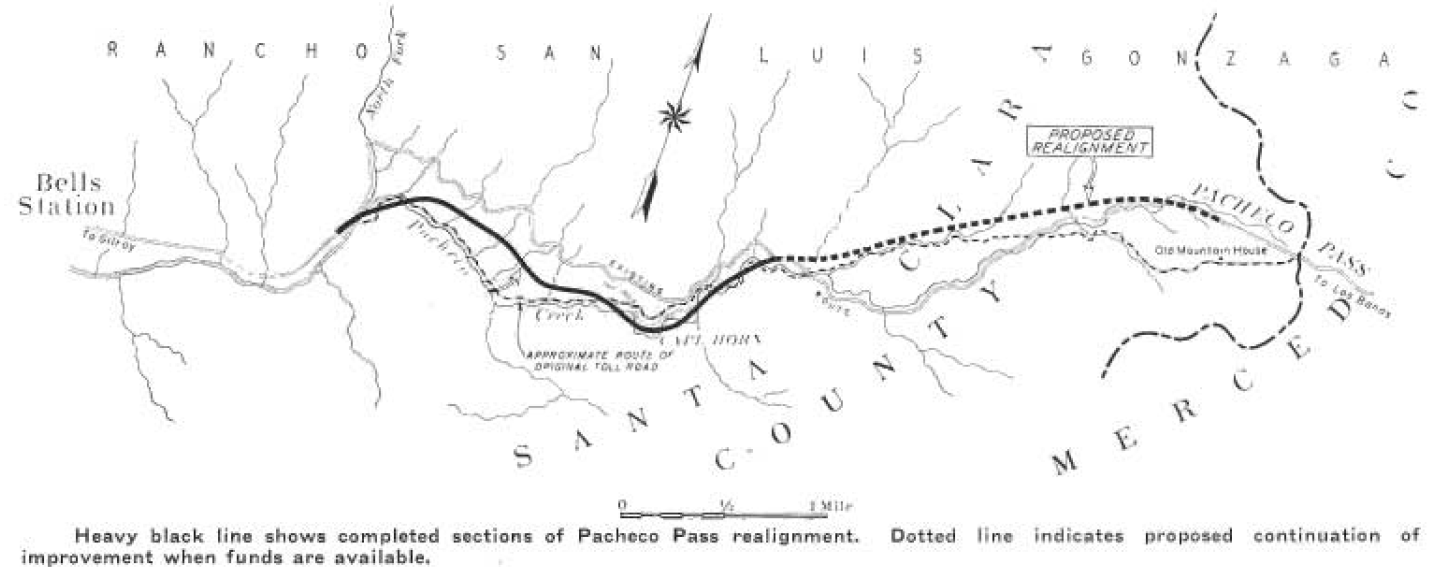
1939 map of Route 152 alignments between Bell Station and Pacheco Pass.

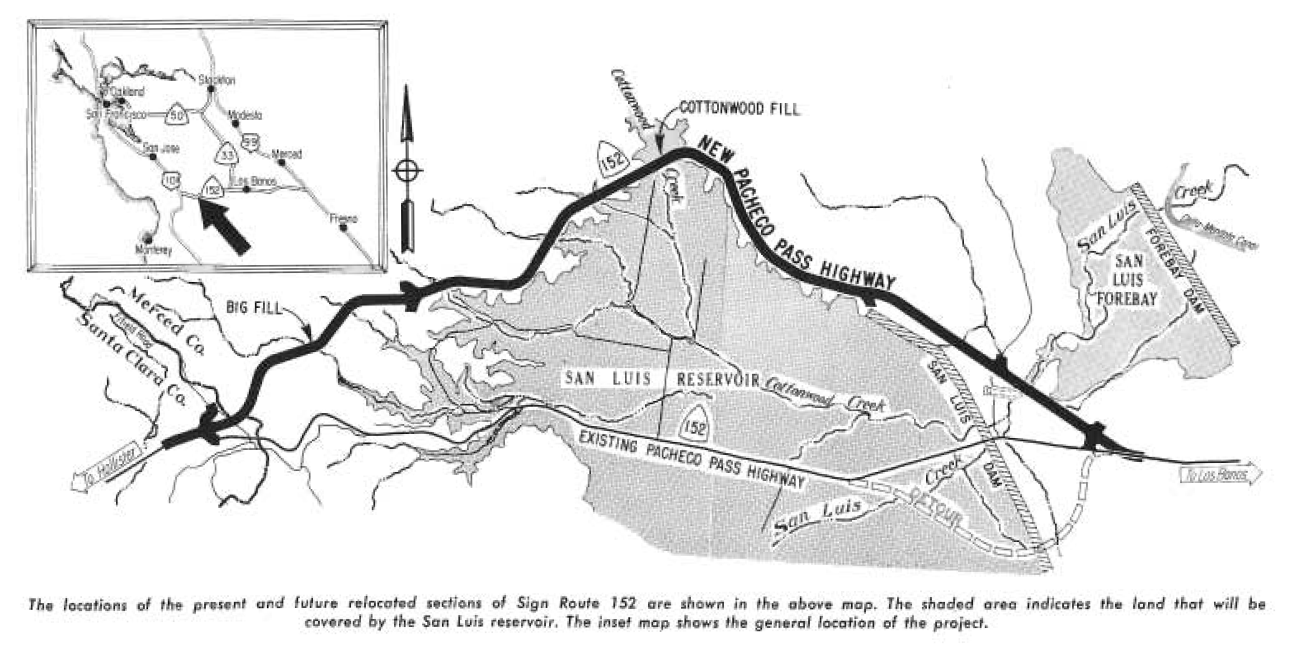
1963 map of Route 152 alignments at San Luis Reservoir.

The road became popular as a route east during the California Gold Rush. The Butterfield Overland Mail ran along this route from 1858 to 1861. A portion of Route 152 from Bell Station to Pacheco Pass was a toll road from 1857 until 1878. In that year, Merced County and Santa Clara County purchased the toll road and replaced it with a new road built as a public highway, part of which is now a segment of Whiskey Flat Trail in Pacheco State Park. In 1915, the road became part of the state highway system, and in 1923, the state completed the third road through the pass. Historic references say the portion of the route west of SR 33 was named Legislative Route 32 before being designated State Route 152.

The 1923 state route over the pass had numerous curves and steep grades. In 1934, 3.3 miles of the road eastward from the summit was realigned and widened. In 1939, a realignment of 2.6 miles of highway was completed eastward from the Pacheco Reservoir area (starting about a mile east of Bell Station). In 1950, the first four-lane expressway segment was constructed from the 1939 alignment to near the Merced County line, a distance of 3.26 miles. The 1934 alignment is now Dinosaur Point Road, while the 1939 and 1950 alignments continue to be in use today as part of SR 152.

In 1963-1965, a new 12-mile four-lane expressway, with climbing lanes for trucks, was built from the Merced County line eastward, to bypass the San Luis Reservoir which was then under construction. A three-mile stretch of the bypassed road continues to be in use as Dinosaur Point Road, providing access to a boat launch ramp at the reservoir.

Between 1982 and 1992, the road was widened in two phases from two to four lanes, with some realignments, on a 10.5-mile segment from the four-lane section completed in 1950 to just east of the junction with California State Route 156. The first phase, from the 1950 segment west to Bell Station, was completed in 1984. The second phase, from Bell Station to Route 156, was constructed from 1990 to 1992, with an interchange built at Casa de Fruta. In 2008, a T-junction and stop sign at the intersection with Route 156 on the remaining two-lane section of the highway west of Casa de Fruta was replaced with a flyover, greatly easing congestion there.

A segment of Route 152 west of Gilroy, between the Uvas Creek Bridge and Santa Teresa Blvd, was added to the National Register of Historic Places in 2007. This segment of the road, serving as a western gateway into Gilroy, is lined with deodar cedar trees that were planted on consecutive Arbor Days in 1930 and 1931.

== Major intersections ==
Except where prefixed with a letter, postmiles were measured on the road as it was in 1964, based on the alignment that existed at the time, and do not necessarily reflect current mileage. Postmile prefixes include: R reflecting a realignment in the route since then, M indicating a second realignment, L referring to an overlap due to a correction or change, and T indicating postmiles classified as temporary. Segments that remain unconstructed or have been relinquished to local control may be omitted. The numbers reset at county lines; the start and end postmiles in each county are given in the county column.

County	Location	Postmile	Destinations	Notes
Santa Cruz; SCR T0.31-8.29	Watsonville	T0.31	SR 1 north – Santa Cruz	Interchange; westbound exit and eastbound entrance; west end of SR 152; SR 1 south exit 426
Santa Cruz; SCR T0.31-8.29	Watsonville	T0.67	Green Valley Road (to SR 1 south) – Monterey, Fairgrounds, Pinto Lake	
Santa Cruz; SCR T0.31-8.29	Watsonville	T2.50	Freedom Boulevard – Freedom	
Santa Cruz; SCR T0.31-8.29	Watsonville	T2.929L– T2.929R	West Beach Street, Main Street to SR 129 – Salinas, Monterey	West end of one-way pair where eastbound traffic heads onto East Beach Street then Lincoln Street, and westbound traffic joins from East Lake Avenue
Santa Cruz; SCR T0.31-8.29	Watsonville	0.26– 0.38	Lincoln Street	East end of one-way pair where westbound traffic stays on East Lake Avenue, and eastbound traffic joins from Lincoln Street
Santa Cruz; SCR T0.31-8.29	Interlaken	R1.99	Holohan Road, College Road – Freedom, Pinto Lake, Santa Cruz	
Santa Cruz; SCR T0.31-8.29	Interlaken	3.69	Carlton Road, Casserly Road	Trucks over 45 feet (14 m) in length are instructed to instead use Carlton Road to SR 129
Santa Cruz–Santa Clara county line	Llagas-Uvas	8.29 0.00	Hecker Pass	
Santa Clara; SCL 0.00-R35.16	Llagas-Uvas	5.03	CR G8 (Watsonville Road) – Morgan Hill, San Jose	Southern terminus of CR G8
Santa Clara; SCL 0.00-R35.16	Gilroy	7.93	Santa Teresa Boulevard	Serves Gavilan College
Santa Clara; SCL 0.00-R35.16	Gilroy	M9.43	US 101 Bus. south (Monterey Street)	West end of US 101 Bus. overlap
Santa Clara; SCL 0.00-R35.16	Gilroy	M9.78	US 101 Bus. north (Monterey Street) / Welburn Avenue	East end of US 101 Bus. overlap
Santa Clara; SCL 0.00-R35.16	Gilroy	M10.28 R7.53 (Note: Indicates that the postmile represents the distance along US 101 rather than SR 152.)	US 101 north (South Valley Freeway) / CR G9 (Leavesley Road) – San Jose	Interchange; west end of US 101 overlap; western terminus of CR G9; US 101 south exit 357; serves Saint Louise Regional Hospital (via San Ysidro Avenue); trucks over 7 tons prohibited on CR G9
Santa Clara; SCL 0.00-R35.16	Gilroy	M10.28 R7.53	West end of freeway on US 101	
Santa Clara; SCL 0.00-R35.16	Gilroy	R6.08 R9.91	East end of freeway on US 101	
Santa Clara; SCL 0.00-R35.16	Gilroy	R6.08 R9.91	US 101 south (South Valley Freeway) / 10th Street – Los Angeles	Interchange; east end of US 101 overlap; US 101 north exit 356
Santa Clara; SCL 0.00-R35.16		12.81	CR G9 (Ferguson Road)	Eastern terminus of CR G9; trucks over 7 tons prohibited
Santa Clara; SCL 0.00-R35.16		14.89	CR G7 (Bloomfield Avenue)	Eastern terminus of CR G7
Santa Clara; SCL 0.00-R35.16		R21.98	SR 156 west – Hollister	Interchange; eastern terminus of SR 156; no westbound entrance
Santa Clara; SCL 0.00-R35.16		R23.41	Casa de Fruta Parkway	Interchange; serves Casa de Fruta
Santa Clara; SCL 0.00-R35.16	Pacheco Pass	R34.87	Dinosaur Point Road – Pacheco State Park, San Luis Reservoir	
Merced; MER R0.00-R40.95		11.27	SR 33 north to I-5 north – Santa Nella, Gustine	Interchange; west end of SR 33 overlap; signed as exit 60
Merced; MER R0.00-R40.95		13.85	I-5 (West Side Freeway) – Sacramento, San Francisco, Los Angeles	Interchange; I-5 exits 403A-B
Merced; MER R0.00-R40.95	Los Banos	19.62	West I Street	Serves Sutter Health – Memorial Hospital Los Banos
Merced; MER R0.00-R40.95	Los Banos	21.27	SR 165 (Mercey Springs Road) to I-5 south – Turlock	
Merced; MER R0.00-R40.95	Dos Palos Y	R32.37	SR 33 south (Elgin Avenue) – Dos Palos, Mendota	Interchange; east end of SR 33 overlap
Merced–Madera county line		R40.77– R0.06	SR 59 north – Merced	Interchange; southern terminus of SR 59
Madera; MAD R0.00-15.63		10.80	SR 233 north (Robertson Boulevard) to SR 99 north – Chowchilla	Interchange; southern terminus of SR 233
Madera; MAD R0.00-15.63	Califa	15.63	SR 99 south – Madera, Fresno	Interchange; eastbound exit and westbound entrance; east end of SR 152; former US 99; SR 99 exit 166
1.000 mi = 1.609 km; 1.000 km = 0.621 mi: Concurrency terminus; Incomplete access
