= Pacheco State Park =

Park in California, United States

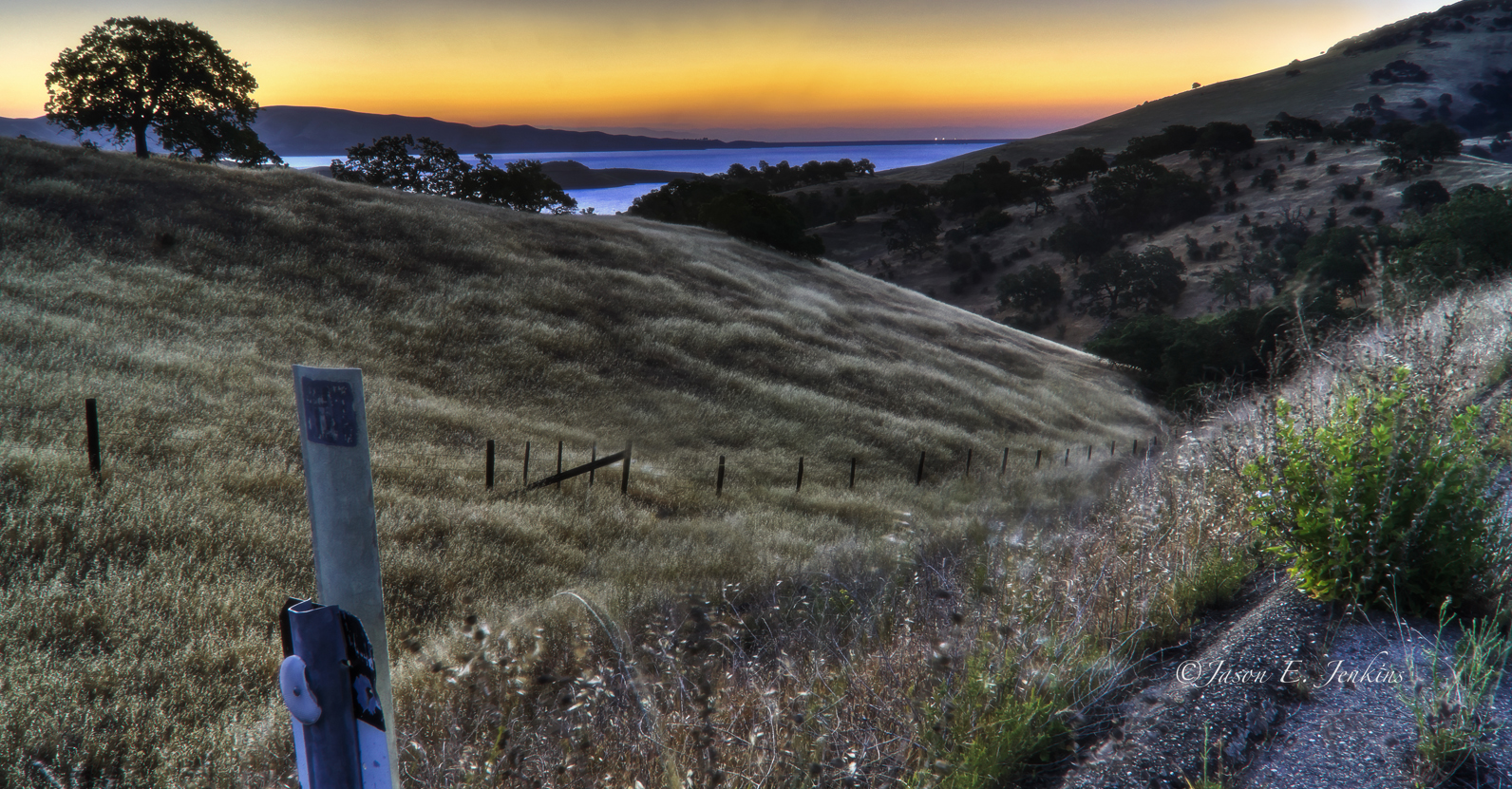
- Dinosaur Point in Pacheco State Park

- Location within California Location within the United States
- Location: San Benito County / Merced County / Santa Clara County, California
- Nearest city: Hollister
- Coordinates: 37°2′39″N 121°11′54″W
- Area: 6,890 acres (2,790 ha)
- Established: 1997
- Governing body: California Department of Parks & Recreation
- Website: Official website

Pacheco State Park is a California State Park to the south of Pacheco Pass in the Diablo Range, located mostly in western Merced County, California but extending into southeastern Santa Clara County and near Hollister in San Benito County. Located 24 miles (39 km) west of Los Banos, California and 20 miles (32 km) east of Gilroy, the park entrance is on Dinosaur Point Road, a short distance from California State Route 152 near Pacheco Pass. The park contains 6,890 acres (2,790 ha), though only the western 2,600 acres (1,100 ha) to the west are open to the public. The eastern two-thirds of the park are closed due to an underdeveloped trail system and safety concerns over the numerous wind turbines that are located in the Gonzaga Wind Farm that occupies the area. In 2018, it was announced that the 1980s-era turbines would be replaced with more efficient models, which would increase power production capacity from the original 16.5 megawatts (MW) to as much as 80 MW.

== History ==
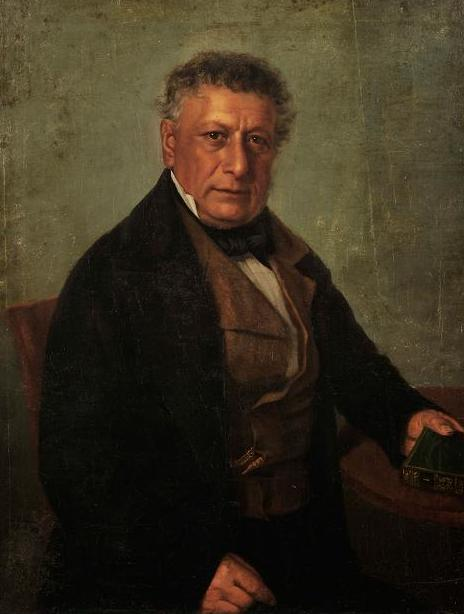
Pacheco State Park is named after Don Francisco Pérez Pacheco, a noted Californio ranchero who owned the parklands in the 1800s.

The park is named after Californio ranchero Don Francisco Pérez Pacheco and was created as the last piece of the Rancho San Luis Gonzaga in 1997, five years after it was bequeathed to the state by Paula M. Fatjó. Fatjó was the great-great granddaughter of Don Francisco Pérez Pacheco, for whom both the park and the nearby Pacheco Pass are named. The rancho had been in the Pacheco family since 1843, serving as a horse and cattle ranch.

== Recreation ==
The park now has about 28 miles (45 km) of trails for hiking, horseback riding and mountain biking. Dogs are not allowed on the trails. There are no camping facilities inside the park, nor are there any sources of potable water for human consumption. (Note: The closest campgrounds are at the nearby San Luis State Recreation Area.)

The park is known for its vistas of the Central Valley to the East and the Santa Clara Valley to the West. In Spring, there are impressive displays of colorful wildflowers. Historic features in the park include an old line shack used by a cattle company in the 1800s, part of the old Butterfield Stage route and the ruins of the original Pacheco adobe.

Wildlife in the park include tule elk, deer, bobcat, coyote, fox, several varieties of hawks, golden eagles and many smaller animals. Park land is still used for cattle grazing during the winter and spring.

== Power production ==
A large part of the park that is closed to the public is devoted to wind turbines that were installed in the 1980s and designed to produce 16.5 megawatts (MW) of electric power. Quinbrook Infrastructure Partners announced that its Quinbrook Low Carbon Power Fund had won a long-term lease to upgrade the Gonzaga Wind Farm in Pacheco State Park. Scout Clean Energy, an operating company owned by Quinbrook, will replace the existing turbines with more modern designs that are designed to produce up to 80 MW of power.
