= California State Route 59 =

Highway in California

State Route 59

- SR 59 highlighted in red

Route information
- Maintained by Caltrans
- Length: 33.76 mi (54.33 km)

Major junctions
- South end: SR 152 near El Nido
- SR 99 / SR 140 in Merced
- North end: CR J16 / CR J59 in Snelling

Location
- Country: United States
- State: California
- Counties: Merced

Highway system
- State highways in California; Interstate; US; State; Scenic; History; Pre‑1964; Unconstructed; Deleted; Freeways
← SR 58	→ SR 60

State Route 59 (SR 59) is a state highway in the U.S. state of California located entirely in Merced County. It connects State Route 152 near El Nido to the city of Merced and beyond, ending abruptly at the intersection of County Routes J59 and J16 in Snelling.

== Route description ==
Route 59 is defined in section 359 of the California Streets and Highways Code. The definition omits the concurrency with Route 99 instead of duplicating that segment in the other route's definition in the code:

Route 59 is from:
(a) Route 152 northerly to Route 99 near Merced.
(b) Route 99 near Merced to Snelling.

SR 59 begins at SR 152 as Los Banos Highway. The highway travels north through the town of El Nido until entering the city of Merced, where it runs concurrently with the SR 99 freeway and with SR 140. SR 59 leaves the concurrency on the west side of Merced and travels north as the Snelling Highway. The highway winds up the Sierra Nevada foothills until it passes through Snelling, where it ends at its intersection with County Routes J59 and J16.

SR 59 is part of the California Freeway and Expressway System, but except for a portion in Merced is not part of the National Highway System, a network of highways that are considered essential to the country's economy, defense, and mobility by the Federal Highway Administration.

== Future ==
In January 2010, the Tuolumne County Board of Supervisors made a formal request to the state to add the entire length of County Route J59 as a northerly extension of State Route 59 from its terminus in Snelling, Merced County, to the intersection of State Routes 108 and 120 in Tuolumne County.

On February 20, 2026, state senator Marie Alvarado-Gil introduced Senate Bill 1334. Co-written by state assembly members Juan Alanis and David Tangipa, if signed into law it would require the California Transportation Commission and the counties of Merced, Stanislaus, and Tuolumne to come to an agreement to allow the state to acquire CR J59 by December 31, 2030. The modified definition of State Route 59, with its new northern terminus as "the junction of Routes 108 and 120", would then go into effect on January 1, 2031.

== Major intersections ==
Except where prefixed with a letter, postmiles were measured on the road as it was in 1964, based on the alignment that existed at the time, and do not necessarily reflect current mileage. Postmile prefixes include: R reflecting a realignment in the route since then, M indicating a second realignment, L referring to an overlap due to a correction or change, and T indicating postmiles classified as temporary. Segments that remain unconstructed or have been relinquished to local control may be omitted. The entire route is in Merced County.

Location	Postmile	Destinations	Notes
	0.00	SR 152 – Madera, Los Banos	Interchange; southbound exit and northbound entrance; south end of SR 59
Merced	14.77 14.69 (Note: Indicates that the postmile represents the distance along SR 99 rather than SR 59.)	SR 99 south / SR 140 east / Martin Luther King Jr. Way – Los Angeles, Yosemite	Interchange; south end of SR 99 / SR 140 overlap; SR 99 exit 187B; Martin Luther King Jr. Way serves Dignity Health – Mercy Medical Center Merced
Merced	14.77 14.69	South end of freeway on SR 99	
Merced	15.80 14.78	North end of freeway on SR 99	
Merced	15.80 14.78	SR 99 north / SR 140 west (McSwain Road) / V Street – Sacramento, Gustine	Interchange; north end of SR 99 / SR 140 overlap; SR 99 exit 188; V Street serves Merced Regional Airport
Merced	14.98	V Street, 16th Street south (SR 99 Bus. south)	South end of SR 99 Bus. overlap; former US 99 south
Merced	15.35	16th Street north (SR 99 Bus. north)	North end of SR 99 Bus. overlap; former US 99 north
Merced	16.10	CR J7 (Santa Fe Drive) / West Olive Avenue	Southern terminus of CR J7; West Olive Avenue serves Merced College
	19.00	Bellevue Road – Yosemite Lake	Serves UC Merced
	R28.81	CR J17 (Turlock Road) – Turlock	Eastern terminus of CR J17
Snelling	33.00	CR J16 west (Montgomery Street)	South end of CR J16 overlap
Snelling	33.71	CR J16 east (Merced Falls Road) / CR J59 (La Grange Road) – Merced Falls, Hornitos, La Grange, Sonora	North end of CR J16 overlap; north end of SR 59; southern terminus of CR J59
1.000 mi = 1.609 km; 1.000 km = 0.621 mi: Concurrency terminus
