= Jacks Peak Park =

Park in Monterey County, California, United States

Coordinates: 36.560946°N 121.866789°W

Jacks Peak Park is a county park in Monterey County, California. Its central feature is Jacks Peak, the highest point on the Monterey Peninsula, rising 1,068 feet (325 m) above Monterey and Carmel. The park encompasses 525 acres under control of the Monterey County Parks Department.

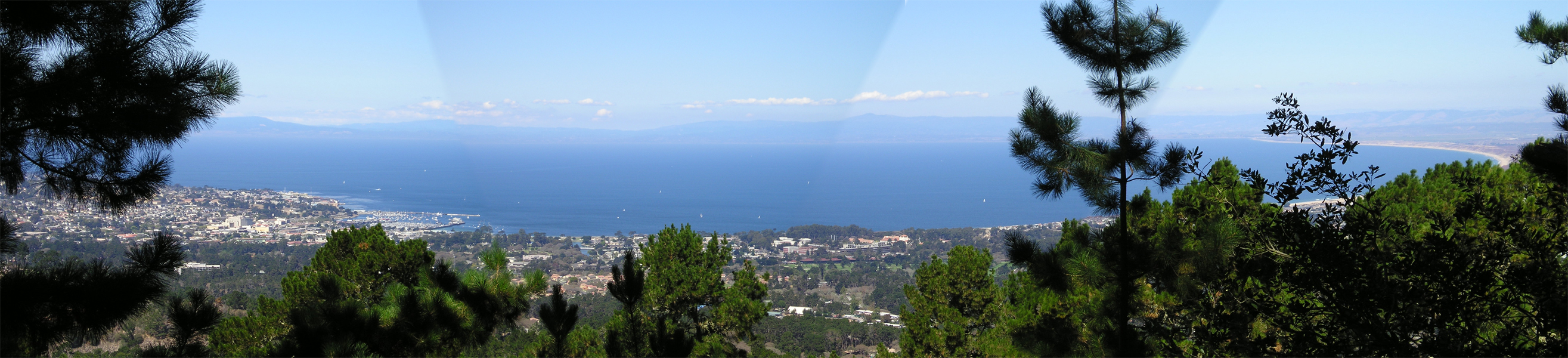
View of Monterey and Monterey Bay from Jacks Peak.

== History ==
The park is part of the Pueblo Lands tract acquired in 1859 by Scottish immigrant David Jacks. The first 55 acres (220,000 m^{2}) that were to become the park were purchased by Talcott and Margaret Pardee Bates in 1964. They sold it to the Nature Conservancy, who eventually sold it to Monterey County. In 1971, the county purchased the remaining acres for the park from Del Monte Properties. The park opened in January, 1977. During the Cenozoic period water levels lowered making Jacks Peak Park an island causing shale and fossils to be commonly found in the area.

== Facilities ==
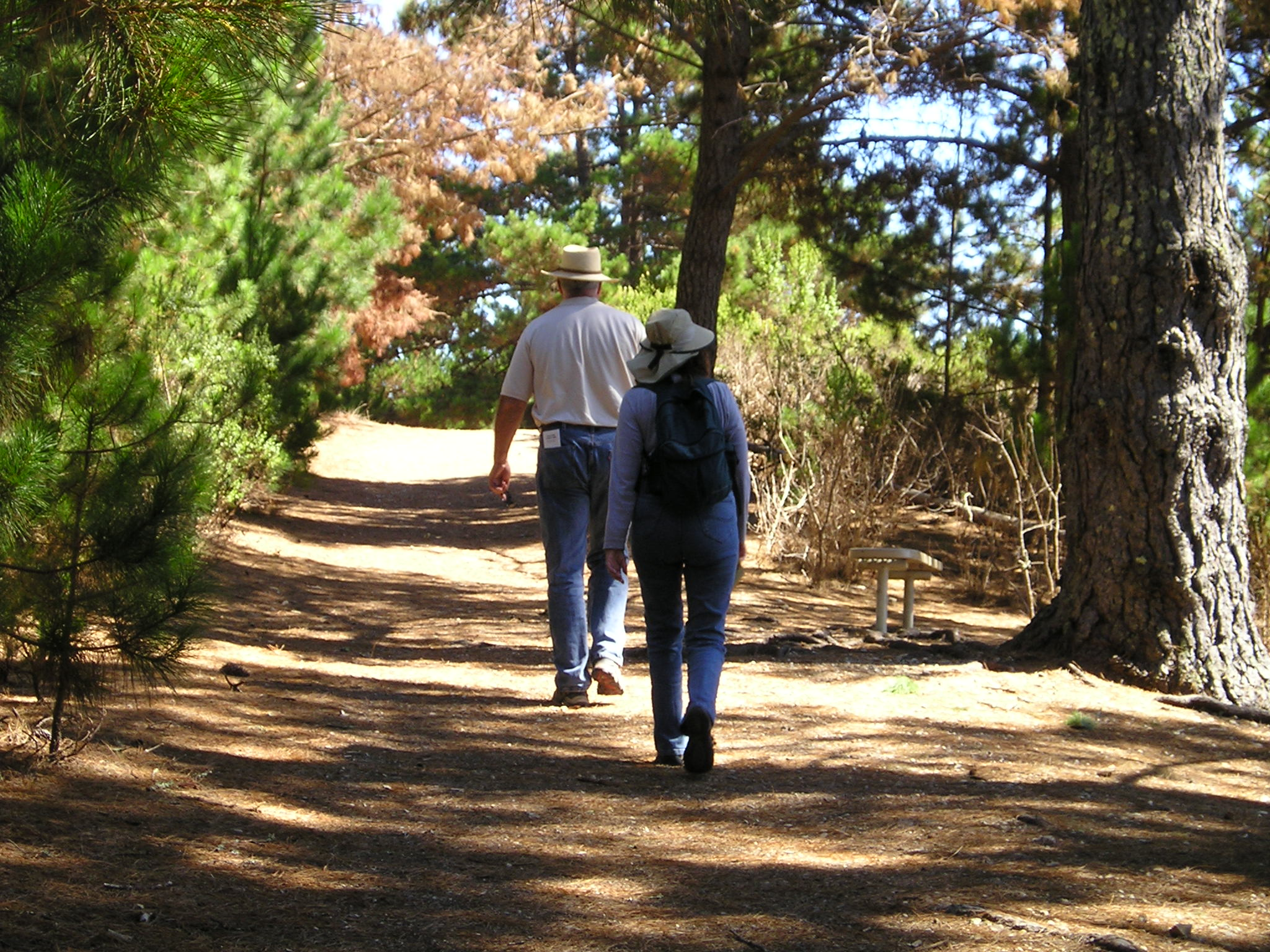
Hiking in Jacks Peak Park

The park allows picnics and day hiking. Several miles of trails, including a self-guided nature trail, wrap around Jacks Peak and through the rest of the park.

== Environment and Monterey pines ==
The park includes one of only three remaining native stands of the Monterey pine. Flora in the park also includes madrone (arbutus menziesii), coastal scrub (including coyote brush (baccharis pilularis), California sagebrush, black sage, and ceanothus), poison oak, and the coast live oak.

== Location ==
Jacks Peak Park is located near the Joyce Stevens Monterey Pine Reserve and is adjacent to Highway 1. Nearby landmarks include All Saints Primary School, the Community Hospital of the Monterey Peninsula, and Pebble Beach Morse Gate.
