= Bell Station, California =

Unincorporated community in California, United States

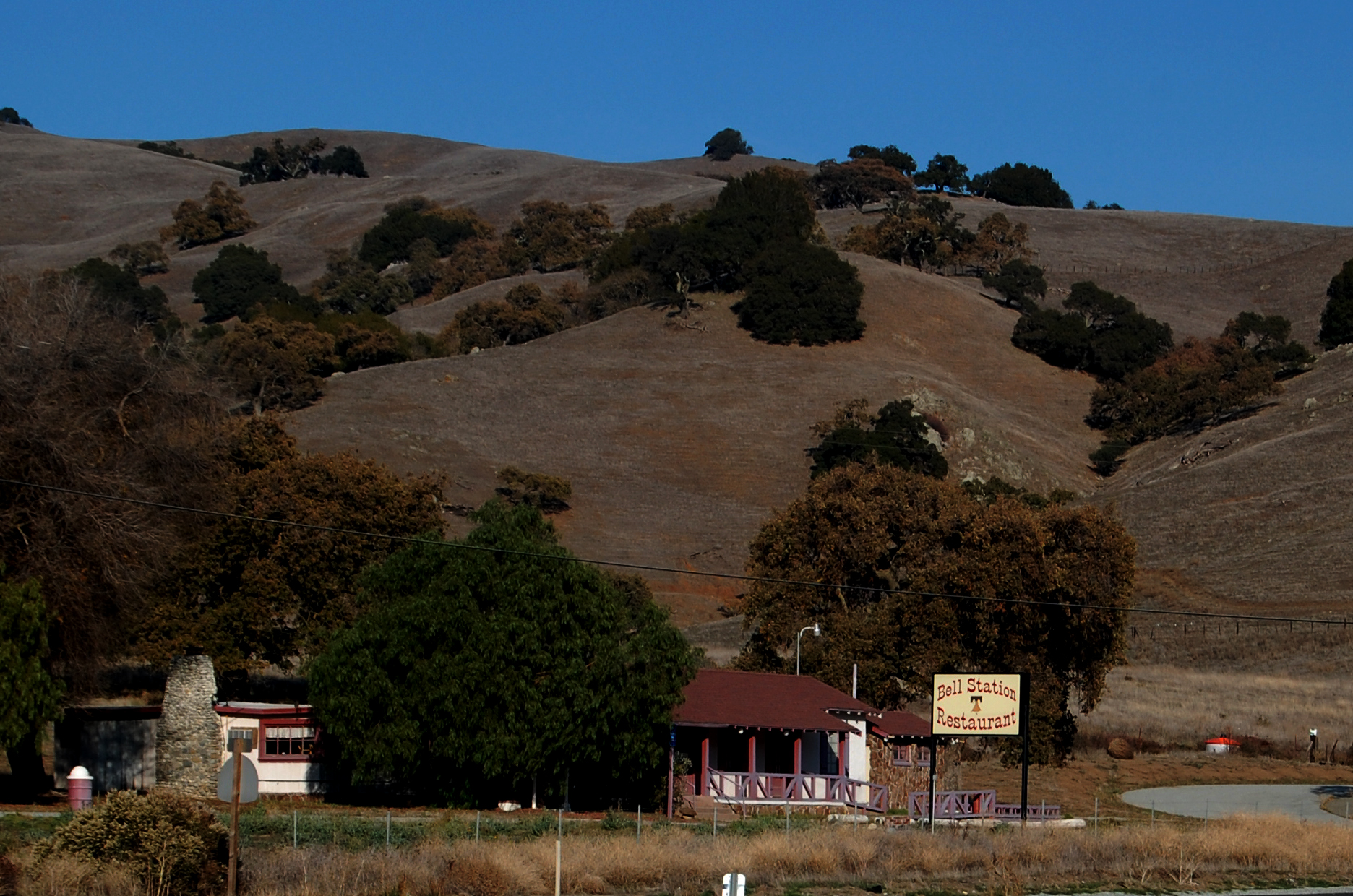
Bell Station Restaurant, shown c. 2007.

Bell Station (or Bell's Station) is an unincorporated community located along State Route 152 between Casa de Fruta and Pacheco Pass near the southeasternmost corner of Santa Clara County, California, United States.

A Department of Transportation (Caltrans) maintenance station once existed in this area. A California Department of Forestry fire station is west of Bell Station along SR152.

The ZIP code is 95020, and the community is served by area codes 408 and 669.

== History ==
The location was originally called Hollenbeck's Station, (possibly after the namesake of the Sunnyvale street of the same name). It was renamed for Lafayette F. Bell, who had built a saloon at the entrance to a road over Pacheco Pass. Later, Bell bought the road over Pacheco Pass from Andrew Firebaugh and began charging a toll for passage. A Bell's Station Post Office was established by the U.S. Post Office Department, and was in use from 1873 to 1914.

Some references say the locale was a stop on the Butterfield Overland Mail stagecoach route. The stagecoach route to San Francisco from the American Midwest was known to have stops every ten miles or so along its length. Hall of Fame baseball player Harry Hooper was born here in 1887.

== Geography ==
Bell Station is an officially defined geographic feature of type locale in the National Geographic Names Database. The feature ID number is 218994. The location also appears on the US Geological Survey 7.5-minute quadrangle "Pacheco Peak, California" and the 1921 "Gilroy Hot Springs, California" 15-minute quadrangle.

The US Geological Survey latitude and longitude for the locale is given as 37°02′12″N 121°18′39″W. The area is about 350 feet above mean sea level (AMSL).

== Other articles ==
- Henry W. Coe State Park

== Sources ==
- The History of Pacheco Pass as retrieved January 19, 2007.
