= Rancho Zanjones =

Land grant in California

Coordinates: 36.550°N 121.490°W

Rancho Zanjones was a 6,714-acre (27.17 km^{2}) Mexican land grant in present day Monterey County, California given in 1839 by Governor pro tem Manuel Jimeno to Gabriel de la Torre. The grant extended along the north bank of the Salinas River east of present day Chualar.

== History ==
Gabriel de la Torre, the Mexican government's chief administrator of Monterey, was granted the one and one half square league Rancho Zanjones in 1839. Juan Malarín acquired Rancho Zanjones.

Juan Malarín (1792–1849), a sea captain from Peru, came to California in 1822, and was made a Lieutenant in the Mexican Navy. He made Monterey his home, and in 1824 he married Maria Josefa Joaquina Estrada, a daughter of José Mariano Estrada, grantee of Rancho Buena Vista. Malarín was grantee of the two square league Rancho Guadalupe y Llanitos de los Correos in 1833, and the two square league Rancho Chualar in 1839. When Malarín died in 1849, his son, Mariano Malarín, took charge of the family estate. In 1859, Mariano Malarín (1827–1895) married Ysidora Pacheco (-1892), a daughter of Francisco Pacheco, owner of Rancho Ausaymas y San Felipe.

With the cession of California to the United States following the Mexican-American War, the 1848 Treaty of Guadalupe Hidalgo provided that the land grants would be honored. As required by the Land Act of 1851, a claim for Rancho Zanjones was filed with the Public Land Commission in 1852, and the grant was patented to Mariano Malarín in 1866.

David Jacks later owned an interest in the rancho and Rancho Chualar.

== See also ==
- Ranchos of California
- List of Ranchos of California
- Zanja
