= Rancho Aguajito =

Mexican land grant in California

Coordinates: 36.580°N 121.880°W

Rancho Aguajito was a 3,323-acre (13.45 km^{2}) Mexican land grant in present-day Monterey County, California given in 1835 by Governor José Figueroa to Gregorio Tapia. The grant was south of Monterey and encompassed Hotel Del Monte, the present-day Naval Postgraduate School, and the Del Monte Golf Course.

== History ==
Gregorio Tapia (1814-) married Maria Martina Vasquez (1814-) in 1830.

With the cession of California to the United States following the Mexican-American War, the 1848 Treaty of Guadalupe Hidalgo provided that the land grants would be honored. As required by the Land Act of 1851, a claim for Rancho Aguajito was filed with the Public Land Commission in 1853, and the grant was patented to Gregorio Tapia in 1868.

David Jacks, owner of the adjoining Rancho Pescadero bought the rancho. David Jacks sold the rancho to the Pacific Improvement Company in 1880.

== See also ==
- Ranchos of California
- List of Ranchos of California
