= Rancho Corral de Tierra (Vasquez) =

Mexican land grant in California

Coordinates: 37.490°N 122.420°W

Rancho Corral de Tierra was a 4,436-acre (17.95 km^{2}) Mexican land grant in present-day coastal western San Mateo County, northern California.

It was given in 1839 by Governor Pro-Tem Manuel Jimeno to José Tiburcio Vásquez. The name means “earthen corral” in Spanish. Jimeno granted Vasquez the smaller southern part of Rancho Corral de Tierra and the larger northern Rancho Corral de Tierra (Palomares) part to Francisco Guerrero y Palomares.

The dividing line between the two grants was the Arroyo de en Medio just south of El Granada. The Vasquez portion extended along the Pacific coast south from El Granada to Pilarcitos Creek, and encompassed what is now the northern section of the city of Half Moon Bay.

== History ==
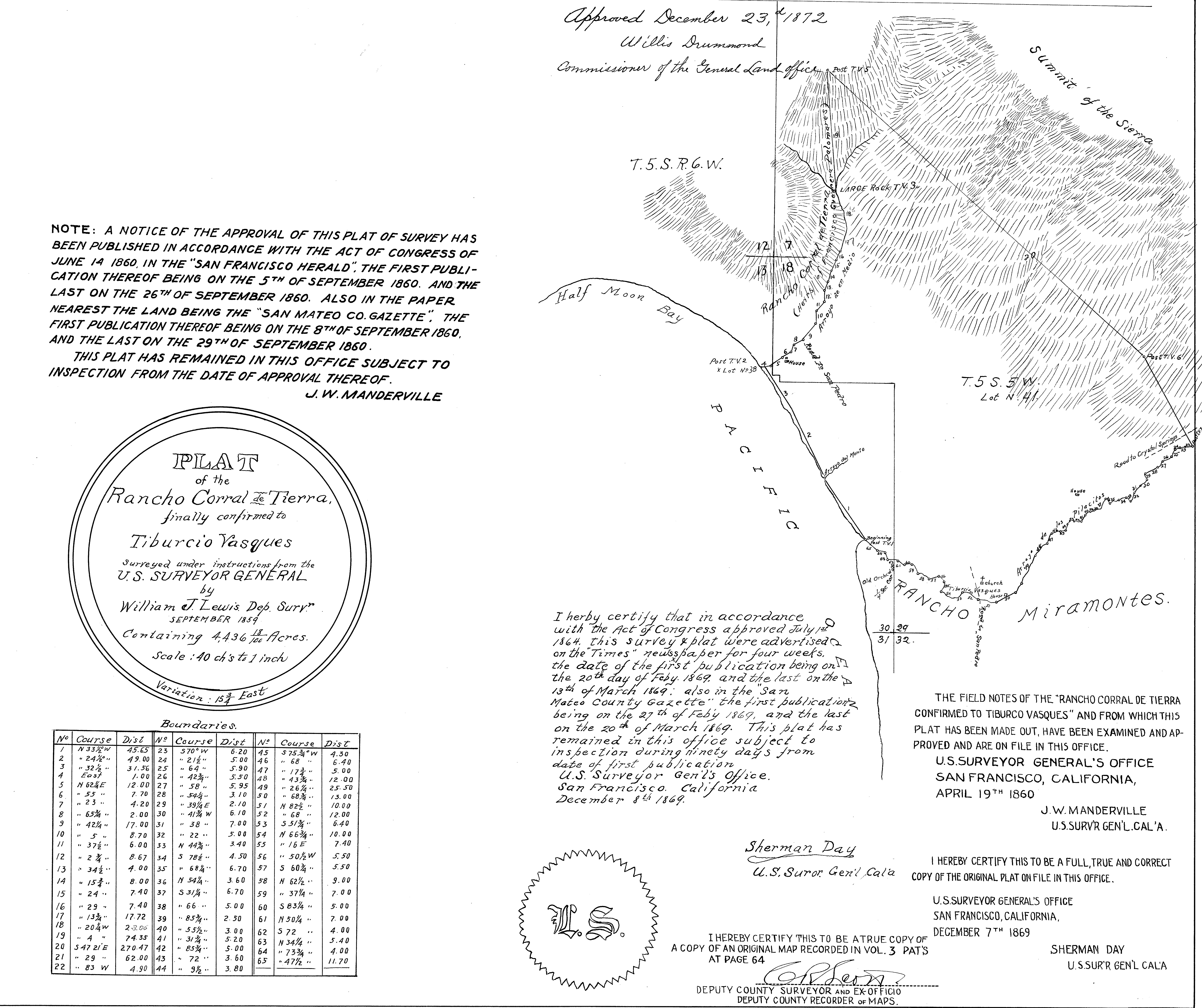
Plat of rancho in 1859

José Tiburcio Vásquez (1795–1862), son of Jose Tiburcio Vásquez and Maria Antonia Bojorquez was born in the Pueblo of San José in Alta California. He served as a soldier at San Francisco Presidio and was administrator and major domo of Mission Dolores in Yerba Buena (present day San Francisco). His brother, José Felipe Vásquez, was the grantee of Rancho Chamisal. The bandit Tiburcio Vásquez was a nephew. He married Maria Alvina Hernandez (1796–) in 1822.

With the cession of California to the United States following the Mexican-American War, the 1848 Treaty of Guadalupe Hidalgo provided that the land grants would be honored. As required by the Land Act of 1851, a claim for Rancho Corral de Tierra was filed with the Public Land Commission in 1853, and the grant was patented to Tiburcio Vasquez in 1873.

In 1862, Vásquez was shot while sitting in a saloon, and his killer never apprehended. Guerrero was murdered in San Francisco in 1851, and the two killings may have been related. Guerrero was scheduled to be a witness in the Santillan land fraud case, which Vasquez also served as a witness. A land grant of three square leagues at the Mission Dolores, was said to have been made in 1846 by Governor Pío Pico to Prudencio Santillan, a priest at the Mission. The Land Commission and the United States District Court confirmed the grant. But on appeal to the US Supreme Court in 1860, the Santillan grant was pronounced a fraud and rejected.
