= Rancho Chamisal =

Mexican land grant in California

Coordinates: 36.610°N 121.730°W

Rancho Chamisal was a 2,737-acre (11.08 km^{2}) Mexican land grant in the Salinas Valley, in present day Monterey County, California given in 1835 by Governor José Castro to Felipe Vasquez. The grant was located east of Monterey and extended along Pilarcitos Canyon, south of the Salinas River (opposite Rancho Nacional). The grant was bounded by Rancho El Toro on the east.

== History ==
Jose Felipe Vasquez (1782–), son of Jose Tiburcio and Maria Antonia Bojorquez, married Maria Nicanor Lugo. His brother, José Tiburcio Vásquez, was the grantee of Rancho Corral de Tierra. The bandit Tiburcio Vásquez was a nephew. Felipe Vasquez was granted the one square league Rancho Chamisal in 1835, and left to his widow Nicanor Lugo, and three children, Manuel, Dionisio, and Pedro Vasquez.

With the cession of California to the United States following the Mexican–American War, the 1848 Treaty of Guadalupe Hidalgo provided that the land grants would be honored. As required by the Land Act of 1851, a claim for Rancho Chamisal was filed with the Public Land Commission in 1853, and the grant was patented to Felipe Vasquez in 1877.

== See also ==
- Ranchos of California
- List of Ranchos of California
