= Rancho Orestimba y Las Garzas =

Mexican land grant in California

Coordinates: 37.340°N 120.980°W

Rancho Orestimba y Las Garzas (Meetingplace and the Herons) was a 26,668-acre (107.92 km^{2}) Mexican land grant in present-day Stanislaus County and Merced County, California given in 1844 by Governor Manuel Micheltorena to Sebastián Núñez. The grant was originally in a part of Tuolumne County that became part of Stanislaus County in 1854, and was located west of the San Joaquin River and south of Rancho Del Puerto, and encompassed present-day Newman. Arroyo Orestimba lay across the northern section of the Rancho Orestimba with Arroyo de las Garzas across the southern end of the Rancho.

== History ==
In 1840 Sebastián Núñez married María Jacinta Pacheco (1813–), daughter of Francisco Pacheco, grantee of Rancho Ausaymas y San Felipe and Rancho San Justo. Núñez was granted the six square league Rancho Orestimba in 1844. The ranch house of Rancho Orestimba y las Garzas, was built above the sycamore grove on Arroyo de Orestimba.

With the cession of California to the United States following the Mexican–American War, the 1848 Treaty of Guadalupe Hidalgo provided that the land grants would be honored. As required by the Land Act of 1851, a claim for Rancho Orestimba was filed with the Public Land Commission in 1852, and the grant was patented to Sebastián Núñez in 1863.

== See also ==
- Hill's Ferry (est.1850), a ferry across the San Joaquin River on the rancho, at the eastern border just north of the Merced River confluence
