= Pacheco Pass =

Mountain pass in the Diablo Range, California, U.S.

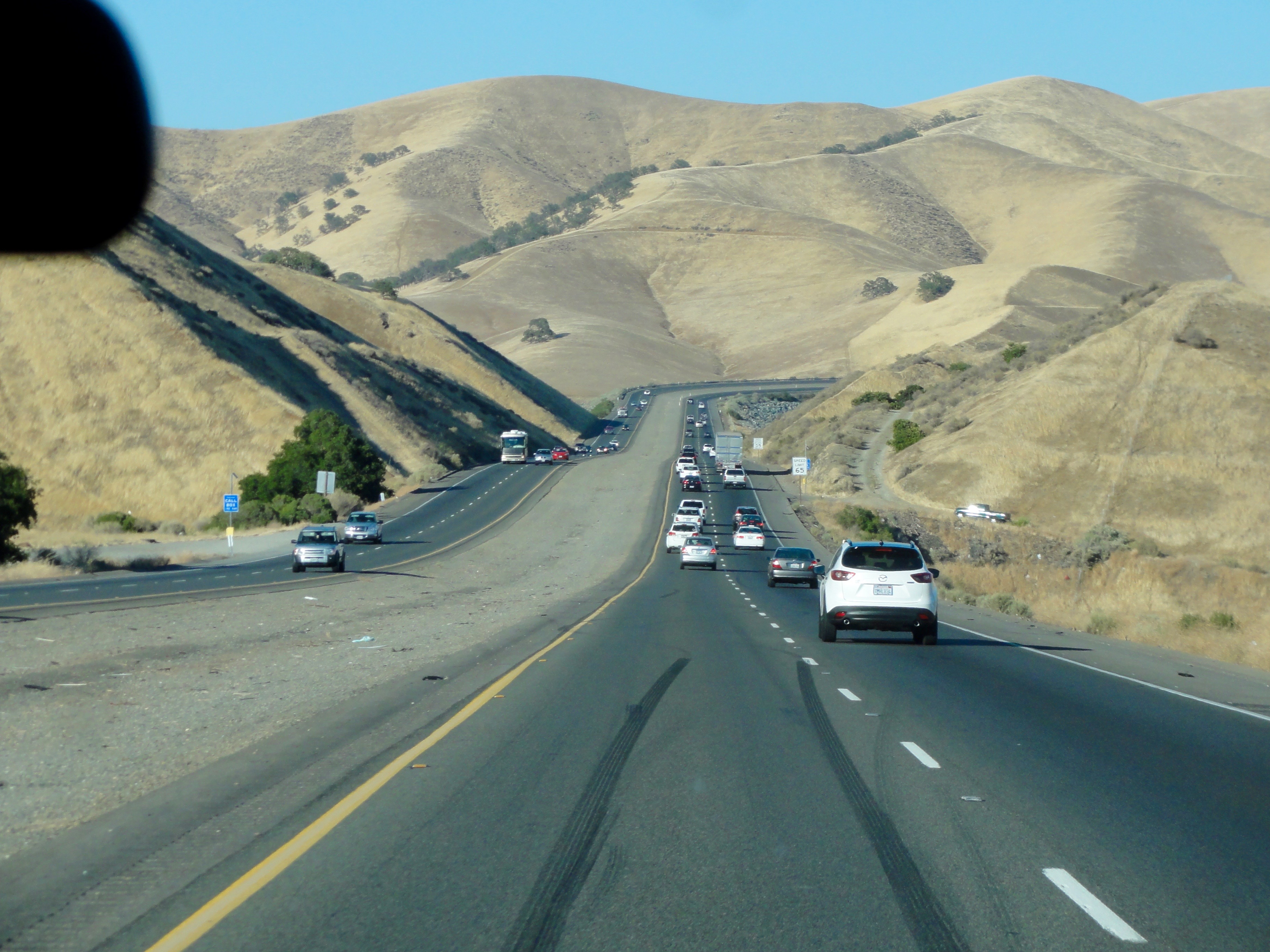
- Coming over the pass eastbound on CA 152

- Location within California
- Elevation: 1,368 ft (417 m)
- Traversed by: SR 152

Location
- Location: Santa Clara County, California, U.S.
- Range: California Coast Ranges
- Coordinates: 37°3′59″N 121°13′7″W

California Historical Landmark
- Reference no.: 829

Pacheco Pass, elevation 1,368 ft (417 m), is a low mountain pass located in the Diablo Range in southeastern Santa Clara County, California. It is the main route through the hills separating the Santa Clara Valley and the Central Valley.

As with most passes in the California Coast Ranges, it is not very high when compared to those in other mountain areas within the state. The road that traverses Pacheco Pass is State Route 152, which runs for 106 miles (171 km) between SR 1 in Watsonville and SR 99. Pacheco Pass Road, the western section between Gilroy and the pass itself (a distance of approximately 14 miles), is a two-lane highway from Gilroy to the junction with SR 156 and a four-lane highway over the pass; it has been the site of many accidents.

== Names ==
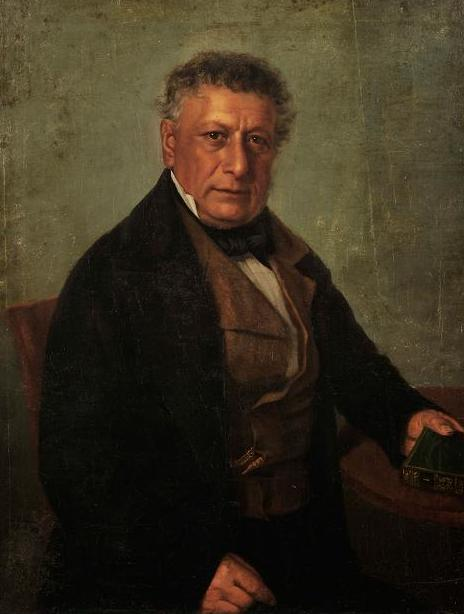
Pacheco Pass is named after Don Francisco Pérez Pacheco, a noted Californio ranchero whose lands were situated on the pass.

The pass was named for Don Francisco Pérez Pacheco, noted Californio ranchero and owner of the Rancho Ausaymas y San Felipe. In the 1850s, an informal variant name for the pass was Robber's Pass attributed to the frequent hold-ups experienced by travelers using the route.

== History ==
A trail nearby, through what is now Pacheco State Park, was used by the Yokuts people to cross the mountains and trade with other native people on the coast. Spanish army officer Gabriel Moraga first recorded the pass in 1805. From that time it was used by Spanish and later Mexican soldiers to cross over into the San Joaquin Valley, and for Native Americans in the 1820s and 1830s to cross westward to raid the missions and ranchos for horses and cattle. During the California Gold Rush it was used to travel between the Santa Clara Valley settlements and the goldfields and settlements in the San Joaquin Valley. However the east face of the pass was a steep and rough horse and mule trail, difficult for wheeled vehicles, until 1857 when Andrew D. Firebaugh built a wagon road with a gentler grade across the pass to what is now Bell Station, California from the Rancho San Luis Gonzaga at the foot of the Diablo Range to the east. Since then, it has been a major route between the Santa Clara Valley and the Central Valley. It was the site of Pacheco Pass Station one of the stage stations on the route of the Butterfield Overland Mail stagecoach route which connected the Saint Louis, Missouri with San Francisco from 1858 until 1861. Other stage lines used the route thereafter until completion of the railroads within the state.

Pacheco Pass is registered as California Historical Landmark #829.

== Nearby features ==
There are no major communities between Gilroy in the Santa Clara Valley and Los Banos in the Central Valley. The only community between the two towns is Santa Nella, which is at the junction with SR 33. There are no other major crossings of the Diablo range farther south until they are crossed again by California State Route 198 at an unnamed pass 75 miles (121 km) to the south. The next highway crossing of the range to the north is on California State Route 130 over Mount Hamilton, approximately 20 miles (32 km) to the north, but this is used less than the Altamont Pass even farther north.

On the west side of the pass lies Casa de Fruta, an extensive trading post in the valley of Pacheco Creek. Originally a site devoted to selling locally produced fruit and nuts to travelers, Casa de Fruta has expanded to include a delicatessen, truckstop, RV park, and other facilities. Casa de Fruta is the current home of the Northern California Renaissance Faire, which takes place in September and October each year. A rural locale named Bell Station also lies along the route, between Casa de Fruta and the pass.

On the eastern slope of the pass lies the San Luis Reservoir, which stores water for the Central Valley Project and the California State Water Project. The San Luis Reservoir and O'Neill Forebay operate with the 424 MW Gianelli Power Plant pumped storage hydroelectric plant. The roadway entrances to the San Luis Reservoir state recreational area and Pacheco State Park require caution entering or exiting because there are no stop signs or traffic lights and two lanes of heavy traffic in each direction.

Pacheco State Park extends to the south of the pass from its entrance on Dinosaur Point Road near the pass. There is a small 16 MW windfarm with 162 turbines located at the top of the pass that can be seen from Dinosaur Point Road. It is being repowered to 147 MW with a 50 MW / 200 MWh grid battery.

The Pacheco Pass American Viticultural Area is nearby.

== California High-Speed Rail ==
Pacheco Pass has been selected as the route that the California High-Speed Rail will take between the Bay Area and the Central Valley. The rail line is planned to travel under the pass in the 13-mile (21 km) Pacheco Pass Tunnels, which upon completion are expected to become North America's longest rail tunnels.

== See also ==
- Diablo Range−related topics
