= Rancho San Justo =

Mexican land grant in California

Coordinates: 36.860°N 121.410°W

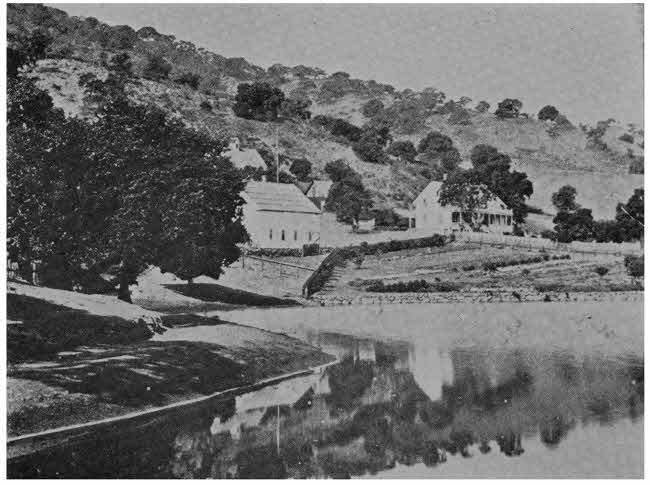
A photograph of the land from a book by Sarah Bixby Smith

Rancho San Justo was a 34,620-acre (140.1 km^{2}) Mexican land grant in present-day San Benito County, California given in 1839 by Governor Juan B. Alvarado to José Antonio Castro. The lands of the rancho include current day Hollister.

== History ==
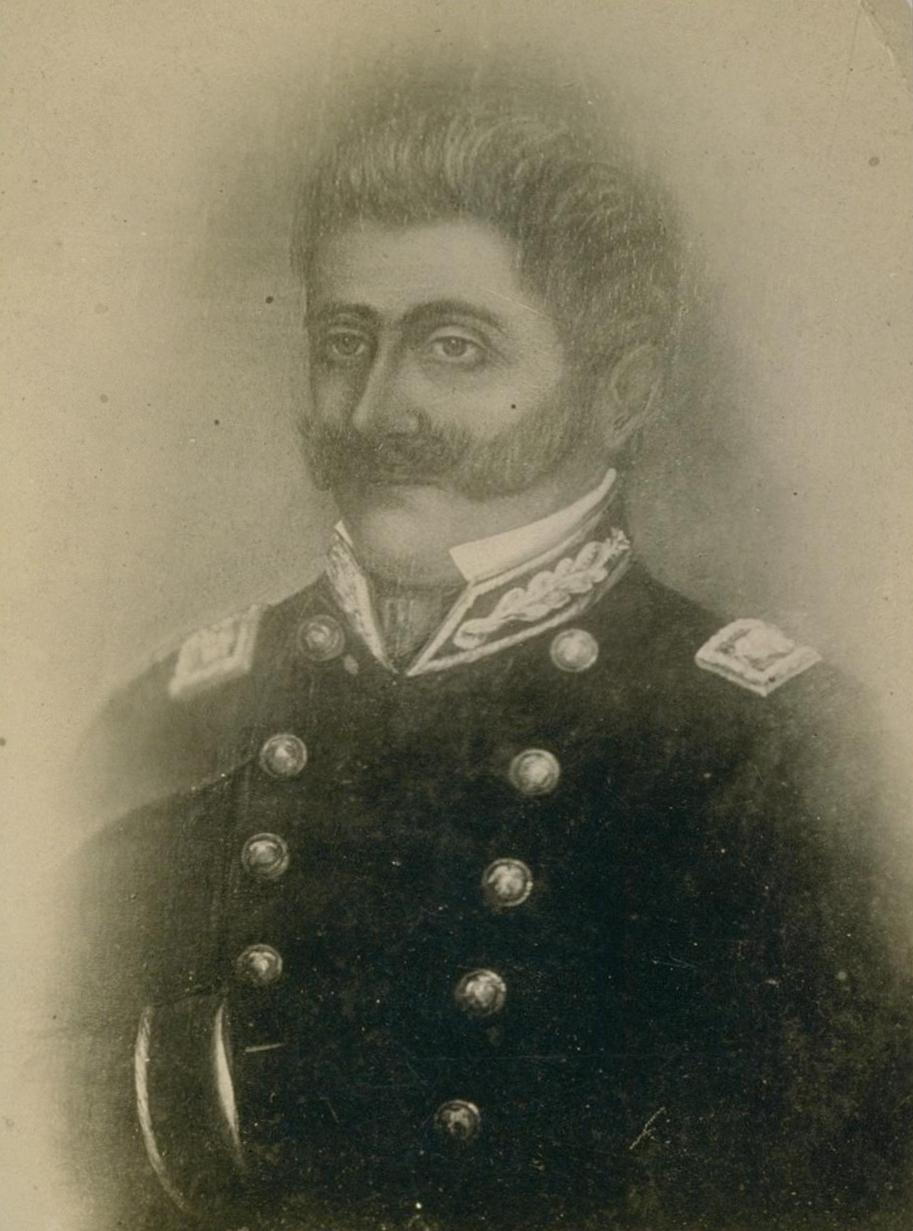
José Castro was granted Rancho San Justo in 1839.

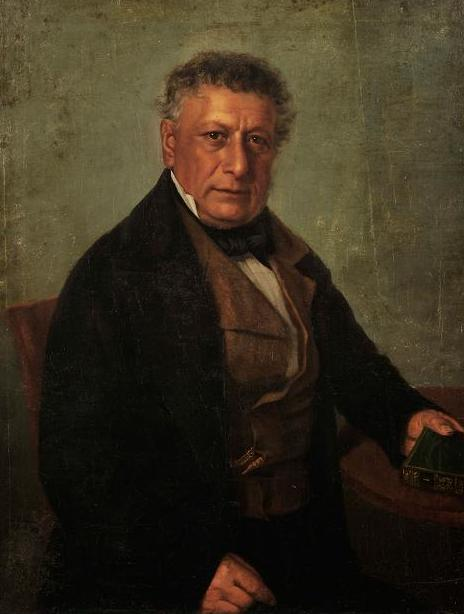
Don Francisco Pérez Pacheco purchased Rancho San Justo in 1850.

General José Castro was granted Rancho San Justo, one of three ranches attached to Mission San Juan Bautista, by the Mexican government. José Castro was the son of José Tiburcio Castro, administrator of the secularized Mission San Juan Bautista, and grantee of Rancho Sausal.

Francisco Pérez Pacheco, grantee of Rancho Ausaymas y San Felipe in 1833, bought the rancho from Castro in 1850.

With the cession of California to the United States following the Mexican–American War, the 1848 Treaty of Guadalupe Hidalgo provided that the land grants would be honored. As required by the Land Act of 1851, a claim for Rancho San Justo was filed with the Public Land Commission in 1852, and the grant was patented to Francisco Pérez Pachecoo in 1859.

In 1855 Flint, Bixby & Co bought the Rancho San Justo from Francisco Pérez Pacheco with the understanding that William Welles Hollister would buy a one-half interest in the ranch in 1857. Rancho San Justo was held in joint custody for three years, until the property was divided in 1861. Thomas Flint and Hollister dissolved their partnership, with Flint taking all the land east of the San Benito River, and Hollister the land west of the river. Later, Hollister and Flint traded holdings, with Hollister taking the land east of the San Benito River, and Flint taking the land lying to the west, including the San Juan Valley. In 1868, Colonel Hollister sold his 20,773 acres (84.07 km^{2}) of the Rancho San Justo to the San Justo Homestead Association.

== Historic sites of the Rancho ==
- Jose Castro House. Built in 1840 in San Juan Bautista is now a National Historic Landmark.
- St. Francis Retreat.

== See also ==
- Ranchos of California
- List of Ranchos of California
