= El Nido, Merced County, California =

El Nido
- Census-designated place
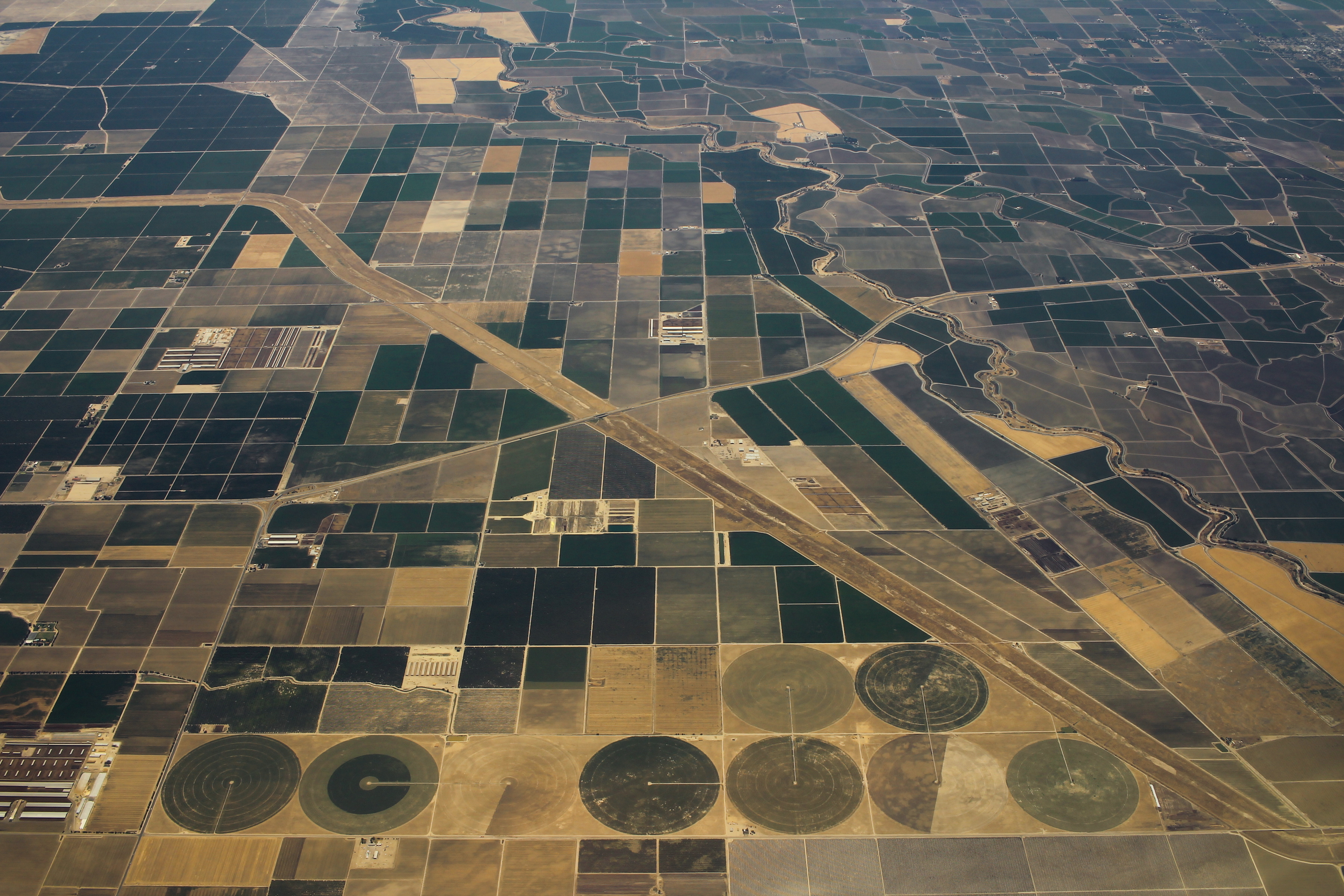
- Aerial view of El Nido

- Location in California
- Coordinates: 37°08′06″N 120°29′32″W
- Country: United States
- State: California
- County: Merced

Area
  - Total: 3.292 sq mi (8.526 km^{2})
  - Land: 3.292 sq mi (8.526 km^{2})
  - Water: 0 sq mi (0 km^{2}) 0%
- Elevation: 141 ft (43 m)

Population (2020)
  - Total: 331
  - Density: 101/sq mi (38.8/km^{2})
- Time zone: UTC−8 (Pacific)
  - Summer (DST): UTC−7 (PDT)
- ZIP Code: 95317
- Area code: 209
- GNIS feature ID: 233836, 2583007

El Nido (Spanish for "The Nest") is a census-designated place in Merced County, California, United States. It is located 11 miles (18 km) south of Merced at an elevation of 141 feet (43 m), on California State Route 59. The community had a population of 331 at the 2020 census.

== History ==
El Nido was founded early in the 20th century when the development of irrigation enabled intensified farming of the area. El Nido is Spanish for "the nest", and the name is associated with the early Spanish land grant, Rancho Chowchilla. The El Nido School District was created in 1914, and a school building designed by William Bedesen was built in 1915. The El Nido Irrigation District was organized in 1928 and began supplying water for irrigation in 1932. Cotton was the principal crop in the area and a large gin was built there in 1937.

The US Army built the Potter Auxiliary Field (1942–1945) to train World War II pilots in El Nido.

The town has a post office, a tavern, a general store, a volunteer fire department, and an elementary school. After grade 8, students from El Nido must attend high school in Merced.

The first post office opened in 1920.

The ZIP Code is 95317. The town is served by area code 209.

== Geography ==
According to the United States Census Bureau, the CDP covers an area of 3.3 square miles (8.5 km^{2}), all land.

== Demographics ==
Historical population
Census	Pop.	Note	%±
2010	330		—
2020	331		0.3%
U.S. Decennial Census; 2010

The 2020 United States census reported that El Nido had a population of 331. The population density was 100.5 inhabitants per square mile (38.8/km^{2}). The racial makeup of El Nido was 77 (23.3%) White, 0 (0.0%) African American, 6 (1.8%) Native American, 4 (1.2%) Asian, 0 (0.0%) Pacific Islander, 197 (59.5%) from other races, and 47 (14.2%) from two or more races. Hispanic or Latino of any race were 264 persons (79.8%).

The whole population lived in households. There were 93 households, out of which 46 (49.5%) had children under the age of 18 living in them, 47 (50.5%) were married-couple households, 5 (5.4%) were cohabiting couple households, 16 (17.2%) had a female householder with no partner present, and 25 (26.9%) had a male householder with no partner present; 17 households (18.3%) were one person, and 5 (5.4%) were one person aged 65 or older. The average household size was 3.56. There were 73 families (78.5% of all households).

The age distribution was 99 people (29.9%) under the age of 18, 42 people (12.7%) aged 18 to 24, 110 people (33.2%) aged 25 to 44, 61 people (18.4%) aged 45 to 64, and 19 people (5.7%) who were 65 years of age or older. The median age was 29.4 years. For every 100 females, there were 108.2 males.

There were 99 housing units at an average density of 30.1 units per square mile (11.6 units/km^{2}), of which 93 (93.9%) were occupied. Of these, 50 (53.8%) were owner-occupied, and 43 (46.2%) were occupied by renters.

== Government ==
In the California State Legislature, El Nido is in the 14th senatorial district, represented by Democrat Anna Caballero, and in the 27th Assembly district, represented by Democrat Esmeralda Soria.

In the United States House of Representatives, El Nido is in California's 13th congressional district, represented by Democrat Adam Gray.
