= Rancho Ausaymas y San Felipe =

Mexican land grant in California

Coordinates: 36.980°N 121.380°W

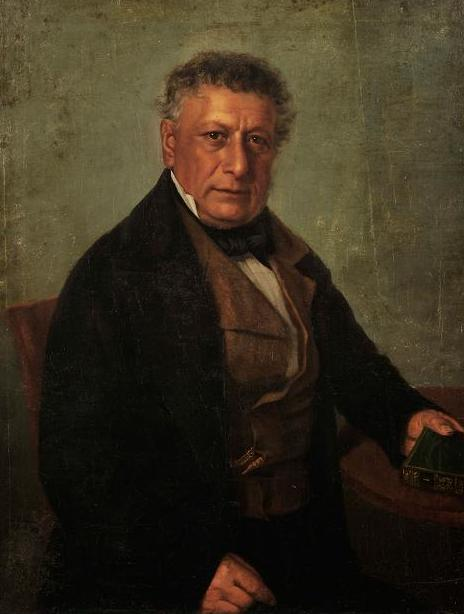
Don Francisco Pérez Pacheco was the grantee of Rancho Ausaymas y San Felipe.

Rancho Ausaymas y San Felipe was a 35,504-acre (14,368 ha) Mexican land grant in present-day San Benito County and Santa Clara County, California a consists of two square leagues (San Felipe) given in 1833 by Governor José Figueroa and two square leagues (Ausaymas) given in 1836 by Governor Nicolás Gutiérrez to Francisco Pérez Pacheco. An augmentation of three square leagues was given in 1836 by Governor Gutiérrez. The grant was along the Pacheco Pass east of present-day Gilroy

== History ==
Francisco Pérez Pacheco (1793–1860), born in Mexico, came to Monterey in 1819, with his wife Feliciana González (1798–1857). He was a carpenter and wagon maker for the Spanish army. He later held various positions of responsibility, both military and civilian, in Monterey.

With the cession of California to the United States following the Mexican-American War, the 1848 Treaty of Guadalupe Hidalgo provided that the land grants would be honored. As required by the Land Act of 1851, a claim for the four square league Rancho Ausaymas y San Felipe and a claim for the three square league augmentation was filed with the Public Land Commission in 1852. The grant was patented to Francisco Pérez Pacheco in 1859.

Francisco Pérez Pacheco continued to add to his holdings. He was granted the adjoining Rancho Bolsa de San Felipe in 1840, and bought Rancho San Justo in 1850. In 1843 Francisco Pérez Pacheco's son, Juan Carlos Pacheco (1823–1855), was granted Rancho San Luis Gonzaga, which abutted Rancho Ausaymas y San Felipe on the east. In 1855 the son died, and the property went to Francisco Pérez Pacheco. In 1840, his daughter María Jacinta Pacheco (1813 – ) married Sebastián Nuñez, grantee of Rancho Orestimba y Las Garzas. In 1857, Pacheco sold four leagues of the rancho, as well as Rancho Bolsa de San Felipe to James Dunne Sr., Peter Dunne and Gustave Touchard, who named the property San Felipe Ranch. Franklin O’Connell acquired the ranch from the Dunne family in 1936.

Upon Francisco Pérez Pacheco's death in 1860, as the only surviving child, Ysidora inherited most of the Pacheco holdings. In 1850, María Isidora Pacheco (1829–1892) married Mariano Malarin (1827–1895), son of the grantee of Rancho Chualar. When María Isidora Pacheco died in 1892, her estate consisted of Rancho San Luis Gonzaga and half of Rancho Ausaymas y San Felipe.

== See also ==
- Ranchos of California
- List of Ranchos of California
