= Rancho Chualar =

Land grant in California

Coordinates: 36.580°N 121.480°W

Rancho Chualar was a 8,890-acre (36.0 km^{2}) Mexican land grant in the Salinas Valley, in present-day Monterey County, California. It was given in 1839 by Governor pro tem Manuel Jimeno to Juan Malarín.

The grant extended along the north bank of the Salinas River, and encompassed present-day Chualar.

== History ==
Juan Malarín (1792–1849), a sea captain from Peru, came to California in 1822. As a reward for services rendered the Mexican Government, he was made a Lieutenant in the Mexican Navy. He made Monterey his home, and in 1824 he married Maria Josefa Joaquina Estrada, a daughter of José Mariano Estrada, grantee of Rancho Buena Vista. He was grantee of the two square league Rancho Guadalupe y Llanitos de los Correos in 1833, and the two square league Rancho Chualar in 1839. He also acquired Rancho Zanjones. When Malarín died in 1849, his son, Mariano Malarín, took charge of the family estate.

With the cession of California to the United States following the Mexican-American War, the 1848 Treaty of Guadalupe Hidalgo provided that the land grants would be honored. As required by the Land Act of 1851, a claim for Rancho Chualar was filed with the Public Land Commission in 1852, and the grant was patented to Mariano Malarín in 1872.

In 1859, Mariano Malarín (1827-1895) married Ysidora Pacheco (-1892), a daughter of Francisco Pacheco, owner of Rancho Ausaymas y San Felipe.

David Jacks later owned an interest in the rancho and Rancho Zanjones.

== See also ==
- Ranchos of California
- List of Ranchos of California
