= List of places in California (G) =

This list of current:

- cities
- towns, unincorporated communities
- counties, and other recognized places in the U.S. state of California.

Information on the number and names of counties in which the place lies, and its lower and upper ZIP Code bounds, if applicable are also included.

Name of place	Number of counties	Principal county	Lower zip code	Upper zip code
Gabilan	1	Monterey County	93901	
Gabilan Acres	1	Monterey County	93901	
Gale	1	San Bernardino County		
Galindo	1	Contra Costa County		
Galivan	1	Orange County		
Gallinas	1	Marin County	94903	
Galt	1	Sacramento County	95632	
Ganesha	1	Los Angeles County		
Ganns	1	Calaveras County		
Ganser Bar	1	Plumas County	95915	
Garberville	1	Humboldt County	95442	
Gardena	1	Los Angeles County	90247	49
Garden Acres	1	San Joaquin County	95205	
Gardena Village	1	San Mateo County	94015	
Garden Farms	1	San Luis Obispo County	93422	
Garden Gate Village	1	Santa Clara County	95014	
Garden Grove	1	Orange County	92840	45
Gardenland	1	Sacramento County		
Garden Valley	1	El Dorado County	95633	
Garden Village	1	San Mateo County	94015	
Garey	1	Santa Barbara County	93455	
Garfield	1	Kern County	93205	
Garlock	1	Kern County	93554	
Garnet	1	Riverside County		
Garvanza	1	Los Angeles County		
Gasoline Alley	1	Placer County	95603	
Gas Point	1	Shasta County	96022	
Gasquet	1	Del Norte County	95543	
Gaston	1	Nevada County		
Gateley	1	Contra Costa County		
Gates	1	Santa Barbara County		
Gates	1	Solano County	95688	
Gateway	1	Nevada County	95734	
Gato	1	Santa Barbara County		
Gaviota	1	Santa Barbara County	93117	
Gazelle	1	Siskiyou County	96034	
Geary	1	San Francisco County	94121	
Gemco	1	Los Angeles County		
Gene	1	San Bernardino County	92242	
Genesee	1	Plumas County	95983	
Genevra	1	Colusa County		
George	1	San Bernardino County		
George Air Force Base	1	San Bernardino County	92394	
Georgetown	1	El Dorado County	95634	
George Washington	1	San Diego County	92102	
Gepford	1	Kings County		
Gerber	1	Tehama County	96035	
Gerber-Las Flores	1	Tehama County		
Geyser Resort	1	Sonoma County	95425	
Geyserville	1	Sonoma County	95441	
Giant	1	Contra Costa County		
Giant Forest	1	Tulare County	93262	
Gibson	1	Shasta County		
Gibsonville	1	Sierra County		
Giffen Cantua Ranch	1	Fresno County		
Gilberts	1	El Dorado County		
Gillete	1	Tulare County		
Gillis	1	San Joaquin County		
Gillis	1	Siskiyou County		
Gilman Hot Springs	1	Riverside County	92583	
Gilroy	1	Santa Clara County	95020	
Gilroy Hot Springs	1	Santa Clara County	95020	
Girvan	1	Shasta County		
Glacier Lodge	1	Inyo County	93513	
Glamis	1	Imperial County	92248	
Glannvale	1	Sacramento County		
Glasgow	1	San Bernardino County		
Glassell	1	Los Angeles County	90065	
Glen Arbor	1	Santa Cruz County	95005	
Glen Avon	1	Riverside County	92509	
Glen Avon Heights	1	Riverside County	92509	
Glenblair	1	Mendocino County		
Glen Blair Junction	1	Mendocino County		
Glenbrook	1	Lake County		
Glenbrook	1	Nevada County		
Glenbrook Heights	1	Nevada County	95945	
Glenburn	1	Shasta County	96036	
Glencoe	1	Calaveras County	95232	
Glencove	1	Solano County		
Glendale	1	Humboldt County	95521	
Glendale	1	Los Angeles County	91201	26
Glendale Junction	1	Los Angeles County		
Glendora	1	Los Angeles County	91740	
Glen Ellen	1	Sonoma County	95442	
Glen Essex	1	Humboldt County		
Glen Frazer	1	Contra Costa County		
Glenhaven	1	Lake County	95443	
Glen Martin	1	San Bernardino County	92305	
Glenn	1	Glenn County	95943	
Glennville	1	Kern County	93226	
Glenoaks	1	Los Angeles County	91504	
Glenshire	1	Nevada County	96161	
Glenshire-Devonshire	1	Nevada County		
Glen Valley	1	Riverside County		
Glenview	1	Lake County		
Glenview	1	Los Angeles County	90290	
Glenview	1	San Diego County	92021	
Glenwood	1	Santa Cruz County		
Globe	1	Sacramento County		
Globe Mill	1	Trinity County		
Glorietta	1	Contra Costa County	94563	
Glorietta	1	Fresno County		
Goat Rock	1	Sonoma County		
Goble	1	Fresno County		
Goffs	1	San Bernardino County	92332	
Golden Cove	1	Los Angeles County	90274	
Golden Gate National Recreation Area	2	Marin County	94123	
Golden Gate National Recreation Area	2	San Francisco County	94123	
Golden Hill	1	San Diego County		
Golden Hills	1	Kern County	93561	
Golden Valley	1	Los Angeles County	91350	
Gold Flat	1	Nevada County	95959	
Gold Gulch	1	Santa Cruz County	95018	
Gold Hill	1	El Dorado County	95667	
Goldleaf	1	Fresno County		
Gold River	1	Sacramento County	95670	
Gold Run	1	Placer County	95717	
Goldstone	1	San Bernardino County		
Goldtree	1	San Luis Obispo County		
Goler Heights	1	Kern County		
Goleta	1	Santa Barbara County	93117	
Gonzales	1	Monterey County	93926	
Goodale	1	Tulare County		
Goodmill	1	Fresno County		
Goodyears Bar	1	Sierra County	95944	
Gorda	1	Monterey County	93920	
Gordola	1	Santa Cruz County		
Gordon	1	Fresno County		
Gorman	1	Los Angeles County	93243	
Gosford	1	Kern County		
Goshen	1	Tulare County	93227	
Goshen Junction	1	Tulare County		
Gotri	1	San Joaquin County		
Gottsville	1	Siskiyou County		
Government Island	1	Alameda County	94501	
Grabners	1	Fresno County		
Grabtown	1	San Mateo County		
Graeagle	1	Plumas County	96103	
Graham	1	Los Angeles County	90002	
Granada Hills	1	Los Angeles County	91344	
Grand Avenue	1	Riverside County	92330	
Grand Central	1	Los Angeles County	91201	
Grand Island	1	Colusa County		
Grand Lake	1	Alameda County	94610	
Grand Terrace	1	San Bernardino County	92324	
Grandview	1	San Bernardino County		
Grandview-Palos Verdes	1	Los Angeles County	90274	
Grangeville	1	Kings County	93230	
Granite Bay	1	Placer County	95746	
Granite Bay Vista	1	Placer County	95678	
Granite Hills	1	San Diego County		
Granite Springs	1	Mariposa County		
Graniteville	1	Nevada County	95959	
Grant	1	Sonoma County		
Grantville	1	San Diego County	92120	
Grape	1	San Bernardino County		
Grapeland	1	San Bernardino County		
Grapevine	1	Kern County		
Grapit	1	Glenn County		
Grass Flat	1	Sierra County		
Grass Lake	1	Siskiyou County		
Grass Valley	1	Nevada County	95945	
Graton	1	Sonoma County	95444	
Gravenstein	1	Sonoma County		
Gravesboro	1	Fresno County		
Gray Rocks	1	Shasta County		
Grays Flat	1	Plumas County		
Grayson	1	Stanislaus County	95363	
Greeley	1	Kern County	93312	
Greeley Hill	1	Mariposa County		
Green	1	Los Angeles County	90037	
Green Acres	1	Kern County	93527	
Greenacres	1	Kern County	93312	
Greenbrae	1	Marin County	94904	
Greenbrook	1	Contra Costa County	94526	
Greendale	1	Yolo County		
Greenfield	1	Kern County		
Greenfield	1	Monterey County	93927	
Greenfield Corners	1	Kern County		
Greenhaven Seventy	1	Sacramento County		
Greenhorn	1	Plumas County		
Greenmead	1	Los Angeles County	90059	
Greenspot	1	Contra Costa County		
Greenspot	1	San Bernardino County	92359	
Green Valley	1	Los Angeles County	91350	
Green Valley	1	Solano County		
Green Valley Estates	1	Solano County	94585	
Green Valley Lake	1	San Bernardino County	92341	
Greenview	1	Siskiyou County	96037	
Greenview Acres	1	Humboldt County	95521	
Greenville	1	Plumas County	95947	
Greenville	1	Yuba County		
Greenville Rancheria	1	Plumas County		
Greenwater	1	Inyo County		
Greenwich Village	1	Ventura County	91360	
Greenwood	1	El Dorado County	95635	
Greenwood	1	Glenn County		
Greenwood	1	Mendocino County		
Gregg	1	Madera County		
Grenada	1	Siskiyou County	96038	
Gridley	1	Butte County	95948	
Griffith	1	Los Angeles County	90039	
Grimes	1	Colusa County	95950	
Griminger	1	El Dorado County		
Grindstone Rancheria	1	Glenn County	95939	
Grizzly Flats	1	El Dorado County	95636	
Grossmont	1	San Diego County	91942	
Grove	1	Mendocino County		
Grove Highlands	1	Monterey County	93950	
Groveland	1	Tuolumne County	95321	
Groveland-Big Oak Flat	1	Tuolumne County		
Grover	1	San Luis Obispo County		
Grover Beach	1	San Luis Obispo County	93433	
Grover City	1	San Luis Obispo County	93433	
Guadalcanal Village	1	Solano County		
Guadalupe	1	Santa Barbara County	93434	
Gualala	1	Mendocino County	95445	
Guasti	1	San Bernardino County	91743	
Guatay	1	San Diego County	91931	
Guerneville	1	Sonoma County	95446	
Guernewood	1	Sonoma County	95446	
Guernewood Park	1	Sonoma County	95446	
Guernsey	1	Kings County	93230	
Guernsey Mill	1	Tulare County	93260	
Guidiville Trust Lands	1	Mendocino County		
Guild	1	San Joaquin County		
Guinda	1	Yolo County	95637	
Gulf	1	Kern County		
Gum	1	Santa Barbara County		
Gustine	1	Merced County	95322	
Gypsite	1	Kern County		
