= Glenview =

Glenview may refer to:

== United States ==
- Glenview, California (disambiguation), several places
- Glenview, Illinois
  - Glenview station, a Metra and Amtrak rail station in Glenview, Illinois
  - Naval Air Station Glenview, an operational U.S. Naval Air Station from 1923 to 1995
- Glenview, Kentucky
- Glenview (Stony Creek, Virginia), a historic house
- Glenview Historic District (Memphis, Tennessee), listed on the National Register of Historic Places (NRHP) in Tennessee
- John Bond Trevor House in Yonkers, New York, listed on the NRHP and sometimes known as Glenview

== Other uses ==
- Glenview, New Zealand, a suburb of Hamilton, New Zealand
- Glenview, Queensland, Australia, a locality in the Sunshine Coast Region
- Glenview, Tallaght, a series of small estates in Tallaght, Ireland
- Glenview Health, a health services organisation in Victoria, Australia

== See also ==
- Glenview Historic District (disambiguation)
