= La Porte, California =

La Porte
- Unincorporated Community; Census Designated Place
- Location in Plumas County and the state of California

- Location in the United States
- Coordinates: 39°40′55″N 120°59′5″W
- Country: United States
- State: California
- County: Plumas

Area
  - Total: 4.457 sq mi (11.544 km^{2})
  - Land: 4.457 sq mi (11.544 km^{2})
  - Water: 0 sq mi (0 km^{2}) 0%
- Elevation: 4,980 ft (1,518 m)

Population (2020)
  - Total: 65
  - Density: 15/sq mi (5.6/km^{2})
- Time zone: UTC-8 (Pacific (PST))
  - Summer (DST): UTC-7 (PDT)
- ZIP code: 95981
- Area codes: 530, 837
- FIPS code: 06-40312
- GNIS feature ID: 0262254

La Porte is a census-designated place (CDP) in Plumas County, California, United States. The population was 65 at the 2020 census. The town was known as Rabbit Creek until 1857.

== Geography ==
La Porte is located at 39°40′55″N 120°59′5″W (39.681908, -120.984732).

According to the United States Census Bureau, the CDP has a total area of 4.5 square miles (12 km^{2}), all land.

=== Little Grass Valley Reservoir ===
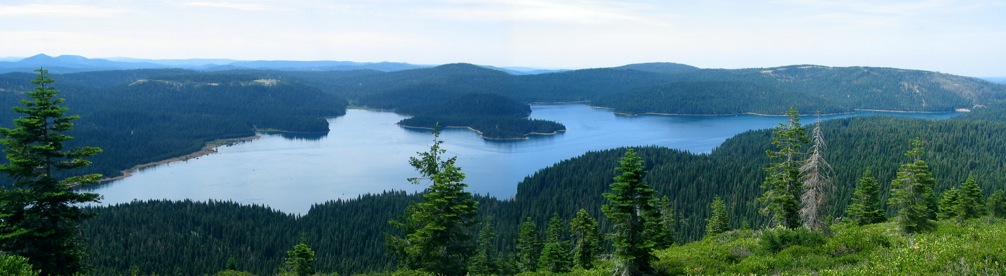
Little Grass Valley Reservoir as seen from atop nearby Bald Mountain

Completed in 1961, the nearby Little Grass Valley Reservoir is a popular summer water sports area. Hiking, equestrian, and OHV trails surround the lake.

== Demographics ==
Historical population
Census	Pop.	Note	%±
1850	0		—
1860	998		—
1870	640		−35.9%
1880	400		−37.5%
1890	214		−46.5%
1930	45		—
1940	11		−75.6%
1950	25		127.3%
1960	27		8.0%
1970	35		29.6%
2000	43		—
2010	26		−39.5%
2020	65		150.0%
U.S. Decennial Census; 1860–1870 1880-1890; 1900 1910 1920; 1930 1940 1950; 1960 1970 1980; 1990 2000 2010

La Porte first appeared as a census designated place in the 2000 U.S. census.

=== 2020 ===
La Porte CDP, California – Racial and ethnic composition Note: the US Census treats Hispanic/Latino as an ethnic category. This table excludes Latinos from the racial categories and assigns them to a separate category. Hispanics/Latinos may be of any race.
Race / Ethnicity (NH = Non-Hispanic)	Pop 2000	Pop 2010	Pop 2020	% 2000	% 2010	% 2020
White alone (NH)	41	24	56	95.35%	92.31%	86.15%
Black or African American alone (NH)	0	1	0	0.00%	3.85%	0.00%
Native American or Alaska Native alone (NH)	1	1	1	2.33%	3.85%	1.54%
Asian alone (NH)	0	0	0	0.00%	0.00%	0.00%
Native Hawaiian or Pacific Islander alone (NH)	0	0	0	0.00%	0.00%	0.00%
Other race alone (NH)	0	0	0	0.00%	0.00%	0.00%
Mixed race or Multiracial (NH)	1	0	6	2.33%	0.00%	9.23%
Hispanic or Latino (any race)	0	0	2	0.00%	0.00%	3.08%
Total	43	26	65	100.00%	100.00%	100.00%

At the 2020 census La Porte CDP had a population of 65. There were 18 households, and 135 housing units.

=== 2010 ===
At the 2010 census La Porte had a population of 26. The population density was 5.8 inhabitants per square mile (2.2/km^{2}). The racial makeup of La Porte was 24 (92%) White, 1 (4%) African American, 1 (4%) Native American, 0 (0%) Asian, 0 (0%) Pacific Islander, 0 (0%) from other races, and 0 (0%) from two or more races. Hispanic or Latino of any race were 0 people (0.0%).

The whole population lived in households, no one lived in non-institutionalized group quarters and no one was institutionalized.

There were 15 households, 3 (20%) had children under the age of 18 living in them, 7 (47%) were opposite-sex married couples living together, 1 (7%) had a female householder with no husband present, 0 (0%) had a male householder with no wife present. There were 0 (0%) unmarried opposite-sex partnerships, and 0 (0%) same-sex married couples or partnerships. 7 households (47%) were one person and 3 (20%) had someone living alone who was 65 or older. The average household size was 1.7. There were 8 families (53% of households); the average family size was 2.4.

The age distribution was 4 people (15%) under the age of 18, 0 people (0%) aged 18 to 24, 3 people (12%) aged 25 to 44, 13 people (50%) aged 45 to 64, and 6 people (23%) who were 65 or older. The median age was 56 years. For every 100 females, there were 100.0 males. For every 100 females age 18 and over, there were 100.0 males.

There were 145 housing units at an average density of 32.5 per square mile, of the occupied units 10 (67%) were owner-occupied and 5 (33%) were rented. The homeowner vacancy rate was 17%; the rental vacancy rate was 0%. 17 people (65% of the population) lived in owner-occupied housing units and 9 people (35%) lived in rental housing units.

=== 2000 ===
At the 2000 census there were 43 people, 28 households, and 12 families in the CDP. The population density was 9.6 inhabitants per square mile (3.7/km^{2}). There were 131 housing units at an average density of 29.2 per square mile (11.3/km^{2}). The racial makeup of the CDP was 95% White, 2% Native American, and 2% from two or more races. 0% of the population were Hispanic or Latino of any race. Of the 28 households 4% had children under the age of 18 living with them, 39% were married couples living together, and 54% were non-families. 50% of households were one person and 25% were one person aged 65 or older. The average household size was 1.5 and the average family size was 2.1.

The age distribution was 5% under the age of 18, 2% from 18 to 24, 2% from 25 to 44, 54% from 45 to 64, and 37% 65 or older. The median age was 60 years. For every 100 females, there were 187 males. For every 100 females age 18 and over, there were 173 males.

The median household income was $30,781 and the median family income was $11,250. Males had a median income of $12,083 versus $0 for females. The per capita income for the CDP was $18,258. There were 100% of families and 65% of the population living below the poverty line, including 100% of under eighteens and none of those over 64.

== Politics ==
In the state legislature, La Porte is in the 1st senatorial district, represented by Republican Megan Dahle, and the 1st Assembly district, represented by Republican Heather Hadwick.

Federally, La Porte is in California's 3rd congressional district, represented by Independent Kevin Kiley.

== History ==
At the time of statehood in 1850, La Porte was located in Yuba County, one of California's 27 original counties.
In 1852, Sierra County was created from part of Yuba County. After that time, La Porte was located in Sierra County.
In 1854, Plumas County was created from part of Butte County. In 1866, a further realignment placed La Porte in Plumas County, where it has remained ever since.

La Porte was named Rabbit Creek until 1857. Gold was found in Rabbit Creek in 1850. It was a hub of gold mining activity and commerce in the region during the California Gold Rush. The town was largely destroyed by fires in 1855, 1861, 1868, 1871 and 1905.

=== Rabbit Creek House ===
Rabbit Creek Hotel - Rabbit Creek House was built in 1852 by Eli S. Lester. This was the first building in Rabbit Creek. The Rabbit Creek House had a Hotel, trading post and two barns for horses. Busy during the Gold Rush, the site of the Rabbit Creek Hotel is a California Historical Landmark No. 213 at the north corner of Main Street and Church Streets.

=== Civil War era ===
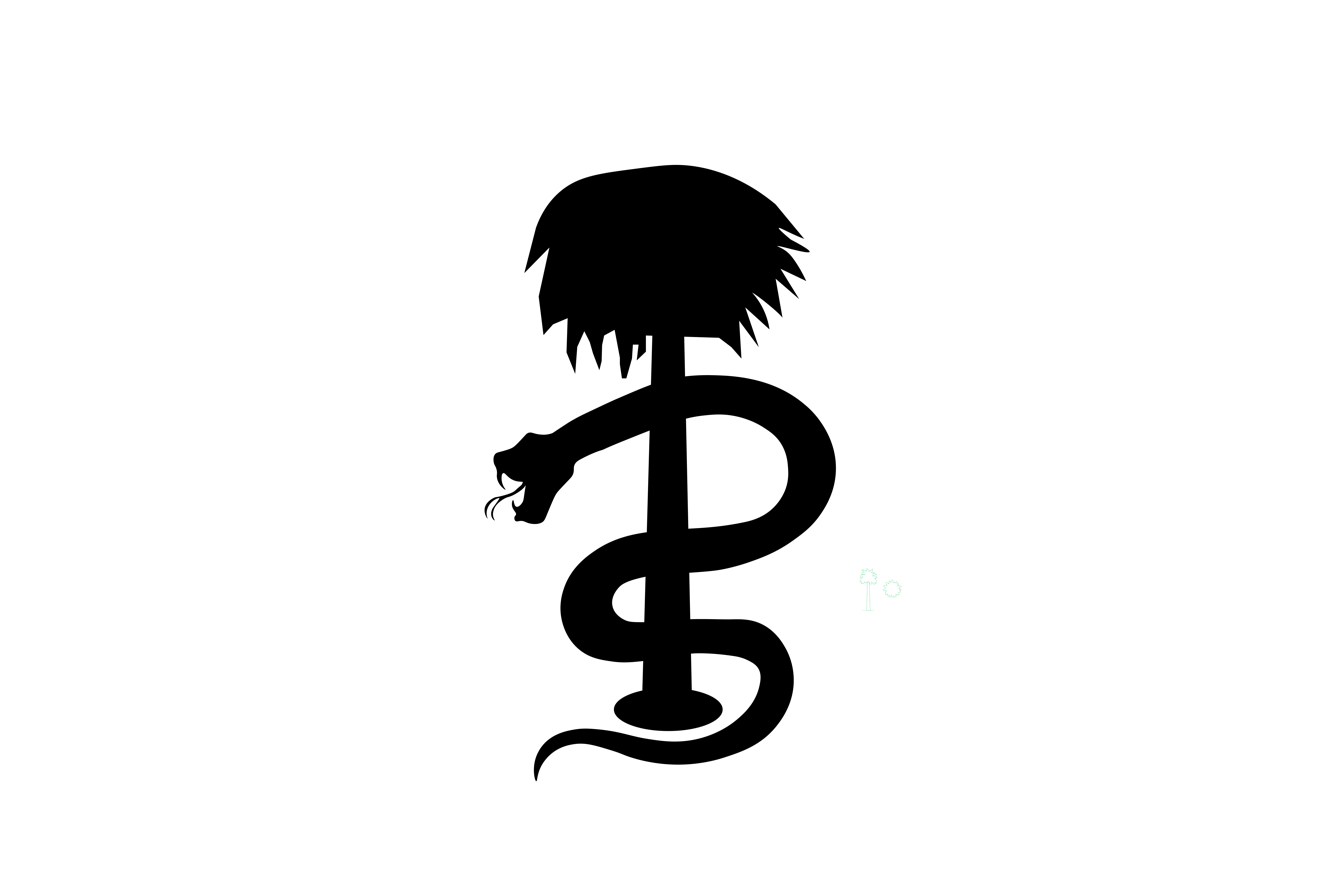
Digital reconstruction of Dockery's Palmetto flag from newspaper accounts

Digital reconstruction of the American flag raised on July 4th, 1862

During the first year of the Civil War some residents wanted to show support for the Rebellion. They raised a Palmetto Flag near Dockery's Saloon which was described in one source as "A piece of white cotton cloth, ornamented with a charcoal sketch of a palmetto tree and black snake." Soon after it was raised the banner was removed. The local militia known as the Sierra Greys would joined the 1st California Infantry and later became company F. In 1862, the town also organized a company of calvary that which later joined the 2nd Massachusetts Calvary. On July 4, they celebrate the departure of their men to the east by raising a unique American flag with red, white and blue stripes. A year later a group of citizen in town organized the La Porte Guards a pro-union militia.

The 1886 Scott home at Poker Flat

=== Howland Flat and Poker Flat ===
About 12 miles (19 km) outside La Porte, via the Port Wine Ridge Road in adjacent Sierra County, lies the remains of the former gold mining town of Howland Flat.

Also on Port Wine Ridge Road, and southwest of Mount Fillmore, the ghost town of Grass Flat is located. It is the site of extensive gold rush hydraulic mining, with a dramatic and barren landscape still remaining.

The ghost town of Poker Flat is located on the Poker Flat OHV trail in the Plumas National Forest. The last-standing structure of Poker Flat, the 1886 Scott House, stood until the winter of 2014–15, when it collapsed.

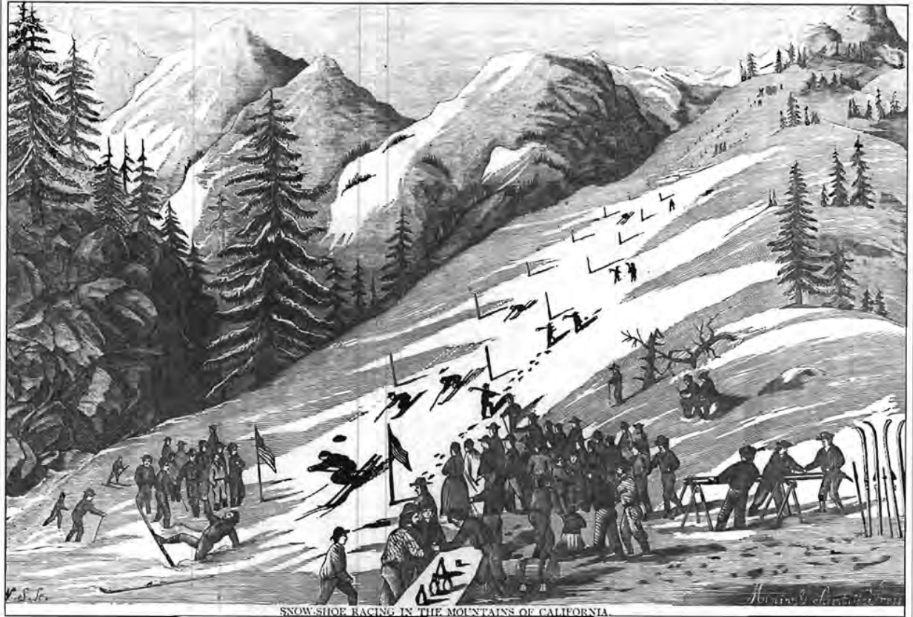
Sierra Longboard Racing, 1874

=== Sierra longboard racing ===
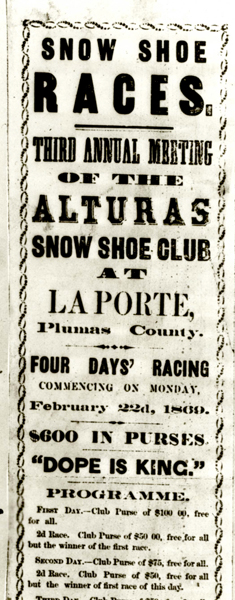
1869 Alturas Snow Shoe Club race meet

Skiing may have been practiced in Rabbit Creek as early as 1851 by Hamilton Ward and James Murray using improvised barrel staves. In 1866 the Alturas Snowshoe Club was formed at La Porte. This longboard racing association was founded by Creed Haymond to arrange the local Norwegian snow-shoe club tournaments at Onion Valley, Port Wine, St. Louis, Pine Grove, Howland Flat, Newark, Gibsonville, and others. The last annual La Porte tournament was held in 1911, although revivals were held in 1938, 1941, 1951–1952, 1964 and since 1993 at nearby California locations.

California Historical Landmarks 723 and 724 note La Porte as a Pioneer Ski Area of America. Plumas National Forest Service placed an informational placard atop nearby Lexington Hill, replacing a 1991 Alturas Snowshoe Club marker which commemorated the start of organized downhill ski racing in the western hemisphere.

== Education ==
The school district is Plumas Unified School District.

== Notable people ==
- Charlotte Ah Tye Chang (1873–1972), Chinese-American activist born in La Porte
- Claire Cayot O'Rourke, supercentenarian and the first woman to hold public office in the state of California.

== See also ==
- California Historical Landmarks in Plumas County
- The Union Hotel, La Porte, California
- Gold Country
