= Stevinson, California =

- Census-designated place
- Location within California Location within the United States
- Coordinates: 37°19′40″N 120°51′06″W
- Country: United States
- State: California
- County: Merced

Area
  - Total: 1.130 sq mi (2.927 km^{2})
  - Land: 1.130 sq mi (2.927 km^{2})
  - Water: 0 sq mi (0 km^{2}) 0%
- Elevation: 85 ft (26 m)

Population (2020)
  - Total: 275
  - Density: 243/sq mi (94.0/km^{2})
- Time zone: UTC-8 (Pacific (PST))
  - Summer (DST): UTC-7 (PDT)
- ZIP Code: 95374
- Area code: 209
- GNIS feature IDs: 1659870; 2583152

Stevinson is an unincorporated community and census-designated place in Merced County, California, United States. It is located 21 miles (34 km) west of Merced at an elevation of 85 feet (26 m). The population was 275 at the 2020 census, down from 313 at the 2010 census.

The Stevinson post office opened in 1907. The name honors James J. Stevinson, who bought land nearby in 1852.

The town is noted for its bullring, where Portuguese bullfighting is staged regularly. It is one of several bullrings maintained by the Portuguese-American community throughout California's Central Valley.

The US Army built the Howard Auxiliary Field (1942–1944) to train World War II pilots in Stevinson.

== Geography ==
Stevinson is in northwestern Merced County, north of the intersection of State Routes 140 and 165. SR 140 leads east 20 miles (32 km) to Merced, the county seat, and southwest 10 miles (16 km) to Gustine, while SR 165 leads north 12 miles (19 km) to Turlock and south 19 miles (31 km) to Los Banos.

According to the United States Census Bureau, the Stevinson CDP covers an area of 1.1 square miles (2.8 km^{2}), all land.

=== Climate ===
This region experiences warm (but not hot) and dry summers, with no average monthly temperatures above 71.6 °F (22.0 °C). According to the Köppen Climate Classification system, Stevinson has a warm-summer Mediterranean climate, abbreviated "Csb" on climate maps.

== Demographics ==
Historical population
Census	Pop.	Note	%±
2010	273		—
2020	275		0.7%
U.S. Decennial Census; 1850–1870 1880-1890; 1900 1910 1920; 1930 1940 1950; 1960 1970 1980; 1990 2000 2010

Stevinson first appeared as a census designated place in the 2010 U.S. census.

The 2020 United States census reported that Stevinson had a population of 275. The population density was 243.4 inhabitants per square mile (94.0/km^{2}). The racial makeup of Stevinson was 171 (62.2%) White, 0 (0.0%) African American, 1 (0.4%) Native American, 0 (0.0%) Asian, 1 (0.4%) Pacific Islander, 79 (28.7%) from other races, and 23 (8.4%) from two or more races. Hispanic or Latino of any race were 133 persons (48.4%).

The whole population lived in households. There were 81 households, out of which 39 (48.1%) had children under the age of 18 living in them, 46 (56.8%) were married-couple households, 6 (7.4%) were cohabiting couple households, 13 (16.0%) had a female householder with no partner present, and 16 (19.8%) had a male householder with no partner present. 5 households (6.2%) were one person, and 1 (1.2%) were one person aged 65 or older. The average household size was 3.4. There were 70 families (86.4% of all households).

The age distribution was 79 people (28.7%) under the age of 18, 21 people (7.6%) aged 18 to 24, 64 people (23.3%) aged 25 to 44, 71 people (25.8%) aged 45 to 64, and 40 people (14.5%) who were 65 years of age or older. The median age was 37.3 years. For every 100 females, there were 111.5 males.

There were 85 housing units at an average density of 75.2 units per square mile (29.0 units/km^{2}), of which 81 (95.3%) were occupied. Of these, 47 (58.0%) were owner-occupied, and 34 (42.0%) were occupied by renters.
