= Glenview Historic District =

Glenview Historic District may refer to:

- Glenview Historic District (Glenview, Kentucky), listed on the NRHP in Jefferson County, Kentucky
- Glenview Historic District (Memphis, Tennessee), listed on the NRHP in Tennessee

== See also ==
- Glenview (disambiguation)
