= California State Route 165 =

Highway in California

State Route 165

- Map of central California with SR 165 highlighted in red

Route information
- Maintained by Caltrans
- Length: 38.27 mi (61.59 km)

Major junctions
- South end: I-5 near Los Banos
- SR 33 / SR 152 in Los Banos; SR 140 near Stevinson; CR J18 near Hilmar
- North end: SR 99 / CR J14 in Turlock

Location
- Country: United States
- State: California
- Counties: Merced, Stanislaus

Highway system
- State highways in California; Interstate; US; State; Scenic; History; Pre‑1964; Unconstructed; Deleted; Freeways
| ← SR 164 | → SR 166 |

State Route 165 (SR 165) is a rural north–south state highway in the U.S. state of California. It runs in the San Joaquin Valley from Interstate 5 south of Los Banos to State Route 99 in Turlock.

== Route description ==
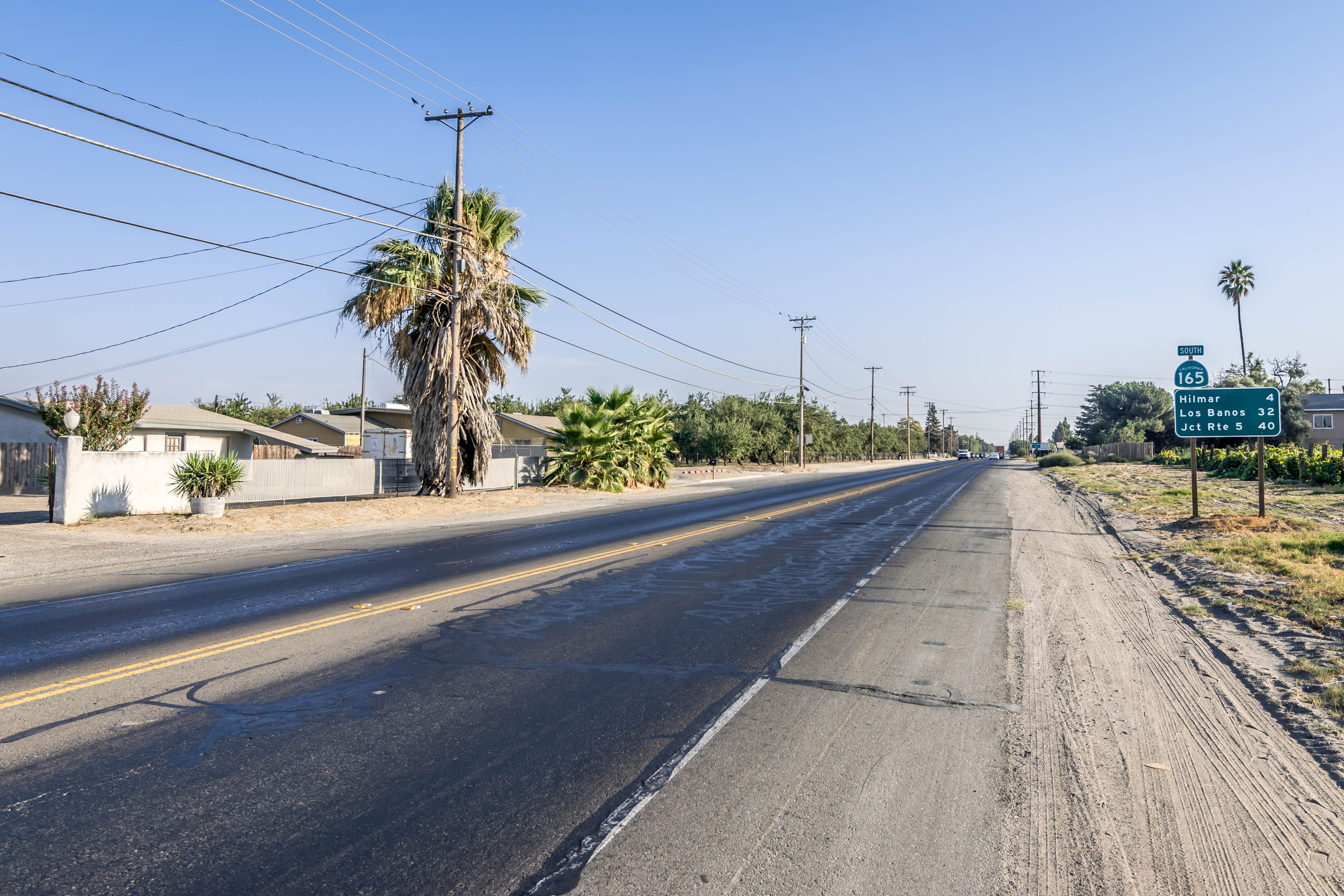
SR 165 in Turlock

Route 165 is defined in section 465 of the California Streets and Highways Code, and that the highway is "from Route 5 south of Los Banos to Route 99 near Turlock".

State Route 165 begins at the junction of Interstate 5 south of Los Banos and heads north on a rural two-lane highway known as Mercey Springs Road. The highway crosses the California Aqueduct north of Interstate 5 and enters Los Banos several miles later. It meets up with SR 152 and SR 33, known locally as Pacheco Boulevard. After leaving Los Banos, the highway then runs right through the San Luis National Wildlife Refuge and skirts the Great Valley Grasslands State Park to the west while crossing the San Joaquin River. At this point, the highway is known as Lander Avenue and meets up with SR 140 near Stevinson. It crosses the Merced River en route to Hilmar, then crosses into Stanislaus County for a short while, ending at SR 99 in Turlock.

SR 165 in Los Banos is part of the National Highway System, a network of highways that are considered essential to the country's economy, defense, and mobility by the Federal Highway Administration.

== Major intersections ==
Except where prefixed with a letter, postmiles were measured on the road as it was in 1964, based on the alignment that existed at the time, and do not necessarily reflect current mileage. Postmile prefixes include: R reflecting a realignment in the route since then, M indicating a second realignment, L referring to an overlap due to a correction or change, and T indicating postmiles classified as temporary. Segments that remain unconstructed or have been relinquished to local control may be omitted. The numbers reset at county lines; the start and end postmiles in each county are given in the county column.

| County | Location | Postmile | Destinations | Notes |
|---|---|---|---|---|
| Merced; MER L0.00-36.72 | | L0.00 | I-5 (West Side Freeway) – Sacramento, Los Angeles | Interchange; south end of SR 165; I-5 exit 391 |
| Merced; MER L0.00-36.72 | Los Banos | 8.79 | SR 152 / SR 33 (Pacheco Boulevard) to I-5 north – Gilroy, Fresno | Serves Sutter Health – Memorial Hospital Los Banos |
| Merced; MER L0.00-36.72 | | 26.87 | SR 140 – Merced, Gustine | |
| Merced; MER L0.00-36.72 | | 30.18 | CR J18 east (West Side Boulevard) | South end of CR J18 overlap |
| Merced; MER L0.00-36.72 | | 30.18 | CR J18 west (River Road) | North end of CR J18 overlap |
| Merced; MER L0.00-36.72 | Hilmar | 33.37 | Bloss Avenue – Livingston, Merced | |
| Merced; MER L0.00-36.72 | | 36.45 | Bradbury Road | |
| Stanislaus; STA 0.00-1.55 | Turlock | 1.55 | SR 99 – Sacramento, Los Angeles | Interchange; north end of SR 165; southern terminus of CR J14; SR 99 exit 211 |
| Stanislaus; STA 0.00-1.55 | Turlock | 1.55 | CR J14 (Lander Avenue) | Continuation beyond SR 99; serves Emanuel Medical Center |
1.000 mi = 1.609 km; 1.000 km = 0.621 mi: Concurrency terminus
