= The Union Hotel, La Porte, California =

Coordinates: 39.68252°N 120.98461°W

The Union Hotel was established by the Cayot Family in La Porte, California in 1855. Originally known as the Hotel de France or The French Hotel, it was renamed in 1860 in honor of local Union soldiers. The Cayot Family owned the hotel until 1968 when it was sold to Harold Thrash.

The original structure was destroyed by fire, and rebuilt in 1906. The only surviving structural element is the brick safe which stands at the center of the hotel.

== See also ==
- Claire Cayot O'Rourke
- Plumas National Forest
