= Charlotte Ah Tye Chang =

American social worker and community activist

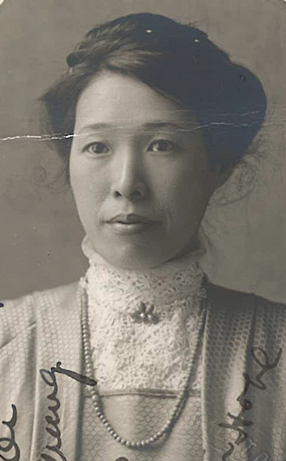
- Charlotte Ah Tye Chang, from a 1910 photograph in the files of the National Archives.
- Born: Charlotte Ah Tye; July 21, 1873; La Porte, California, U.S.
- Died: January 15, 1972 (aged 98); Berkeley, California, U.S.
- Occupation(s): Social worker, activist
- Spouse: Hong Yen Chang (m. 1897)
- Children: 2

Charlotte Chang (née Ah Tye; July 21, 1873 – January 15, 1972) was an American social worker and community activist in the San Francisco area. As a California-born Chinese-American woman, her citizenship status became complicated after she married a Chinese-born lawyer, Hong Yen Chang, in 1897. Later in life, she protested the demolition of the Kong Chow Temple in San Francisco's Chinatown.

== Early life ==
Charlotte Ah Tye was born in La Porte, California, the daughter of a merchant, Yee Ah Tye, and his wife, Chan Shi Ah Tye. Both of her parents were born in Guangdong, China. She and her sister Alice were partly educated at a Hong Kong English school.

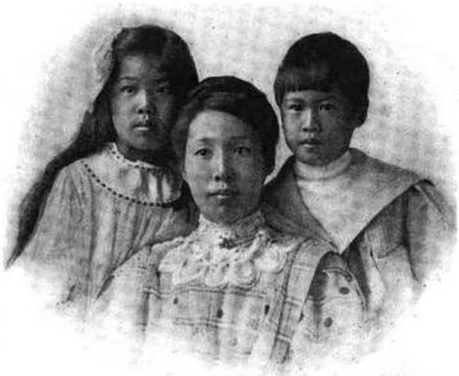
Charlotte Ah Tye Chang and her children, Ora and Oliver, from a 1909 publication.

== Citizenship and work in California ==
Charlotte Ah Tye married Chinese-born lawyer Hong Yen Chang in 1897, in San Francisco. They had two children, Ora Ivy Chang (1898-1929) and Oliver Carrington Chang (1900-1973). In 1906, Charlotte Chang and her two children survived the great San Francisco earthquake, staying with friends and helping with church relief efforts in Oakland.

American women lost their United States citizenship when they married foreign nationals, before the Cable Act of 1922. In 1910, planning to travel from San Francisco to Vancouver, Charlotte Ah Tye Chang and her children applied for return certificates but were refused; although they were all born in California, they could not claim United States citizenship. The family lived in Vancouver from 1910 to 1913 while Hong Yen Chang was a diplomat at the Chinese consulate there, in Washington in 1913 and 1914, and in Berkeley from 1916.

In widowhood, Charlotte Chang worked at the Oakland International Institute branch of the YWCA as a "nationality worker", from 1928 into the 1930s. She is considered one of the first Chinese-American social workers in the San Francisco. She also volunteered at the Oak Knoll Naval Hospital. She applied again to have her American citizenship reinstated in 1935.

== Kong Chow Temple ==
In 1968 and 1969, while in her nineties, Chang led protests against plans to demolish the old Kong Chow Temple, established on the land her father donated in 1854 for the purpose. Her niece, artist Nanying Stella Wong, joined in her efforts. The temple was ultimately demolished; Chang did not live to see the new Kong Chow Temple erected at another location in 1977.

== Personal life ==
Charlotte Ah-Tye Chang was widowed when Hong Yen Chang died in 1926. Her daughter died in a car accident in 1929. Charlotte Chang died in Berkeley in 1972, aged 98 years. Her gravesite is in Oakland. The Hong Yen Chang papers at the Huntington Library include photographs and correspondence of Charlotte Ah Tye Chang, including her letters from Soong Ching-ling, wife of Sun Yat-Sen.
