= Gustine High School =

Public school in California, United States

Location
- 501 North Avenue; Gustine, Merced, California 95322; United States; 37.260908°N 121.001261°W

Information
- School type: Public High School
- School district: Gustine Unified School District
- NCES School ID: 02033
- Principal: Adam Cano
- Teaching staff: 29.63 (FTE)
- Grades: 9-12
- Enrollment: 553 (2023–2024)
- Student to teacher ratio: 18.66
- Color
- Mascot: Reds
- Team name: Reds
- Website: ghs.gustineusd.org

Gustine High School is a public high school in Gustine, California, United States. Gustine High School was established in 1913. Gustine High School includes a variety of about 20 clubs and 13 sports.
