= Glenview, California =

Glenview, California may refer to the following places in the United States:

- Glenview, Los Angeles County, California, a place in California
- Glenview, Oakland, California
- Glenview, San Diego County, California, a place in California
