= Ferguson landslide =

Landslide in Mariposa County, California

Coordinates: 37°39′24″N 119°54′3″W

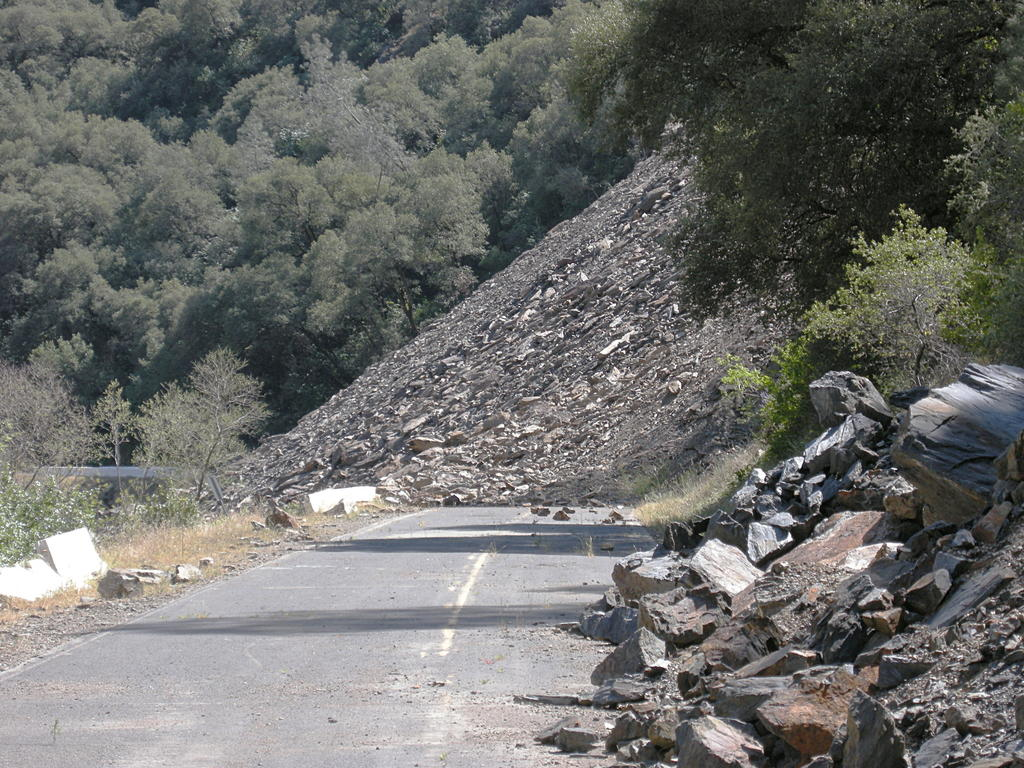
Ferguson Slide

The Ferguson landslide, also commonly called the Ferguson Slide, is an active landslide in the Merced River canyon in Mariposa County, California, United States. In 2006, rocks and debris slid off Ferguson Ridge, blocking California State Route 140, a primary access road to Yosemite National Park. The slide still blocked the original road as of November 2026, although temporary bridges allow one-way traffic around the slide and into the park. The slide is a natural phenomenon, and resulted from the erosion dynamics of the river valley.

== History ==
The slide began on April 29, 2006, and initially the highway remained open, with active monitoring and occasional temporary closures. By May 28, the road was closed permanently, blocking access to the park from the town of Mariposa and severely impacting the local economy. Many park employees reside in Mariposa, and for several months a two-hour trip (one way) was required to get to work in the park. Revenue from the local hospitality industry dropped extensively, including wages, profits to small business owners, and county government income from occupancy taxes. A state of emergency was declared in June 2006 for Mariposa County.

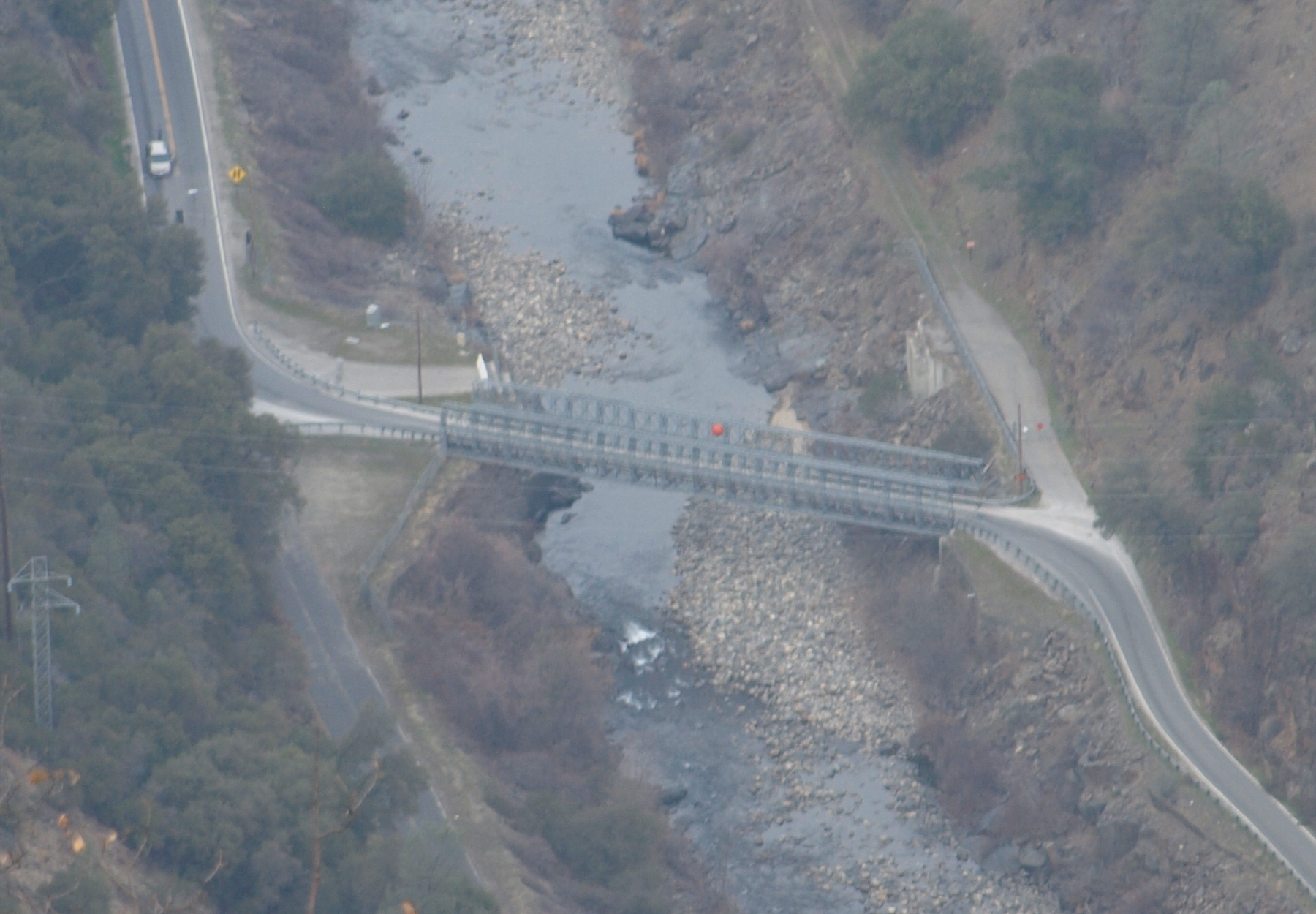
The downstream temporary bridge

Initially, two temporary bridges were built in August 2006. While this detour alleviated a significant portion of the economic impact to the area, vehicles over 28 feet could not use it. In June 2008, new temporary bridges which could accommodate longer vehicles were constructed. The detour via the bridges is one-way, controlled by traffic lights. At the height of the tourist season, this has sometimes resulted in significant delays. The temporary bridges access a road grade on the north side of the Merced River, which is a vestige of the Yosemite Valley Railroad.

Repair of the highway was on permanent hold due to the encroachment of an endangered species into the slide area. In 2012, Assemblymember Kristin Olsen authored legislation that would allow the California Department of Fish and Game to do an initial take of the limestone salamander and place it in an ecological reserve. The legislation paved the way to restoring this important access route to Yosemite. Known officially as Assembly Bill No. 1973, it passed both houses of the California State Legislature and was signed into law by Gov. Governor Jerry Brown on July 13, 2012. After considering the option of a tunnel, Caltrans settled on a rock shed design in 2014.

=== Ferguson Rock Shed ===
Caltrans plans to restore the original route of Highway 140 by building a protective rock shed, with construction split into two distinct projects:

- Phase 1: Removing the existing talus material (approx. 320,000 tons) and installing cable drapery to minimize additional rock fall. Work began in early 2021.
- Phase 2: Constructing a 675-foot (206 m) rock shed structure on the same alignment.

Construction on the rock shed is expected to begin in Summer 2025 and last five years. Estimate construction cost – $285,000,000 (Delivered through one contract). Construction has been delayed because slide talus material continues to fall and this requires continued removal. Material continues to fall as of July 2024.
