= Stanley Piltz =

American photographer and graphic designer

Stanley A. Piltz
- Born: Stanley Adolf Piltz; November 24, 1887; San Pedro, California, US
- Died: January 16, 1973 (aged 85); San Francisco, California, U.S.
- Occupations: Photographer and Publisher
- Spouse: Ruth Piltz

Stanley A. Piltz (November 24, 1887 – January 16, 1973) was an American photographer and publisher of Mid-Century Modern graphic design and printed ephemera. Stanley A. Piltz Company, San Francisco, issued many Linen Type postcards from the 1930s to the 1950s, depicting scenes of California, especially of the San Francisco Bay Area and the 1939 Golden Gate International Exposition. They consisted primarily of scenic views, city, town, civil and military infrastructures and national monuments views. Linen Type postcards were produced on paper with a high rag content which gave the postcard a fabric type look and feel. At the time, this was an inexpensive process. Along with advances in printing technique, linen type cards allowed for vibrant ink colors. Stanley Piltz pioneered the Linen Type postcards with his "Pictorial Wonderland Art Tone Series".

Curt Teich was the most prominent and largest printer and publisher of Linen Type postcards, based in Chicago. Stanley Piltz was one of the most prominent publishers on the West Coast. Curt Teich printed most of the Linen Type postcards for Piltz utilizing Teich's "C.T. Art-Colortone" printing method. Other publishers in California include Burton Frasher in Pomona, Western Publishing and Novelty Company, Tichnor Art Company in Los Angeles, B. W. White in Monterey and Stephen H. Willard in Palm Springs.
