= Hong Yen Chang =

American lawyer

- 張康仁
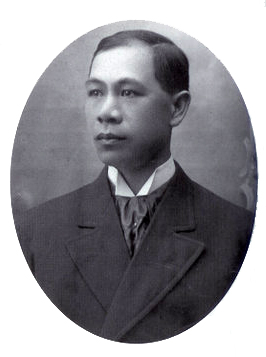
- Born: 1859 or 1860; Guangdong, China
- Died: August 4, 1926; Berkeley, California, United States
- Education: Yale University; Columbia University (LLB)
- Spouse: Charlotte Ah Tye Chang

Hong Yen Chang (Note: Alternate names and variant spellings: Chang Hon Yen, Zhang Kangren, Kang Jen Chang, Chang Kang-jen, Chang Hong Yin, and Harry Chang.) (張康仁; 1859 or 1860 - August 4, 1926) was reportedly the first Chinese immigrant licensed to practice law in the United States. Though admitted to the New York State Bar, he was denied admission to the California State Bar in 1890. He remained a prominent member of the Chinese community and went on to lead a distinguished career in banking and diplomacy.

== Early life ==
Chang was born in 1860, in what is now Guangdong, China (though records from Yale list his birth date as December 20, 1859). Chang's father died when he was 10 years old.

=== Chinese Educational Mission ===
In 1872, Chang was selected to travel to the United States as part of the Chinese Educational Mission. He arrived in the United States at thirteen years old and lived with American families. Chang attended Hartford Public High School in Connecticut from 1876 to 1878. Beginning in 1878, Chang studied in a college preparatory program at the Phillips Academy in Andover, Massachusetts. Chang graduated from the Phillips Academy in 1879, giving an English oration at his commencement ceremony titled "The Influence of Greece beyond Greece."

In 1879, Chang began studies at Yale College (now Yale University). In 1881, however, the Chinese government recalled the Chinese Educational Mission students back to China.

== Legal studies and career ==
Hong Yen Chang did not remain in China for long, though. He returned to the United States on his own accord and began studies at Columbia Law School in 1883. He graduated with honors from Columbia Law School in 1886. He received "high markings from the examiners" and had unanimous recommendation for bar admission.

At the time of Hong Yen Chang's graduation, the New York State Bar required applicants to be United States citizens. But the Chinese Exclusion Act barred Hong Yen Chang from citizenship. The New York Supreme Court, General Term, initially opposed Hong Yen Chang's admission to the New York State Bar. (Prior to their decision, Hong Yen Chang was already naturalized by Judge Van Hossen on November 11, 1887, in New York.) However, the New York State Legislature passed an act that allowed Hong Yen Chang to apply again to the bar. The act, "An Act for the relief of Hong Yen Chang," reads:

Section 1. The General Term of the first department of the supreme court of this State is hereby authorized to waive the alienage of Hong Yen Chang, a native of China, but now a resident of the city, county and State of New York, and to regularly admit and license him to the practice as an attorney and counselor at law in all the courts of this State, on his passing in a satisfactory manner the usual examination for the admission of attorneys and counselors.

The New York Supreme Court, General Term admitted Chang to the New York State Bar on May 17, 1888. The New York Times hailed him as the first admitted Chinese lawyer in the United States. In 1889, Chang also became the first Chinese lawyer admitted to the Hawaii State Bar Association.

== In re Hong Yen Chang ==
Soon after Chang's admission to the New York State Bar, Chang moved West to California and sought admission to the California State Bar. His motion to practice law in California reached the California Supreme Court in 1890. Under the California Code of Civil Procedure at the time, "Every citizen of the United States . . . who has been admitted to practice law in the highest court of a sister state . . . may be admitted to practice in the courts of this State upon the production of his license and satisfactory evidence of good character; but the court may examine the applicant as to his character." In support of his eligibility to practice law in California, Chang submitted his license to practice law in New York and "a certificate of naturalization, issued by the court of common pleas of the city of New York, November 11, 1887." The state Supreme Court denied his motion to practice law in California, finding the naturalization certificate issued by New York invalid under the Chinese Exclusion Act. The court held:

We are, therefore, of opinion that the certificate of naturalization presented in this case was issued without authority of law, and is void, it being conceded that the holder of it is a person of Mongolian [sic] nativity.

In 2011, members of the U.C. Davis Asian Pacific American Law Students Association, with the assistance and supervision of professor Gabriel Chin, petitioned the Supreme Court of California to grant Chang posthumous admission to the State Bar of California. On March 16, 2015 the Court granted that petition.

[I]t is past time to acknowledge that the discriminatory exclusion of Chang from the State Bar of California was a grievous wrong. It denied Chang equal protection of the laws; apart from his citizenship, he was by all accounts qualified for admission to the bar. It was also a blow to countless others who, like Chang, aspired to become a lawyer only to have their dream deferred on account of their race, alienage, or nationality. And it was a loss to our communities and to society as a whole, which denied itself the full talents of its people and the important benefits of a diverse legal profession. More than a century later, Chang's descendants and the Asian Pacific American Law Students Association at the University of California, Davis School of Law have sought to right this wrong. Even if we cannot undo history, we can acknowledge it and, in so doing, accord a full measure of recognition to Chang's pathbreaking efforts to become the first lawyer of Chinese descent in the United States. The people and the courts of California were denied Chang's services as a lawyer. But we need not be denied his example as a pioneer for a more inclusive legal profession. In granting Chang posthumous admission to the California Bar, we affirm his rightful place among the ranks of persons deemed qualified to serve as an attorney and counselor at law in the courts of California.

== Later life ==
Chang married Charlotte Ah Tye on March 14, 1897, in San Francisco.

Between 1888 and 1895, Chang worked for the Chinese Consulate in San Francisco as an advisor. He then worked for the Yokohama Specie Bank of Japan in San Francisco.

In 1907, Chang left San Francisco and returned to China. Chang became the Accountant-General to the Treasury's Shanghai branch. Around the same time, he was appointed to a chair at University of Nanking to teach international law and banking. (Another source, however, notes that Hong Yen Chang taught at Tientsin University.)

In 1908, Chang became a diplomat, participating first in a Special Mission to the United States, and then serving the Chinese Legation in Washington, D.C. Between 1910 and 1913, he served as the Chinese Consul in Vancouver, British Columbia. The Chinese government awarded him a doctorate of law for his services. Hong Yen Chang held other prestigious positions, including Director of Chinese naval students at Berkeley, California, until his retirement in 1920.

Chang died on August 4, 1926, in Berkeley, California.

== Legacy ==
Hong Yen Chang Center for Chinese Legal Studies at Columbia Law School in New York City began operation January 1, 2021. His great-grandniece, Rachelle B. Chong, was the first Asian-American to serve as a member of the Federal Communications Commission (FCC).

== See also ==
- List of first minority male lawyers and judges in New York
