= Planada, California =

- Census-designated place
- Location in Merced County and the state of California

- Location in the United States
- Coordinates: 37°17′N 120°19′W
- Country: United States
- State: California
- County: Merced

Area
  - Total: 1.742 sq mi (4.512 km^{2})
  - Land: 1.742 sq mi (4.512 km^{2})
  - Water: 0 sq mi (0 km^{2}) 0%
- Elevation: 226 ft (69 m)

Population (2020)
  - Total: 4,164
  - Density: 2,390/sq mi (922.9/km^{2})
- Time zone: UTC-8 (Pacific)
  - Summer (DST): UTC-7 (PDT)
- ZIP code: 95365
- Area code: 209
- FIPS code: 06-57582
- GNIS feature ID: 1659784

Planada (Spanish for "Plain") is a census-designated place (CDP) in Merced County, California, United States. Planada is 9 miles (14 km) east of Merced, the county seat, at an elevation of 226 feet (69 m). The population was 4,164 at the 2020 census, down from 4,584 at the 2010 census.

== History ==
Planada was originally named Whitton by railroad officials. The area's first white settlers were a group of Swiss dairy farmers, who renamed the settlement Geneva. The Geneva post office opened in 1896, closed in 1897, then reopened in 1898. In 1911, it held a contest to select a new name for the town, and Planada was the winning entry. The San Francisco and San Joaquin Valley Railroad (built in the late 1890s) had a "Geneva" station which became the "Planada" station.

Since many of Planada's residents - as many as 41 percent - are undocumented, they were ineligible for most federal aid. In July, the state legislature passed a bill to provide assistance to Planada residents.

== Geography ==
Planada is located in eastern Merced County at 37°17′N 120°19′W, in California's Central Valley. California State Route 140 passes through the community, leading west 9 miles (14 km) to Merced and northeast 28 miles (45 km) to Mariposa in the foothills of the Sierra Nevada.

According to the United States Census Bureau, the Planada CDP has a total area of 1.7 square miles (4.4 km^{2}), all land.

=== Climate ===
According to the Köppen Climate Classification system, Planada has a warm-summer Mediterranean climate, abbreviated "Csa" on climate maps.

== Demographics ==
Historical population
Census	Pop.	Note	%±
1960	1,704		—
1970	2,056		20.7%
1980	2,406		17.0%
1990	3,531		46.8%
2000	4,369		23.7%
2010	4,584		4.9%
2020	4,164		−9.2%
U.S. Decennial Census; 1860–1870 1880-1890; 1900 1910 1920; 1930 1940 1950; 1960 1970 1980; 1990 2000 2010

=== 2020 census ===
As of the 2020 census, Planada had a population of 4,164 and a population density of 2,390.4 inhabitants per square mile (922.9/km^{2}). The median age was 32.2 years. The age distribution was 30.0% under 18, 10.5% from 18 to 24, 26.8% from 25 to 44, 22.2% from 45 to 64, and 10.5% who were 65 or older. For every 100 females, there were 100.5 males, and for every 100 females age 18 and over, there were 100.8 males. 0.0% of residents lived in urban areas, while 100.0% lived in rural areas.

The whole population lived in households. There were 1,150 households, out of which 49.2% had children under the age of 18. Of all households, 57.3% were married-couple households, 6.7% were cohabiting couple households, 22.4% had a female householder with no spouse or partner present, and 13.6% had a male householder with no spouse or partner present. About 11.3% of households were one person, and 5.9% were one person aged 65 or older. The average household size was 3.62. There were 979 families (85.1% of all households).

There were 1,175 housing units at an average density of 674.5 units per square mile (260.4 units/km^{2}), of which 1,150 (97.9%) were occupied. Of the occupied units, 58.3% were owner-occupied and 41.7% were renter-occupied. 2.1% of housing units were vacant. The homeowner vacancy rate was 0.0% and the rental vacancy rate was 3.2%.

Racial composition as of the 2020 census
Race	Number	Percent
White	996	23.9%
Black or African American	59	1.4%
American Indian and Alaska Native	106	2.5%
Asian	33	0.8%
Native Hawaiian and Other Pacific Islander	14	0.3%
Some other race	2,026	48.7%
Two or more races	930	22.3%
Hispanic or Latino (of any race)	3,858	92.7%

=== Income and poverty ===
In 2023, the US Census Bureau estimated that the median household income was $45,588, and the per capita income was $21,118. About 21.3% of families and 26.5% of the population were below the poverty line.

=== 2010 census ===
At the 2010 census Planada had a population of 4,584. The population density was 2,906.6 inhabitants per square mile (1,122.2/km^{2}). The racial makeup of Planada was 1,681 (36.7%) White, 22 (0.5%) African American, 23 (0.5%) Native American, 46 (1.0%) Asian, 1 (0.0%) Pacific Islander, 2,725 (59.4%) from other races, and 86 (1.9%) from two or more races. Hispanic or Latino of any race were 4,347 persons (94.8%).

The whole population lived in households, no one lived in non-institutionalized group quarters and no one was institutionalized.

There were 1,115 households, 675 (60.5%) had children under the age of 18 living in them, 737 (66.1%) were opposite-sex married couples living together, 154 (13.8%) had a female householder with no husband present, 111 (10.0%) had a male householder with no wife present. There were 45 (4.0%) unmarried opposite-sex partnerships, and 9 (0.8%) same-sex married couples or partnerships. 95 households (8.5%) were one person and 35 (3.1%) had someone living alone who was 65 or older. The average household size was 4.11. There were 1,002 families (89.9% of households); the average family size was 4.30.

The age distribution was 1,552 people (33.9%) under the age of 18, 588 people (12.8%) aged 18 to 24, 1,201 people (26.2%) aged 25 to 44, 876 people (19.1%) aged 45 to 64, and 367 people (8.0%) who were 65 or older. The median age was 27.1 years. For every 100 females, there were 108.0 males. For every 100 females age 18 and over, there were 109.2 males.

There were 1,207 housing units at an average density of 765.3 per square mile, of the occupied units 649 (58.2%) were owner-occupied and 466 (41.8%) were rented. The homeowner vacancy rate was 3.4%; the rental vacancy rate was 7.3%. 2,638 people (57.5% of the population) lived in owner-occupied housing units and 1,946 people (42.5%) lived in rental housing units.

== Politics ==
In the California State Legislature, Planada is located in the 14th senatorial district, represented by Democrat Anna Caballero, and in the 27th Assembly district, represented by Democrat Esmeralda Soria.

In the United States House of Representatives, Planada is in California's 13th congressional district, represented by Democrat Adam Gray as of January 2025.

== Notable people ==
The ornithologist Rollo Beck died in Planada in 1950.
