= Glacier Lodge =

Campground in California

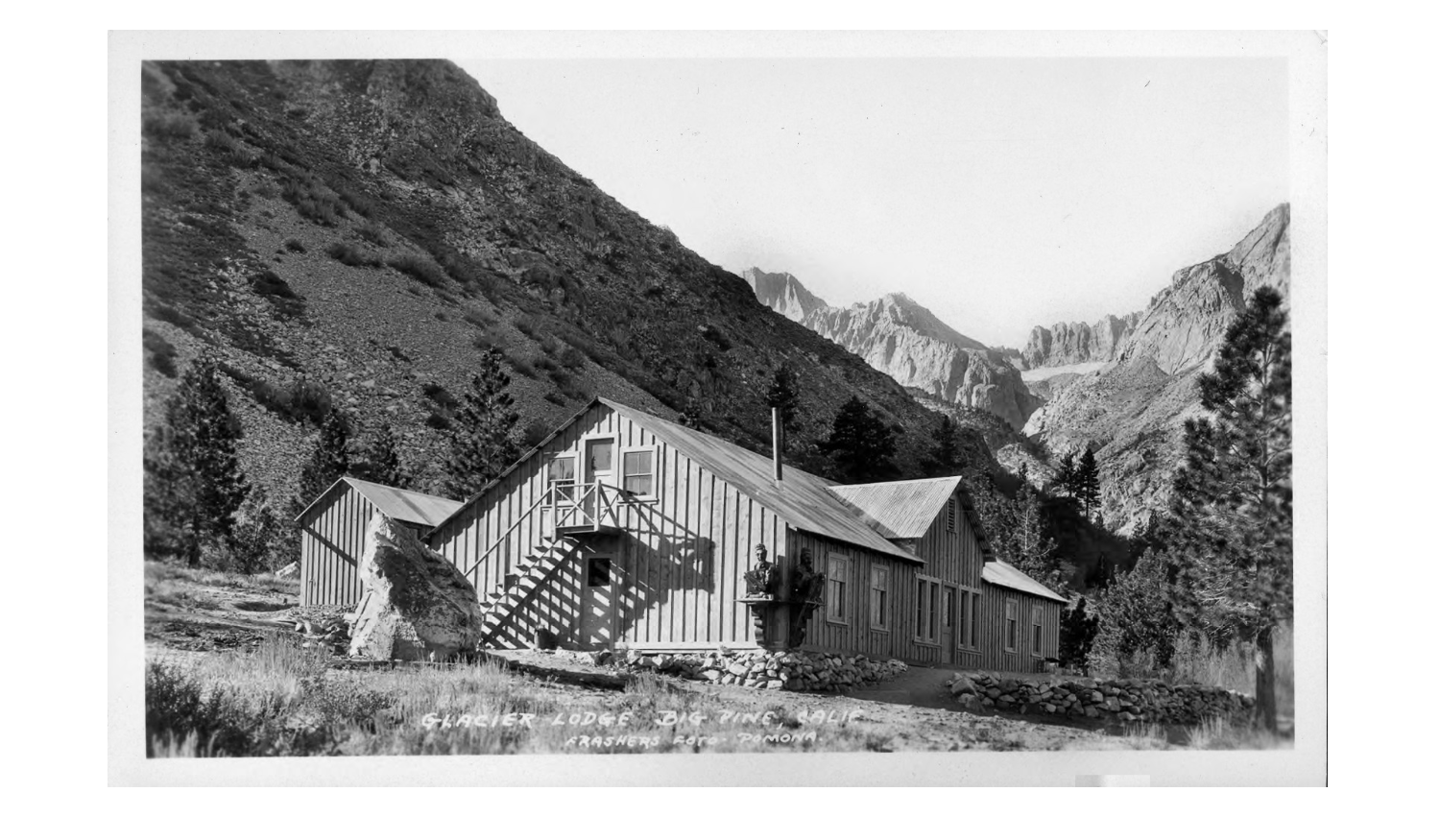
- The lodge in a 1926 photograph by Burton Frasher

- Location: 100 Glacier Lodge Rd, Big Pine, CA 93513
- Coordinates: 37.1241°N 118.4380°W
- Elevation: 8,000 ft (2,400 m)
- Owner: Darrin Pagenkopp
- Established: 1917
- Website: www.glacierlodge395.com

The Glacier Lodge is a campsite in Big Pine, California in the Sierra Nevada. It is located in Big Pine Canyon, below Kid Mountain. The area is popular with wilderness enthusiasts and offers fishing, camping, hiking, cycling, and other activities. Big Pine Creek runs alongside the road. It operates under a special use permit with the United States Forest Service.

== History ==
Established in 1917, Glacier Lodge originally was a small retreat where people, mostly locals could hike, fish, and hunt. It had a few cabins, a small hotel, and a dining hall. Middle Palisade Glacier and the Palisades could be seen from the camp. There was also a rocky ledge over Fourth Lake where some tents were maintained. The area and the camp were photographed many times by Burton Frasher and Harry Mendenhall in the 1920s and 30s. Painter Robert Clunie stayed in a tent near the campsite to paint every summer for forty years. For twenty years, Norman Clyde was the lodge's winter caretaker.

The campsite was improved during the Great Depression when a resident of Owens Valley who was associated with a lumberyard in the area used leftover wood to upgrade the area. They also enhanced the area over Fourth Lake, creating a smaller version there. Construction was tough on the workers, especially at the Fourth Lake, which was 6 mi (9.7 km) further out and 3,000 ft (910 m) taller. Builders had to use mules to transport materials. The Fourth Lake area was interchangeably called Fourth Lake Lodge, Upper Camp, Upper Lake, or Lake Lodge. Some of the site's cabins date from the 1932 Winter Olympics as they were sold around the country after the event ended.

The lodge's new main building was called Glacier Lodge and was popular during fishing in hunting seasons by 1946. Tourist brochures dubbed it the "Nearest High Sierra Resort to Southern California" and "The Site of the Famous Palisade Glacier. The campgrounds were powered by a small hydroelectric plant. In the 1940s, it was popular with the wealthy from Southern California due to its high price, $11 to $25 ($230 to $522 in 2022) a day. It expanded more during these times, adding telephone service, rowboats, and a warming hut.

Both lodges near the center of the campground were destroyed in the late 1960s, with the first burning down in 1967 while the second was blown up by gas trapped inside by an avalanche two years later. A few of the second lodge's beams were used in the new lodge that was built for the next season, which succumbed to a fire in 1998. As of 2009, no new lodge has been built since. The property was bought in 2018 by Darrin Pagenkopp. Kathy Huffman had previously owned it since 1998.

== Amenities ==
Due to the popularity of the nearby Alabama Hills with filming crews, many movie stars stayed at the campground. European tourists also stay here for its cheapness in comparison to other hotels or campsites. Guests are fed three meals a day and the site offers evening programs, guides, and horseback rides. At one point, a large general store also propped up at the camp. There is also a restaurant serving mountain-themed foods.

The campsite added a 1,000 ft (300 m) ski lift in the 1940s, along with other ski-related amenities such as a ski school, races, rentals, and tours for cross-country skiers. The road the lodge is on is popular with mountain bikers. Big Pine Creek, which runs near the camp, is stocked with rainbow trout by the California Department of Fish and Wildlife every three weeks.
