= Claire Cayot O'Rourke =

American politician

- Born: Claire Cayot; January 23, 1885; La Porte, California
- Died: June 26, 1996 (aged 111); Quincy, California
- Resting place: Whispering Pines Cemetery, Beckwourth, CA
- Title: Plumas County Treasurer (1949-?)
- Spouse: Leonard O'Rourke
- Children: Francis Leonard "Tim" O'Rourke (1906-1991)
- Parent(s): Frank and Claire Cayot

Claire Cayot O'Rourke (January 23, 1885 – June 26, 1996) was an American supercentenarian and the first woman to hold public office in the state of California. At 111 years of age, she was also one of the oldest Americans on record and the oldest known survivor of the 1906 San Francisco earthquake.

== Early life ==
O'Rourke was born in La Porte, California in 1885, the oldest of seven children born to French-born Francais "Frank" Cayot II and his wife Claire. The Cayot family owned and operated The Union Hotel, La Porte, California and Frank Cayot supplemented their income by handling the account books for a number of local mines and businesses.

The family was known for their sometimes controversial friendship with Chinese settlers. When, in 1886, the Miner's Anti-Chinese Association instigated a boycott of businesses which employed Chinese workers, Frank Cayot was added to the boycott list for employing a Chinese cook. Fortunately for the family, the local boycott proved ineffective because the hotel business depended primarily on income from stagecoach travel.

== Marriage and family ==
In 1905 she married Leonard O'Rourke and the couple moved to San Francisco. O'Rourke was eight months pregnant when the 1906 quake forced her to sleep for days in a tent in Golden Gate Park. She gave birth to son Francis Leonard "Tim" O'Rourke in Oakland the following month.

== County government ==
Soon after the birth of their son, the family returned to Plumas County, where Leonard was elected treasurer.

Following her husband's death in 1949, O'Rourke took over his job.

In 1955, during the height of a snow storm, O'Rourke was hit by a car while crossing Coburn Street at the corner of Main Street in Quincy, near the Plumas County Courthouse. She recovered and was elected three times in her own right before retiring in 1963 at the age of 78.

== Later life ==
Ms. O'Rourke later worked as receptionist at the county Social Security office until retiring for the final time in 1984 at age 99. There after, she remained active in volunteer and charity work, serving as treasurer of Quincy's Senior Citizen Nutrition Program.

She lived alone for 45 years after her husband's death, before moving into the Quincy retirement home, where she lived until her death in 1996.

== See also ==
- Oldest people
