= Rock shed =

Road protection structure

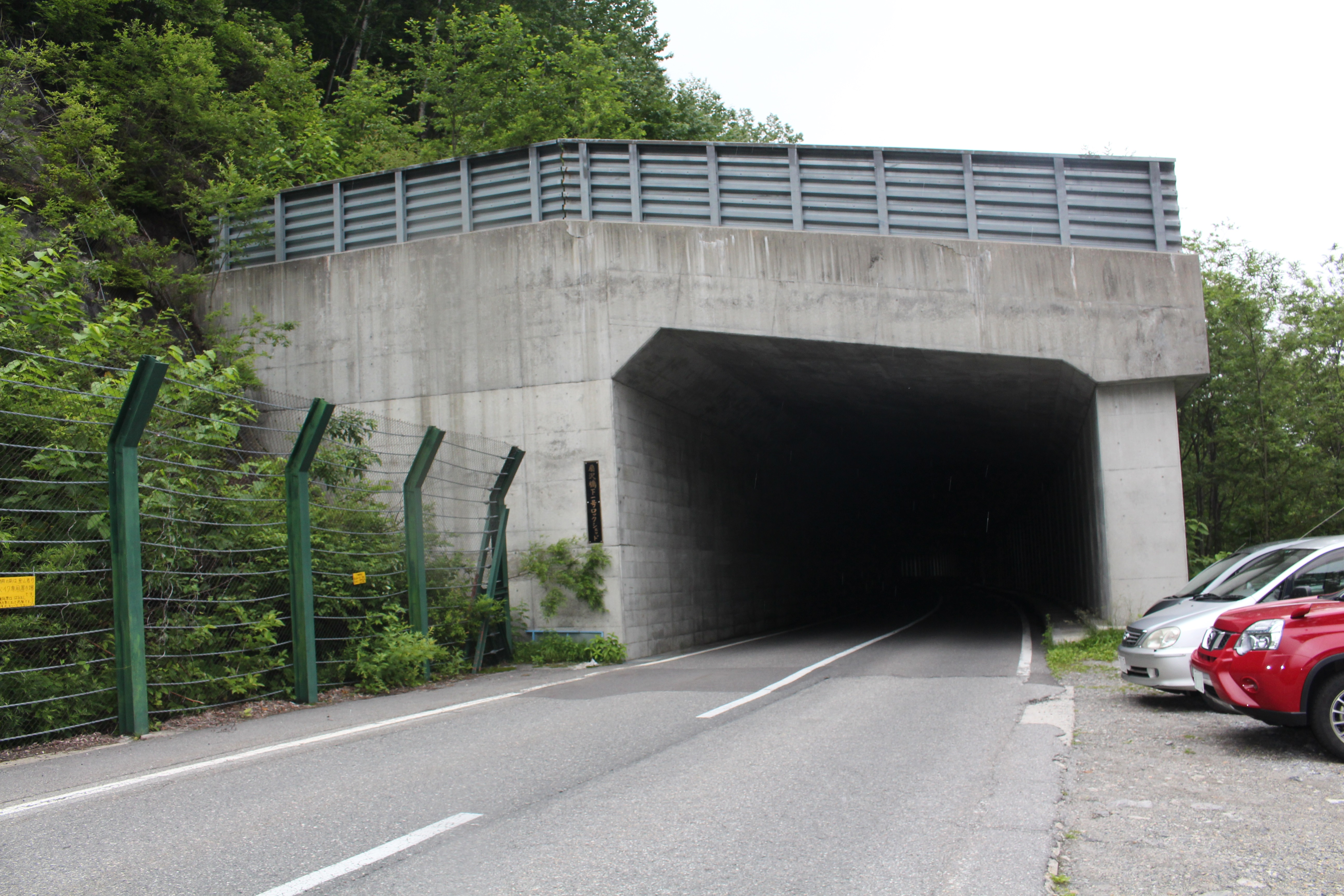
Rock shed on Nagano Prefectural Road, Japan

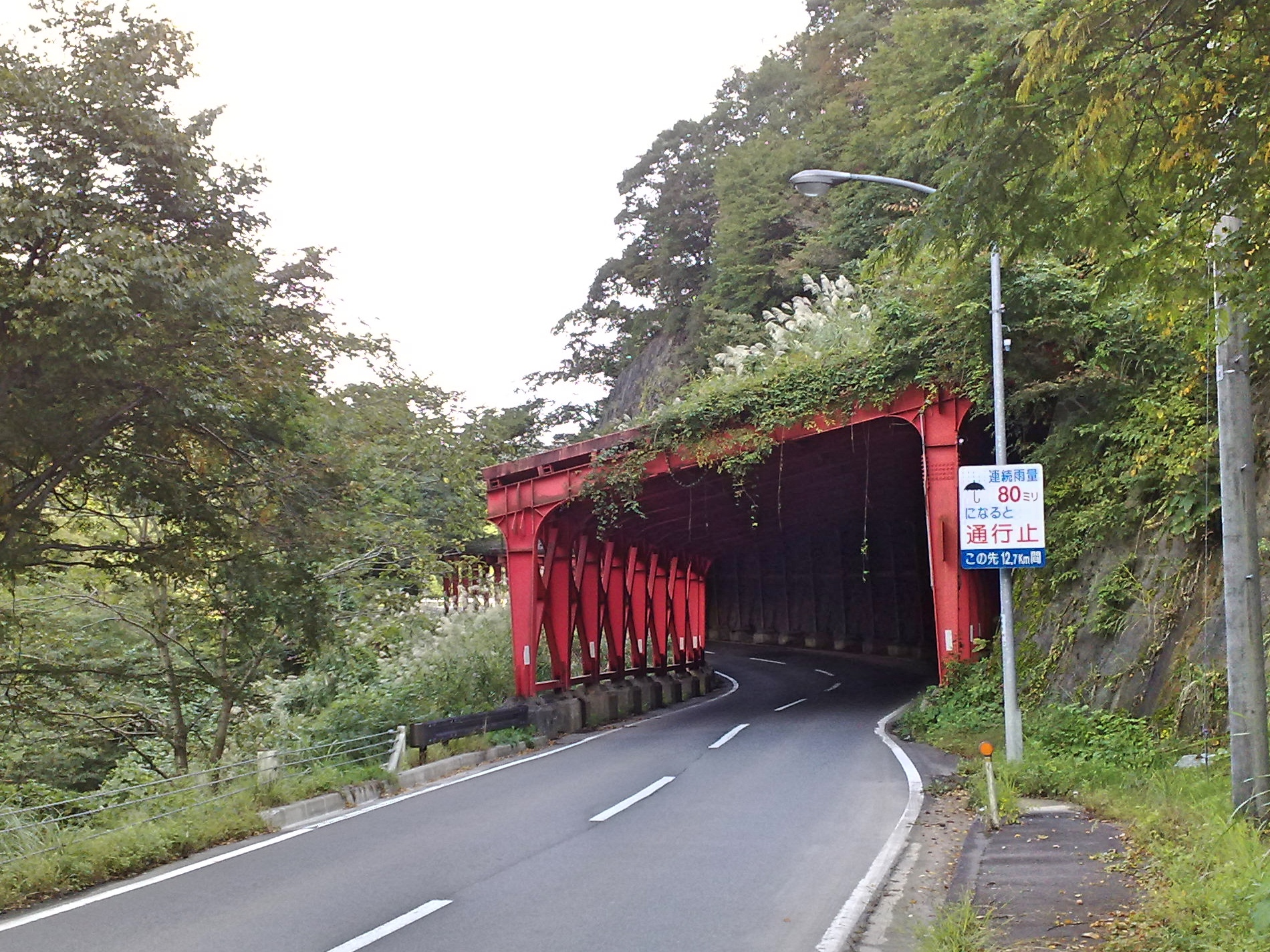
Rock shed on Niigata Prefectural Road, Japan

A rock shed is a civil engineering structure used in mountainous areas where rock slides and land slides create highway closure problems. A rock shed is built over a roadway that is in the path of the slide. They are also used to protect railroads. They are usually designed as a heavy reinforced concrete covering over the road, protecting the surface and vehicles from damage due to the falling rocks with a sloping surface to deflect slip material beyond the road, however an alternative is to include an impact-absorbing layer above the ceiling. A further use of this type of structure may be seen protecting the A4 road; although constructed primarily to alleviate risk from falling rocks from a limestone seam it also serves to protect against objects or persons falling from the Clifton Suspension Bridge where the height differential of approximately 70 metres from the bridge to the bottom of the Avon Gorge would give sufficient kinetic energy to even a relatively small item to cause injury on impact.

== Examples of rock sheds ==
- A4 road where it passes under the Clifton Suspension Bridge, Bristol, England, constructed in 1980
- California State Route 1 at Pitkins Curve, just north of Limekiln State Park, constructed in 2014
- Ferguson Rock Shed, to rectify a closure of California State Route 140 by a landslide in 2006, completion expected in the early-2030s
- Second East–West Highway, near the Perak-Pahang border, currently under construction.

== See also ==
- Avalanche dam
- Rock shelter
- Snow shed
