= California State Route 140 =

Highway in California

State Route 140
- SR 140 highlighted in red

Route information
- Maintained by Caltrans
- Length: 101.645 mi (163.582 km) SR 140 is broken into pieces, and the length does not reflect the overlaps that would be required to make the route continuous.
- Tourist routes: SR 140 between Mariposa and El Portal

Major junctions
- West end: I-5 near Gustine
- SR 33 in Gustine; SR 165 near Stevinson; SR 59 / SR 99 in Merced; SR 49 in Mariposa
- East end: Yosemite National Park

Location
- Country: United States
- State: California
- Counties: Merced, Mariposa

Highway system
- State highways in California; Interstate; US; State; Scenic; History; Pre‑1964; Unconstructed; Deleted; Freeways
← SR 139	→ SR 142

State Route 140 (SR 140) is an approximately 102-mile (164 km) state highway in the U.S. state of California. It begins in the San Joaquin Valley at Interstate 5 near Gustine, and runs east into the Sierra Nevada range, terminating in Yosemite National Park. Though maps and signs may show the highway extending east inside the park from its entrance to Yosemite Valley, this segment is federally maintained and is not included in the state route logs.

== Route description ==
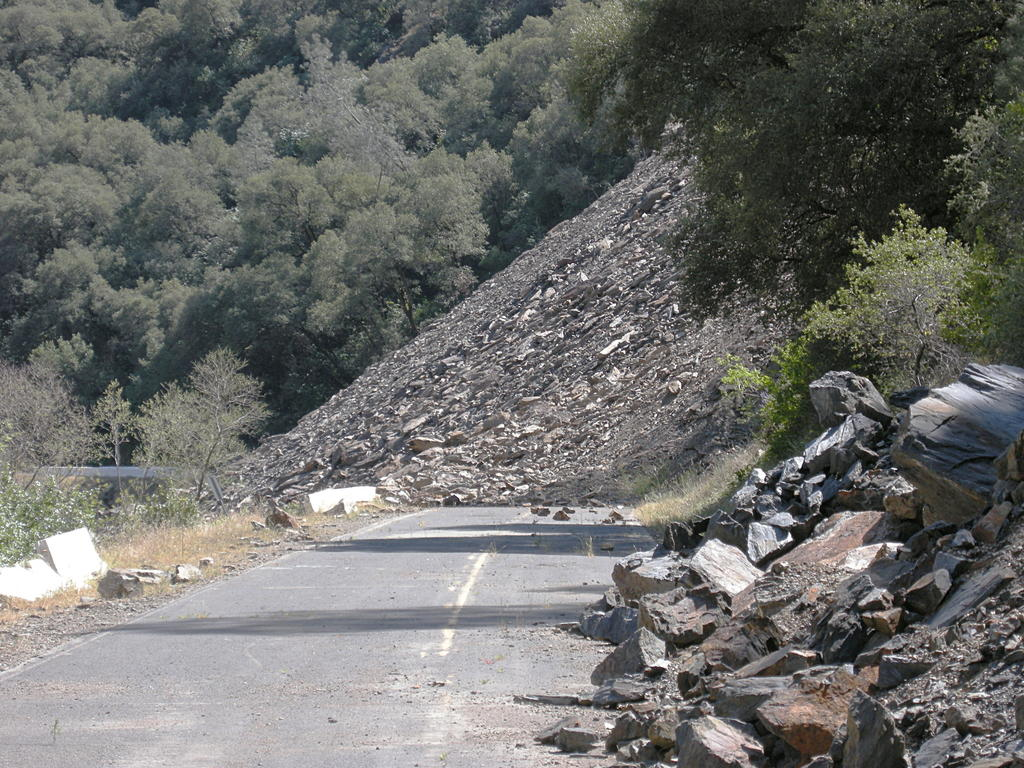
Ferguson Slide

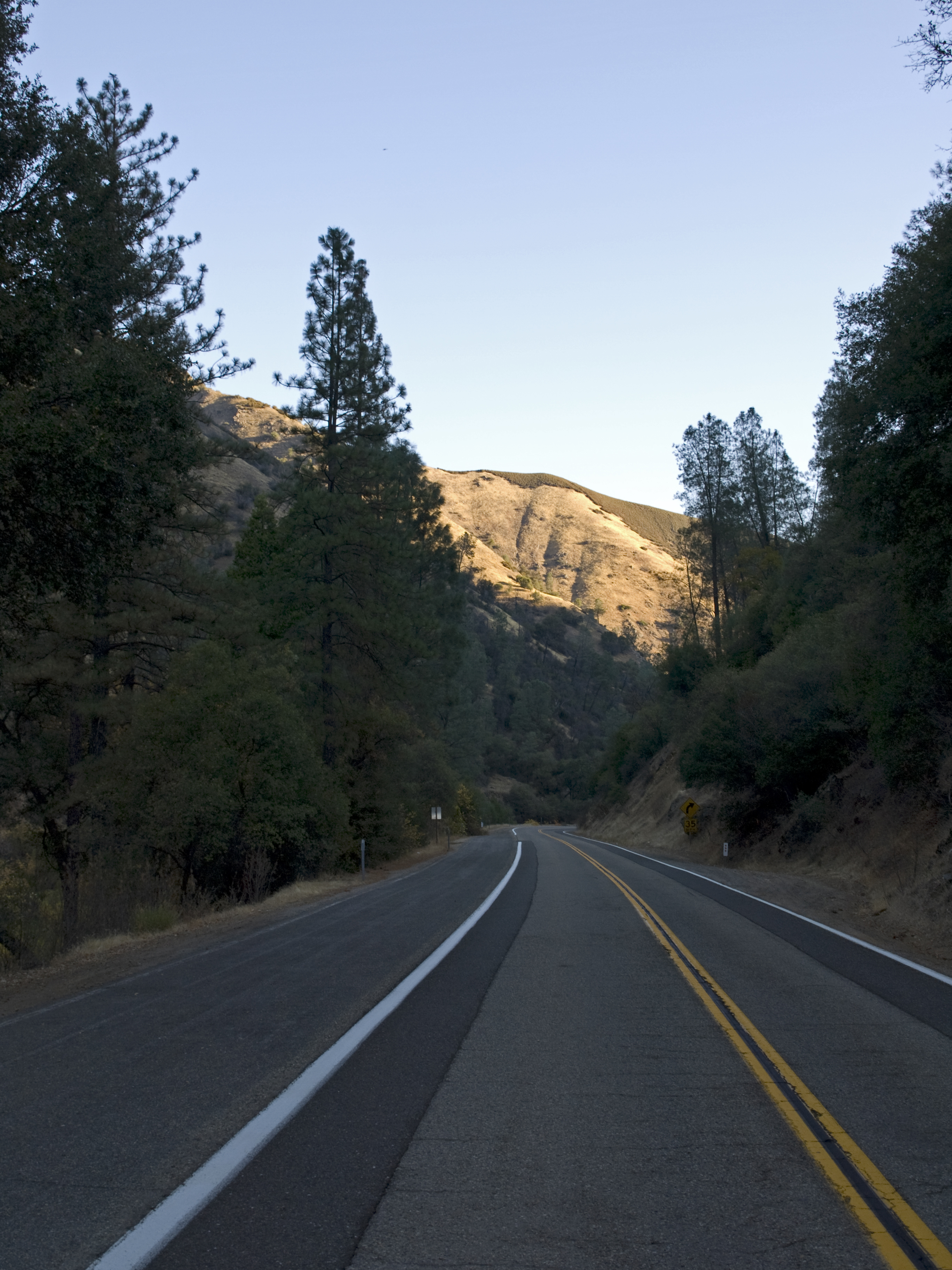
A stretch west of El Portal

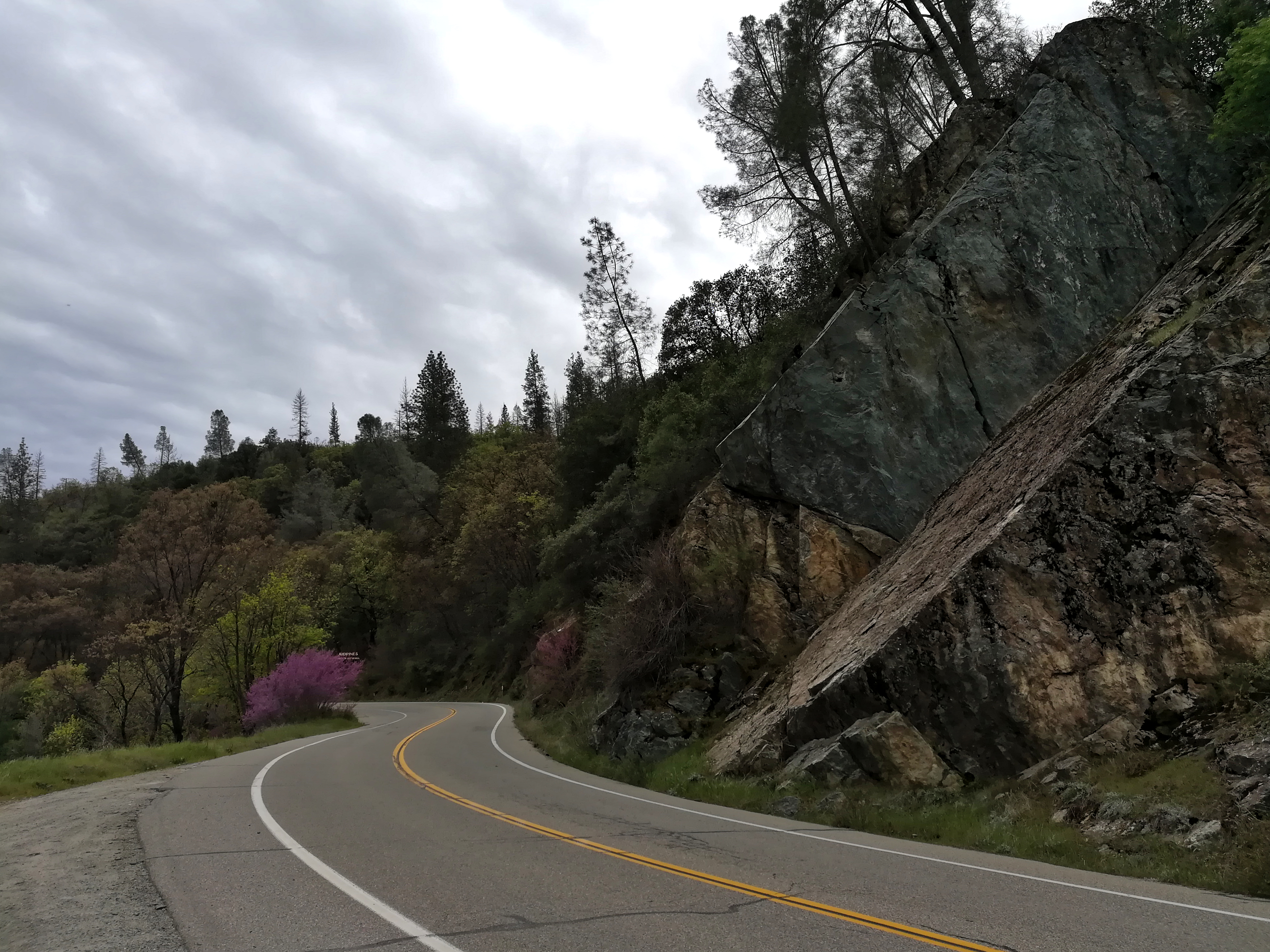
SR 140 between Midpines and Yosemite National Park

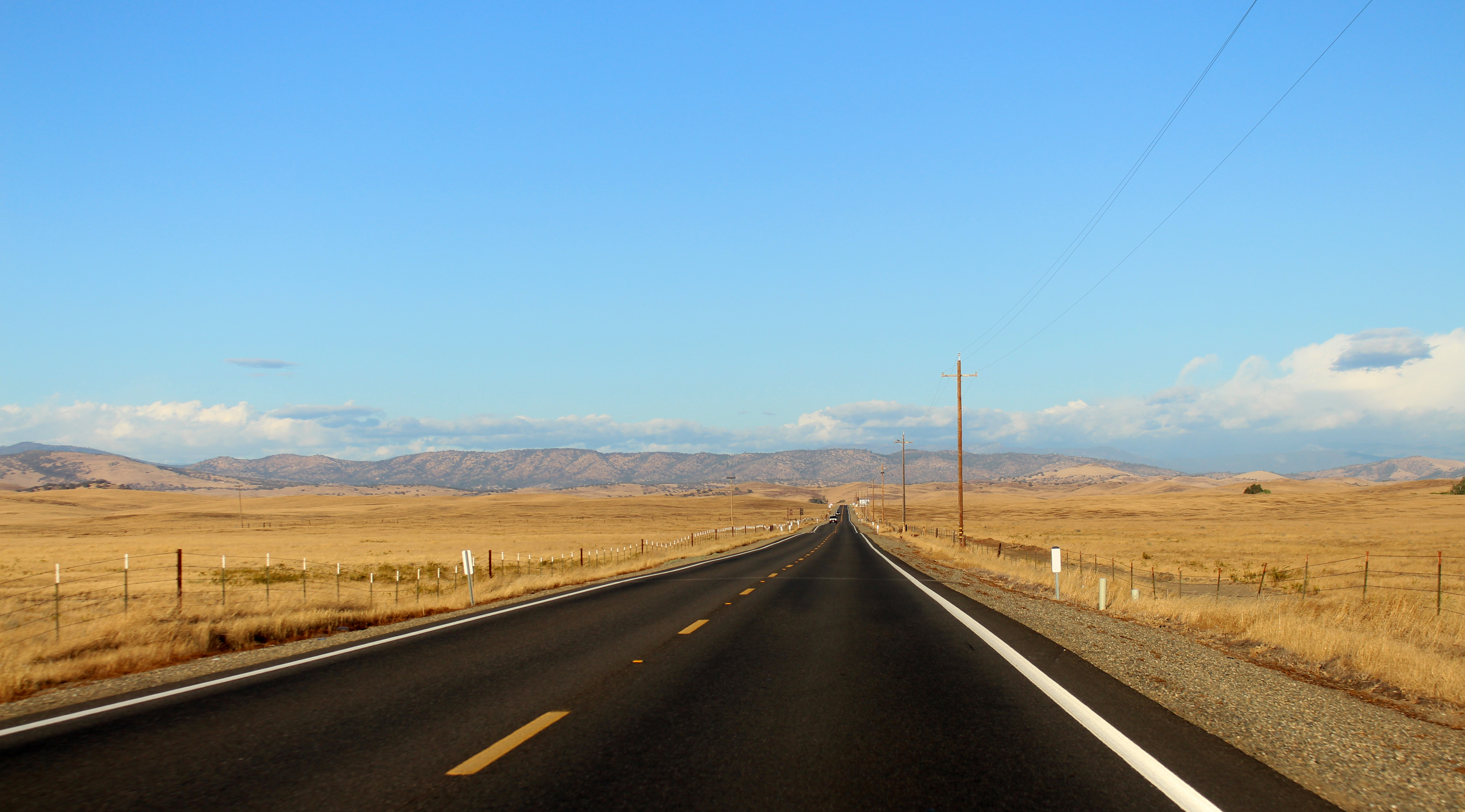
Eastbound SR 140 just east of Merced, California

Route 140 is defined in section 440 of the California Streets and Highways Code. The definition omits the concurrency with Route 99 instead of duplicating that segment in the other route's definition in the code:

Route 140 is from:
(a) Route 5 near Gustine to Route 99 near Merced.
(b) Route 99 near Merced to Yosemite National Park near El Portal via Mariposa.

Heading east from I-5, the highway passes Gustine; it then jogs to cross the San Joaquin River. It roughly marks the southern edge of the farmable land around Livingston. It intersects with State Route 99 in Merced, which it overlaps for a few miles. Travelers coming from most regions of the San Francisco Bay Area or other parts of Northern California to Yosemite Valley and the southern portion of Yosemite would transfer from Highway 99 to Highway 140 at this point. For those coming from San Jose and the rest of the Silicon Valley, the most direct, fastest route is State Route 152 east; then the roads of Road 9, Bliss Road, Sandy Mush Road, and Plainsburg Road to reach Highway 140 in Planada. (Those going to the northern portion of Yosemite would have instead taken either I-580 and I-205 leaving the Bay Area, then State Route 120 east through Manteca, or State Route 132 east through Modesto.)

After exiting Highway 99, Highway 140 continues through Planada, after which the farmland gives way to grazing land. It is quite dry in the summer due to California's Mediterranean climate, and the dry grass gives the landscape a golden color. Western meadowlarks, American kestrels, red-tailed hawks and turkey vultures are frequently glimpsed. A few blue oaks can be seen as the highway leaves the valley and begins to climb through the foothills of the Sierra Nevada range. They become more and more numerous as the elevation increases. As the highway passes through Catheys Valley the vegetation begins to diversify a little. California live oaks and ponderosa pines intermingle with blue oaks as it nears the town of Mariposa. Traversing Mariposa, it runs concurrently with State Route 49 for about a mile.

A ponderosa pine forest borders the highway on both sides as it passes through Midpines. As it approaches Briceburg, the roadway follows a steep, winding grade down to the Merced River valley. The highway then runs alongside the Merced River for about 20 miles (32 km) to the Yosemite National Park entrance, after passing through El Portal. The upper stretch of the Merced River valley below the park, which the highway follows, is designated as Wild and Scenic River Area. The area separates Sierra National Forest (south) and Stanislaus National Forest (north).

Inside Yosemite, state routes are federally maintained and are not included in the state route logs, but the park may still sign these state routes at intersections. The highway continues into the park as El Portal Drive, following the Merced River to Yosemite Valley. The road intersects with Big Oak Flat Road, providing a connection to State Route 120. El Portal Drive then splits into a one way loop road to connect the rest of the valley, heading east as Southside Drive on the south side of the river and then looping back west as Northside Drive on the north side of the river. State Route 41/Wawona Road intersects with Southside Drive just east of the split.

SR 140 is part of the California Freeway and Expressway System, and is part of the National Highway System, a network of highways that are considered essential to the country's economy, defense, and mobility by the Federal Highway Administration. SR 140 is eligible to be included in the State Scenic Highway System; however, only the part of the road from Mariposa to El Portal is designated as a scenic highway.

== History ==
The "All-Weather Highway" (now SR 140) opened in 1926, ensuring year-long access.

In June 2006, the road was closed between El Portal and Mariposa due to a rock slide. The Ferguson Slide buried about 600 feet (180 m) of SR 140 between Cedar Lodge and Briceburg Visitor Center between SR 49 and SR 41. A one-lane detour opened in August 2006, with a traffic signal light system to allow drivers to skirt the original slide damage area. Construction was scheduled to begin in 2026 on a rock shed through the slide area to restore the original alignment.

The road was closed from August 1 to August, 19, 2018, due to the Ferguson Fire.

== Major intersections ==
Except where prefixed with a letter, postmiles were measured on the road as it was in 1964, based on the alignment that existed at the time, and do not necessarily reflect current mileage. Postmile prefixes include: R reflecting a realignment in the route since then, M indicating a second realignment, L referring to an overlap due to a correction or change, and T indicating postmiles classified as temporary. Segments that remain unconstructed or have been relinquished to local control may be omitted. The numbers reset at county lines; the start and end postmiles in each county are given in the county column.

County	Location	Postmile	Exit	Destinations	Notes
Merced		0.00		Sullivan Road	Continuation beyond I-5
Merced		0.00		I-5 (West Side Freeway) – Sacramento, Los Angeles	Interchange; west end of SR 140; I-5 exit 418
Merced	Gustine	4.35		SR 33 south / Sullivan Road	West end of SR 33 overlap
Merced	Gustine	6.06		SR 33 north / First Avenue – Newman, Tracy	East end of SR 33 overlap
Merced		16.22		SR 165 (Lander Avenue) – Stevinson, Hilmar, Turlock, Los Banos	
Merced		23.43		Lincoln Boulevard – Livingston	
Merced		29.47		Applegate Road – Atwater	
Merced	Merced	35.81 15.77 (Note: Indicates that the postmile represents the distance along SR 99 rather than SR 140.)		SR 99 north / SR 59 north (V Street) – Sacramento, Sonora	Interchange; west end of SR 99 / SR 59 overlap; SR 99 south exit 188
Merced	Merced	35.81 15.77	West end of freeway on SR 99		
Merced	Merced	14.69	187B	SR 59 south (Martin Luther King Jr. Way) – Downtown Merced, Los Banos	East end of SR 59 overlap
Merced	Merced	14.41	187A	G Street	Westbound exit and eastbound entrance
Merced	Merced	13.86 35.82	East end of freeway on SR 99		
Merced	Merced	13.86 35.82		SR 99 south / 16th Street (SR 99 Bus. north) – Los Angeles	Interchange; east end of SR 99 overlap; SR 99 north exit 186B
Merced	Merced	38.26		Campus Parkway Access to SR 99	Connects to Campus Parkway
Merced	Planada	43.70		Plainsburg Road – Le Grand, Madera, Fresno	
Mariposa	Catheys Valley	9.50		Hornitos Road – Hornitos	
Mariposa	Mariposa	21.22		SR 49 south – Oakhurst	West end of SR 49 overlap
Mariposa	Mariposa	22.00		SR 49 north / Jones Street – Coulterville, Sonora	East end of SR 49 overlap
Mariposa	Yosemite National Park	51.80	East end of state maintenance at western park boundary		
Mariposa	Yosemite National Park		Arch Rock Entrance Station; park fee or pass required for entry		
Mariposa	Yosemite National Park			Big Oak Flat Road to SR 120 (Tioga Road) – Manteca	
Mariposa	Yosemite National Park			Northside Drive	Entrance only
Mariposa	Yosemite National Park			SR 41 south (Wawona Road) – Wawona, Fresno	Eastbound access only
Mariposa	Yosemite National Park			Southside Drive – Yosemite Valley Destinations	Continuation beyond SR 41; westbound entrance only accessible via Northside Drive
1.000 mi = 1.609 km; 1.000 km = 0.621 mi: Concurrency terminus; Incomplete access; Tolled
