= Onion Valley =

Onion Valley, California
- Former settlement
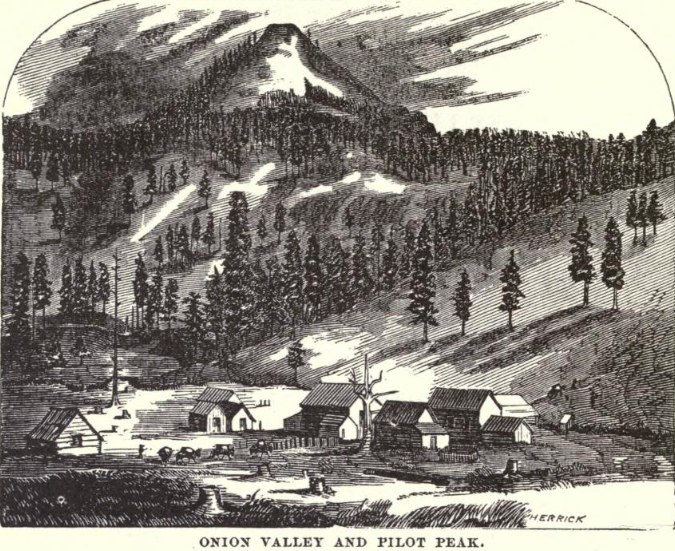
- Onion Valley and Pilot Peak, California

- Location within California Location within the United States
- Coordinates: 39°47′45″N 120°52′55″W
- Country: United States
- State: California
- County: Plumas
- Elevation: 6,292 ft (1,918 m)
- Time zone: UTC-8 (Pacific (PST))
  - Summer (DST): UTC-7 (PDT)
- GeoNames feature ID: 5379432

California Historical Landmark
- Reference no.: 723

Onion Valley, California is a former California gold rush mining settlement and supply station in Plumas County, California, United States.

== Geography ==
Onion Valley was located on Onion Valley Creek northeast of La Porte, California at the foot of Pilot Peak.

Note that the California counties of Inyo, Sierra, Placer, Amador and Calaveras have other locations with the same name.

== History ==
Onion Valley was named for the wild onion plants native to the area. As a Gold Rush community, population may have peaked at 1,500 in 1851 with six hotels, a few stores and saloons, gambling parlor and a bowling alley. Business started to decline at the end of 1851, and by 1853 only 120 settlers are noted.

Organized ski club downhill speed races were held at Onion Valley starting in 1861, with Sierra longboard skis referred to as "Norwegian snow-shoes". California Historical Landmarks No. 723 and 724 reference Onion Valley as a pioneer organized ski club in America.

The 1880 population was listed as 23. A hotel and the Eclipse mine was in the area.

Photographs capture the decline of the area's human structures from 1905 to 1953.

== See also ==
- Plumas National Forest
- Pacific Crest Trail
- Lost Sierra
- List of ghost towns in California
