= Gabriel J. Chin =

American legal scholar

Gabriel Chin
- Born: c. 1965 (aged c. 61)
- Education: Wesleyan University (BA) University of Michigan Law School (JD) Yale Law School (LLM)

Gabriel Jack Chin (born c. 1965) is an American author, legal scholar, and professor at the University of California, Davis School of Law.

He teaches a variety of courses, including Criminal Law, Immigration, Criminal Appellate Advocacy, and Race and Law.

== Biography ==
In 1985 he received a BA from Wesleyan University. In 1988 he received a J.D. from University of Michigan Law School. In 1995 he received an LLM from Yale Law School, and was an Editor of the Yale Law & Policy Review. He is an elected member of the American Law Institute. Before becoming a law professor, "[he] clerked for U.S. District Judge Richard P. Matsch in Denver and practiced with Skadden, Arps, Slate, Meagher & Flom and The Legal Aid Society of New York."

He was named in the "Most Cited Law Professors By Specialty, 2000-2007", and in the "50 Most Cited Law Professors Who Entered Teaching Since 1992", surveys by University of Chicago professor Brian Leiter. Professor Chin appeared on the October 16, 2006 episode of The Daily Show with Jon Stewart on a segment titled "Hawk the Vote" discussing the legality of the Arizona Voter Rewards Initiative", a proposal to offer financial incentives for voting. He also criticized the proposal on Marketplace on November 2, 2006. In 2002, he appeared on NPR's Morning Edition discussing his efforts, in conjunction with law students, to repeal racist Jim Crow laws still on the books. He was named one of the "25 Most Notable Asians in America" by A Magazine for his work in this area.

In 2011, Chin supervised members of UC Davis's Asian Pacific American Law Students Association who sought posthumous admission to the State Bar of California for Hong Chang, who was denied admission in 1890. In 2015, the Supreme Court of California would grant the students' petition.

== Books ==
Chin has edited and contributed to a number of books, including:

- United States Commission on Civil Rights: Reports on Asian Pacific Americans (2005) ISBN 978-0-8377-3105-6
- United States Commission on Civil Rights: Reports on Voting (2005) (co-editor) ISBN 978-0-8377-3103-2
- United States Commission on Civil Rights: Reports on the Police (2005) ISBN 978-0-8377-3104-9
- The United States Commission on Immigration Reform: The Interim and Final Reports and Commentary (2000) ISBN 978-1-57588-566-7
- Immigration and the Constitution (2000) (co-editor) ISBN 978-0-8153-3346-3
- Affirmative Action and the Constitution (1998) ISBN 978-0-8153-2742-4
- New York City Policy Corruption Investigation Commissions, 1894-1994 (1997) ISBN 978-1-57588-211-6

== Other works ==
Chin is the author or co-author of many legal papers, including:

- "Unjustified: The Practical Irrelevance of the Justification/Excuse Distinction", 43 Michigan Journal of Law Reform (2009)
- "Beyond the Super-Majority: Post-Adoption Ratification of the Equality Amendments", 50 Ariz. L. Rev. 25 (2008)(co-author)
- "The Tyranny of the Minority: Jim Crow and the Counter-Majoritarian Difficulty", 43 Harv. C.R.-C.L. L. Rev. 65 (2008) (co-author)
- "Unexplainable on Grounds of Race: Doubts about Yick Wo", 2008 Illinois Law Review 1359.
- "A War on Drugs or a War on Immigrants? Expanding the Definition of 'Drug Trafficking' in Determining Aggravated Felon Status for Non-Citizens", 64 Md. L. Rev. 875 (2005) (co-author)
- Jim Crow's Long Goodbye, 21 Const. Comment. 107 (2004)
- "Race, The War on Drugs, and the Collateral Consequences of Criminal Conviction", 6 Iowa J. Gender, Race, & Just. 253 (2003), reprinted in Civil Penalties, Social Consequences 27
- Pledging Allegiance to the Constitution: The First Amendment and Loyalty Oaths for Faculty at Private Universities, 64 U. Pitt. L. Rev. 431 (2003)
- "Effective Assistance of Counsel and the consequences of guilty Pleas", 87 Cornell L. Rev. (2002) (co-author)
- Can a Reasonable Doubt have an Unreasonable Price? Limitations on Attorney's Fees in Criminal Cases, 41 B.C. L. Rev. 1 (1999) (co-author)
- "The Civil Rights Revolution Comes to Immigration Law: A New Look at the Immigration and Nationality Act of 1965", 75 North Carolina L. Rev. 273 (1996).
- "The Plessy Myth: Justice Harlan and the Chinese Cases", 82 Iowa L. Rev. 151 (1996), excerpted in F. Michael Higginbotham, Race Law: Cases, Commentary, and Questions 327 (2001)
- "Why Senator John McCain Cannot Be President: Eleven Months and a Hundred Yards Short of Citizenship", Arizona Legal Studies Discussion Paper No. 08-14 (2008).
