= Ganns, California =

Unincorporated community in California, United States

Ganns
- Unincorporated community
- Location in California Ganns (the United States)
- Coordinates: 38°24′16″N 120°09′33″W
- Country: United States
- State: California
- County: Calaveras
- Elevation: 6,742 ft (2,055 m)

Ganns, or Ganns Meadows, is an unincorporated community in Calaveras County, California, United States. It lies at an elevation of 6742 feet (2055 m). The community was settled in the 1870s as a summer grazing camp for the Gann family's cattle business. Vacation homes and a restaurant were later built at the site.
