= Gibsonville, California =

Ghost town in California, United States

- Ghost town
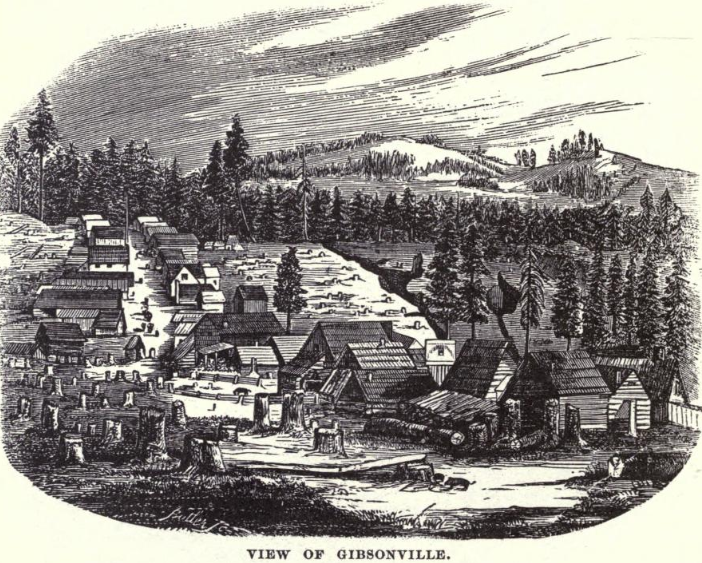
- Illustration of Gibsonville, 1856

- Location within California Location within the United States
- Coordinates: 39°44′25″N 120°54′32″W
- Country: United States
- State: California
- County: Sierra
- Elevation: 5,430 ft (1,660 m)
- Time zone: UTC-8 (Pacific (PST))
  - Summer (DST): UTC-7 (PDT)
- Area code: 530
- GNIS feature ID: 1658608

Gibsonville is a former settlement in Sierra County, California, United States.

== Geography ==
Gibsonville is 3 miles (4.8 km) west-northwest of Mount Fillmore.

== History ==
Gibsonville was founded in 1850, named after James Gibson, who guided a group of miners into the area. Population reportedly peaked early at 2000 residents, declining to 700 in 1855 then to 200 around 1882. A post office opened in Gibsonville in 1855 and closed in 1910. The land beneath the Gibsonville townsite was reworked by gold miners in the 1930s. By 1964, Gibsonville was a "ghost town".
