= Grass Flat, California =

Unincorporated community in California, United States

- Unincorporated community
- Location within California Location within the United States
- Coordinates: 39°40′33″N 120°56′07″W
- Country: United States
- State: California
- County: Sierra
- U.S. National Forest Service: Plumas National Forest
- Elevation: 4,859 ft (1,481 m)
- Time zone: UTC-8 (Pacific (PST))
  - Summer (DST): UTC-7 (PDT)
- Area code: 530
- GNIS feature ID: 1658652

Grass Flat is an unincorporated community and ghost town in northwestern Sierra County, California, United States.

== Geography ==
Grass Flat is on Port Wine Ridge Road in the Sierra Nevada, within Plumas National Forest.

The site is 5.5 miles (8.9 km) southwest of Mount Fillmore.

== History ==
Grass Flat was established as a gold mining camp during the California Gold Rush (1848-1850s), in the far northern Northern Mines District.

== See also ==
- History of Sierra County, California
- List of ghost towns in California
