= Glorietta, Orinda, California =

Former unincorporated community

Coordinates: 37°51′44″N 122°10′05″W

Glorietta is a former unincorporated community, now annexed to Orinda in Contra Costa County, California.

It lies at an elevation of 597 feet (182 m).
