= Gold Flat, California =

Unincorporated community in California, United States

Gold Flat
- Unincorporated community
- Location in California Gold Flat (the United States)
- Coordinates: 39°14′46″N 121°01′28″W
- Country: United States
- State: California
- County: Nevada County
- Elevation: 2,651 ft (808 m)

Gold Flat is an unincorporated community in Nevada County, California. It lies at an elevation of 2651 feet (808 m). Gold Flat is located 2.5 miles (4.0 km) northeast of Grass Valley.

Like many communities in the area, Gold Flat was established as a gold mining district. In 1851, Gold Flat was a small town with a gambling house, stores, boarding-houses, and six saloons, with an estimated population of 300. In later years it became a farming district. Today it is a mixed residential and commercial area between Grass Valley and Nevada City.
