= Burton Frasher =

American photographer and publisher

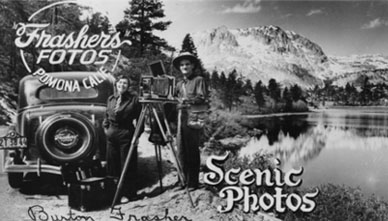
- Frasher Card
- Born: July 25, 1888; Aurora, Colorado, United States
- Died: April 24, 1955 (aged 66); Pomona, California, United States
- Known for: Photography, publishing
- Spouse: Josephine Frasher
- Website: content.ci.pomona.ca.us/index_frasher.php

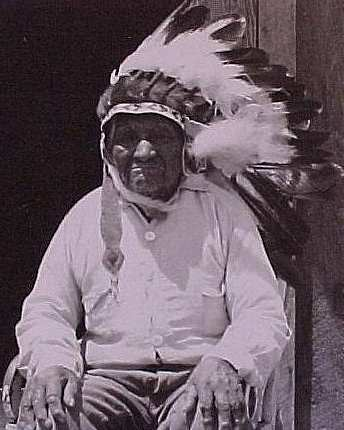
Captain Sam, Yosemite-Mono Lake Paiute. 1927 photo by Burton Frasher.

Burton Frasher (July 25, 1888 – April 24, 1955) was an American photographer and publisher of mid-century modern ephemera. His black-and-white landscape photographs of the American West have been widely reproduced.

== Career ==
After years of traveling while working in the fruit packing industry, he and his wife Josephine opened a photo shop in La Verne, California in 1914. Six years later they moved to Pomona where he expanded his studio by publishing postcards. Frasher went to great lengths to find images for his real photo postcards. He traveled extensively through California, Arizona, New Mexico, Colorado, Utah, and Nevada, ranging up through Oregon, Washington, and Alaska, and down through Baja California region and Sonora, Mexico, taking pictures during a time these locations were still largely inaccessible by road. The photographers most famously associated with the American West are Edward Weston and Ansel Adams. Whereas Weston and Adams treated the landscape as a canvas for formal artistic exploration, Frasher sought to capture the scenic wonders. He included the distant vista, the trail of footsteps, and the occasional human being, all devices to keep monumentality in scale. In contrast, Weston focused on geologic forms and the textures of sand and sky, creating abstract compositions in which distances are utterly ambiguous. It is a measure of their separate achievements that the 1939 Works Project Administration's Death Valley: A Guide reproduces images by both photographers.

During the Depression and pre-WWII years he reproduced his images as printed linens manufactured by Curt Teich, allowing national distribution. In 1948, over 3 1/2 million "Frasher Fotos" postcards were sold nationwide. Curt Teich was the most prominent and largest printer and publisher of Linen Type postcards, based in Chicago. Burton Frasher was one of the most prominent card publishers on the West Coast. Curt Teich printed most of the Linen Type postcards for Piltz utilizing Teich's "C.T. Art-Colortone" printing method. Other publishers in California include Stanley Piltz in San Francisco, Western Publishing and Novelty Company, Tichnor Art Company in Los Angeles, B. W. White in Monterey and Stephen H. Willard in Palm Springs.

Frasher looked closely at the developing urban landscape of the American West with a particular concentration on the cities of Las Vegas and Los Angeles. Frasher's photographs detail the automobile's profound impact on the architecture of these two cities. His extensive archive of night photographs of Las Vegas and Los Angeles explores an urban world designed for observation and navigation from behind the wheel of a slow moving motor vehicle. He combined a passion for automobile travel and photography into a postcard business that proved popular with motoring tourists of the 1930s and 1940s. Frasher's photographs are a fascinating visual resource of a dynamic period in the history of modern California and the West.
