= Glenblair, California =

Unincorporated community in California, United States

Glenblair
- Unincorporated community
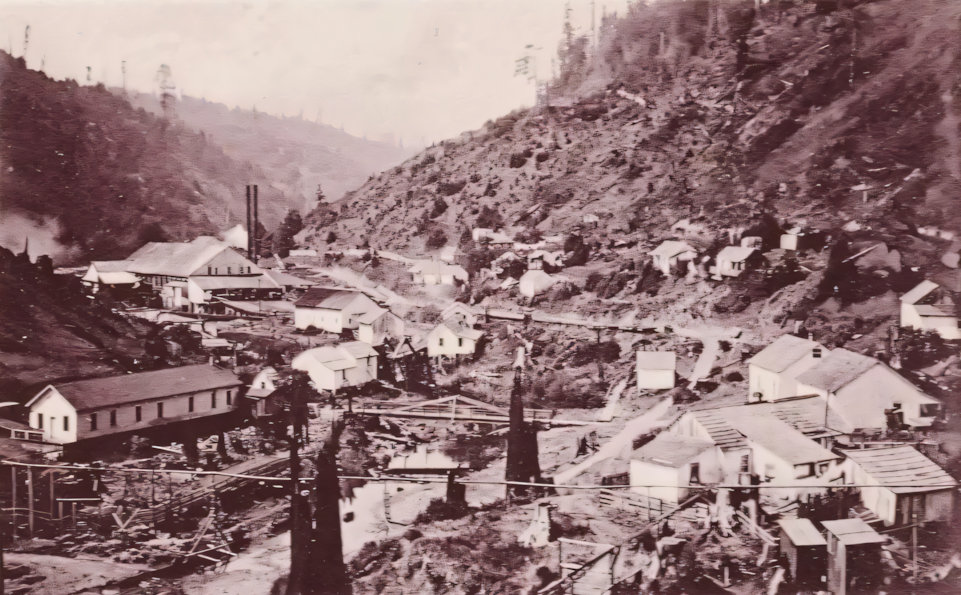

- Location in California Glenblair (the United States)
- Coordinates: 39°27′28″N 123°43′31″W
- Country: United States
- State: California
- County: Mendocino
- Elevation: 207 ft (63 m)

Glenblair or Glen Blair was an unincorporated community in Mendocino County, California, United States. It was located 15 miles (24 km) north-northwest of Comptche, at an elevation of 207 feet (63 m).

A post office operated at Glenblair from 1903 to 1928. The name honors the Glen Blair Lumber Company that shipped lumber from the place.

Glen Blair was a lumbering community from 1885 to 1928, located on Pudding Creek a few miles inland from Fort Bragg. The town was centered around a sawmill, but also had a school, social hall, general store, and saloon. The sawmill discontinued operation in 1925, and the logging railroad to Fort Bragg was removed in 1942. Today, the Glen Blair townsite can be reached by hiking trail, but little remains. A Glen Blair Bar near the old townsite opened in 2022, accessible only by a special stop on the California Western Railroad.
