= Mount Fillmore =

Mountain in California, United States

- Location within California

Highest point
- Elevation: 7,719 ft (2,353 m) NAVD 88
- Prominence: 1,675 ft (511 m)
- Coordinates: 39°43′49″N 120°51′09″W

Geography
- Location: Sierra County, California, U.S.
- Parent range: Sierra Nevada
- Topo map: USGS Mount Fillmore

Mount Fillmore is a mountain in the Plumas National Forest in Sierra County, California. It is 8 miles (13 km) northeast of La Porte and 12 miles (19 km) north of Downieville.

Mount Fillmore was named for a naval officer.
