= Glenview Historic District (Memphis, Tennessee) =

Historic district in Tennessee, United States

- U.S. National Register of Historic Places
- U.S. Historic district
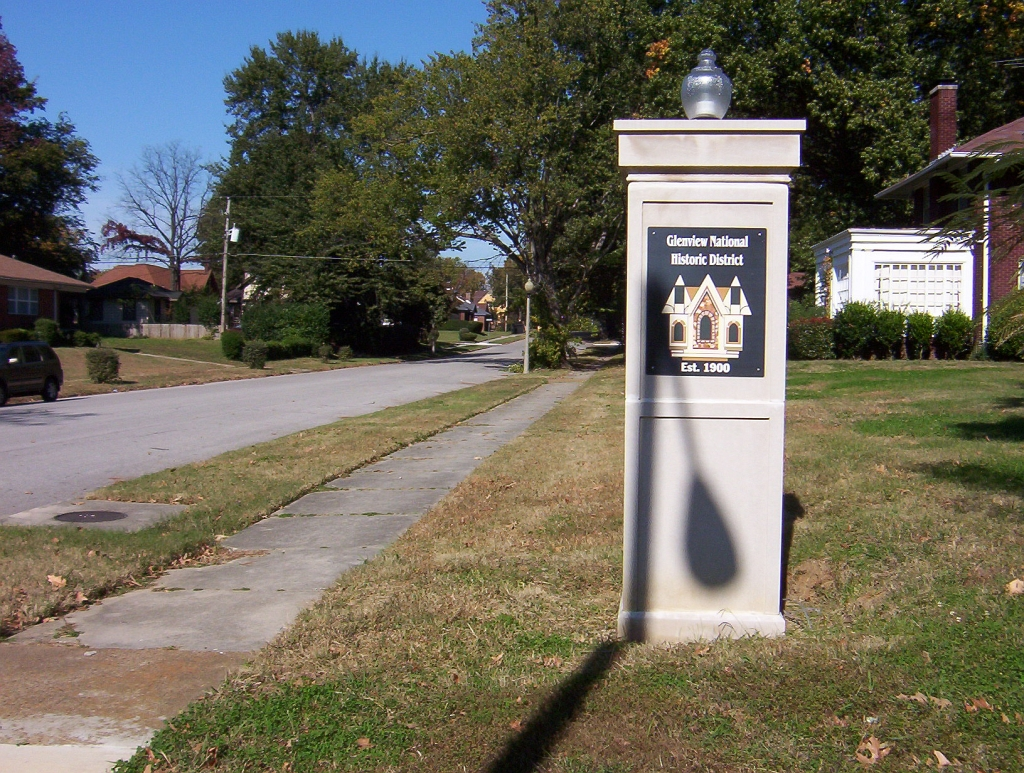
- Glenview Historic District

- Location within Tennessee Location within the United States
- Location: Bounded by Southern RR, Lamar Ave., S. Parkway E., and Frisco RR, Memphis, Tennessee
- Coordinates: 35.11256°N 90.00795°W
- Built: 1908
- Architectural style: Bungalow/Craftsman, Colonial Revival
- MPS: Residential Resources of Memphis MPS
- NRHP reference No.: 99001244
- Added to NRHP: October 07, 1999

Glenview Historic District is a neighborhood in Memphis, Tennessee that was listed on the National Register of Historic Places as a historic district in 1999. The neighborhood is between South Memphis and Midtown and bounded by the Illinois Central Railroad on the west, Lamar Ave on the east, Southern Ave on the north and South Parkway on the south.

Glenview was one of several suburban residential subdivisions in Memphis that were created during a building boom in the early 20th century. Architecture is representative of suburban development of that period, including bungalows, cottages, Foursquare, Colonial, Dutch Colonial Tudor and Spanish Revival styles.

Glenview has many well-kept houses and is majority African American. It is also home to Eternal Peace Missionary Baptist Church, The Willet Apartments and Glenview Community Center. Home sizes range from about 1,000 square feet (93 m^{2}) to 3,000 square feet (280 m^{2}).
