= Gustine, California =

City in California, United States

- City
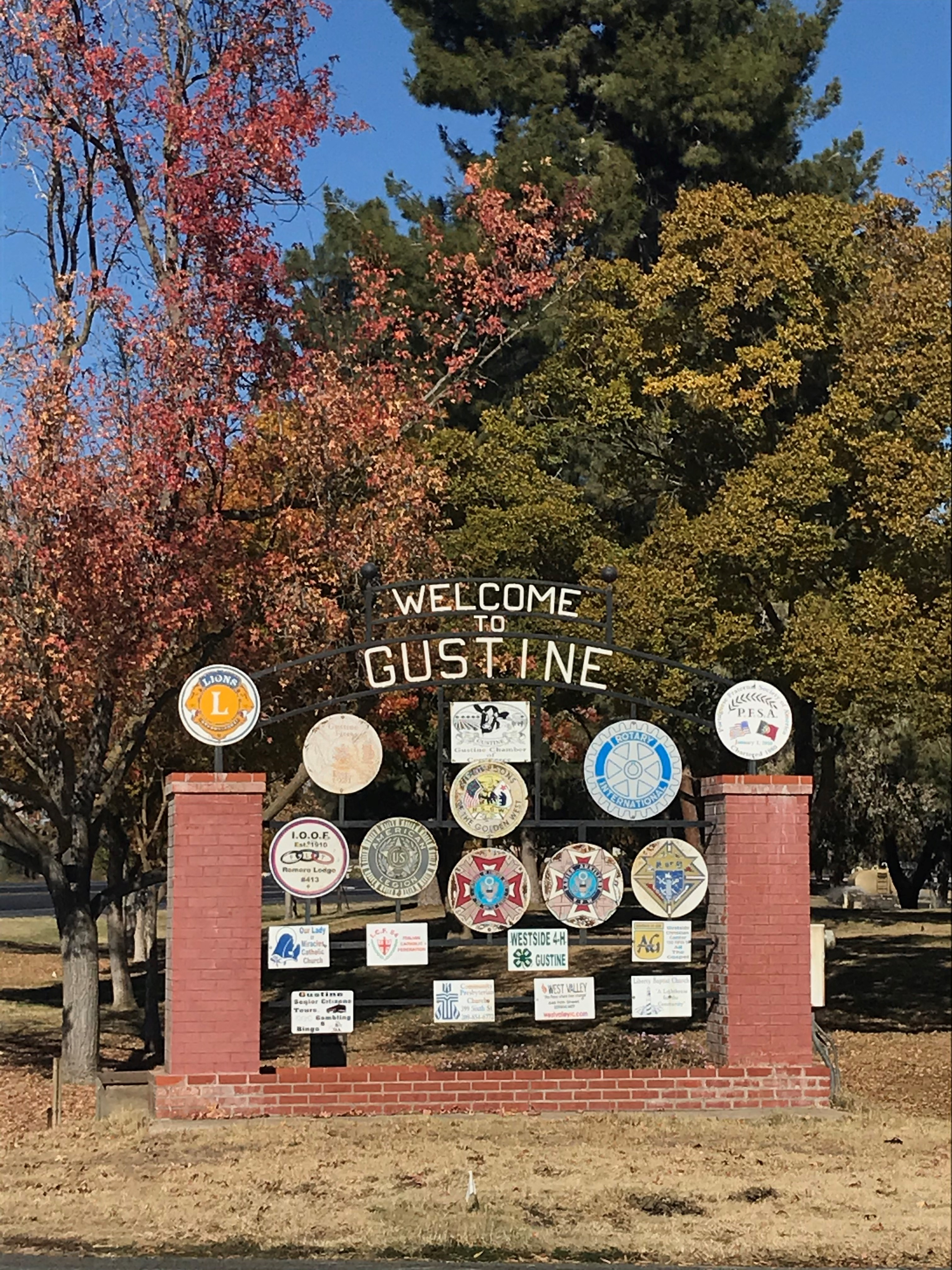
- Welcome to Gustine sign
- Interactive map of Gustine, California
- Location within California Location within the United States
- Coordinates: 37°15′28″N 120°59′56″W
- Country: United States
- State: California
- County: Merced
- Incorporated: November 11, 1915

Area
  - Total: 1.55 sq mi (4.0 km^{2})
  - Land: 1.55 sq mi (4.0 km^{2})
  - Water: 0.00 sq mi (0 km^{2}) 0%
- Elevation: 98 ft (30 m)

Population (2020)
  - Total: 6,110
  - Density: 3,939.39/sq mi (1,521.01/km^{2})
- Time zone: UTC-8 (Pacific)
  - Summer (DST): UTC-7 (PDT)
- ZIP code: 95322
- Area code: 209
- FIPS code: 06-31568
- GNIS feature ID: 1658690
- Website: www.cityofgustine.com

Gustine is a city in Merced County, California, United States. Gustine is located 29 miles (47 km) west of Merced, at an elevation of 98 feet (30 m). At the 2020 census, the city population was 6,110, up from 5,520 at the 2010 census.

== Geography ==
Gustine is located in the San Joaquin Valley at 37°15′28″N 120°59′56″W at an elevation of about 31 m (101 ft) above MSL.

According to the United States Census Bureau, the city has a total area of 1.6 square miles (4.1 km^{2}), all t land.

=== Climate ===
This region experiences hot and dry summers, with no average monthly temperatures above 71.6 °F. According to the Köppen Climate Classification system, Gustine has a warm-summer Mediterranean climate, abbreviated "Csb" on climate maps.

== History ==
Gustine was established in the early 1900s as a station on the Southern Pacific Railroad and named after Sara Miller, nicknamed "Gussie", the daughter of Henry Miller, the "Cattle King", an early California land baron and Agricultural pioneer. Sara's middle name was Augustine, that is where the name Gustine comes from. Little Sara, always getting "gussied up" with fancy clothes, was killed when she was thrown from her horse when she was eight years old. The first post office opened in 1907. The city was incorporated in 1915.

Gustine was the site of the first 9-1-1 system in California, installed in March 1970.

Gustine is home to the nation's largest festa which is steeped in Portuguese tradition.

Gustine High School is home to the longest running basketball tournament in the state of California, which is put on by the city's Rotary Club. The tournament has been put on by the Rotary Club and celebrated its 75th anniversary in 2017.

== Demographics ==
Historical population
Census	Pop.	Note	%±
1920	716		—
1930	1,016		41.9%
1940	1,355		33.4%
1950	1,984		46.4%
1960	2,300		15.9%
1970	2,793		21.4%
1980	3,142		12.5%
1990	3,931		25.1%
2000	4,698		19.5%
2010	5,520		17.5%
2020	6,110		10.7%
U.S. Decennial Census

=== 2020 census ===
As of the 2020 census, Gustine had a population of 6,110 and a population density of 3,939.4 inhabitants per square mile (1,521.0/km^{2}). The median age was 35.3 years. 27.3% of residents were under the age of 18, 9.1% were aged 18 to 24, 24.3% were aged 25 to 44, 23.3% were aged 45 to 64, and 16.0% were 65 years of age or older. For every 100 females, there were 97.5 males, and for every 100 females age 18 and over, there were 94.7 males age 18 and over.

99.7% of residents lived in urban areas, while 0.3% lived in rural areas.

The whole population lived in households. There were 2,035 households, of which 41.1% had children under the age of 18 living in them. Of all households, 51.1% were married-couple households, 6.5% were cohabiting couple households, 17.8% were households with a male householder and no spouse or partner present, and 24.6% were households with a female householder and no spouse or partner present. About 20.3% of all households were made up of individuals, and 11.4% had someone living alone who was 65 years of age or older. The average household size was 3.0. There were 1,505 families (74.0% of all households).

There were 2,146 housing units at an average density of 1,383.6 units per square mile (534.2 units/km^{2}). Of these, 2,035 (94.8%) were occupied and 5.2% were vacant. Of occupied housing units, 61.6% were owner-occupied and 38.4% were occupied by renters. The homeowner vacancy rate was 0.9%, and the rental vacancy rate was 4.4%.

Racial composition as of the 2020 census
Race	Number	Percent
White	2,721	44.5%
Black or African American	39	0.6%
American Indian and Alaska Native	111	1.8%
Asian	93	1.5%
Native Hawaiian and Other Pacific Islander	11	0.2%
Some other race	2,187	35.8%
Two or more races	948	15.5%
Hispanic or Latino (of any race)	3,811	62.4%

=== Demographic estimates ===
In 2023, the US Census Bureau estimated that 31.8% of the population were foreign-born. Of all people aged 5 or older, 41.5% spoke only English at home, 54.5% spoke Spanish, 2.6% spoke other Indo-European languages, and 1.3% spoke Asian or Pacific Islander languages. Of those aged 25 or older, 72.2% were high school graduates and 9.1% had a bachelor's degree.

=== Income and poverty ===
The median household income in 2023 was $58,321, and the per capita income was $25,725. About 2.2% of families and 4.1% of the population were below the poverty line.

=== 2010 census ===
At the 2010 census Gustine had a population of 5,520. The population density was 3,559.1 inhabitants per square mile (1,374.2/km^{2}). The racial makeup of Gustine was 3,875 (70.2%) White, 73 (1.3%) African American, 54 (1.0%) Native American, 95 (1.7%) Asian, 8 (0.1%) Pacific Islander, 1,191 (21.6%) from other races, and 224 (4.1%) from two or more races. Hispanic or Latino of any race were 2,769 persons (50.2%).

The whole population lived in households, no one lived in non-institutionalized group quarters and no one was institutionalized.

There were 1,879 households, 757 (40.3%) had children under the age of 18 living in them, 1,025 (54.6%) were opposite-sex married couples living together, 227 (12.1%) had a female householder with no husband present, 118 (6.3%) had a male householder with no wife present. There were 98 (5.2%) unmarried opposite-sex partnerships, and 5 (0.3%) same-sex married couples or partnerships. 437 households (23.3%) were one person and 234 (12.5%) had someone living alone who was 65 or older. The average household size was 2.94. There were 1,370 families (72.9% of households); the average family size was 3.50.

The age distribution was 1,577 people (28.6%) under the age of 18, 481 people (8.7%) aged 18 to 24, 1,352 people (24.5%) aged 25 to 44, 1,319 people (23.9%) aged 45 to 64, and 791 people (14.3%) who were 65 or older. The median age was 35.3 years. For every 100 females, there were 98.3 males. For every 100 females age 18 and over, there were 96.4 males.

There were 2,087 housing units at an average density of 1,345.6 per square mile, of the occupied units 1,197 (63.7%) were owner-occupied and 682 (36.3%) were rented. The homeowner vacancy rate was 3.4%; the rental vacancy rate was 12.2%. 3,348 people (60.7% of the population) lived in owner-occupied housing units and 2,172 people (39.3%) lived in rental housing units.

=== Portuguese community ===
Gustine is home to a relatively high concentration of ethnic Portuguese-Americans. Most can trace their ancestry back to the Azores, but the Portuguese-speaking community also welcomes many families from mainland Portugal and Brazil. This is shown by a large turnout in the yearly OLM (Our Lady of Miracles) Portuguese Festa when over 20,000 people from around Gustine and far away come to visit.

== Economy ==
Much of the town's income has traditionally come from dairy production and processing; Gustine is the home of a Golden Valley Cheese factory and formerly a Carnation processing plant. In addition, Morningstar Distributing, Hillview Packing, Pusateri Nut Company, and Ingomar Tomato Plant, and Wolfsens' Meat and Sausage are significant businesses in the area. As agricultural land becomes covered by housing developments, Gustine is becoming a bedroom community to the San Francisco Bay Area, a 1½ hour commute away.

== Government ==
In the California State Legislature, Gustine is in the 14th senatorial district, represented by Democrat Anna Caballero, and in the 22nd Assembly district, represented by Republican Juan Alanis.

In the United States House of Representatives, Gustine is in California's 13th congressional district and is represented by Democrat Adam Gray.

== Environmental issues ==
The nearby San Luis National Wildlife Refuge (formerly Kesterson Wildlife Refuge), experienced an accumulation of selenium due to its location at the terminus of the incomplete San Luis Drain. Wildlife in this region developed a number of deformities, drawing the attention of news media and leading to the closure of the refuge.

== Education ==
Gustine is served by the Gustine Unified School District (GUSD) a unified TK–12 public school district, and by the Our Lady of Miracles Catholic School (K-8). There are five schools in the GUSD: Gustine Elementary School (GES), Romero Elementary School (RES), Gustine Middle School (GMS), Gustine High School (GHS), and Pioneer High School (PHS), a continuation school.

== Transportation ==
Gustine is located at the intersection of State Route 33 (SR 33) and SR 140, near the intersection of Interstate 5 and SR 140.

Gustine is served by public Dial-A-Ride from Merced County's The Bus. The service connects Gustine with Los Banos and Dos Palos, and other communities on the west side of Merced County.

The city is also served by Stanislaus Regional Transit Authority route 45W providing connections Monday through Saturday to Newman, Crows Landing, and Patterson. This service to Gustine is proposed to be discontinued in early 2023
