= Hollister =

Hollister can refer to:

== Places ==
=== United States ===
- Hollister, California
- Hollister, Florida
- Hollister, Idaho
- Hollister, Missouri
- Hollister, North Carolina
- Hollister, Oklahoma
- Hollisterville, Pennsylvania
- Hollister, Wisconsin
- Hollister Ranch, a ranch north of Santa Barbara, California

== Other uses ==
- Hollister (surname), an English family name
- USS Hollister (DD-788), a United States Navy Gearing Class destroyer
- Hollister Co., HCO, or simply Hollister, an American clothing brand from Abercrombie & Fitch Co.
- Naval Auxiliary Air Station Hollister
- Hollister riot, one of the first instances of motorcycle gang activity, in 1947
- Hollister Municipal Airport, a public general aviation airport located in Hollister, California
