= Dunneville, California =

Unincorporated community in California, United States

- Unincorporated community
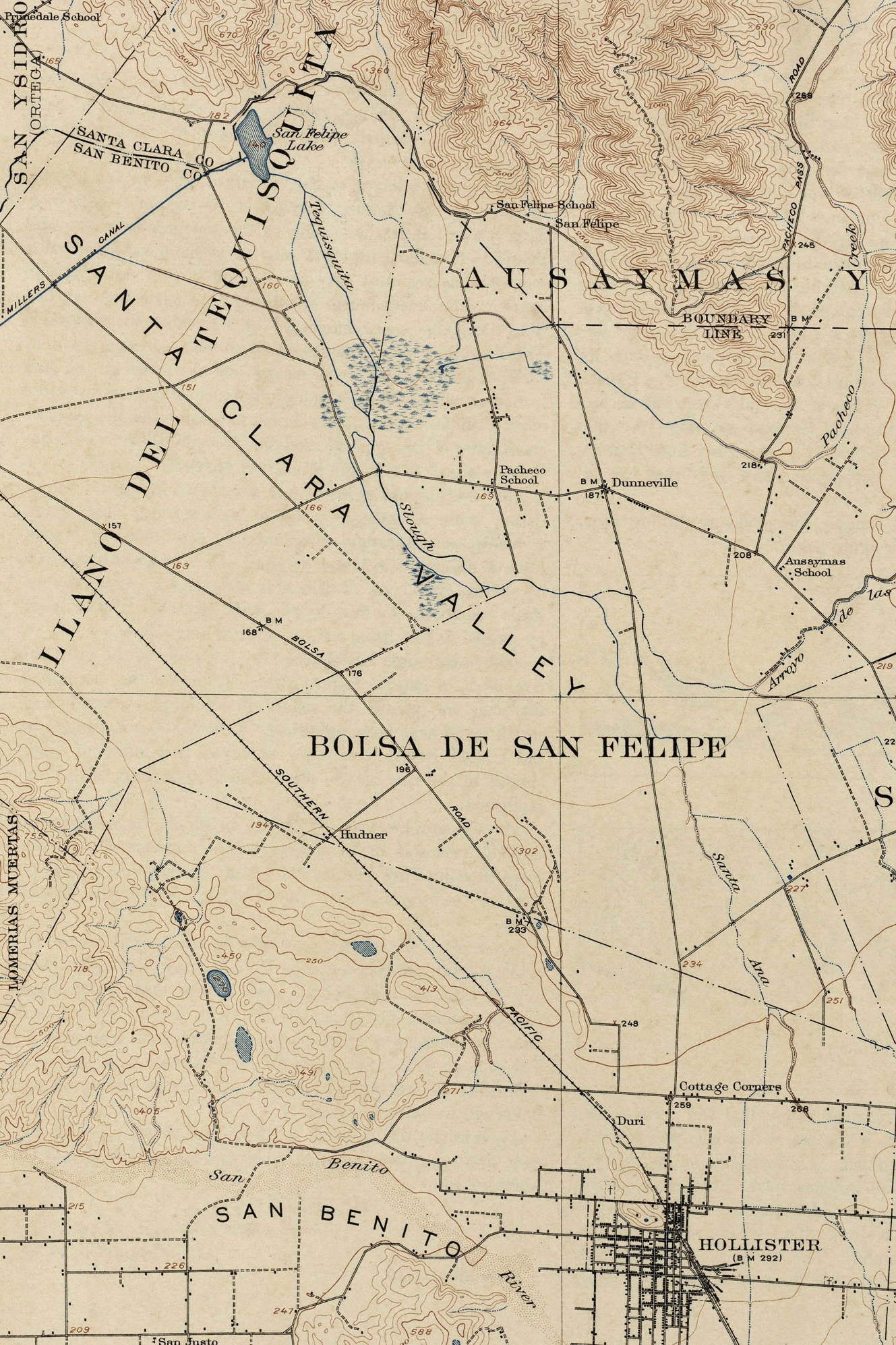
- Tesquisquita Slough, Dunneville, and Pacecho Pass c. 1919

- Location within California
- Coordinates: 36°56′26″N 121°24′38″W
- Country: United States
- State: California
- County: San Benito
- Elevation: 190 ft (58 m)
- Time zone: UTC-8 (Pacific (PST))
  - Summer (DST): UTC-7 (PDT)
- Area code: 831
- GNIS feature ID: 222739

Dunneville is an archaic placename and historic crossroads "surrounded by orchards" in San Benito County, California, United States. Dunneville is 6.1 miles (9.8 km) north of Hollister.

== Name ==
Dunneville has also been known as Chase's Corner, Four Corners and Dunneville Corners. The name Dunneville comes from a prosperous local Irish-American merchant and landowner named James Dunne. The story (probably apocryphal) goes that his son, rancher James Dunne Jr., could so reliably be found at the bar at Four Corners that it came to be named for him. Later, Dunne's widow Viola Lowrey Dunne donated Dunne Park in nearby Hollister to the people of San Benito County and asked that it be named his honor.

== History ==
Prior to settlement, there was a "large Ausaima village, Poitoquix, located in the general vicinity of Dunneville (possibly on south bank of Pacheco Creek or north bank of Tequisquita Slough)." This village may have been the one described by a Spanish visitor in 1774, although the exact location referenced is unknown, "...we came to a large grove, heavily grown with cottonwoods, sycamores, willows, and briars, and within it there was a large village...near the village we saw a large pool of water, and judging from the course of growth of trees there might be a running arroyo there."

The land that became Dunneville was the Rancho Bolsa de San Felipe, a cattle ranch of 2 square Spanish leagues in size, that was granted to Don Francisco Pérez Pacheco during the Mexican California era. Dunneville is located near Pacheco Creek along what was once the stagecoach route between Watsonville and Tres Pinos. Alice Culverwell, member of a touring party traveling from Santa Cruz to Yosemite in 1891, mentioned Dunneville in her travel diary, "Here we are at San Luis rancho. We came through Pacheco Pass yesterday and the scenery was grand...This is a most beautiful morning; breakfast at 5 a. m. To get here to San Luis ranch we have passed Hollister, Dunneville, Belle and Summit stations. Weather fine so far; some dust and a little wind, but everything goes when you are camping."

A post office was optimistically established at Dunneville, Monterey County, California in 1874. The applicant reported that Dunneville was not currently a village but the "prospects were that it will be." The application claimed the post office would serve 350 people in a 1 1/2 mile radius. The year after San Benito County was incorporated in 1874, the Dunneville post office of neighbor and source Monterey County was discontinued.

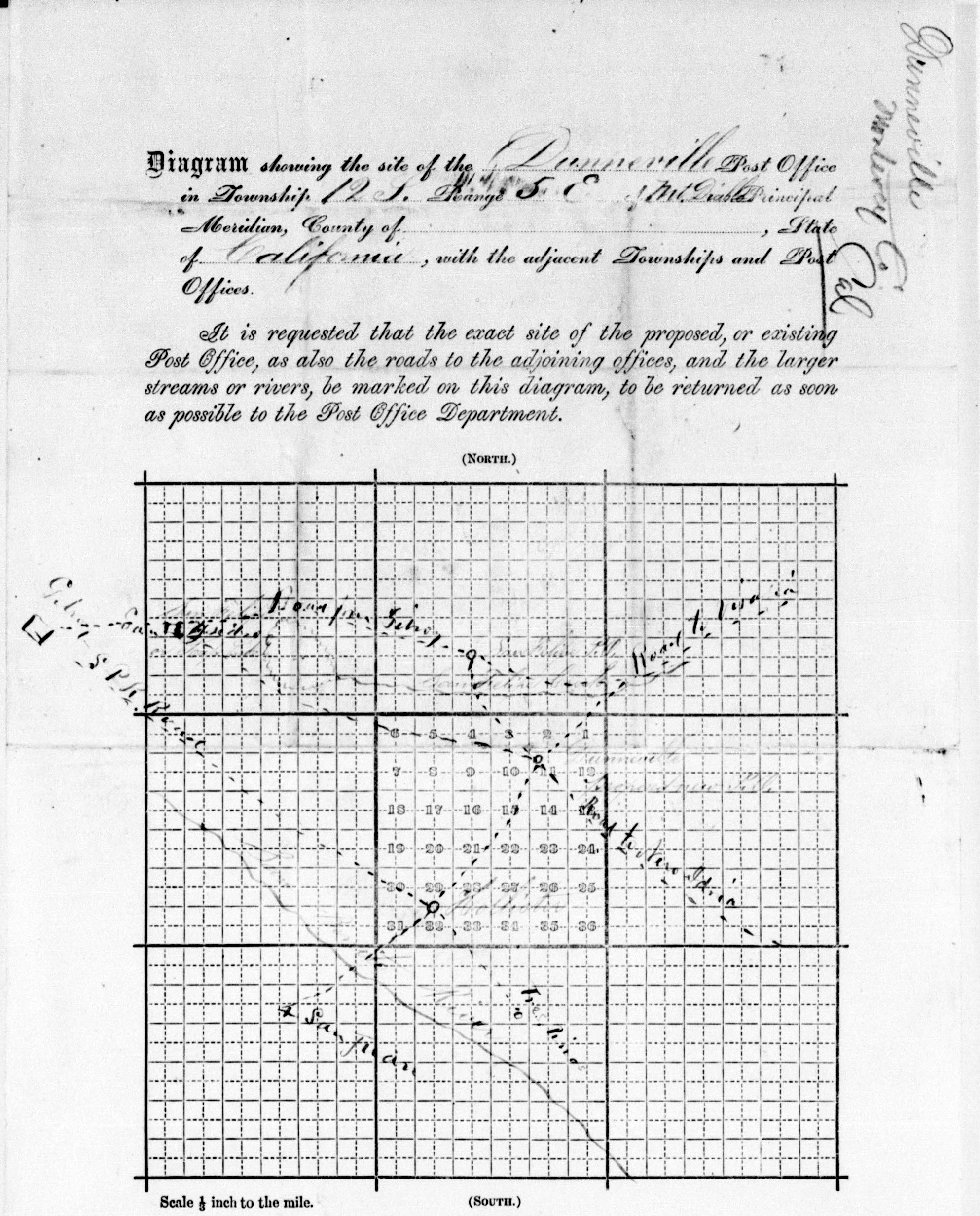
Dunneville, California site map accompanying 1874 post office application

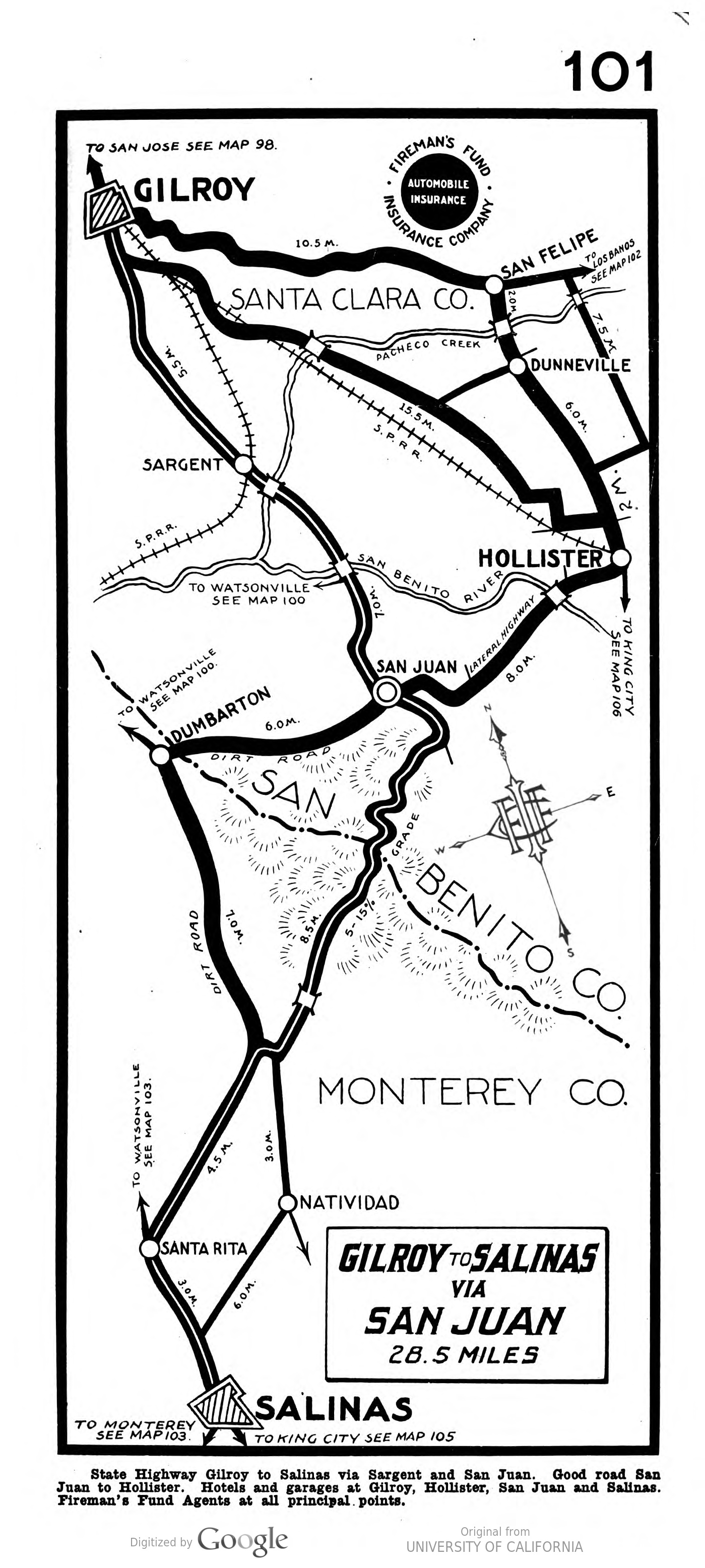
Gilroy to Salinas via San Juan road map, 1916

San Felipe Chapel was built of redwood in Victorian style with "fish-scale shingles, gingerbread molding, and steep-pitched stain glass windows" at Dunneville Corners in 1893, where it remained in active use until 1927. The one-room church was deconstructed by Gavilan College carpentry students in the 1970s and reconstructed as San Felipe Community Church on the college grounds. Additional restoration work was done on the church, now located near Gavilan Creek, in 2005. Dunneville Store, in existence since 1910 and at one time known for hosting the Grandma's Fried Chicken restaurant, was located at Fairview and San Felipe Roads circa 1980. There was also an old barn surrounded by massive cottonwood trees. A bar and dance hall stood at the intersection from the 1880s until 1979. In 1917 "the hall at Dunneville" hosted a farewell party for local recruits who were headed off to World War I. The soil in the vicinity of Dunneville is Yolo silt loam that was once "extensively planted to orchards of prunes and other fruits, including peaches and pears."

Turner Airfield, later Naval Auxiliary Air Station Hollister and then Hollister Municipal Airport, was located on the Dunneville Road between Dunneville and Hollister in the 1920s.

== Government ==
Services are provided by San Benito County. The Dunneville Estates subdivision receives additional services, such as water, as part of Dunneville Estates County Service Area #50.
