= Hollister (surname) =

Hollister is an English family name from the Gloucestershire region of England, now most numerous in the United States. In 1992, it was estimated that there were 2204 Hollister households in the US, 94 in Canada, 81 in Australia, 21 in New Zealand, 3 in Denmark and 371 in Great Britain.

== Derivation ==
One source suggests that the name Hollister is associated with Hollier, in the same way that Baxter is known to be a feminine form of Baker. The IGI suggests that the stronghold of the Hollister name is Wickwar in Gloucestershire, which happens also to be the stronghold of the Hallier surname, rather than Hollier.

The surname dictionaries usually reference a link between Hollister and Hollier and variously describe its meaning as relating to Old English or Old French words meaning "dweller by the holly tree" or "whoremonger". Such dictionaries rarely give any proof of such assertions and so must be considered as speculative.

== List of notable persons with the surname ==
- Alice Hollister, American silent film actress
- Brett Hollister, member of New Zealand Bronze Medal-winning coxed fours at the 1984 Summer Olympics
- C. Warren Hollister, historian and author of "Medieval Europe: A Short History"
- Carroll Hollister, an American classical pianist, who often accompanied Yehudi Menuhin
- Cassius M. Hollister was a 19th-century American law enforcement officer
- Charles M. Hollister was an American football coach
- Dave Hollister, an American R&B vocalist during the 1990s, one-fourth of the R&B quartet BLACKstreet, and later a solo artist
- David Hollister, a Michigan politician
- Di Hollister, along with Christine Milne, first female Greens member of parliament in Australia
- George K. Hollister (1873–1952), American pioneer cinematographer
- Hollister brothers
  - Lyle Eugene Hollister, one of the three Hollister brothers, all sailors in the United States Navy during World War II, who were killed in 1943
  - Richard Jerome Hollister, one of the three Hollister brothers, all sailors in the United States Navy during World War II, who were killed in 1943
  - William Howard Hollister, one of the three Hollister brothers, all sailors in the United States Navy during World War II, who were killed in 1943
- Howard Clark Hollister was a United States federal judge
- John B. Hollister (7 November 1890 – 4 January 1979) was a U.S. Representative from Ohio
- John J. Hollister Jr. was an agriculturalist, banker and California state senator
- John W. Hollister (21 October 1869 – 8 March 1950) was an American football player and coach in the United States
- Lindsay Hollister (born 1977), American actress
- M. E. Hollister (1808–1896), justice of the Idaho Territorial supreme court
- Nancy Putnam Hollister, a Republican politician from the U.S. state of Ohio
- Ned Hollister was an American biologist
- Sara Northrup was the second wife of L. Ron Hubbard, and later known as Sara Northrup Hollister (by marriage)
- Valerie Hollister (born 1939), American painter, printmaker
- William Welles Hollister (1818–1886), California rancher and entrepreneur

== Fictional characters ==
- Amy Hollister, character played by Beth Wohl in the Bones episode The Knight on the Grid
- Captain Frank Hollister, Captain of the Red Dwarf, Red Dwarf sci-fi television series
- Captain James "Cap" Hollister, director of a secret US government agency called The Shop in the Stephen King novel Firestarter
- Ethel Hollister, a character in the Campfire Girls novels
- Clay Hollister, sheriff of Tombstone, Arizona (played by Pat Conway) in the TV series Tombstone Territory
- The Happy Hollisters, children's mystery book family
- Hayley Wilson Hollister, character played by Dana Delany in As the World Turns
- Jack Hollister a.k.a. Skysurfer One, animated character in Skysurfer Strike Force
- John M. Hollister, fictional character who was claimed to have founded Hollister Co. in 1922 as a pacific merchant shop.
- Judge Yvonne Hollister, a Judge in the Judge Dredd series
- Juliet Hollister, founder of the Temple of Understanding
- Lily Hollister, a Marvel Comics character better known as the villain Menace
- Lynn Hollister, a character played by John Wayne in the movie A Man Betrayed
- MacKenzie Hollister, the main antagonist in Dork Diaries.
- Major Mad Dog Hollister, a character played by Bill Bailey, in the movie Water
- Maxwell Hollister, character in The Young and the Restless, played by Sam Behrens
- Park Ranger Hollister, character played by Steve Inwood in Grizzly II: The Predator
