= William Hollister =

William Hollister may refer to:

- William Howard Hollister of the Hollister brothers, American sailors of World War II
- William Welles Hollister, 19th century California landowner
