= Brendon Clark =

Australian bull rider

Brendon Clark (born September 24, 1980) is an Australian former professional rodeo cowboy who specialized in bull riding. In his career, he competed on the Professional Bull Riders (PBR) circuit.

Clark was born September 24, 1980, in Morpeth, New South Wales, on the Hunter River.

He made his PBR debut in the United States in 2003. In 2008, he received six concussions and started riding with a helmet. In 2009, he was hospitalized after a bull stepped on his stomach and chest at the PBR Built Ford Tough Series (BFTS) event in Omaha, Nebraska, resulting in serious internal injuries. He retired from bull riding in 2013. He qualified for the PBR World Finals 10 times in his career; 2003 through 2008 and 2010 through 2013.

Clark has lived for several years in Hollister, California, United States, working as a horse trainer and television commentator. The Brendon Clark Invitational, a PBR Australia event held annually in Newcastle, New South Wales, is named after Clark. In 2023, he was a color commentator for the PBR U.S. Team Series. In 2026, he returned as a commentator for the PBR Team Series.
