= KMPG =

- Hollister, California; United States
- Broadcast area: Gilroy-Hollister
- Frequency: 1520 kHz
- Branding: Radio Bonita 1520

Programming
- Format: Regional Mexican

Ownership
- Owner: Promo Radio Corp. Ambar V. Meza

Technical information
- Licensing authority: FCC
- Facility ID: 53658
- Class: D
- Power: 5,000 watts (days only); 3,500 watts (critical hours)
- Transmitter coordinates: 36°50′5.8″N 121°25′10.8″W

Links
- Public license information: Public file; LMS
- Webcast: Listen live
- Website: kmpgradiobonita.com

KMPG (1520 AM) is a radio station broadcasting a Regional Mexican format. Licensed to Hollister, California, United States, it serves the Gilroy/Hollister area. The station is currently owned by Promo Radio Corp.

KMPG is the only AM station in California that requires critical hours operation. It must sign off the air at sunset to prevent interference to KOKC in Oklahoma City, Oklahoma, which is also on 1520 kHz.
