= Cassius M. Hollister =

American law enforcement officer

- Born: December 7, 1845: Cleveland, Ohio, United States
- Died: October 18, 1884 (aged 38): Caldwell, Kansas, United States
- Other name: "Cash"
- Relatives: Sadia Rhodes (wife); Wildie Hollister (son)
- Police career
- Department: U.S. Marshal
- Service years: 1879 – October 18, 1884
- Rank: Deputy U.S. Marshal (also Mayor of Caldwell, Kansas)
- Awards: Honoured on the National Law Enforcement Officers Memorial in Washington, DC

Cassius M. "Cash" Hollister (December 7, 1845 – October 18, 1884) was a 19th-century American law enforcement officer and deputy U.S. marshal who served as mayor and sheriff of Caldwell, Kansas, as well as deputy sheriff of Sumner County from 1879 until his death in 1884. During his career, he worked with several well-known lawmen including Henry Brown and Ben Wheeler, who together were active against horse thieves in southern Kansas.

== Early life ==
Born near Cleveland, Ohio, Hollister moved to Kansas in 1877 and worked as a hotel clerk in Wichita and Caldwell, Kansas. The next year, he married Sadia Rhodes and lived in Caldwell for two years before being elected mayor of the city on October 28, 1879; the result of a special election following the sudden death of the town's first mayor Noah J. Dixon the previous month.

He soon became involved in a number of brawls and fistfights over the next few months and, in one incident, he was arrested by town marshal George W. Flatt for assaulting one Frank Hunt and fined a dollar after pleading guilty. Hunt, who would later be appointed a police officer under Hollister's successor, assaulted him two days later and was fined a similar amount. Choosing not to run against candidate Mike Meagher, he was eventually superseded as mayor on April 20, 1880. However, he continued to be involved in street fighting and experienced minor legal problems as a result.

== U.S. Marshal duty ==
In early 1883, he was appointed a deputy U.S. marshal by B.S. Simpson and soon after assisted in the capture of horse thief Frank Horstetter, who was connected to a major cattle-rustling operation in Arkansas City, although the ringleader Jay Wilkinson escaped before he could be caught.

On April 8, he was involved in a large gunfight with Caldwell Marshal Henry Brown, Ben Wheeler and several others near Hunnewell, Kansas, against a gang of cattle rustlers resulting in the death of one outlaw and the wounding of another. He later investigated a murder in the Indian Territory and successfully brought back several suspects.

On November 21, authorities received a report that Chet van Meter, a local resident living on a farm in Chikaskia Township, had beaten his wife on the previous night as well as firing at his neighbors J. W. Loverton and a Miss Doty. The following morning, he severely beat his 15-year-old brother-in-law Albert Banks and began threatening his other neighbors that he would "kill half a dozen of them [in that neighborhood] before he got through."

Arriving in town soon after, Loverton and Banks swore out an arrest warrant against van Meter and Hollister was deputized to bring van Meter in. Advised that he was armed and dangerous, Hollister anticipated trouble and asked Ben Wheeler to accompany him. Arriving at van Meter's home, they found Chet van Meter had gone to his father's house some five miles away. Making their way to the home of S. H. Van Meter, they found his son outside the house armed with a Winchester rifle. With both men getting off the wagon, Wheeler called on van Meter to surrender. While he seemed to be complying with the order, van Meter suddenly brought his gun up as he raised his hands, taking a shot at Hollister. Hollister and Wheeler then fired at van Meter, hitting him a total of seven times before killing him. He was then carried to their wagon with the help of Loverton and Banks and brought into town by Hollister and Wheeler. Bringing the body to the Leland Hotel, it was kept in the front basement while a coroner's jury was summoned.

An inquest was later held investigating the circumstances surrounding the shooting and a jury eventually acquitted them both, the official ruling that van Meter's death was justifiable.

== Death ==
Resigning as U.S. Marshal the following year, he remained deputy sheriff of Sumner County for another month before he was killed by Texas outlaw Robert Cross while attempting to take him into custody on October 18, 1884. Hollister had been attempting to negotiate with Cross, who had kidnapped the daughter of a local farmer; however, he refused to surrender and shot Hollister when he threatened to set fire to his house. With nearly the entire town in attendance, he was buried in a cemetery north of town days later.

Hollister is one of those honored on the National Law Enforcement Officers Memorial in Washington, DC.
