= USS Hollister =

Gearing-class destroyer

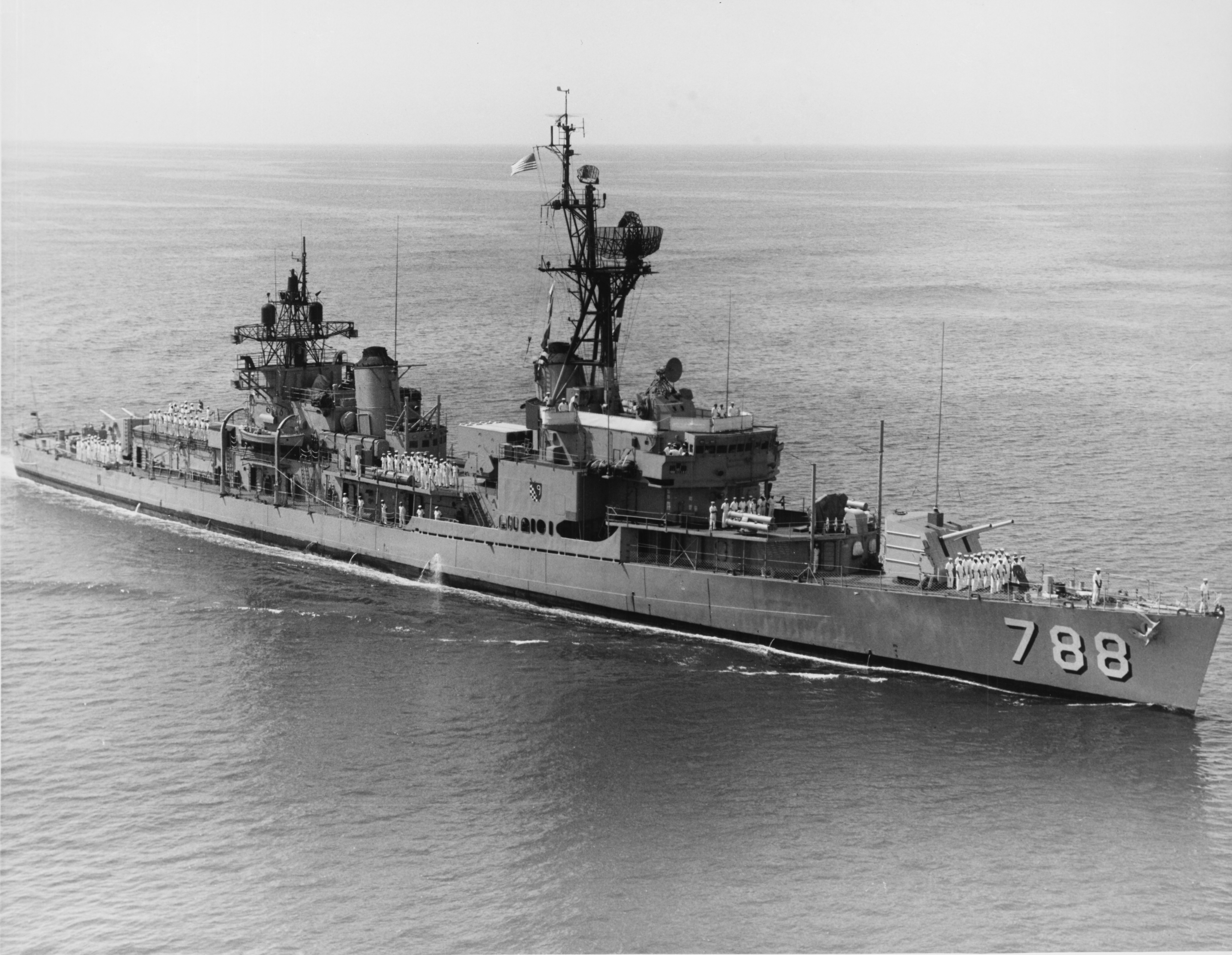
- USS Hollister underway on 2 October 1969

History

United States
- Name: Hollister
- Namesake: Hollister brothers
- Builder: Todd Pacific Shipyards
- Laid down: 18 January 1945
- Launched: 9 October 1945
- Sponsored by: Mrs. Howard J. Hollister
- Commissioned: 29 March 1946
- Modernized: 1961-1962 (FRAM IB)
- Decommissioned: 31 August 1979
- Stricken: 31 August 1979
- Identification: Callsign: NTTE; Hull number: DD-788
- Fate: Transferred to Taiwan, 3 March 1983
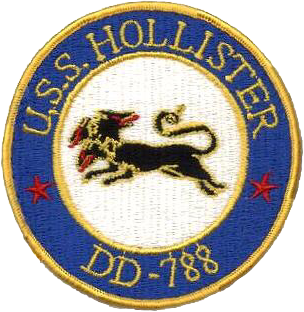
- Badge

History

Taiwan
- Name: Shao Yang; (邵陽)
- Namesake: Shao Yang
- Acquired: 3 March 1983
- Commissioned: 15 November 1984
- Decommissioned: 1 June 2004
- Reclassified: DDG-929
- Identification: Hull number: DD-929
- Fate: Sunk as artificial reef

General characteristics
- Class & type: Gearing-class destroyer
- Displacement: 3,460 long tons (3,516 t) full
- Length: 390 ft 6 in (119.02 m)
- Beam: 40 ft 10 in (12.45 m)
- Draft: 14 ft 4 in (4.37 m)
- Propulsion: Geared turbines, 2 shafts, 60,000 shp (45 MW)
- Speed: 35 knots (65 km/h; 40 mph)
- Range: 4,500 nmi (8,300 km) at 20 kn (37 km/h; 23 mph)
- Complement: 336
- Armament: 6 × 5"/38 caliber guns; 12 × 40 mm AA guns; 11 × 20 mm AA guns; 10 × 21 inch (533 mm) torpedo tubes; 6 × depth charge projectors; 2 × depth charge tracks

USS Hollister (DD-788) was a Gearing-class destroyer of the United States Navy, named for the three Hollister brothers, who were killed in 1943 while serving in the Navy during World War II.

== Construction and career ==
Hollister was launched on 9 October 1945 by Todd Shipyard, Seattle, Washington; sponsored by Mrs. Howard J. Hollister, mother of the three Hollister brothers; and commissioned on 29 March 1946.

=== Service in the United States Navy ===
After shakedown along the California coast, Hollister departed San Diego, California on 9 November 1946 for operations in the Far East. She arrived Shanghai, on 1 December and later that month assisted the Korean Government in the prevention of smuggling. She continued operations in Far Eastern waters until returning to San Diego on 22 June 1947. For the next 14 months Hollister engaged in training exercises and fleet maneuvers along the West Coast.

Hollister departed on 1 September 1948 for her second deployment in the western Pacific where she joined the 7th Fleet on peacekeeping operations. She returned to Long Beach on 24 April 1949 and operated in California waters until July 1950.

==== Korean War ====
Immediately after North Korea invaded South Korea in June 1950, the United States committed its military might to halting aggression. Hollister was among the first reinforcements rushed to the battle area, departing San Diego on 5 July. Operating with Fast Carrier Task Force 77 (TF 77), she served as a screening ship and performed plane guard duty. In mid-September Hollister engaged in support of the highly successful landing at Inchon.

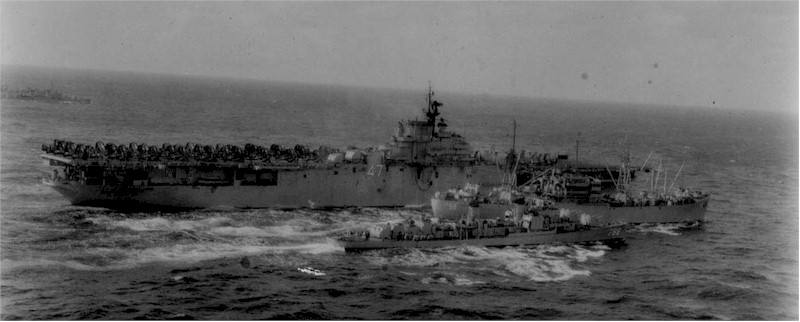
Chara replenishing Philippine Sea and Hollister in 1950

The 3d Battalion, 5th Marines landed at 06:33, 15 September. Later that day General Douglas MacArthur praised the performance saying that "The Navy and Marines have never shone more brightly than this morning." A week later Hollister took Rear Admiral Ewen (TF-77) for a conference with Commander 7th Fleet. In a message to his command, Admiral Ewen echoed MacArthur in praising its work: "The performance of Task Force 77 throughout the Inchon operations has added another page to the glorious history of our Navy and its airpower. It has been made possible only through the determination, the relentless effort and the esprit de corps of a team that is really great. Task Force 77 will sail for the high seas soon and will stay at sea until the North Korean Communists have their bellies full ..." In late September the destroyer was detached for diversionary bombardment in Communist-held areas, effectively weakening enemy positions as American forces smashed north.

In early November 1950, Hollister sailed with the Formosa Straits patrol, returning to Korea in mid-December for support of the Hŭngnam evacuation. She continued support operations, anti-junk patrols and shore bombardment before returning to San Diego on 11 April 1951. Hollister operated in the San Diego area until she returned to Korean action a year later. In late April 1955, she resumed duties with Task Force 77, including fire-support missions, patrol, antisubmarine warfare (ASW) exercises and screening duty. Hollister joined the Formosa patrol in August, but resumed operations in Korea before returning to San Diego on 18 November.

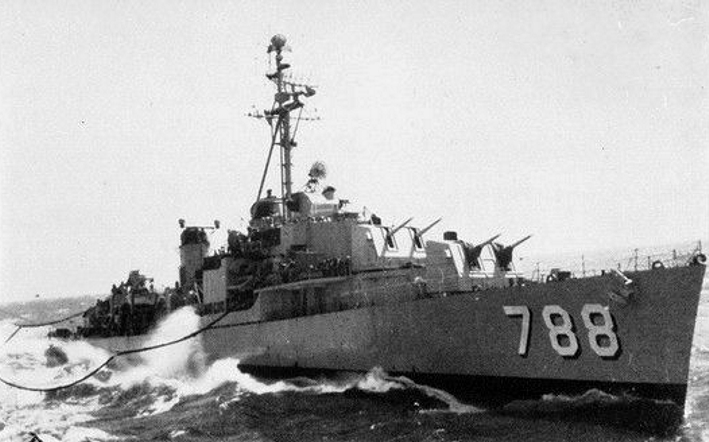
Hollister being refueled in 1954

The veteran ship operated out of San Diego until 21 July 1953 when she sailed for another Far Eastern tour. Hollister engaged in patrols both off Korea and Formosa to make clear America's objective of protecting her allies. After six months in this area she returned home on 19 February 1954. In September, she was deployed to the Western Pacific at a time when the Chinese Communists were stirring trouble in the South China Sea. During the next three months she engaged in hunter-killer operations off Japan and had patrol duty in the South China Sea. In late January 1955, Hollister accompanied the 7th Fleet in the evacuation of Chinese Nationalists from the Tachen Islands. Constant aerial coverage from this powerful carrier force enabled the Nationalists to move from an untenable position. This was considered by some as "the most forthright U.S. action against communism since the Korean War." She returned to San Diego on 13 March for local operations.

Another deployment to the Far East from 27 September 1955 to 11 March 1956, saw Hollister resume her important peace keeping operations in this explosive area. Only six months passed before departing on another tour of duty with the 7th Fleet, this time visiting Samoa, New Zealand, Manus, and Guam en route to the South China Sea. In January and February 1957, she operated with the Formosa Patrol and conducted training out of Japan before returning to San Diego 24 March.

Hollister deployed on 25 October on her ninth Western Pacific tour. In the early months of 1958 she operated with units of the 7th Fleet on Formosa Patrol. Units in this area were placed on alert as a crisis in Indonesia threatened the existing government. The presence of U.S. seapower exerted a powerful influence; the crisis subsided. The destroyer returned to San Diego 23 April but sailed again for the Western Pacific on 18 December to operate with the 7th Fleet. Returning San Diego on 13 June 1959, Hollister spent the remainder of the year engaged in tactical exercises out of San Diego.

Hollister departed on 6 February 1960 for her 11th Western Pacific deployment and began patrol duty in the Formosa Straits. This tour of duty also saw her engaged in various antisubmarine warfare exercises with the Philippine Navy. She returned to San Diego on 14 June to resume training and readiness operations.

Hollister entered the Puget Sound Naval Shipyard on 15 March 1961 for FRAM (Fleet Rehabilitation and Modernization) overhaul, remaining there through the end of the year for an addition of a helicopter deck and hangar aft. After refresher training, she departed Long Beach, California on 7 June 1962 for duty with the 7th Fleet. This cruise came after the Laos crisis and Communist insurgency threatened Thailand.

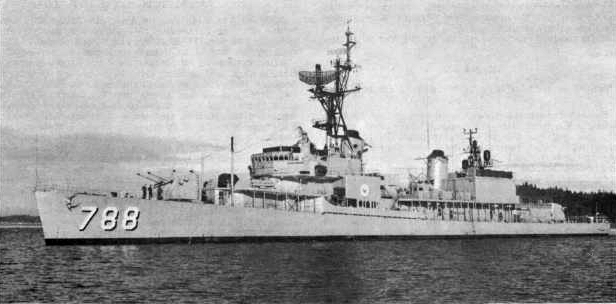
Hollister in 1962

She remained in the Far East until 21 December 1962 when she returned to Long Beach. During 1963 Hollister engaged in shore bombardment exercises and antisubmarine training off the coast of California and in Hawaii water.

In the first half of 1964, Hollister engaged in antisubmarine exercises on the American West Coast. On 19 June, she departed Long Beach, California, with an antisubmarine group bound for Pearl Harbor, arriving on 27 June. After passage to Japan, she took up a station for contingency operations in the South China Sea on 4 August, and received the Armed Forces Expeditionary Medal for her patrol services off Vietnam. After continuing these operations intermittently until 17 November, Hollister began transit from Yokosuka, Japan, to Long Beach on 23 December, arriving on 6 January 1965.

With three months of overhaul complete, the ship engaged in continuous training exercises from 28 May to 20 August. Deploying again to the western Pacific in August, Hollister was ordered to Taiwan Patrol duty on 14 September.

==== Vietnam War ====
By 22 September, she returned to Subic Bay, Philippine Islands, to commence plane guard and anti-submarine screen duties supporting Bon Homme Richard (CV-31). Hollister accompanied the aircraft carrier on "Yankee Station" off Vietnam, giving valuable support to the naval operations exercised in opposing the North Vietnamese Communists.

On 19 December she left the station and arrived in Yokosuka on 30 December, prior to her departure for the United States the following day.

After a six-month repair and training period, Hollister left Long Beach on 25 June for the Far East once again. Arriving on 15 July, she screened carriers and prevented infiltration of supplies to the Viet Cong. Hollister remained in the Far East, where she was on station in May 1967.

After completing a Fleet in-depth overhaul in 1972, Hollister again departed Homeport, this time for her eighteenth deployment to the Western Pacific, carrying a new missile configuration. On 10 August 1972 Hollister became the first U.S. Naval Vessel to ever fire a Surface-to-Surface missile in anger. The missile silenced a North Vietnam Radar site. Only a day before, while on a three ship daylight raid on the Quang Yien storage complex, Hollister received at least 250 rounds of hostile fire. The Task unit destroyed a huge ammunition cache with Hollister returning 193 rounds of fire against enemy shore batteries on the heavily fortified island of Hon Me. This was considered the most daring Destroyer operation of the Vietnam War. The target was destroyed and the Task Unit retired without damage or a single casualty.

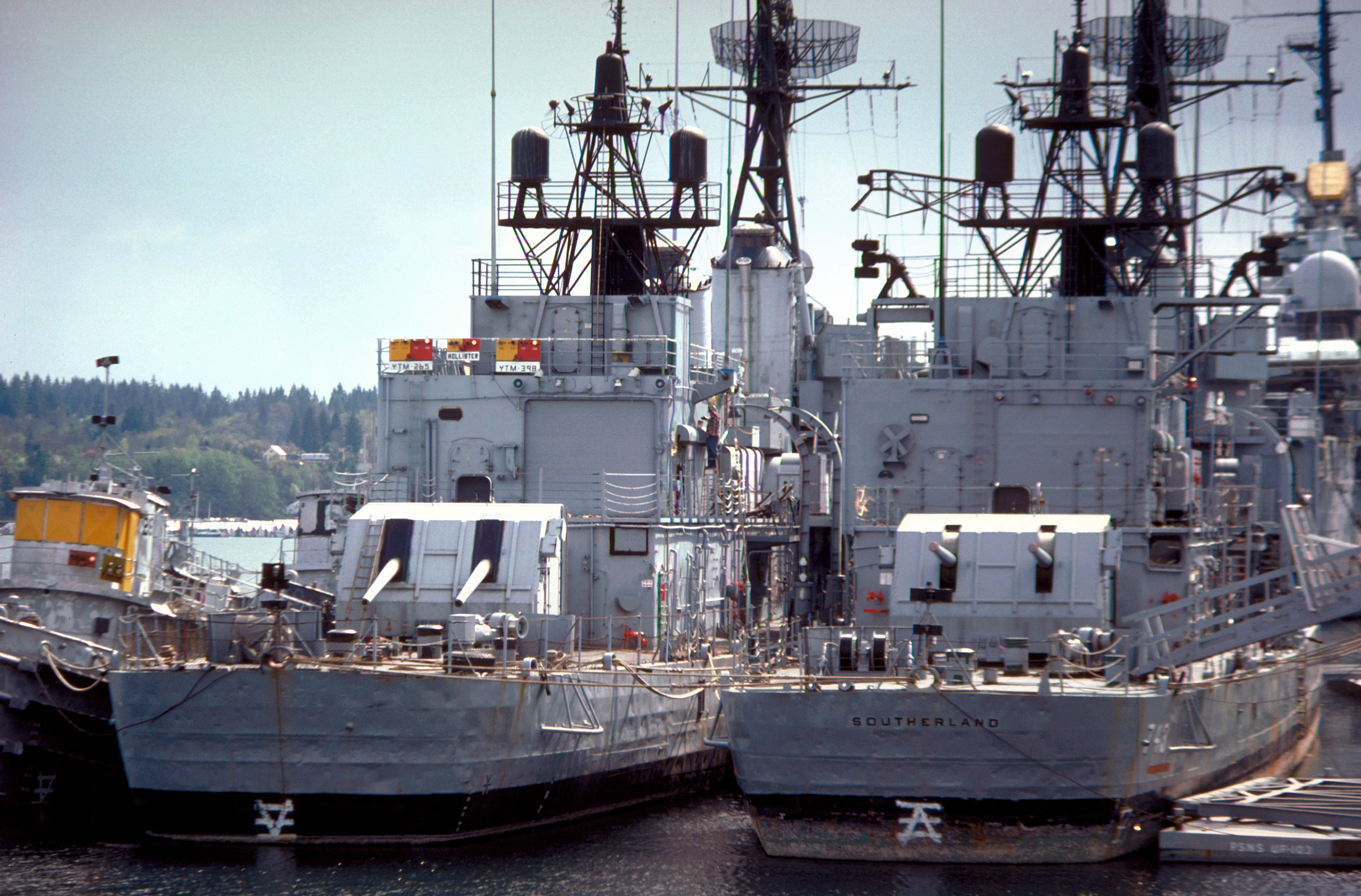
Decommissioned Hollister and Southerland at Puget Sound, 1981

Hollister returned from the Western Pacific for the last time in February 1973. Hollister's record included completing 21 Western Pacific deployments and action in two major conflicts.

In September 1973 "Hollister" was entered into the Reserve Fleet unit Desron 27, NAVSUPACT, Long Beach, California, with four other ships, the USS McKean DD784, USS Higbee DD806, USS DeHaven DD727 and the USS Henderson DD785. She operated as a training vessel for approximately 124 Naval Reservists. She had an active duty crew of approximately 212. During her reserve assignment she maintained high standards of preparedness to meet any assignment to which she was called.

Hollister was decommissioned in September 1979. She was stricken from the Naval Vessel Register on 31 August 1979.

On 3 March 1983, Hollister was transferred to the Republic of China.

=== Service in the Republic of China Navy ===
She was commissioned on 15 November 1984 in the Republic of China Navy as ROCS Shao Yang (DD-929).

On 1 September 1988, Hui Yang was training in the open sea of Zuoying, and her shells on board the ship jammed. She was advised not enter the Zuoying Naval Base as her jammed shells pose a danger to the dangerous goods but she did moored in the base despite the warning. On the next day, 2 September, there was a non-commissioned officer whom fired her gun by mistake, and the shell directly penetrated the bridge of Shao Yang, killing 2 non-commissioned officers on the spot. The shells finally landed in the storage room of a family member's village. After these two deaths, the weapon commander, gunners and sergeants of the ship were sent to court martial, and an award from Colonel Lei Guangshu was also stripped.

On 26 December 1990, she underwent the Wu-Chin III modernization.

In June 2002, the case of leaking secrets by Liu Yuelong on the ship broke out and Liu was later sentenced to life imprisonment.

She was scheduled for decommissioning on 1 June 2004 at Kaohsiung, Taiwan. After the ship was decommissioned, she was temporarily berthed at the No. 4 Shipyard of the Qijin Navy Base in Kaohsiung Port to undergo disassembly for usable materials.

In mid-June 2006, she served as a target ship for the Han Kuang 22 exercise for naval and air force training, and berthed at the Suao Zhongzheng base. After the exercise of Hanguang 22, the ship was towed back to Qijinhai No. 4 Shipyard.

She was towed out to sea to be sunk as an artificial reef.
