= Hollister Municipal Airport =

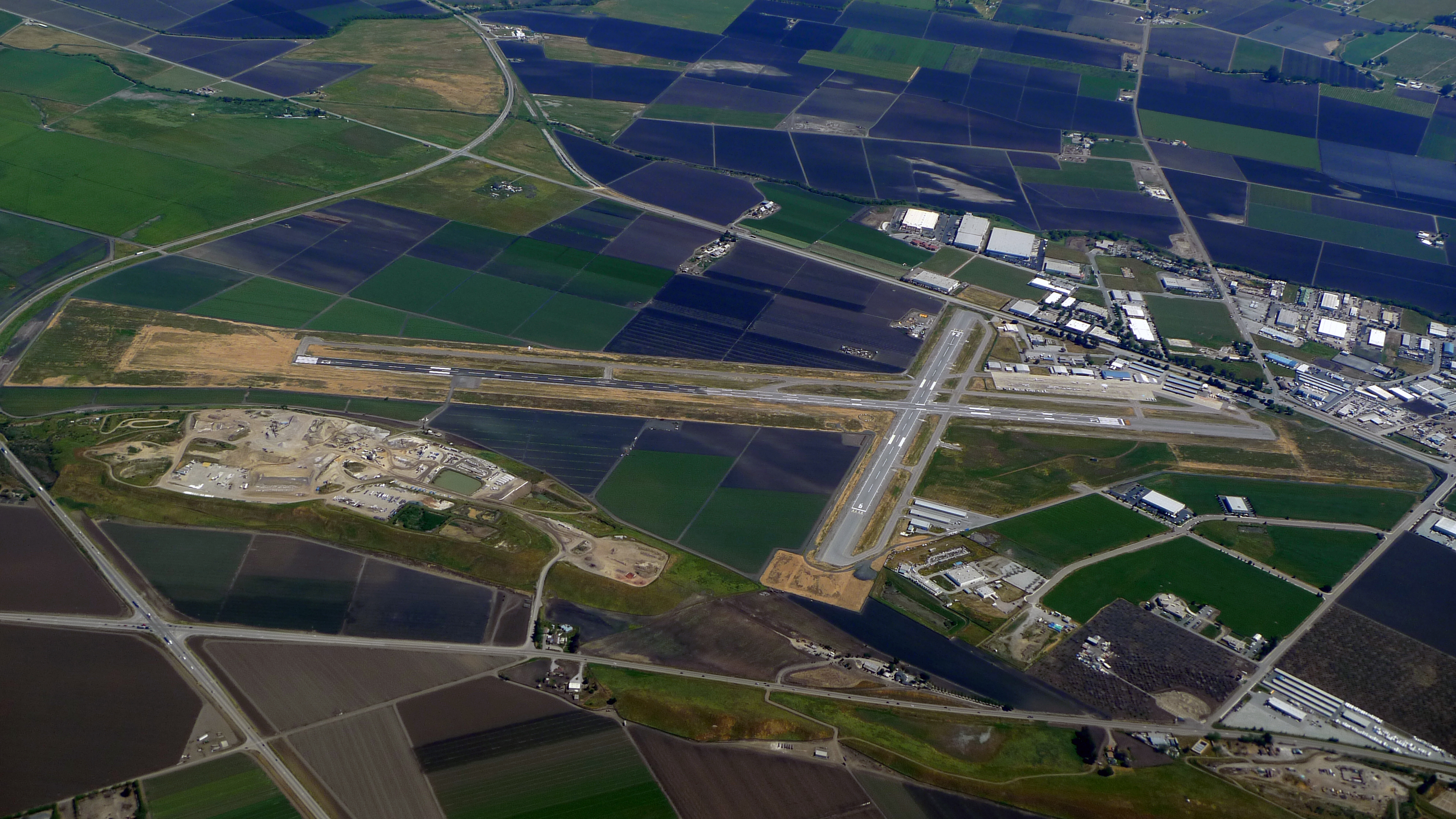
- IATA: HLI; ICAO: KCVH; FAA LID: CVH

Summary
- Airport type: Public
- Owner: City of Hollister
- Location: Hollister, California
- Elevation AMSL: 230 ft (70 m)
- Coordinates: 36°53′36″N 121°24′37″W
- Interactive map of Hollister Municipal Airport

Runways
Direction	Length		Surface
Direction	ft	m	Surface
06/24	3,150	960	Asphalt
13/31	6,350	1,935	Asphalt

Statistics (2007)
- Aircraft operations: 73,000
- Based aircraft: 205
- Source: Federal Aviation Administration

Hollister Municipal Airport (IATA: HLI, ICAO: KCVH, FAA LID: CVH, formerly 3O7) is a city-owned public-use airport located three nautical miles (6 km) north of the central business district of Hollister, a city in San Benito County, California, United States.

Although most U.S. airports use the same three-letter location identifier for the FAA and IATA, Hollister Municipal Airport is assigned CVH by the FAA and HLI by the IATA.

== Facilities and operations ==
Hollister Municipal Airport covers an area of 343 acres (139 ha) which hosts two asphalt paved runways: 6/24 measuring 3,150 x 100 ft (960 x 30 m), and 13/31 measuring 6,350 x 100 ft (1,935 x 30 m).

For the 12-month period ending January 23, 2007, the airport had 73,000 aircraft operations, an average of 200 per day: 98% general aviation and 2% military. There are 205 aircraft based at this airport: 56% single engine, 8% multi-engine, 4% helicopters, 10% ultralight and 22% gliders.

CAL FIRE's Hollister Air Attack Base is located at the airport, providing rapid response to wildfires in San Benito County and surrounding Santa Clara, Santa Cruz and Monterey Counties.

== Gliders ==
Hollister Airport is a regional center for glider activity. Gliders moved to Hollister after the Hummingbird Haven gliderport in Livermore and the Sky Sailing gliderport in Fremont were both closed in 1989. Glider rides, lessons and a non-profit club are located at the airport.

A record for glider flight distance from Hollister was set on June 21, 2008, by Eric Rupp with a flight to Calexico on the Mexican border, 444 miles away.

== History ==
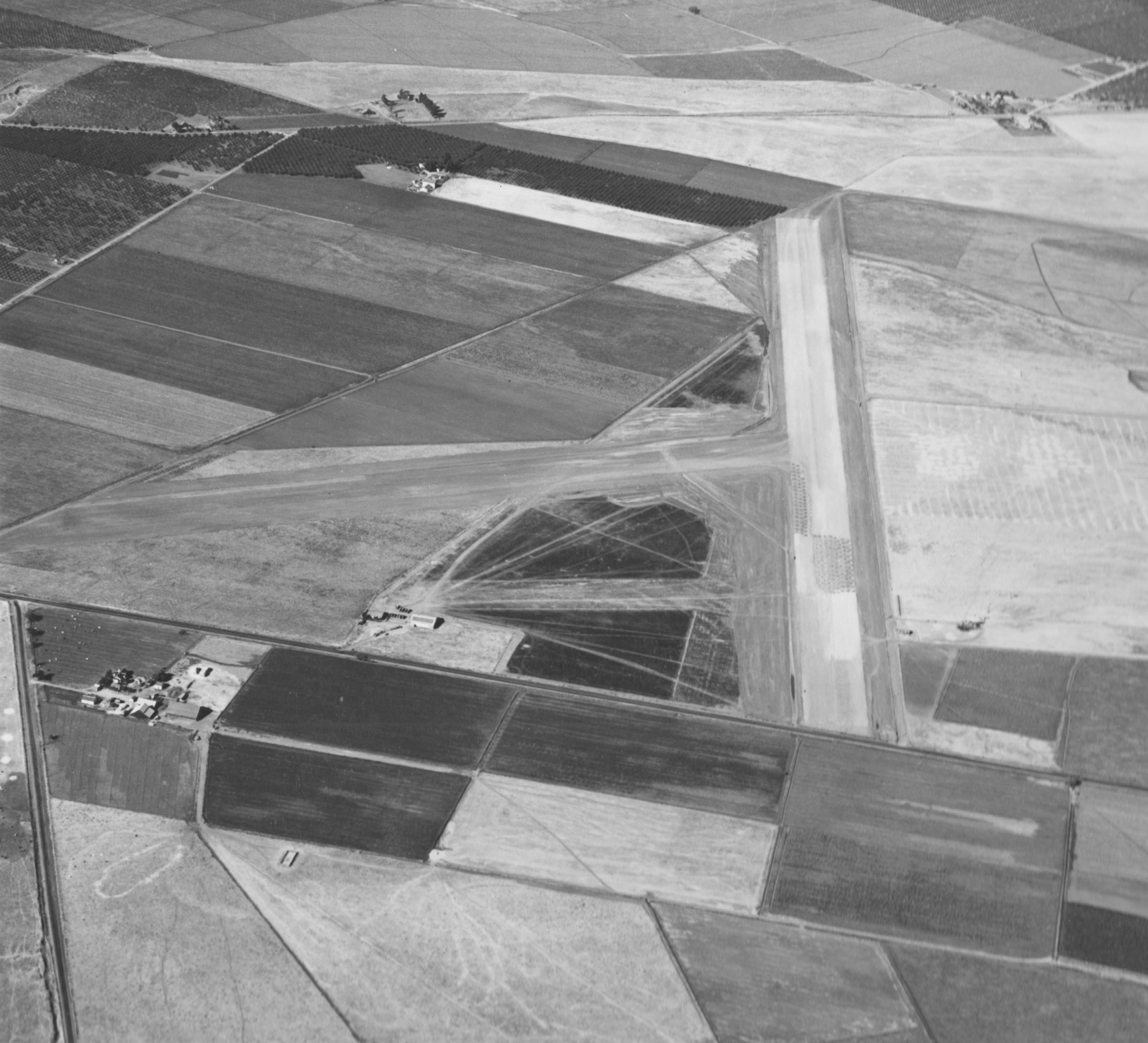
Navy Air Auxiliary Station (N.A.A.S.) Hollister looking west from 4500', September 1942. Bolsa Road is at the top of photo.

Hollister Municipal Airport began as a private grass airstrip in 1912 owned by early aviators Frank Bryant and Roy Francis. The air strip was purchased by local crop duster Everett Turner in the mid-1920s and became known as Turner Field until purchased by the Navy in 1941 and renamed to Navy Air Auxiliary Station (N.A.A.S.) Hollister.

NAAS Hollister remained in operation until June 1946, and was turned over to the city in December 1947.
