= Hollister, California =

City in California, United States

Hollister
- City
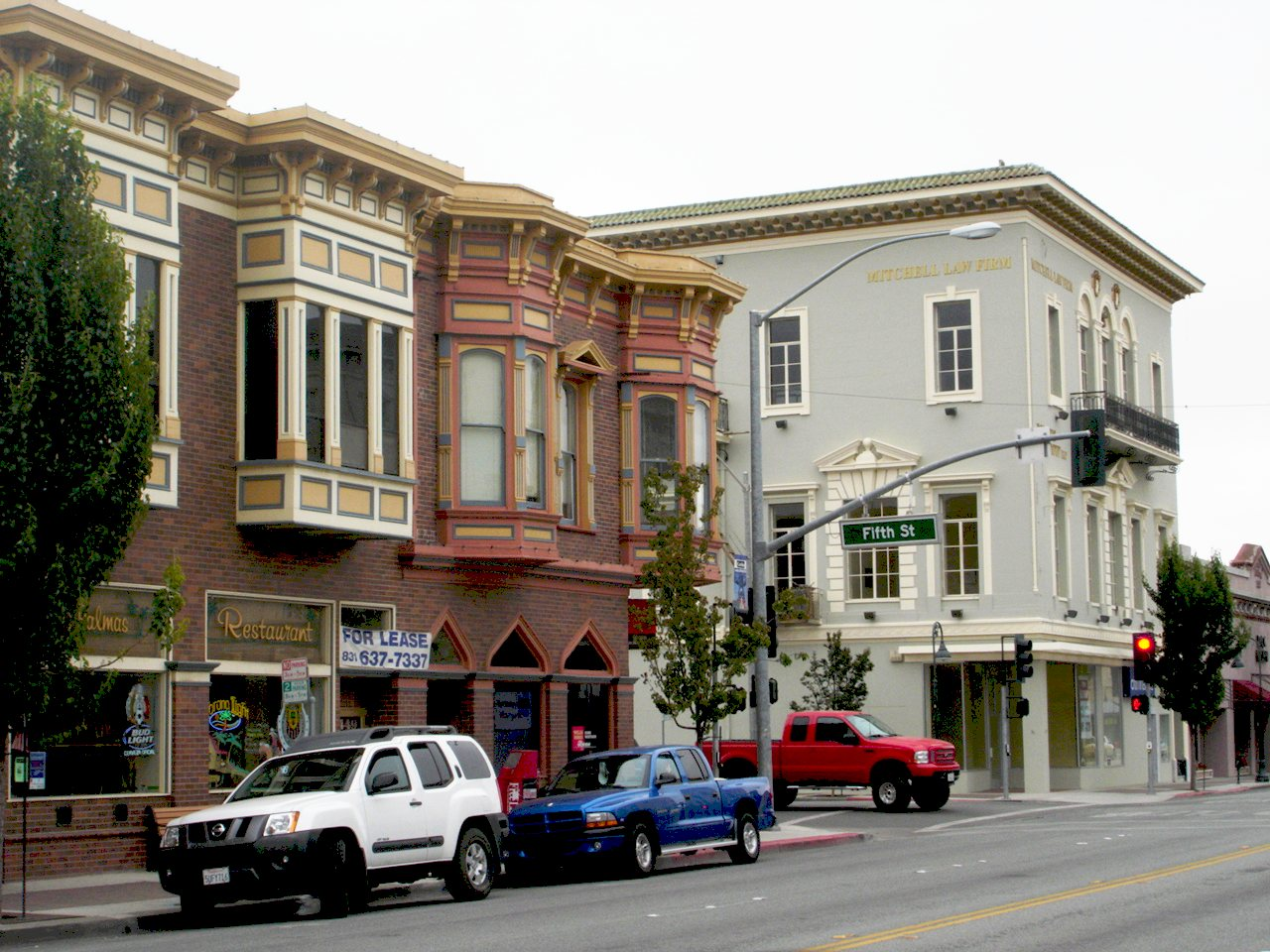
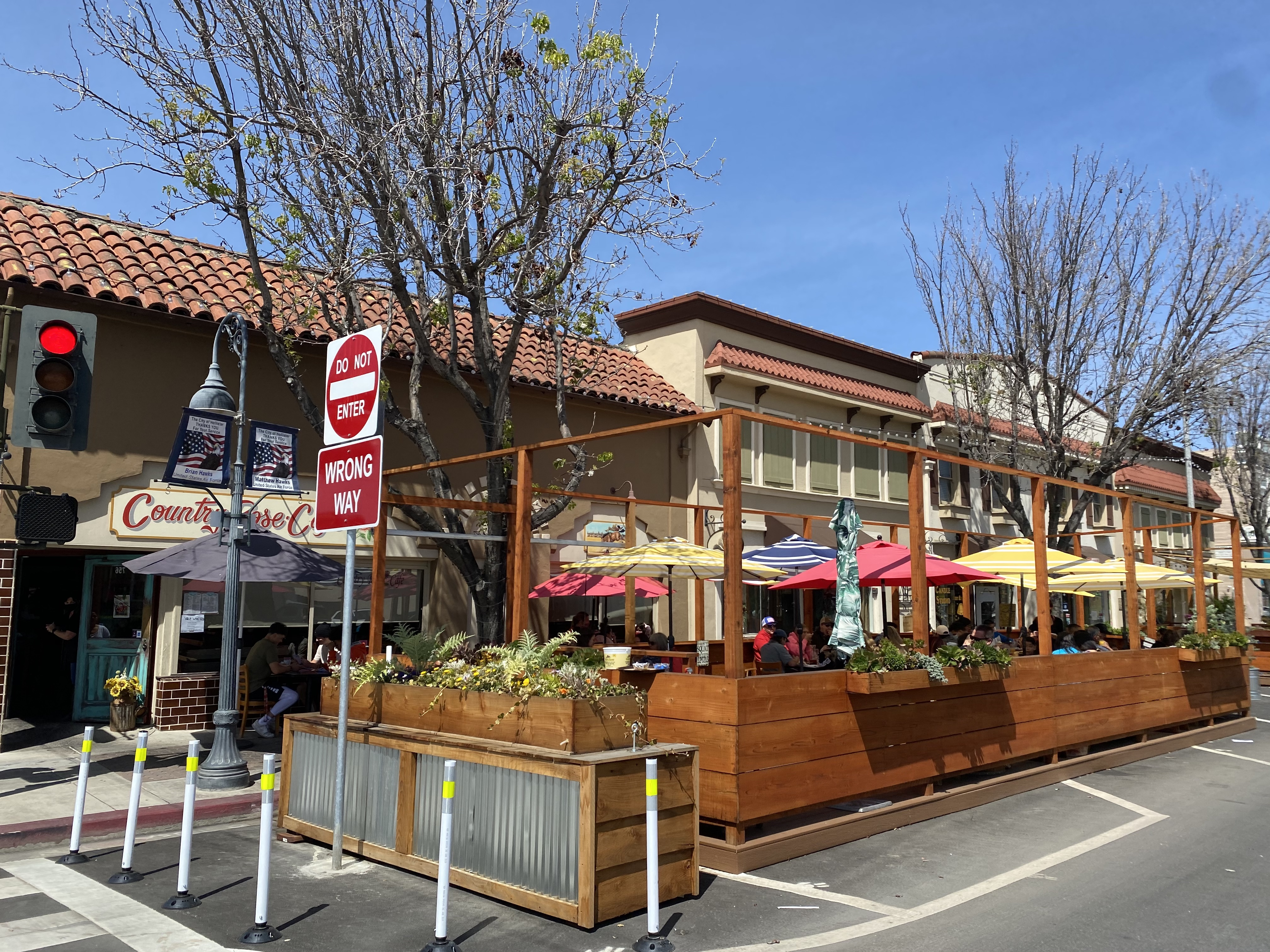
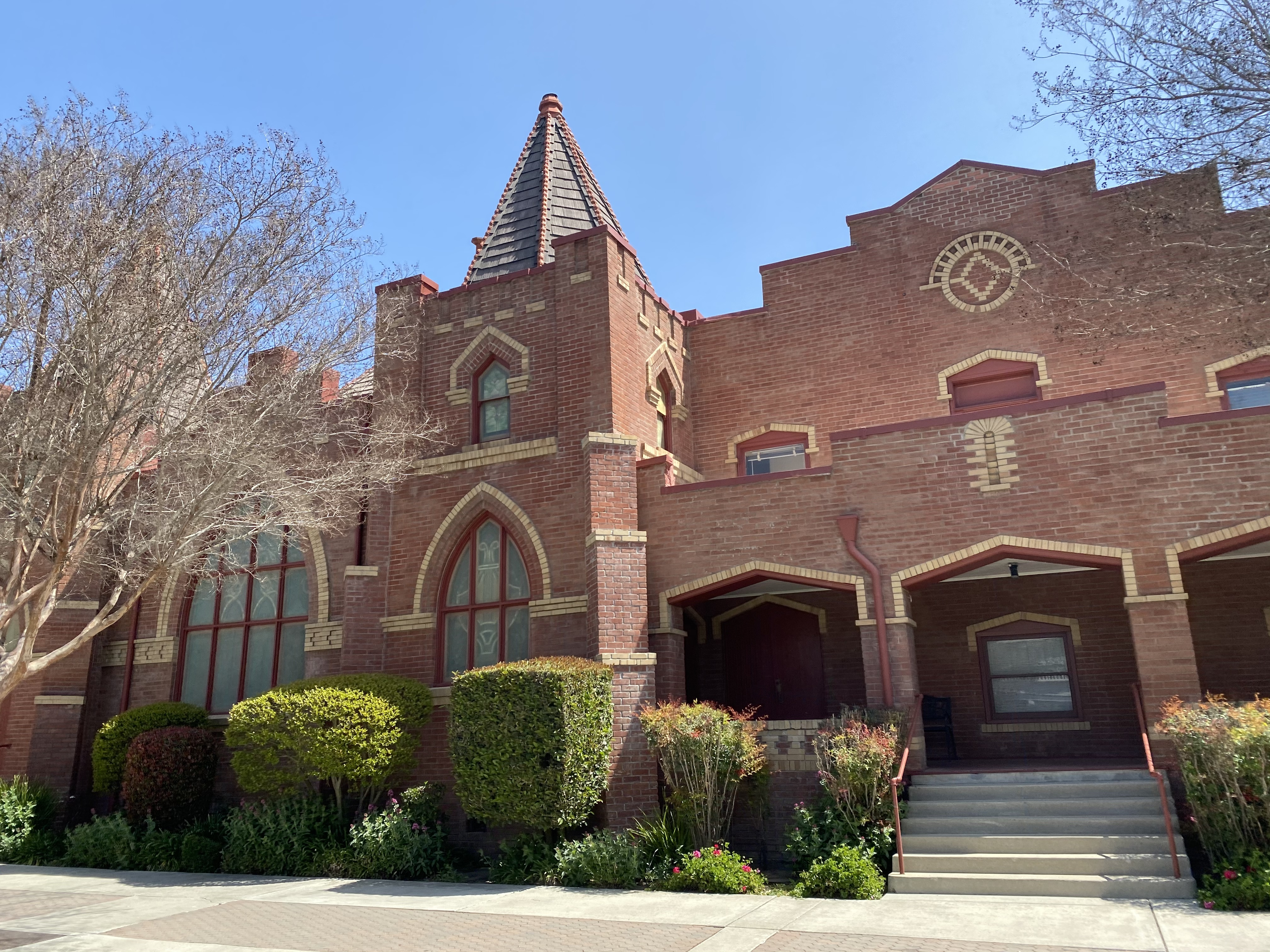
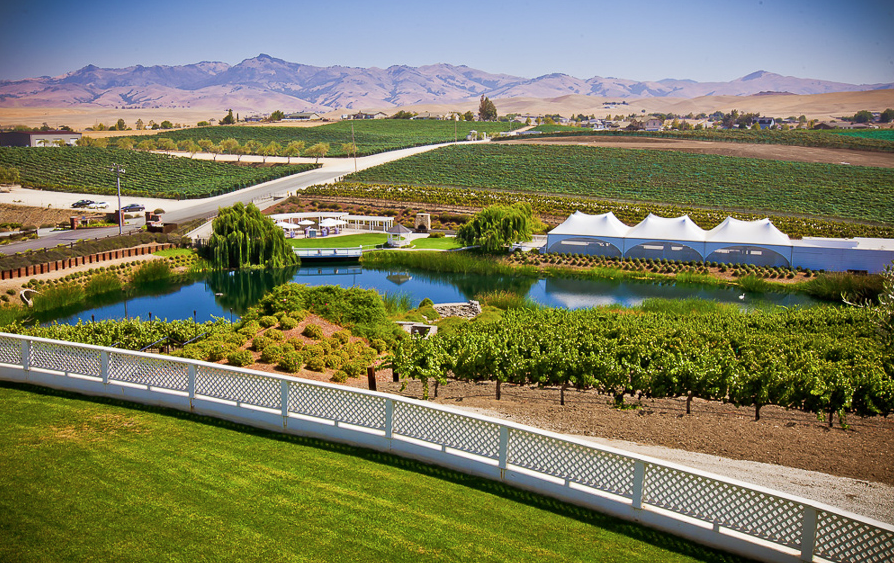
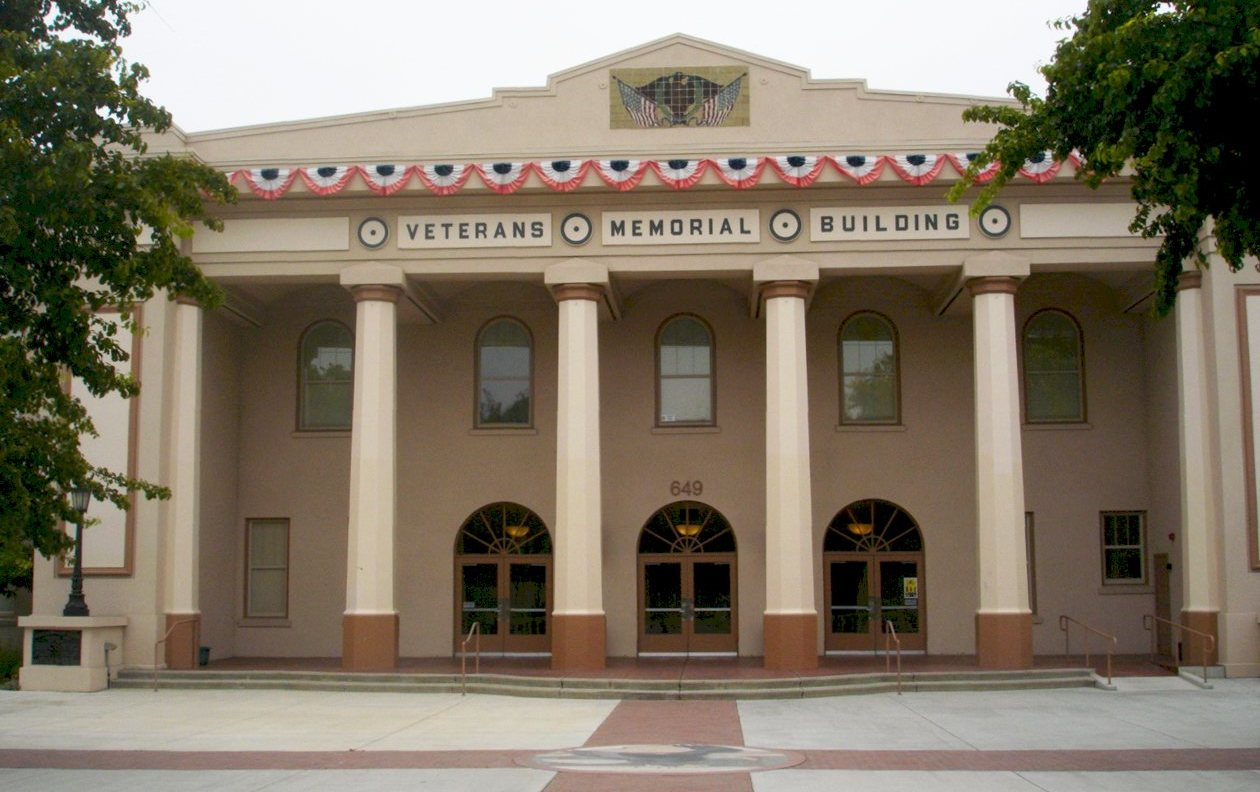
- Downtown Hollister Street-side dining area United Methodist Church Vineyards in Hollister Veteran's Memorial Building

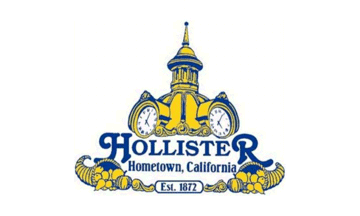
- Flag
- Interactive map of Hollister
- Location within California Location within the United States
- Coordinates: 36°51′09″N 121°24′06″W
- Country: United States
- State: California
- County: San Benito
- Incorporated: August 6, 1872

Government
  - Type: Council-Manager
  - Mayor: Roxanne Stephens
  - State Senator: John Laird (D)
  - Assemblymember: Robert Rivas (D)
  - U.S. Representative: Zoe Lofgren (D)

Area
  - Total: 7.96 sq mi (20.62 km^{2})
  - Land: 7.96 sq mi (20.62 km^{2})
  - Water: 0 sq mi (0.00 km^{2}) 0%
- Elevation: 289 ft (88 m)

Population (2020)
  - Total: 41,678
  - Density: 5,235/sq mi (2,021/km^{2})
- Time zone: UTC−08:00 (PST)
  - Summer (DST): UTC−07:00 (PDT)
- ZIP code: 95023
- Area code: 831
- FIPS code: 06-34120
- GNIS feature IDs: 1658766, 2410778
- Website: hollister.ca.gov

Hollister is a city in and the county seat of San Benito County located in the Central Coast region of California, United States. With a 2020 United States census population of 41,678, Hollister is one of the most populous cities in the Monterey Bay Area and a member of the Association of Monterey Bay Area Governments. The city is an agricultural town known primarily for its local Blenheim apricots, olive oil, vineyards, pomegranates, and chocolate.

== History ==
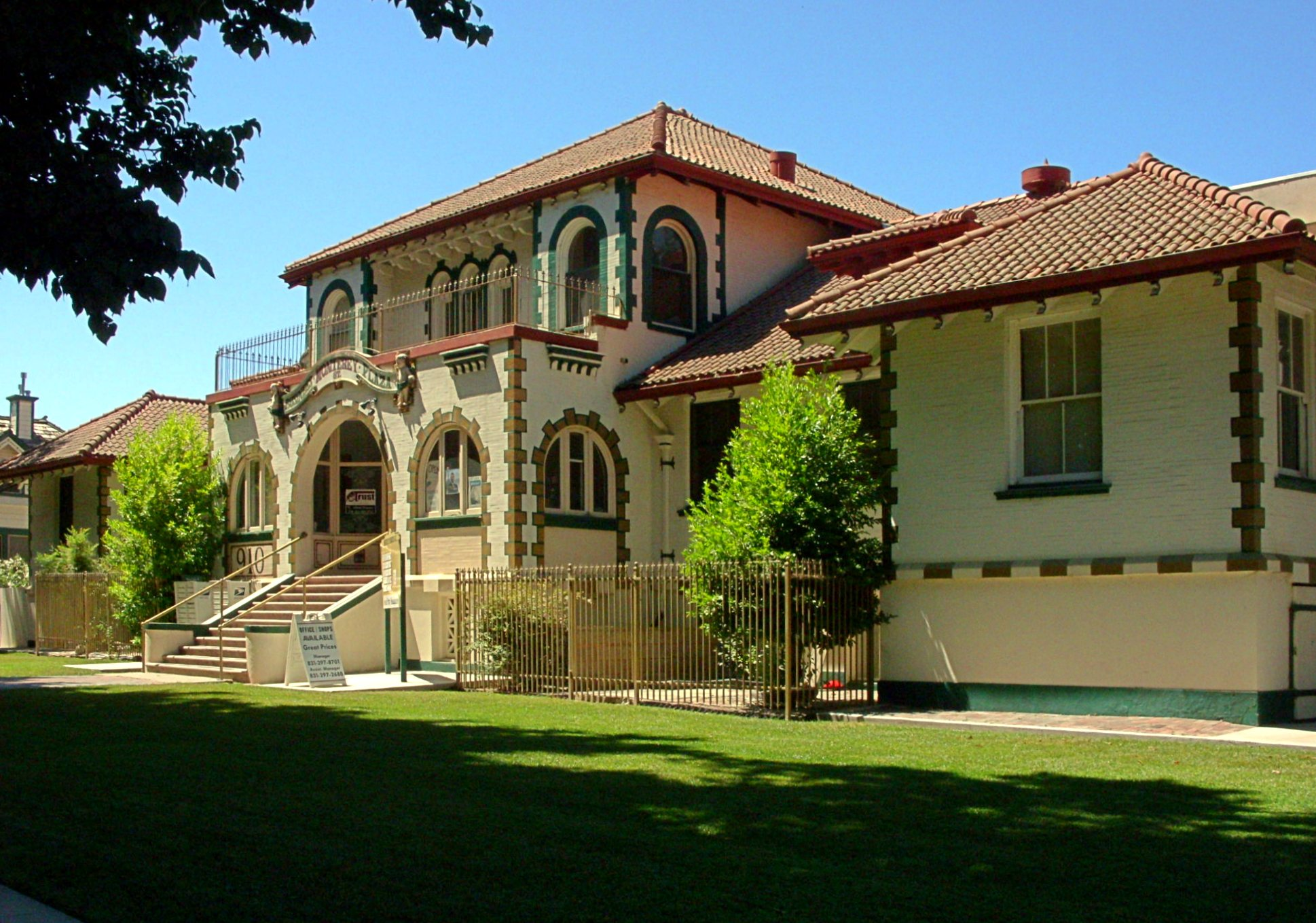
The Mission Revival-style Hazel Hawkins Hospital was built in 1907.

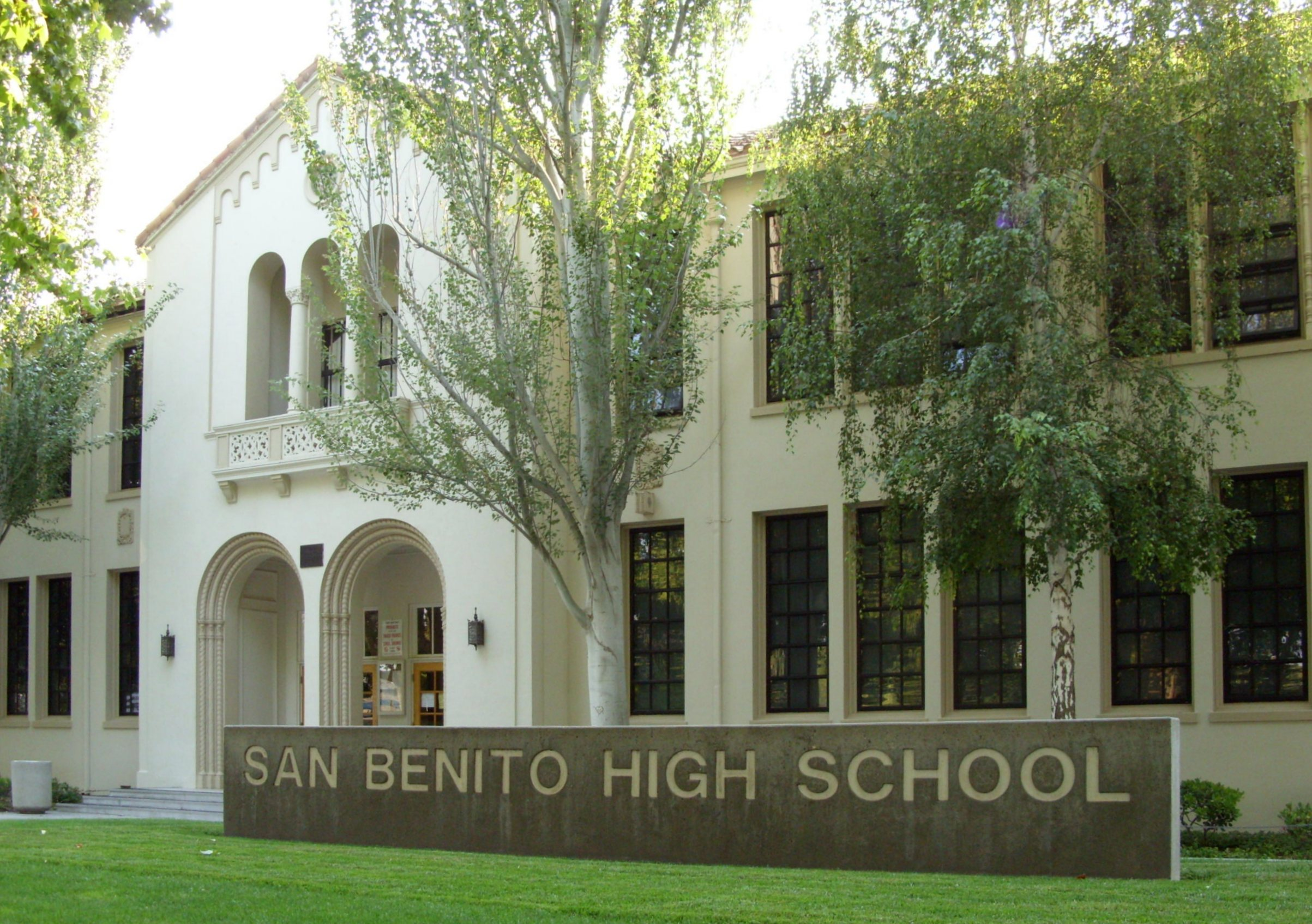
The Spanish Colonial Revival-style San Benito High School, est. 1875

The area of modern-day Hollister was historically inhabited by the Mutsun band of the Ohlone Indians. With the construction of Mission San Juan Bautista in 1797, the Ohlone went into the California mission system.

The town of Hollister was founded on November 19, 1868, by William Welles Hollister on the grounds of the former Mexican land-grant Rancho San Justo. At the time, Hollister was located within Monterey County, until San Benito County was formed by the California Legislature in 1874 from portions of Monterey, Merced, and Santa Cruz counties.

The city is intermittently the site of an annual motorcycle rally around July Fourth. The riot at the original 1947 event was the basis for the 1953 film The Wild One. The rally was revived in 1997 as the Hollister Independence Rally.

In 2005, the Hollister City Council discontinued their contract with the event organizers, the Hollister Independence Rally Committee, due to financial and public safety concerns. The event was canceled in 2006 due to lack of funding for security, but returned in 2007 and 2008. The format of the rally in 2007 differed markedly from previous rallies, with vendors on San Benito Street instead of motorcycles. The bikes were forced to park on side streets and a strict downtown curfew was imposed, with the entire area being locked up at 9:00 pm. This event was popular with bikers and some local establishments profited, but the city footed the bill for much of the expenses and was left liable when organizers filed bankruptcy.

The 2009–2012 rallies were canceled, but the annual rally was reinstated in 2013, and was expected to be profitable for the town. Following a biker gang shooting at the 2014 rally, Hollister mandated that bars must stop selling alcohol after midnight during the 2015 rally. The 2015 rally unexpectedly left the city with a $92,000 loss following a dispute with the promoter. In 2016, the city hired its third promoter in four years; turnout for the 2016 rally was expected to be around 40,000. The San Francisco Chronicle characterized the 2017 rally crowd as "retired, friendly, weather-worn and excruciatingly law abiding", and estimated the motorcycle attendance around 10,000. The 2018 rally was cancelled due to loss of a major sponsor and concerns about the cost of workers compensation liability. However, 2018 and 2019 both saw non-city-sanctioned "rebel rallies". The 2020 rally was cancelled due to the COVID-19 lockdowns. A non-city-sanctioned rally occurred in 2021. The 2021 turnout was smaller than at the official rallies of the mid-2010s. In 2022 the city council declined to sponsor a rally amid a shortage of law enforcement officers.

== Geography ==
=== Climate ===
Hollister has a warm-summer Mediterranean climate (Köppen Csb) that has warmer summers than the Monterey–Salinas area but is cooler than many other inland cities in the Central Valley. Daytime temperatures of around 80 °F (26.7 °C) are typical between June and October, but heat extremes can be much more severe.

Climate data for Hollister, California (1991–2020 normals, extremes 1895–present)
Month	Jan	Feb	Mar	Apr	May	Jun	Jul	Aug	Sep	Oct	Nov	Dec	Year
Record high °F (°C)	84 (29)	84 (29)	91 (33)	99 (37)	105 (41)	108 (42)	119 (48)	110 (43)	111 (44)	107 (42)	94 (34)	81 (27)	119 (48)
Mean maximum °F (°C)	69.6 (20.9)	73.8 (23.2)	79.4 (26.3)	87.7 (30.9)	92.3 (33.5)	97.3 (36.3)	96.6 (35.9)	98.6 (37.0)	99.7 (37.6)	93.2 (34.0)	81.1 (27.3)	69.3 (20.7)	103.9 (39.9)
Mean daily maximum °F (°C)	59.6 (15.3)	62.0 (16.7)	65.6 (18.7)	69.1 (20.6)	73.3 (22.9)	78.0 (25.6)	79.6 (26.4)	81.4 (27.4)	80.9 (27.2)	76.7 (24.8)	66.6 (19.2)	58.9 (14.9)	71.0 (21.7)
Daily mean °F (°C)	49.1 (9.5)	51.3 (10.7)	54.1 (12.3)	56.8 (13.8)	60.8 (16.0)	64.6 (18.1)	66.7 (19.3)	67.9 (19.9)	66.8 (19.3)	62.3 (16.8)	54.2 (12.3)	48.3 (9.1)	58.6 (14.8)
Mean daily minimum °F (°C)	38.7 (3.7)	40.7 (4.8)	42.6 (5.9)	44.5 (6.9)	48.4 (9.1)	51.2 (10.7)	53.8 (12.1)	54.4 (12.4)	52.6 (11.4)	48.0 (8.9)	41.9 (5.5)	37.6 (3.1)	46.2 (7.9)
Mean minimum °F (°C)	29.0 (−1.7)	31.4 (−0.3)	34.1 (1.2)	36.9 (2.7)	41.6 (5.3)	44.9 (7.2)	48.6 (9.2)	48.9 (9.4)	46.2 (7.9)	40.0 (4.4)	32.6 (0.3)	27.6 (−2.4)	26.2 (−3.2)
Record low °F (°C)	14 (−10)	19 (−7)	20 (−7)	23 (−5)	31 (−1)	35 (2)	37 (3)	36 (2)	31 (−1)	22 (−6)	20 (−7)	14 (−10)	14 (−10)
Average precipitation inches (mm)	3.10 (79)	2.65 (67)	2.23 (57)	0.99 (25)	0.44 (11)	0.09 (2.3)	0.00 (0.00)	0.01 (0.25)	0.05 (1.3)	0.62 (16)	1.25 (32)	2.27 (58)	13.70 (348)
Average snowfall inches (cm)	0.0 (0.0)	0.0 (0.0)	0.0 (0.0)	0.0 (0.0)	0.0 (0.0)	0.0 (0.0)	0.0 (0.0)	0.0 (0.0)	0.0 (0.0)	0.0 (0.0)	0.0 (0.0)	0.1 (0.25)	0.1 (0.25)
Average precipitation days (≥ 0.01 in)	8.3	9.6	7.1	4.8	2.1	0.6	0.2	0.2	0.4	2.7	4.6	7.4	48.0
Average snowy days (≥ 0.1 in)	0.0	0.0	0.0	0.0	0.0	0.0	0.0	0.0	0.0	0.0	0.0	0.0	0.0
Source: NOAA

=== Geology ===
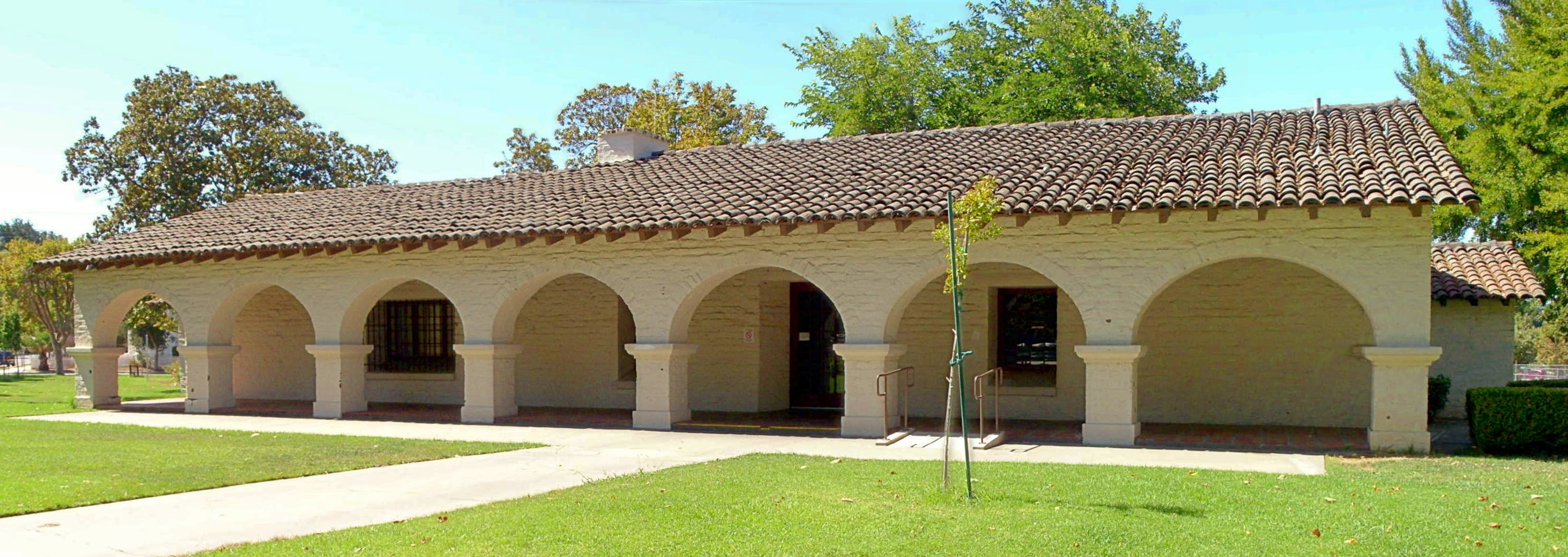
The Mission Revival club house adobe at Dunne Park, built in 1941.

Hollister is well known among geologists because it represents one of the best examples of aseismic creep anywhere in the world. The Calaveras Fault (a branch of the San Andreas Fault system) bisects the city north and south, roughly along Locust Ave. and Powell St. The streets running east–west across the fault have significant visible offsets. The fault runs directly under several houses. Even though they are visibly contorted, the houses are still habitable as the owners have reinforced them to withstand the dislocation of their foundations.

Although there was extensive damage in the town after the 1989 Loma Prieta earthquake, and the governor of California came to visit, this was due to a slip of the San Andreas Fault proper and was not related to the aseismic creep on the Calaveras Fault. The San Andreas Fault (proper) (not to be confused with the Calaveras Fault) runs, at its closest, through San Juan Bautista to the west and through the Hollister Hills State Vehicular Recreation Area to the south.

Hollister is one of at least three California towns to claim the title of "Earthquake Capital of the World," the other two being Coalinga and Parkfield.

Hollister sits on the western foothills of the Diablo Range.

== Demographics ==
Historical population
Census	Pop.	Note	%±
1880	1,034		—
1890	1,234		19.3%
1900	1,315		6.6%
1910	2,308		75.5%
1920	2,781		20.5%
1930	3,757		35.1%
1940	3,881		3.3%
1950	4,903		26.3%
1960	6,071		23.8%
1970	7,663		26.2%
1980	11,488		49.9%
1990	19,212		67.2%
2000	34,413		79.1%
2010	34,928		1.5%
2020	41,678		19.3%
U.S. Decennial Census; 1850–1870 1880-1890; 1900 1910 1920; 1930 1940 1950; 1960 1970 1980; 1990 2000 2010

=== Racial and ethnic composition ===
Hollister, California – Racial and ethnic composition Note: the US Census treats Hispanic/Latino as an ethnic category. This table excludes Latinos from the racial categories and assigns them to a separate category. Hispanics/Latinos may be of any race.
Race / Ethnicity (NH = Non-Hispanic)	Pop 1980	Pop 1990	Pop 2000	Pop 2010	Pop 2020	% 1980	% 1990	% 2000	% 2010	% 2020
White alone (NH)	4,808	7,908	13,246	10,163	9,606	41.85%	41.16%	38.49%	29.10%	23.05%
Black or African American alone (NH)	28	81	387	247	327	0.24%	0.42%	1.12%	0.71%	0.78%
Native American or Alaska Native alone (NH)	X	81	154	118	126	X	0.42%	0.45%	0.34%	0.30%
Asian alone (NH)	X	345	897	824	1,535	X	1.80%	2.61%	2.36%	3.68%
Pacific Islander alone (NH)	x	x	39	38	87	x	x	0.11%	0.11%	0.21%
Some Other Race alone (NH)	347	21	38	38	207	3.02%	0.11%	0.11%	0.11%	0.50%
Mixed Race or Multi-Racial (NH)	x	x	703	535	1,063	x	x	2.04%	1.53%	2.55%
Hispanic or Latino (any race)	6,305	10,776	18,949	22,965	28,727	54.88%	56.09%	55.06%	65.75%	68.93%
Total	11,488	19,212	34,413	34,928	41,678	100.00%	100.00%	100.00%	100.00%	100.00%

=== 2020 census ===
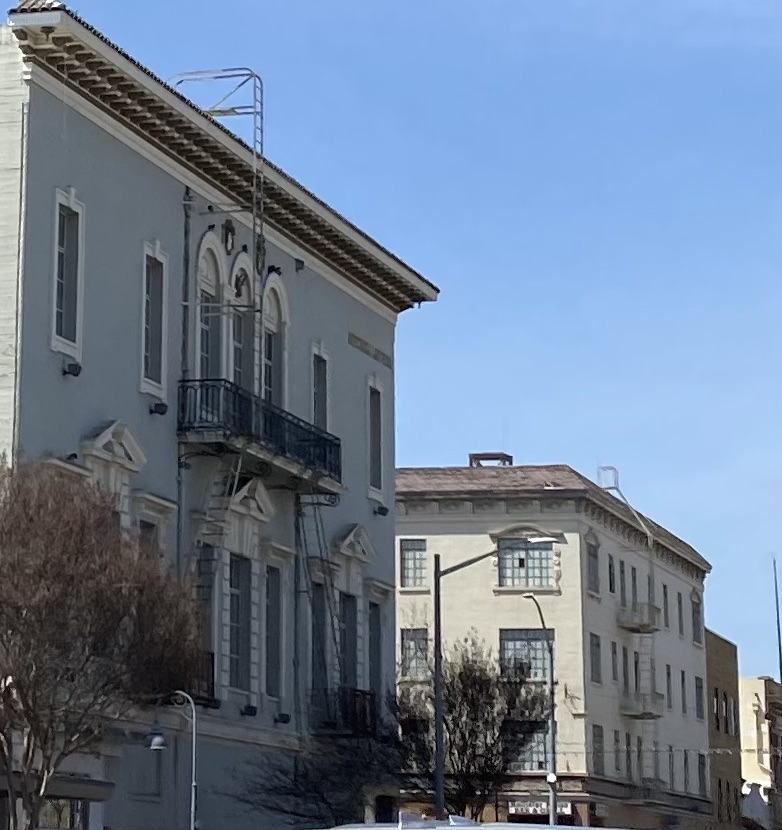
Downtown Hollister.

As of the 2020 census, Hollister had a population of 41,678 and a population density of 5,234.6 inhabitants per square mile (2,021.1/km^{2}). The median age was 34.0 years. 27.7% of residents were under the age of 18 and 10.5% were 65 years of age or older. For every 100 females, there were 97.7 males, and for every 100 females age 18 and over there were 95.7 males.

The census reported that 99.4% of the population lived in households, 0.3% lived in non-institutionalized group quarters, and 0.3% were institutionalized. 99.8% of residents lived in urban areas, while 0.2% lived in rural areas.

There were 11,904 households in Hollister, of which 49.2% had children under the age of 18 living in them. Of all households, 57.8% were married-couple households, 7.6% were cohabiting-couple households, 13.0% were households with a male householder and no spouse or partner present, and 21.5% were households with a female householder and no spouse or partner present. About 13.1% of all households were made up of individuals and 5.9% had someone living alone who was 65 years of age or older. The average household size was 3.48. There were 9,737 families (81.8% of all households).

There were 12,182 housing units, of which 97.7% were occupied, at an average density of 1,530.0 units per square mile (590.7 units/km^{2}). Of occupied units, 64.3% were owner-occupied and 35.7% were occupied by renters. The homeowner vacancy rate was 0.8% and the rental vacancy rate was 1.8%.

=== Income and poverty ===
In 2023, the US Census Bureau estimated that the median household income was $101,979, and the per capita income was $37,253. About 7.6% of families and 10.0% of the population were below the poverty line.

=== 2010 census ===
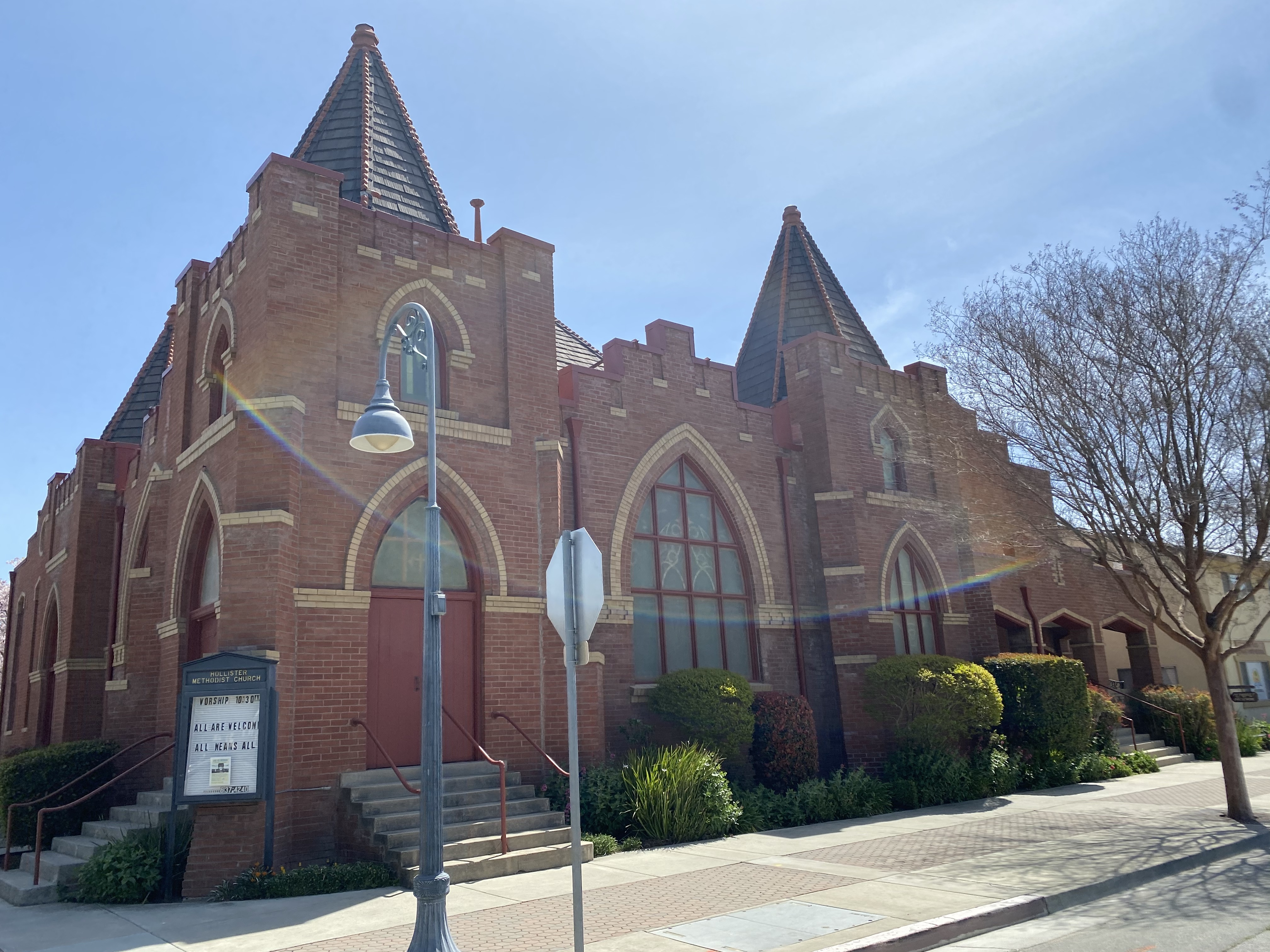
Hollister United Methodist Church, built 1868–69.

The 2010 United States census reported that Hollister had a population of 34,928. The population density was 4,791.4 inhabitants per square mile (1,850.0/km^{2}). The racial makeup of Hollister was 10,164 (29.1%) White, 341 (1.0%) African American, 617 (1.8%) Native American, 929 (2.7%) Asian, 63 (0.2%) Pacific Islander, 10,437 (29.9%) from other races, and 1,780 (5.1%) from two or more races. Hispanic or Latino of any race were 22,965 persons (65.7%).

The Census reported that 34,813 people (99.7% of the population) lived in households, 9 (0%) lived in non-institutionalized group quarters, and 106 (0.3%) were institutionalized.

There were 9,860 households, out of which 5,291 (53.7%) had children under the age of 18 living in them, 5,900 (59.8%) were opposite-sex married couples living together, 1,511 (15.3%) had a female householder with no husband present, 720 (7.3%) had a male householder with no wife present. There were 744 (7.5%) unmarried opposite-sex partnerships, and 55 (0.6%) same-sex married couples or partnerships. 1,324 households (13.4%) were made up of individuals, and 496 (5.0%) had someone living alone who was 65 years of age or older. The average household size was 3.53. There were 8,131 families (82.5% of all households); the average family size was 3.82.

The population was spread out, with 11,076 people (31.7%) under the age of 18, 3,545 people (10.1%) aged 18 to 24, 9,927 people (28.4%) aged 25 to 44, 7,803 people (22.3%) aged 45 to 64, and 2,577 people (7.4%) who were 65 years of age or older. The median age was 30.8 years. For every 100 females, there were 98.7 males. For every 100 females age 18 and over, there were 96.8 males.

There were 10,401 housing units at an average density of 1,426.8 units per square mile (550.9 units/km^{2}), of which 6,030 (61.2%) were owner-occupied, and 3,830 (38.8%) were occupied by renters. The homeowner vacancy rate was 2.3%; the rental vacancy rate was 5.0%. 20,781 people (59.5% of the population) lived in owner-occupied housing units and 14,032 people (40.2%) lived in rental housing units.

== Government ==
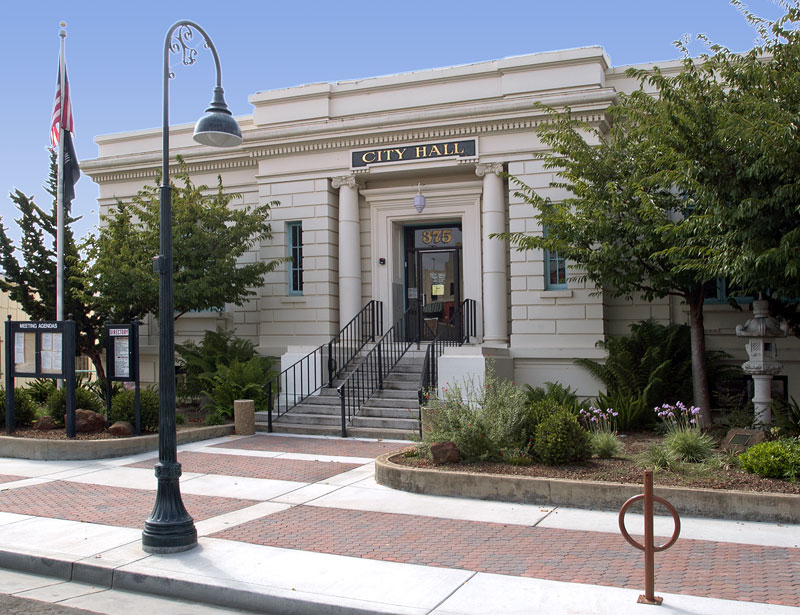
Hollister City Hall is located in a Carnegie Library built in 1906

The city council consists of four council members and an elected mayor who represents the city at large. The first directly elected mayor in the city's history, Ignacio Velazquez, was elected in November 2012.

In the California State Legislature, Hollister is in the 17th senatorial district, represented by Democrat John Laird, and in the 29th Assembly district, represented by Democrat Robert Rivas.

In the United States House of Representatives, Hollister is in California's 18th congressional district, represented by Democrat Zoe Lofgren.

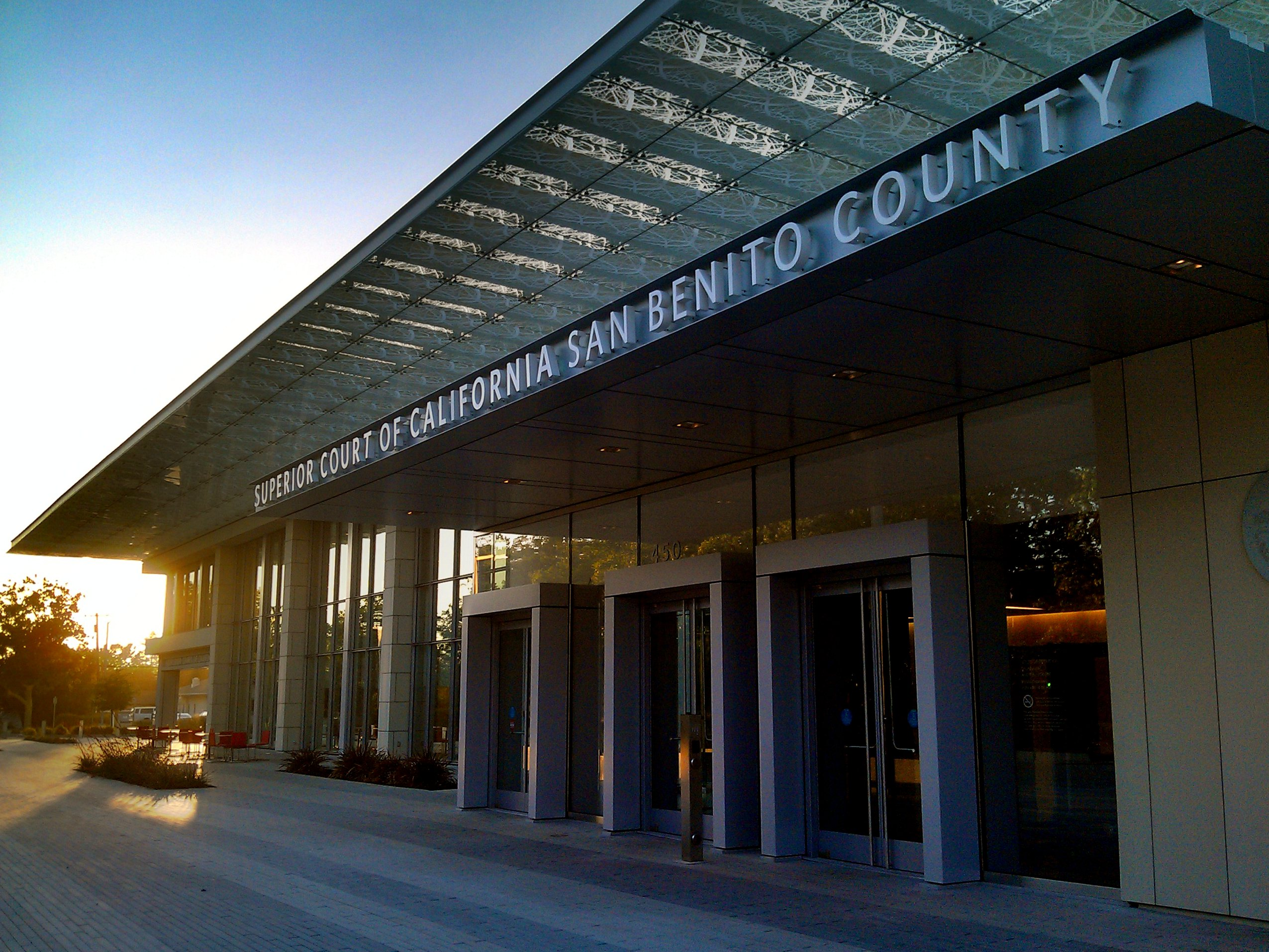
Superior Court of California for San Benito County

Around early 2014, Hollister hired four additional police officers to battle a perceived increase in methamphetamine use. In addition, the early 2010s saw an increase in heroin use among young adults, possibly related to tighter regulation of prescription drugs such as Oxycontin which have similar effects to heroin. Furthermore, youth violence spiked around 2013 and 2014.

=== Confusion with Hollister Co. ===
Hollister Co. is an American lifestyle brand by Abercrombie & Fitch Co. that projects a Southern California image. According to Abercrombie & Fitch, the name Hollister was pulled out of thin air. The city of Hollister is not affiliated with Hollister Co., and Hollister Co. does not manufacture goods or operate a store in the city of Hollister. In 2009, Abercrombie & Fitch threatened to sue local merchants in the city of Hollister for trademark infringement for attempting to sell clothes bearing the name Hollister, prompting at least one merchant to back down.

== Media ==
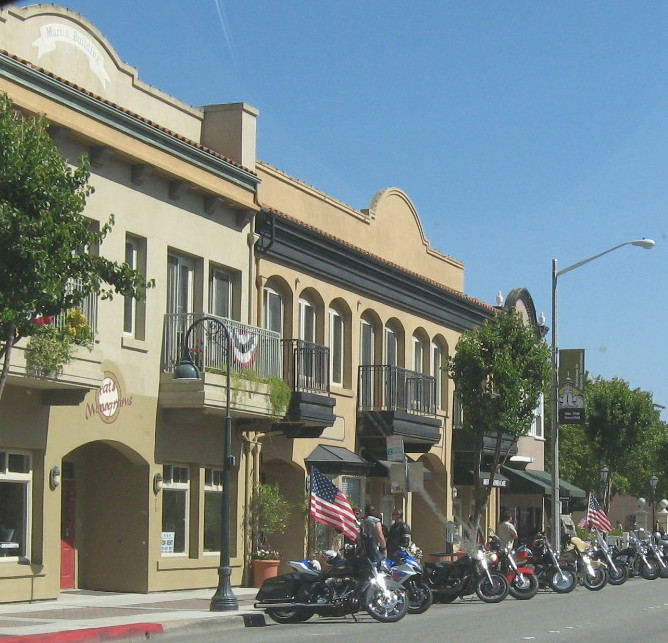
Downtown Hollister

=== Print ===
The Hollister Free Lance is a newspaper now published on Fridays by New SV Media.

Mission Village Voice is a monthly newspaper, which is also online, focused on San Juan Bautista and covering San Benito county events, arts and culture in general. It is owned by San Juan Bautista resident Anne Caetano, who started the paper on her own and produces a creative newspaper with local writers, designers and artists.

=== Television ===
CMAP TV – Community Media Access Partnership operates Channels 17, 18, 19 & 20 on Charter/Spectrum Cable as well as streaming online, offering public access and educational programming to Gilroy and San Benito County as well as offering live local government coverage, including the City of Hollister.

=== Radio ===
The following radio stations are licensed to Hollister:

- KMPG, at 1520 AM daytime, plays regional Mexican music
- KHRI, at 90.7 FM, is an affiliate of Air 1 playing contemporary Christian music
- KXSM, at 93.1 FM, broadcasts a regional Mexican format
- K206BQ, at 89.1 FM, rebroadcasts KLVM
- K265DG, at 100.9 FM, rebroadcasts KPRC-FM

== Infrastructure ==
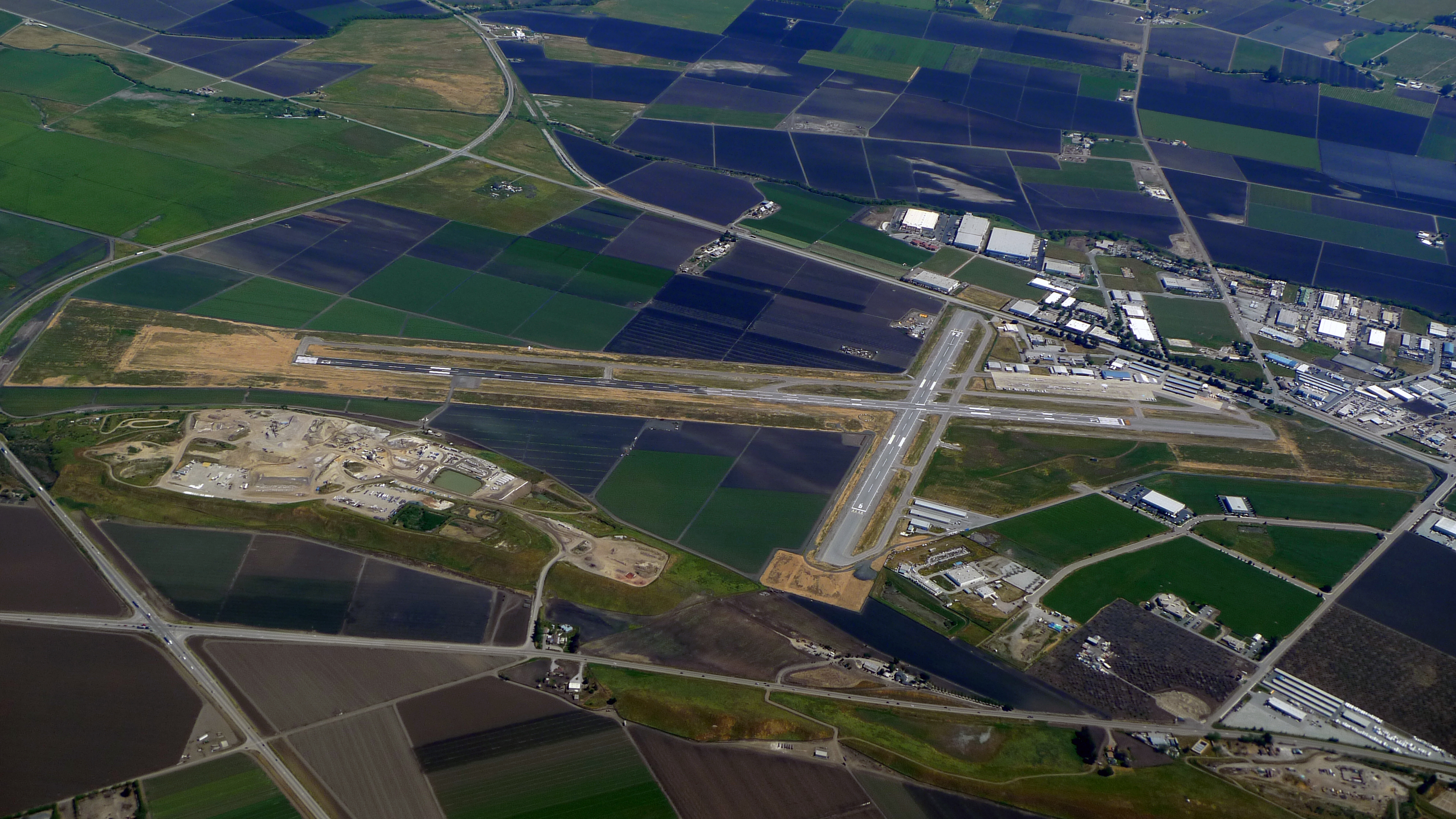
Hollister Municipal Airport serves general aviation.

=== Transportation ===
==== Highways ====
- SR 25 runs northwestward to the San Francisco Bay Area and southeastward to Pinnacles National Park and Coalinga (the latter via State Route 198). Until 1984, Route 25 through Hollister was defined under State law as a segment of State Route 180.
- SR 156 runs westward to Monterey Bay and northeastward to Los Banos in the Central Valley (via State Route 152).
- US 101, 15 miles (24 km) to west, is the nearest major north–south interstate highway, linking the Hollister area to the rest of the Central Coast region, San Francisco to the north, and Los Angeles to the south.
- Interstate 5, 40 miles (64 km) to the east, is a major north–south interstate highway, linking the Hollister area north to Sacramento and south to Los Angeles.

==== Public transportation ====
- San Benito County Express provides local service within Hollister, regional service to San Juan Bautista and Gilroy, where it connects with Caltrain, or on-request, a "Dial-a-Ride" service, and paratransit.

==== Aviation ====
- International Commercial flights are served by San Jose International Airport, about 50 miles (80 km) away in San Jose.
- The Monterey Regional Airport, about 40 miles (64 km) away, connects Hollister to the large metropolitan areas in California, Arizona, Colorado, and Nevada.
- Hollister Municipal Airport is a general aviation facility.

=== Healthcare ===
The State of California Office of Statewide Health Planning and Development defines Hazel Hawkins Memorial Hospital as a General Acute Care Hospital in Hollister with Basic emergency care as of August 22, 2006. The facility is located in California Health Service Area 8 near (NAD83) latitude/longitude of 36°50′02″N 121°23′10″W. As of 2014, the hospital has 113 beds.

== Notable people ==
- Conner Menez, Pitcher, Hollister native
- Brendon Clark, retired Australian bull rider, resident of Hollister
- Annie Law (1842–1889), conchologist
- George H. Moore (1871–1958), city attorney
- Charlie Root (1899–1970), pitcher
- Stanley F. Schmidt (1926–2015), aerospace engineer
- Mikiso Hane (1922–2003), professor of history at Knox College
