= Hollister brothers =

Three sailors in the US Navy who were killed in 1943

The Hollister brothers were three sailors in the United States Navy during World War II, who were killed in 1943. Unlike the Sullivan brothers, they were not all in the same unit.

Lyle Eugene Hollister, born 6 July 1923 in Sioux Falls, South Dakota, enlisted in the Navy on 26 March 1941 at Minneapolis, Minn. Radioman Second Class Hollister first served in Prairie (AD-15) before being assigned to Plunkett (DD-431) and Relief (AH-1). After duty at the Naval Station Key West, Hollister was reassigned to Plunkett. He was reported missing in action as result of an engagement of Plunkett with enemy aircraft during the assault on Anzio, September 1943.

Two years younger than their brother, twins William Howard Hollister and Richard Jerome Hollister were born 22 November 1925 at Sioux Falls, South Dakota. They enlisted in the Navy 2 March 1943 at Minneapolis. Both were serving in Liscome Bay (CVE-56) when that carrier was torpedoed in the Gilbert Islands area 24 November 1943. William died from wounds received in this action; Richard was reported missing and presumed dead.

All three brothers were posthumously awarded the Purple Heart.

== Namesake ==
In 1945, the destroyer USS Hollister (DD-788) was named in their honor.
