= Naval Auxiliary Air Station Hollister =

Coordinates: 36°53′26″N 121°24′26″W

Naval Auxiliary Air Station Hollister is a former United States Navy air station.

Unlike many military airfields, Hollister NAAS was a civilian field before being purchased by the U.S. Navy in early 1942. The first flight on the site took place in 1912 in what was then a pasture. Over time, civilian flying activities at the site increased. In the 1920s the airfield was purchased by a cropduster and renamed Turner Field.

After acquiring the property, the Navy constructed two modern runways of over 4,000 feet (1,200 m) at the site for use as a training facility. The close proximity of Hollister NAAS to the Monterey Bay Torpedo Range allowed for excellent training opportunities.

Hollister NAAS was commissioned in June 1943 and operated through the end of World War II until being placed on caretaker status in October 1945. During its operational period it was an auxiliary field to Alameda Naval Air Station. Carrier air groups preparing for assignment on smaller aircraft carriers trained at Hollister NAAS. The field could accommodate up to four squadrons in training after construction was completed in 1943.
