= Cheryl Miller (actress) =

American actress, musician

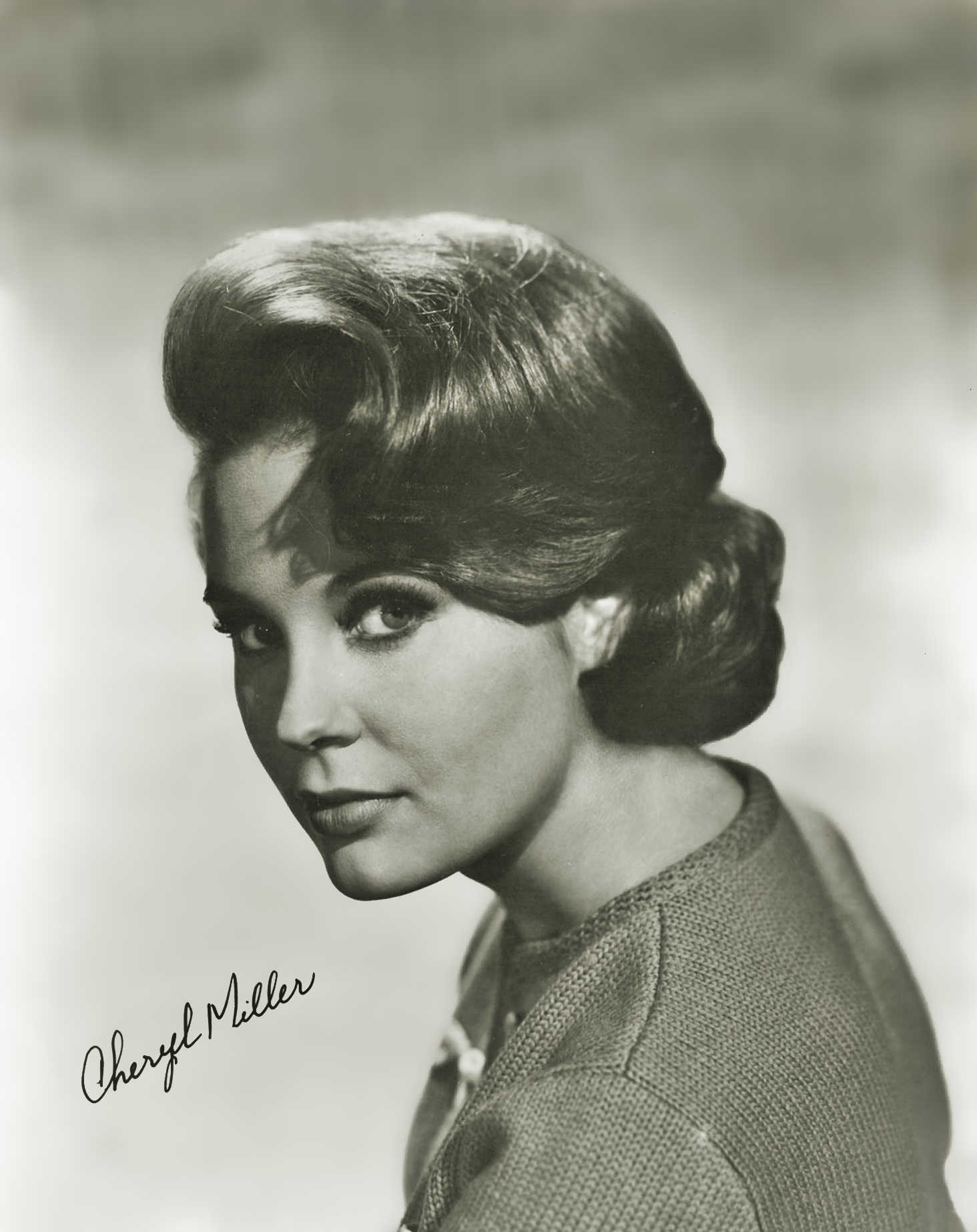
- Cheryl Miller in 1964
- Born: Cheryl Lynn Miller
- Occupations: Actress; musician
- Years active: 1943–2018
- Known for: Clarence, the Cross-Eyed Lion; Daktari; Flipper
- Spouse(s): Stan Shapiro (m. 1968; div. 1971) Robert Seidenglanz (m. 1977; div. 1983) Robert Kasselmann (m. 1989; died 2004)

Cheryl Lynn Miller is an American actress and musician.

== Career ==
The film Casanova Brown (1944) marked her screen debut at the age of 19 days. 1965 was a break-through year for Miller. She was featured with an elephant and a chimp on the hit TV series Flipper. This caught the attention of the director (Ivan Tors) who later cast her in the film, Clarence, the Cross-Eyed Lion. In this film she played Paula Tracy, the daughter of veterinarian Marsh Tracy (Marshall Thompson). The film led to her role again playing Paula Tracy alongside Thompson in the CBS television series, Daktari, (1966–69). In the opening credits, she is shown riding on the back of a lion.

During the summer of 1965, Walt Disney chose Miller as his own contractee, dubbing her "The Typical American Girl". By early 1966, filming began for Daktari in Africa, U.S.A., on a 200-acre ranch about 40 miles north of the Los Angeles metro area.

Later that year, Miller was one of 13 young actresses who were designated Hollywood Deb Stars of 1966. By the summer, she became Miss Golden Globe of 1966 and assisted Andy Williams in the presentation of the Golden Globe Awards. In 1966, she was voted as honorary mayor of Studio City, California.

Miller made many appearances in other television series, including Leave It to Beaver, Our Man Higgins, and The Donna Reed Show. She created the role of Samantha Pudding on the NBC soap opera, Bright Promise.

She also appeared in several other films, including The Monkey's Uncle, with Annette Funicello and Tommy Kirk and Guardian of the Wilderness with Denver Pyle as Galen Clark, John Dehner as John Muir and Ford Rainey as Abraham Lincoln.

== Personal life ==
Miller married Stan Shapiro, a stockbroker, in 1968. She married again in 1979 in Hawaii to the CEO of Compact Video Systems and RTS Systems, Robert E. Seidenglanz, the inventor of the single camera, live television truck, and high definition television. They had a son, Erik, a year later.

== Filmography ==
=== Film ===
Year	Title	Role	Notes
1965	The Monkey's Uncle	Lisa	Comedy film
1965	Clarence, the Cross-Eyed Lion	Paula Tracy	Adventure film
1973	Doctor Death: Seeker of Souls	Sandy	Horror film
1976	Guardian of the Wilderness	Kathleen Clark	

=== Television ===
Year	Title	Role	Notes
1957	Bachelor Father	Nancy	S1 E3: "Uncle Bentley and the Lady Doctor"
1962	Perry Mason	First Girl	S6 E10: "The Case of the Lurid Letter"
1962	Leave It to Beaver	Helen	S6 E14: "The Party Spoiler"
1965	Flipper	Bonnie McCoy	4 episodes
1965	Walt Disney's Wonderful World of Color	Gladys Fuller	S11 E23: "Kilroy: Part 2"
1966-1969	Daktari	Paula Tracy	89 episodes
1972	Love, American Style	Laurie/Ruth	2 episodes
1972	Cade's County	Alana Meredith	S1 E15: "The Brothers"
1973	Emergency!	Rochelle Kayner	S2 E17: "Honest"
1974	Barnaby Jones	Kathy Sayers	S3 E3: "The Challenge"
1974	The Streets of San Francisco	Kimberly Young	S3 E3: "Target: Red"
1974	Run, Joe, Run	Jill	S1 E10: "Sunken Treasure"
1974	The Man from Clover Grove	Millie Swickle	TV film
1975	ABC's Wide World of Mystery	Arlene	S3 E23: "The Deadly Volley"
1976	Gemini Man	Receptionist	2 episodes
1976	Monster Squad	Phoebe Snow	S1 E11: "The Weatherman"
1977	The Six Million Dollar Man	Kim Durbin	S4 E18: "Carnival of Spies"
1978	Police Story	Judy Bivins	S5 E5: "The Broken Badge"
1980	The Misadventures of Sheriff Lobo	Jennifer	S1 E14: "Police Escort"
