= Washburn Fire =

2022 wildfire in Central California

- Part of the 2022 California wildfires
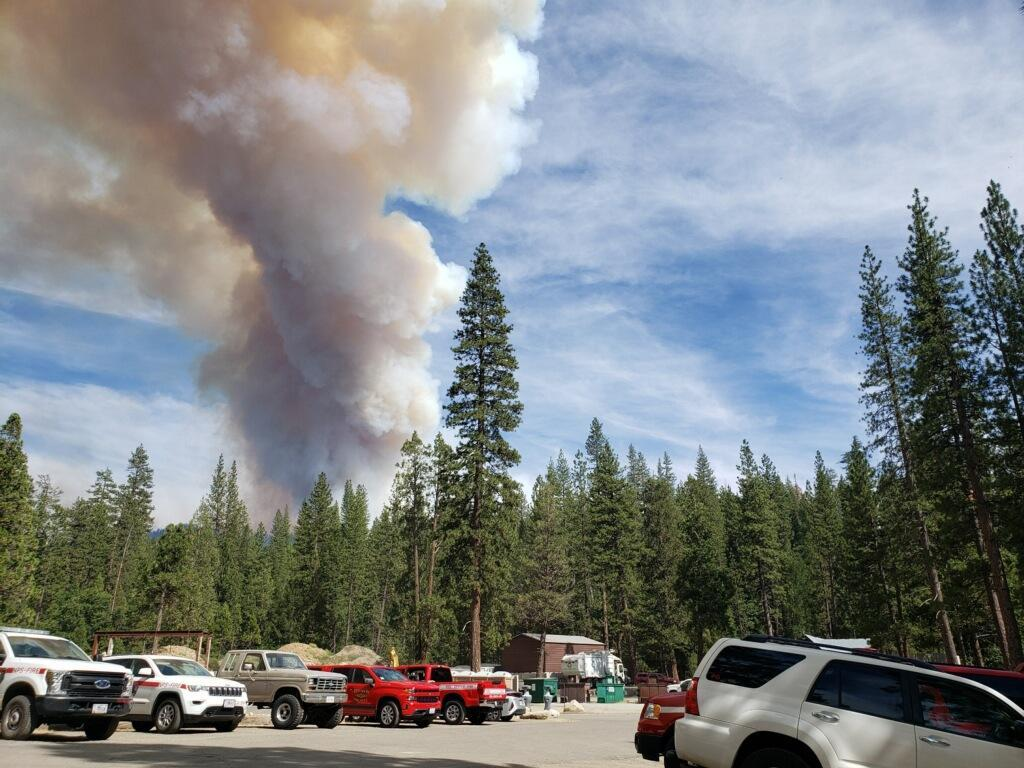
- The smoke plume of the Washburn Fire as seen from Oakhurst
- Date: July 11, 2022 –; August 1, 2022
- Location: Yosemite National Park; Sierra National Forest; California, United States
- Coordinates: 37.449°N 119.614°W

Statistics
- Burned area: 4,886 acres (20 km^{2})

Ignition
- Cause: Human Start

Map
- Location of fire in California.

The Washburn Fire was a wildfire that burned in Yosemite National Park near the Mariposa Grove of giant sequoias. The fire was reported on July 7, 2022, in the lower Mariposa Grove area near the Washburn trail, for which the fire is named. The fire quickly attracted national attention due in part to the role the Mariposa Grove played in the establishment of Yosemite National Park and the National Park Service.

The cause of the fire was referred to as a "human-start". The fire caused evacuations of Wawona and impacted tourism and air quality in the Sierra National Forest and surrounding communities. The fire was fully contained and was put out on August 1 and burned a total area of 4,886 acres (1,977 ha).

== Progression ==
The Washburn Fire was reported in the afternoon of July 7, 2022, near the Washburn Trail in the Mariposa Grove area of Yosemite National Park. Approximately 450 visitors were evacuated before tanker airplanes were cleared to drop wildfire retardant in the area of the grove.

On July 13, the fire expanded into the Sierra National Forest, traveling up the Merced River drainage and away from Mariposa Grove. On that day, the White House assistant press secretary stated that "We are closely monitoring the Yosemite wildfire, and the President has been briefed."

By July 18, almost 1,600 firefighters were assigned to the fire with an estimated cost of fighting the fire up to that point estimated at $16.3 million.

== Effects ==
=== Closures ===
The Mariposa Grove and South Entrance to Yosemite National Park, along Highway 41, were closed. A mandatory evacuation order was given for the Wawona area, including the historic Wawona Hotel. Wawona residents and property owners were allowed to return on Sunday, July 17 as the fire exceeded fifty percent containment and continued to burn mostly to the east of the community. The Mariposa Grove reopened to the public on August 3, 2022.

=== Environmental ===
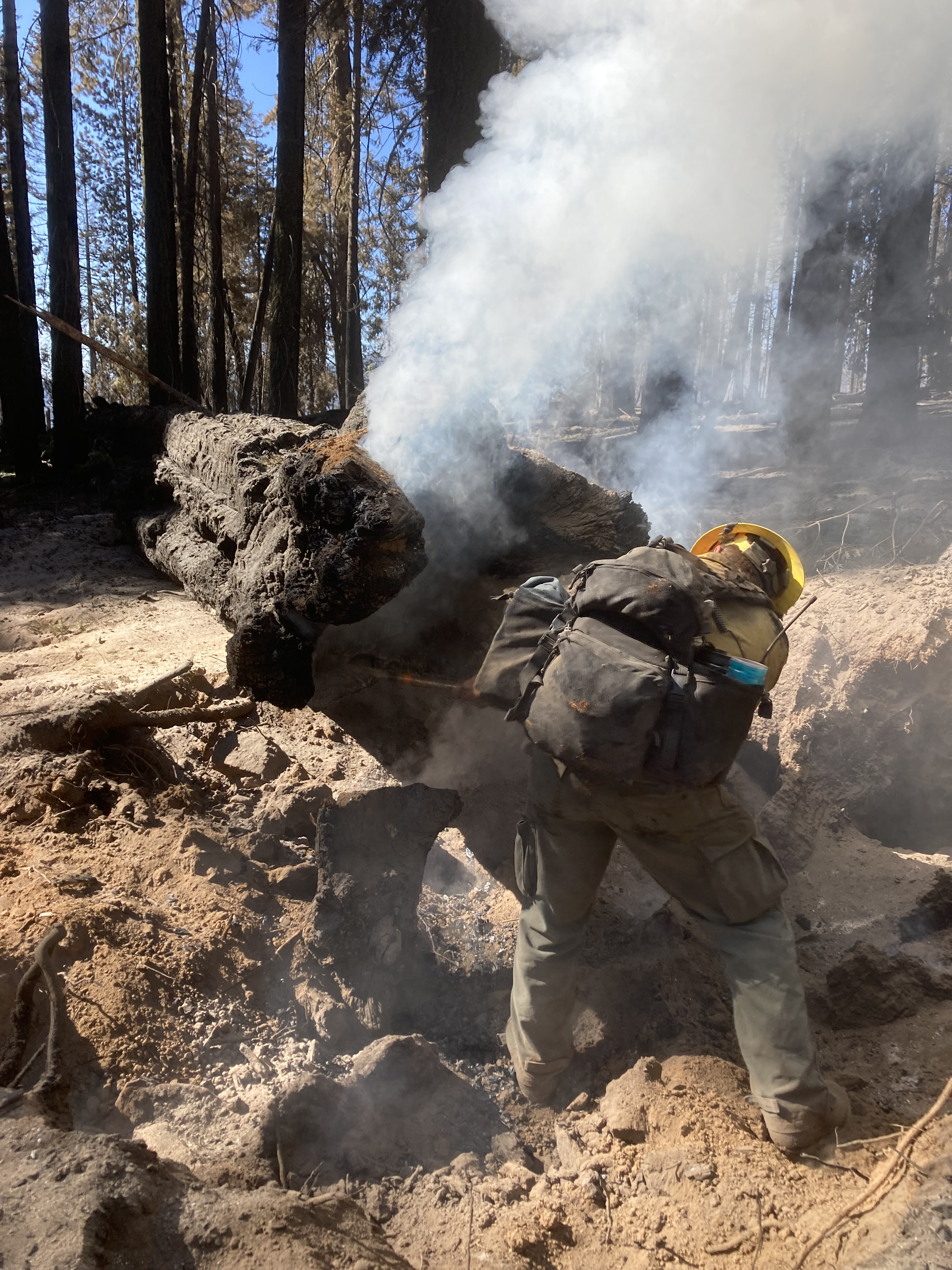
A wildland firefighter performing mop up operations in the Mariposa Grove of Sequoias.

The Washburn Fire threatened the giant sequoias of Mariposa Grove, which has some of the world's largest and most visited trees, including the Grizzly Giant. On July 9, fire crews acted to protect the trees, spraying the trees with hoses. Protective, fire-resistant material was also wrapped around the trunks. Additional preventative measures were taken on July 11, including a fire sprinkler system to increase relative humidity around the Grizzly Giant and the wrapping of the historic Galen Clark cabin.

Fire preparation measures, including fuel reduction over the past 50 years and the restoration of hydrology during the Mariposa Grove Restoration Project, have been effective in preventing permanent damage to sequoias exposed to the fire, which include the Galen Clark Tree.

== Growth and containment ==
Fire containment status Gray: contained; Red: active; %: percent contained;
Date	Area burned acres	Containment
Jul 10	1,591	
Jul 11	2,340	
Jul 12	2,700	
Jul 13	4,261	
Jul 14	4,375	
Jul 15	4,759	
Jul 16	4,822	
Jul 17	4,864	
Jul 18	4,911	
Jul 19	4,863	
Jul 20	4,856	
Jul 22	4,856	
Jul 25	4,866	
Jul 30	4,866	
Aug 4	4,866	

== See also ==
- 2022 California wildfires
- List of California wildfires
