= Guardian of the Wilderness =

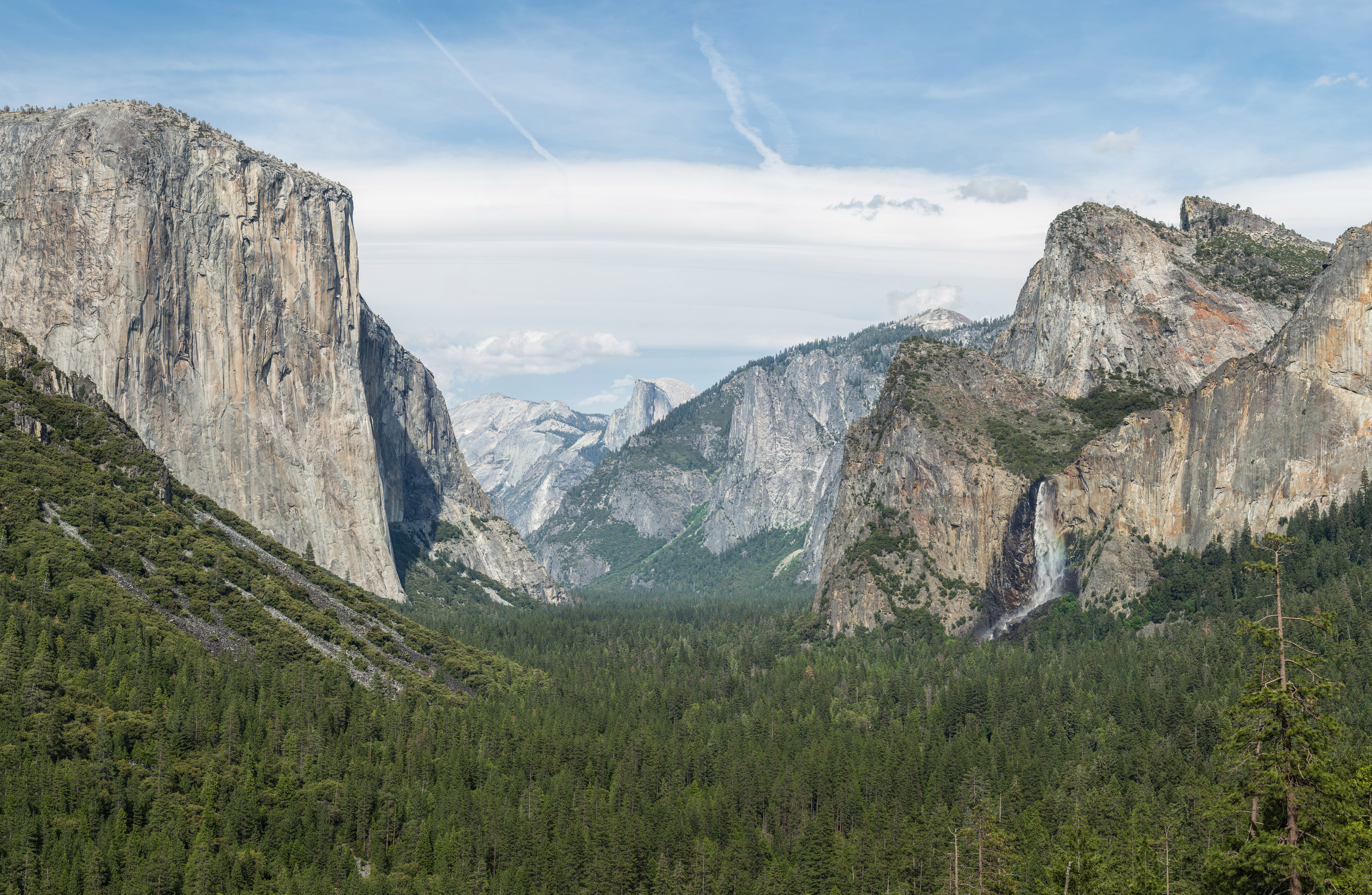
- Yosemite Valley
- Directed by: David O'Malley
- Screenplay by: David O'Malley; Karen C. O'Malley
- Story by: Charles E. Sellier Jr.
- Produced by: Charles E. Sellier Jr.
- Starring: Denver Pyle; Ken Berry; John Dehner; Ford Rainey; Norman Fell; Cliff Osmond
- Narrated by: Ken Berry
- Cinematography: Henning Schellerup
- Edited by: Sharron Miller
- Music by: John Cameron (composer and conductor); Don Perry (music supervisor); Bob Summers (conductor); Yosemite Theme: Music by Bob Summers; Lyrics by Penny Askey
- Production company: Sunn Classic Pictures
- Release date: December 1976
- Running time: 1 hour 52 minutes (112 minutes)
- Country: United States
- Language: English

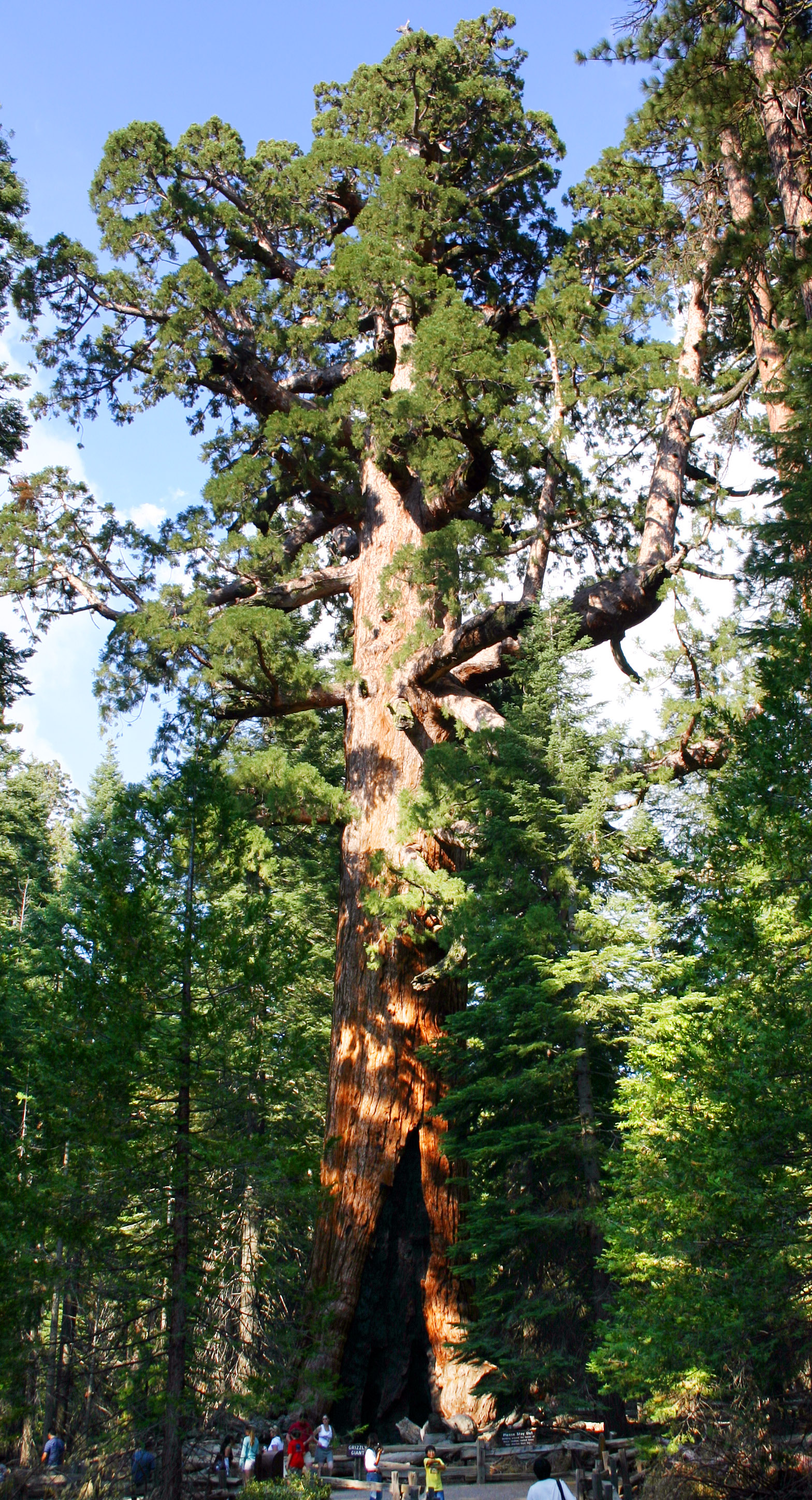
The Grizzly Giant of the Mariposa Grove of Giant Sequoias discovered by Galen Clark (people visible at bottom of photo for scale)

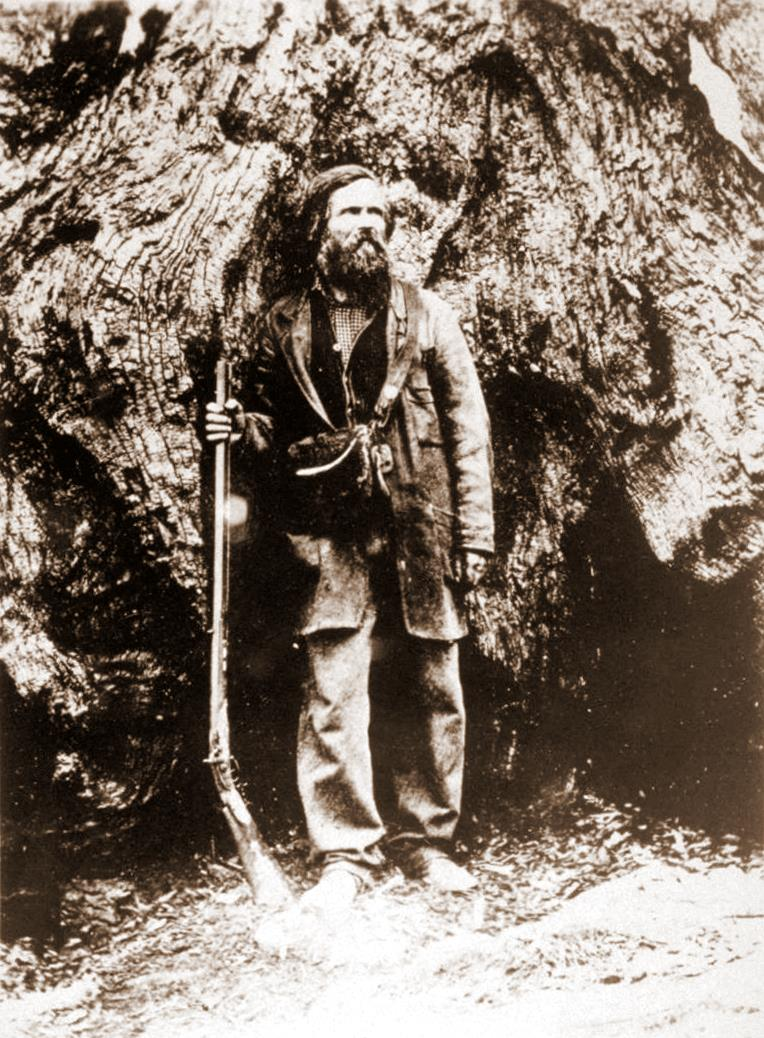
Galen Clark standing in front of the Grizzly Giant tree in the Mariposa Grove circa 1858

Guardian of the Wilderness is a 1976 theatrical narrative film (often alternatively titled Mountain Man) directed by David O'Malley about the true story of Galen Clark, an explorer who successfully campaigned to have the Yosemite area set aside from commercial development, the original forerunner of the American national parks system. Clark was prompted by his dedication to preserving places like the Mariposa Grove of Giant Sequoias, which he discovered, from being destroyed by loggers. The cast features Denver Pyle as Galen Clark, John Dehner as legendary naturalist John Muir and Ford Rainey as Abraham Lincoln. Clark was eventually appointed Superintendent of Yosemite, a position in which he served for more than two decades during which he defined the concept of an American park ranger; his varied history with the valley ranged across 55 years.

A book written by Mark S. Rinehart in 2009 titled Abraham Lincoln on Screen: Fiction and Documentary Portrayals on Film and Television and published by McFarland & Company states that the sequence of the film involving Abraham Lincoln never took place nor did Clark ever travel to Washington D.C.

The film's supporting cast includes Ken Berry, Cheryl Miller, Norman Fell and Cliff Osmond. The screenplay was written by David O'Malley and Karen C. O'Malley from a story by the film's producer Charles E. Sellier Jr. loosely based on the actual events. The music was composed and conducted by John Cameron and the song "Yosemite Theme" features music by Bob Summers and lyrics by Penny Askey. The film was rated "G" and thereby deemed suitable for children, and was shot on location by cinematographer Henning Schellerup, edited by Sharron Miller, and released in the United States in December 1976 with a running time of 112 minutes.

== Cast ==
Denver Pyle as Galen Clark
Ken Berry as Zachary Moore
John Dehner as John Muir
Cheryl Miller as Kathleen Clark
Ford Rainey as Abraham Lincoln
Norman Fell as Doctor
Cliff Osmond as McCollough
Jack Kruschen as Madden
Don Shanks as Teneiya
Melissa Jones as Heather
Brett Palmer as Joey
Prestiss Rowe as Forbes
Hyde Clayton as Chairman of Legislature
Coleman Creel as Senator John Conness
Michael G. Kavanagh as General Carson
Tom Carlin as Harold Lawson
Earl Benton as President's secretary
Michael Ruud as Officer
Lynn Lehman as State Representative

== See also ==
Galen Clark
John Muir
John Conness
Mariposa Grove
Giant sequoias
Yosemite National Park
National Park Service

== Bibliography ==
- Clark, Galen (1904). Indians of the Yosemite valley and vicinity, their history, customs and traditions. Yosemite Valley, Calif: G. Clark. OCLC 65664888.
- Clark, Galen (1907). The big trees of California, their history and characteristics. Yosemite Valley, Cal: G. Clark [Redondo, Cal: Press of Reflex Pub. Co.] OCLC 344915.
- Clark, Galen (April 1909). "Yosemite: Past and Present". Sunset.
- Clark, Galen (1910). The Yosemite Valley, its history, characteristic features, and theories regarding its origin. Yosemite Valley, Cal: N. L. Salter. OCLC 4721921.
- Clark, Galen (1964). Early days in Yosemite Valley. Los Angeles. OCLC 4175271. Originally published as "A Plea for Yosemite" in Yosemite Nature Notes (February 1927), from a manuscript written c. 1907.
