= Grizzly Giant =

Giant sequoia tree in Yosemite National Park

Coordinates: 37°30′12.65″N 119°36′2.39″W

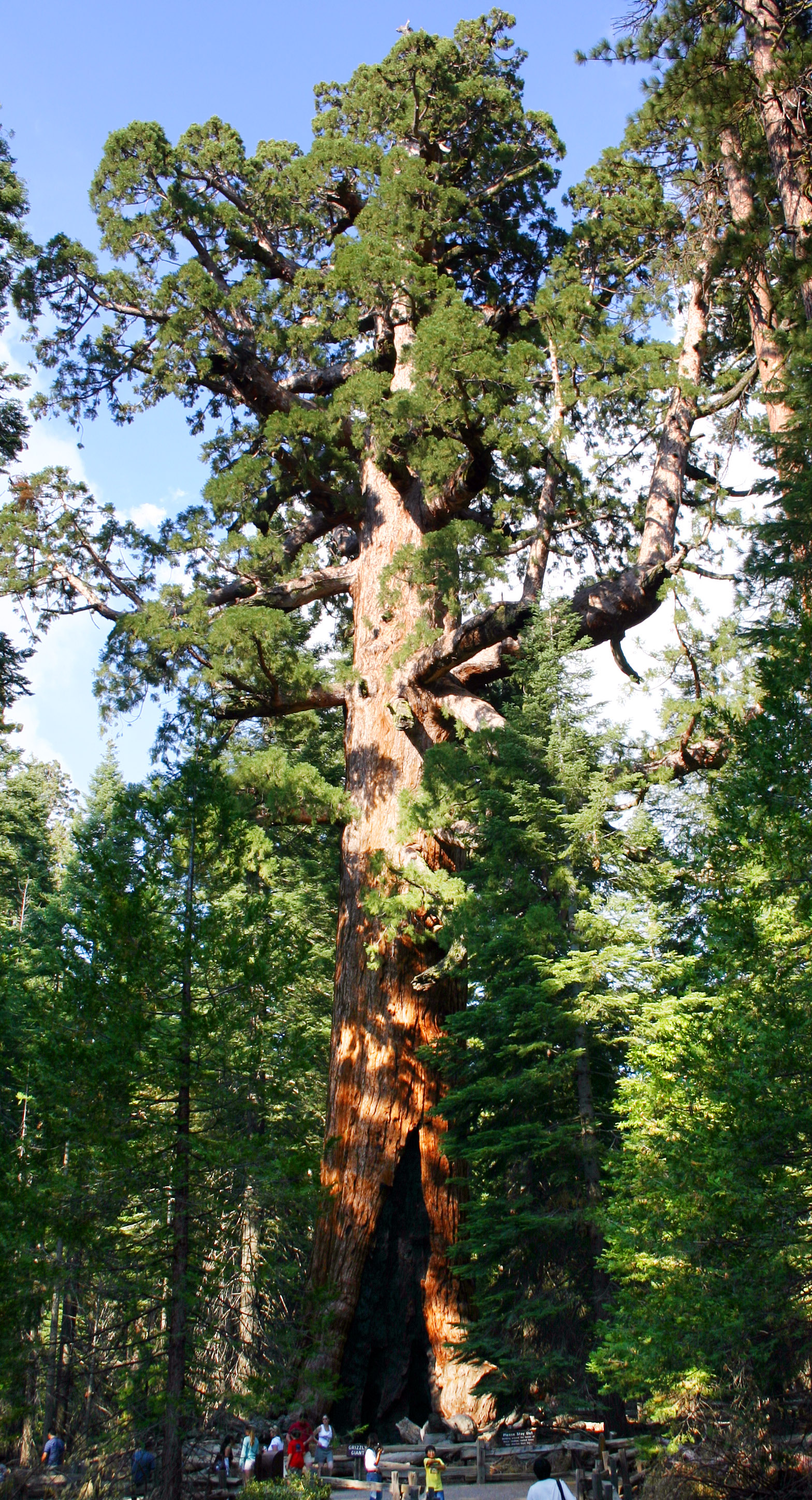
The Grizzly Giant, a giant sequoia, is among the most popular attractions in Yosemite National Park's Mariposa Grove. (For scale, people are visible at the bottom of the photo.)

The Grizzly Giant is a massive giant sequoia located in Mariposa Grove within Yosemite National Park. Famous for its impressive size and age, the Grizzly Giant has been a symbol of the park since tourism began. The Grizzly Giant stands out with its enormous trunk, which is much larger than typical giant sequoias, and its unique, uneven branches shaped by centuries of weather and environmental factors. Its name comes from its imposing presence, reminiscent of a California grizzly bear.

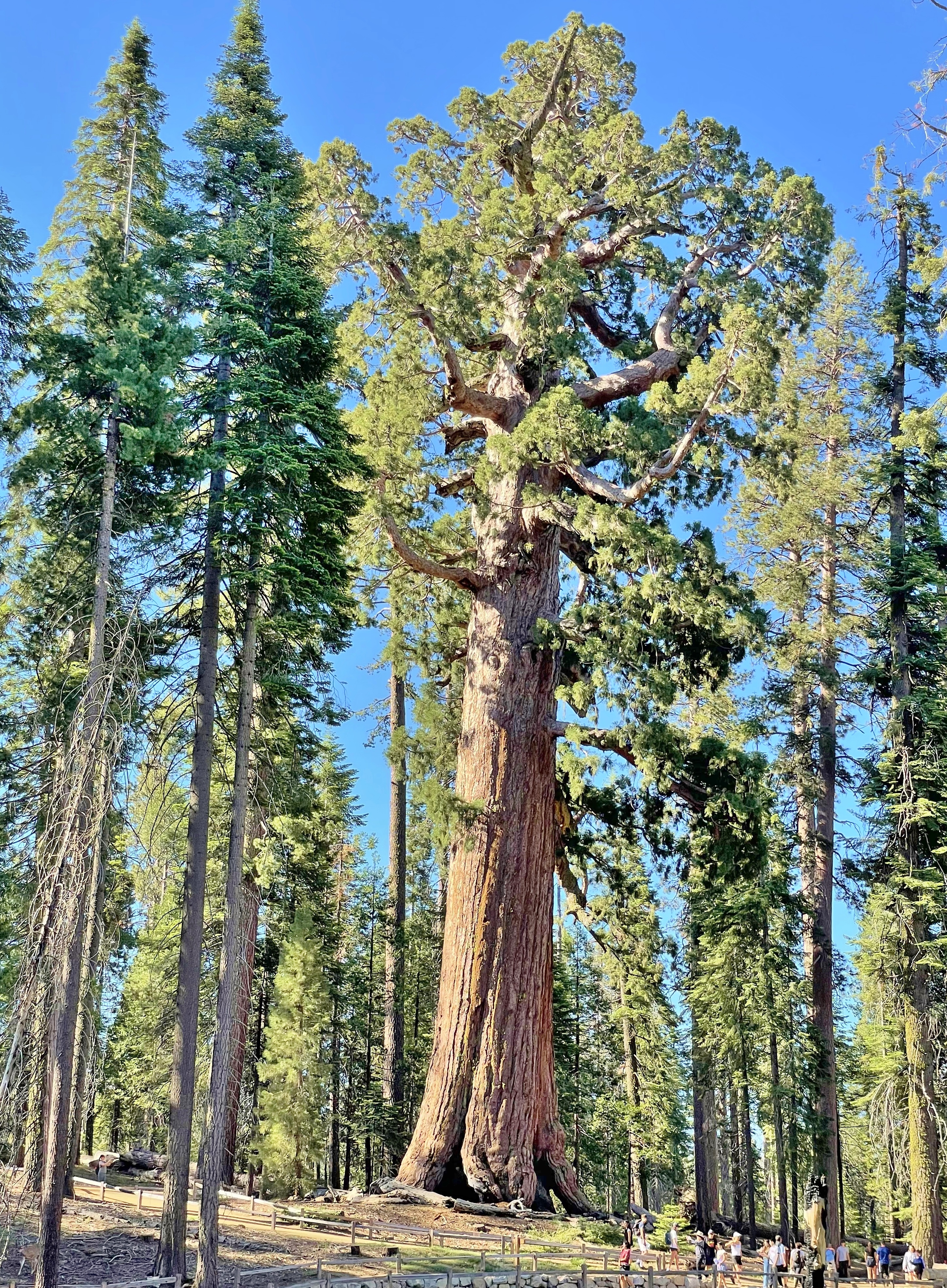
Another angle of Grizzly Giant, also with people visible for scale. (July 4, 2023)

The Grizzly Giant is the oldest tree in Mariposa Grove, which is Yosemite National Park's largest grove of giant sequoias, containing hundreds of mature trees. Although once considered the oldest and largest tree in the world, recent dating techniques have estimated the Grizzly Giant’s age at about 2,995 years, with a margin of error of plus or minus 250 years. In 1990, the tree's volume was measured at 34,005 cubic feet (962.9 m^{3}), making it the 26th-largest living giant sequoia.

Nineteenth-century photographs and paintings of the Grizzly Giant vividly showcased the immense scale and beauty of giant sequoias, convincing a skeptical public of their existence and spurring early conservation efforts that ultimately protected Mariposa Grove.

== History ==
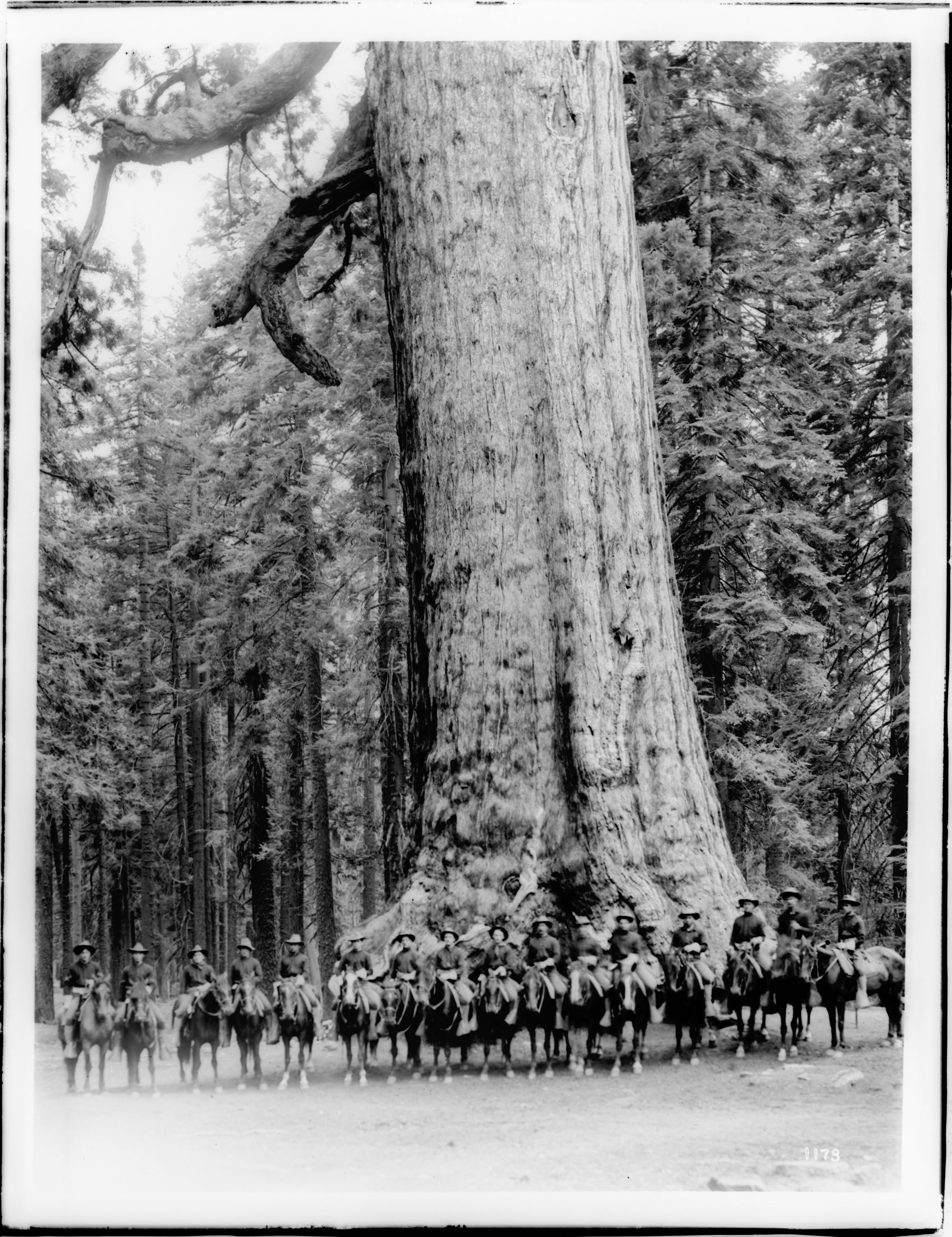
Sixteen mounted soldiers in front of the Grizzly Giant. From 1891 to 1913, the U.S. Army protected Yosemite National Park.

In 1859, publisher James M. Hutchings, on the advice of naturalist Galen Clark, named the tree the Grizzled Giant. By 1888, it was commonly known as the Grizzly Giant. Hutchings said the tree "looks at you as defiantly as the oldest veteran grizzly bear ever could."

The Grizzly Giant was once believed to be much older, with zoologist David Starr Jordan estimating its age at 8,000 to 10,000 years.

The tree has endured severe fire damage over the centuries, losing over 80% of its bark and sapwood, along with significant heartwood. This damage has limited its nutrient intake, slowing its growth and healing. In addition to fire, the tree has faced countless storms, including one in 1942 during which it was struck by lightning six times.

The tree has hosted visits from notable figures, including Presidents Roosevelt in 1903 and Taft in 1909.

=== Protective measures ===
Since 1904, the Grizzly Giant has been closely monitored due to its significant 18-foot lean. Despite weighing an estimated 3,700 tons, the tree remains balanced through its naturally curved structure, strategically placed branches, and a robust root system. In 1912, a wire fence was installed around the tree's base to stop visitors from damaging it by hacking off pieces of bark for souvenirs.

On July 16, 2022, the Washburn Fire threatened Grizzly Giant and other trees in the Mariposa Grove. The National Park Service used sprinklers to protect the famous tree.

== Dimensions ==
Height above base	63.7 m	209.0 ft
Circumference at ground	29.5 m	96.5 ft
Diameter 1.5 m above base	7.8 m	25.5 ft
Estimated bole volume	963 m³	34,000 ft³

== Visual Arts ==
Photography and paintings of the Grizzly Giant significantly shaped 19th-century views of giant sequoias and played a key role in the conservation efforts that protected Mariposa Grove.

=== Photography ===
Carelton Watkins' photographs of the Grizzly Giant in the 1860s captured more than its size; they bridged a continental divide. A key image, showing the tree towering over people at its base, made the enormity of giant sequoias clear to Eastern audiences cut off by the American Civil War. These photographs dispelled doubts about the so-called 'California Hoax,' convincing academics and the public of the giant sequoias' existence and sparking both fascination and scientific study. Botanist Asa Gray was particularly struck by these photos. He acquired Watkins' full collection, using them in an 1872 American Association for the Advancement of Science lecture. His presentation highlighted the sequoia’s ecological importance, driving further research and ultimately, conservation efforts that would lead to state protection of Mariposa Grove.

=== Painting ===
In the 1870s, Albert Bierstadt, a key figure of the Hudson River School, painted the Grizzly Giant's grandeur in The Great Trees, Mariposa Grove, California. Inspired during his 1871-1873 visits to Yosemite and Mariposa Grove, Bierstadt completed the expansive five-by-ten-foot canvas in 1876. The painting, inspired by Watkins' renowned photograph and displayed at the Centennial Exposition in Philadelphia, broadened public exposure to the West's natural beauty, reinforced support for the conservation movement, and echoed themes of manifest destiny.

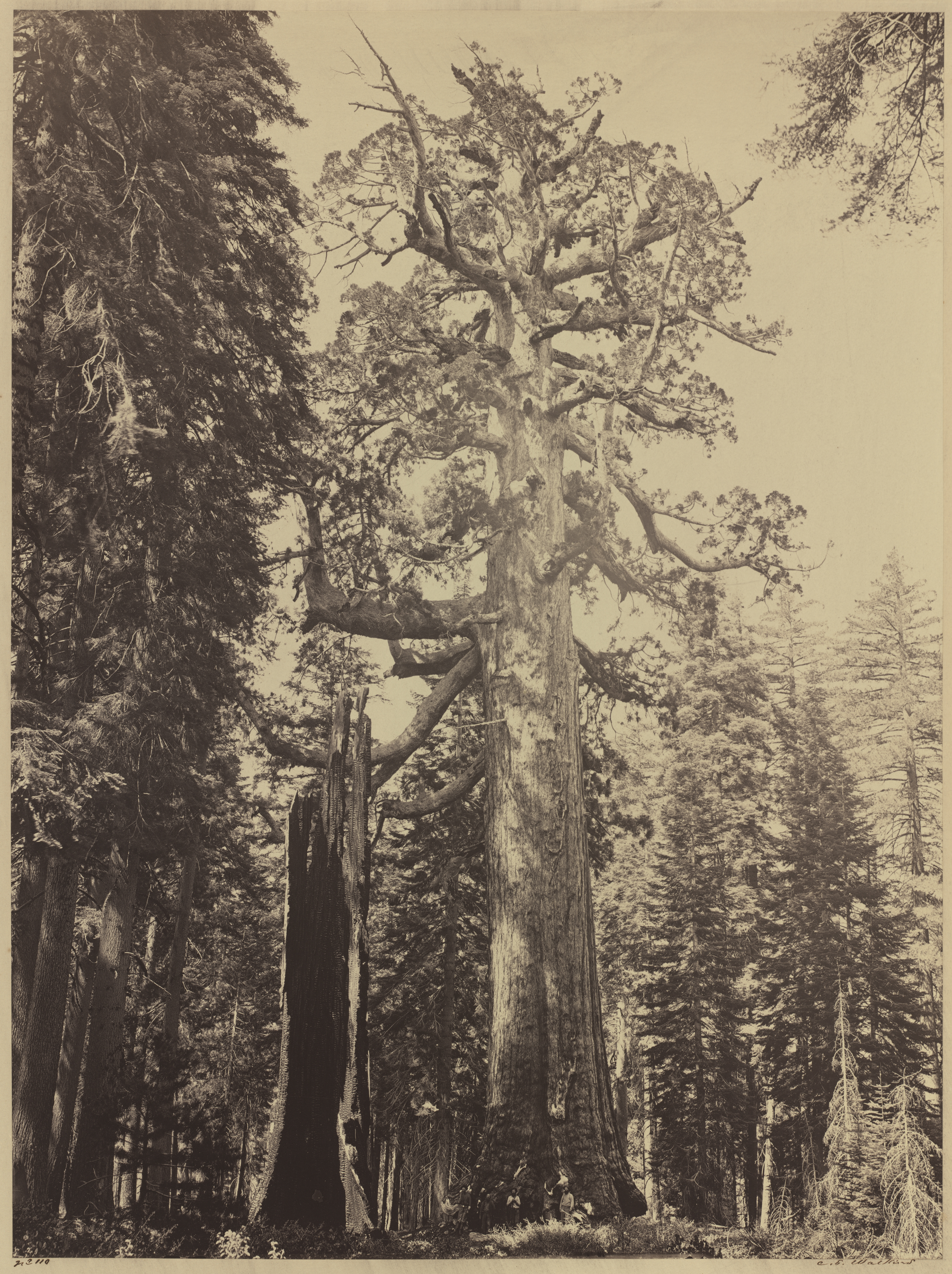
Grizzly Giant, Mariposa Grove, albumen print by Carleton Watkins, 1866.

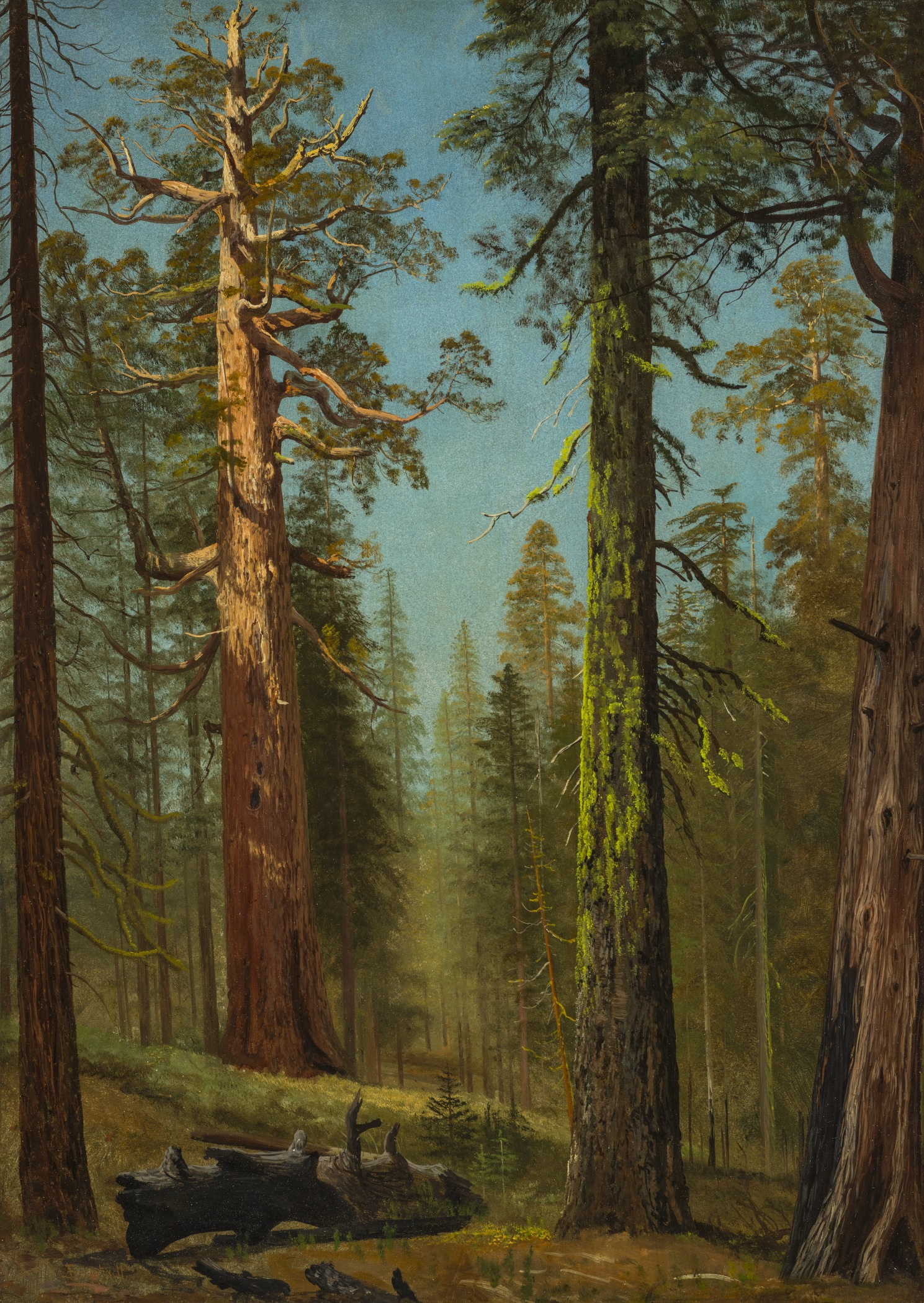
The Great Trees, Mariposa Grove, California oil painting by Albert Bierstadt, 1876.

== See also ==
- List of largest giant sequoias
- List of individual trees

== Bibliography ==
- Geology of U.S. Parklands, Fifth Edition, Kiver, Eugene P. and Harris, David V. (John Wiley & Sons; New York; 1999; pp. 227) ISBN 0-471-33218-6
