= Mariposa Grove Restoration Project =

Rewilding project in Yosemite National Park

The Mariposa Grove Restoration Project has been the largest restoration effort in Yosemite’s history, using a variety of restoration measures to enhance both ecosystem processes and visitor experience in the Mariposa Grove. Over a century of visitor use has resulted in infrastructure, trails, parking lots, and roads that has fragmented habitat and jeopardized essential ecosystem processes. In 2011 the National Park Service (NPS), with financial support from the Yosemite Conservancy, began the planning process to initiate restoration actions in the grove. At the end of 2013, the Final Environmental Impact Statement was released, with restoration activities beginning in July 2015.

As for ecological goals of the project, the primary goal was to restore giant sequoia habitat and their associated wetlands. Since giant sequoias are long-lived trees, the grove required a solution that would allow them to sustain themselves for years. As such, the long-term goal of the project was to ensure that the ecosystem could function dynamically over the long term or the next 50-100 years. This was done by addressing air and water quality and natural soundscape issues and restoring natural hydrological functions. Moreover, the project intended to protect special status wildlife, plant species, and sensitive wetland habitats. Other restoration goals included the planting of native vegetation and the promotion of giant sequoia recruitment, while also addressing human impacts on tree roots and reintroducing fire into the landscape.

The overall social goal of the project was to improve visitor experience at the grove, such as enhancing the soundscapes and accessibility. In addition, there were several problems identified in EIS, such as insufficient way finding, deteriorating infrastructure, limited parking, crowding the South Entrance, and large amount of noise intruding on the natural soundscape, and Wawona Point being in a state of disrepair. To address these issues, the project outlined goals that included protecting and preserving natural and cultural resources, maintaining and improving park infrastructure, enhancing visitor access and experience, and improving accessibility and safety.

Several ecological restoration actions took place to reestablish wetland hydrology and fire dynamics, the primary ecological goals of the project. To achieve these objectives, restoration actions included the removal of many sections of roads and trails (e.g., social trails) that have created ditches and compacted soils, which have subsequently changed the way water flows around giant sequoias. After this treatment, soils were decompacted and recontoured to the natural topography of the location, thereby encouraging sheet flow and sediment deposition—an example of active restoration. Roads and trails that could not be removed were relocated or realigned away from sensitive wetland habitat or giant sequoias.

Restored areas were then sparsely replanted with native vegetation and plants that were salvaged prior to construction or planted with locally sourced seeds to recreate a multi-layered vegetation forest structure. In an effort to protect and encourage the recovery of restored areas and other disturbed areas from erosion, mulch and rocks were applied as well as the removal of non-native and invasive species in adjacent areas. Moreover, larger and better-placed culverts as well as additional ones were installed to replace aging and inadequate culverts to facilitate sheet flow. As for reestablishing fire processes, prescribed fires both inside and outside the grove were conducted to facilitate giant sequoias' germination and to reduce the risk of high-severity fires, as well as establish canopy gaps. To mitigate restoration actions on endangered species such as the pallid bat, spotted bat, Pacific fisher, and the California spotted owl, an on-staff wildlife biologist conducted surveys to determine if there are any individuals within the project area or the presence of nesting sites.

With the parking lot at the grove removed, a brand new welcome plaza, gift shop, and parking lot near the South Entrance were constructed, with a shuttle service between the Welcome Plaza and the Mariposa Grove Arrival Area, thus creating a quieter experience when arriving at the grove itself. To improve accessibility while also protecting sequoias and other sensitive wetland areas, new accessible boardwalks were added in the lower part of the grove. Trails beyond the boardwalks were naturally surfaced using 'TrueLock,' making the trails more permeable for holding in soil moisture. The restoration project also enhanced visitor experience at the grove by placing fencing and signs around the grove to discourage people from trampling on sensitive wetland habitat and tree roots—an example of passive restoration. Educational signage and exhibits were also placed throughout the lower grove and welcome plaza, discussing sequoia ecology and human history. To aid in orientation and wayfinding, trails were given names, thereby telling visitors where they are going and the length of the hike. Additionally, more benches were added for visitors to take a break, allowing them to explore more areas of the grove.
