= Mariposa Grove =

Giant sequoia grove in Yosemite National Park, California, United States

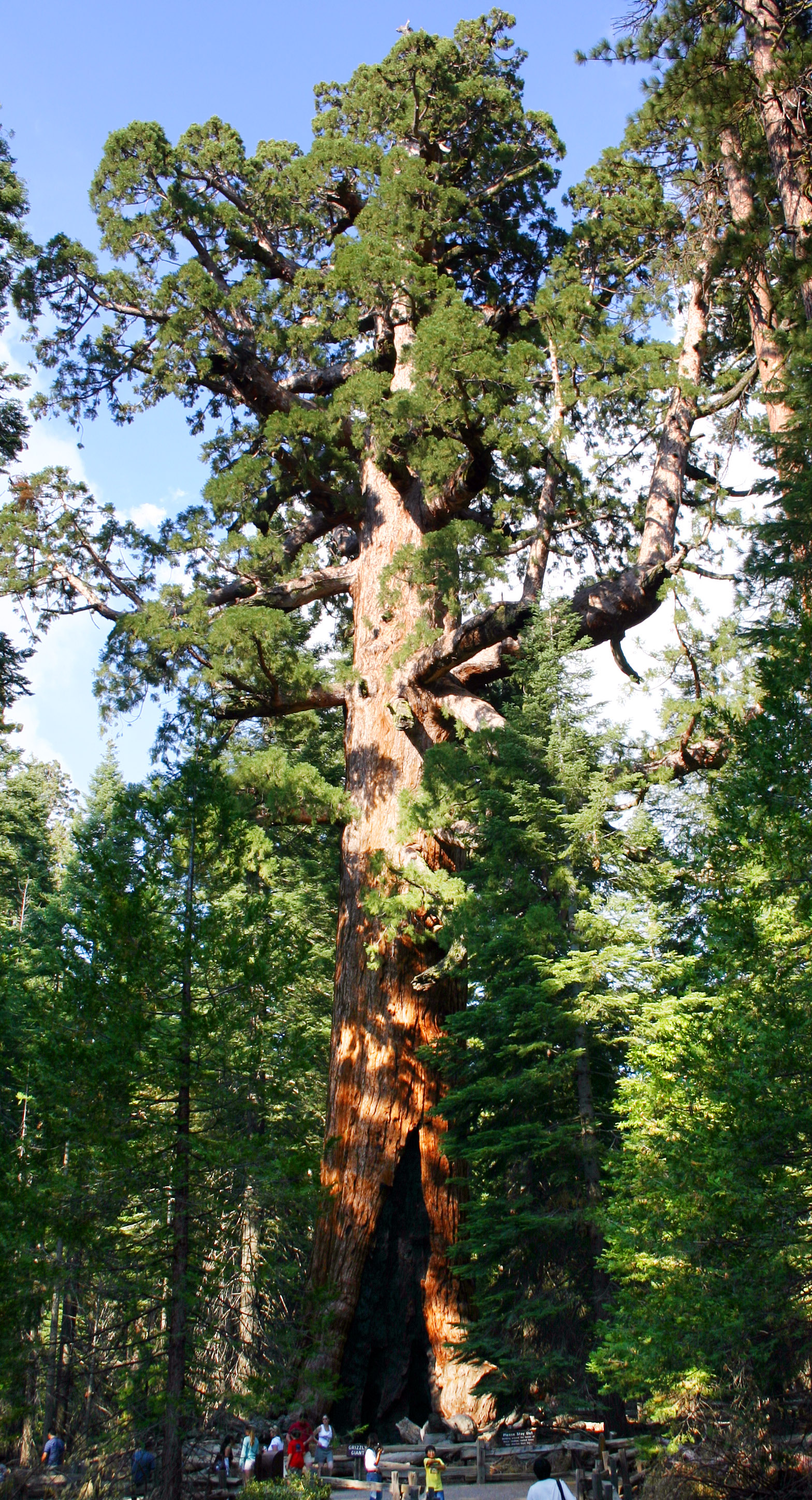
- Grizzly Giant tree of Mariposa Grove

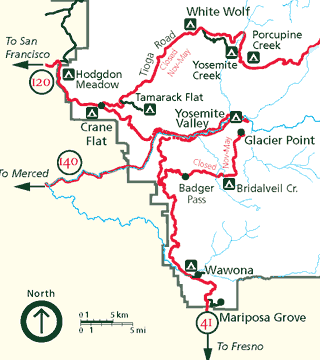
- Mariposa Grove is located at the southern entrance to Yosemite National Park

Geography
- Location: Yosemite National Park, California, United States
- Coordinates: 37°30′50″N 119°35′54″W
- Elevation: 5,740–6,730 ft (1,750–2,050 m)

Ecology
- Dominant tree species: Sequoiadendron giganteum

Mariposa Grove is a sequoia grove located near Wawona, California, United States, in the southernmost part of Yosemite National Park. It is the largest grove of giant sequoias in the park, with several hundred mature specimens. Two of its trees are among the 30 largest giant sequoias in the world. The grove attracts about one million visitors annually. Part of the natural area is old-growth forest and recognized by Old-Growth Forest Network.

The Mariposa Grove was first visited by non-native people in 1857 when Galen Clark and Milton Mann found it. They named the grove after Mariposa County, California, where the grove is located. Abraham Lincoln signed an Act of Congress on June 30, 1864, ceding Mariposa Grove and Yosemite Valley to the state of California. Criticism of stewardship over the land led to the state's returning the grove to federal control with the establishment of Yosemite National Park.

The grove closed on July 6, 2015, for a restoration project and reopened on June 15, 2018. The Mariposa Grove Museum is listed on the National Register of Historic Places.

== Human development ==
Mariposa Grove's evolution from a remote natural area to a well-integrated conservation model highlights the ongoing efforts to balance public access with ecological preservation.

=== Discovery ===
In 1856, after hearing from a hunter about three massive trees similar to those recently discovered at Calaveras Grove, Galen Clark, a resident of Wawona in Yosemite, embarked on a year-long search. In 1857, he discovered not only the three trees but a total of 427 mature giant sequoias in what he would later name Mariposa Grove. Clark built the first permanent structure in the grove, a cabin from which he guided tourists. The site now houses the Mariposa Grove Museum.

=== Tunnel trees ===
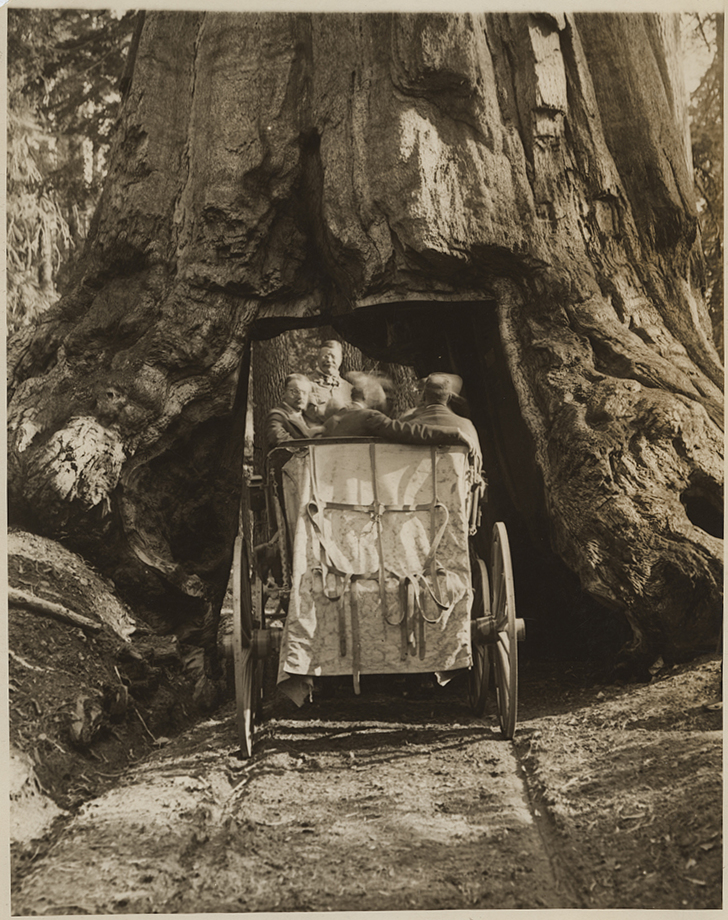
Theodore Roosevelt riding through the Wawona Tunnel Tree, with Secretary William Loeb Jr., circa May 15, 1903.

In 1881, the Yosemite Stage and Turnpike Company carved a tunnel through the Wawona Tree in Mariposa Grove, large enough to accommodate stagecoaches. The tunnel, measuring 7 ft (2.1 m) wide, 9 ft (2.7 m) high, and 26 ft (7.9 m) long, transformed the tree into a significant tourist attraction and a symbol of the grove's colossal sequoias. Such tunnel trees became hallmark attractions of Mariposa Grove. A second tunnel tree, the California Tunnel Tree, was cut in 1895. It remains the only living tunnel tree in Mariposa Grove.

=== Automobile era ===
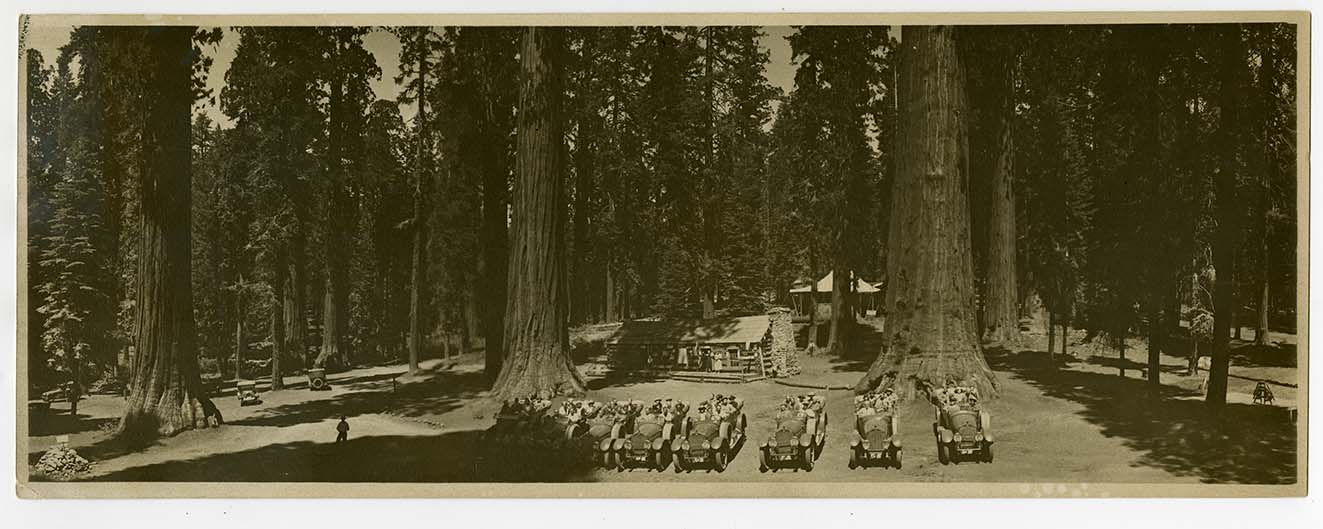
Autos in front of the Galen Clark Cabin.

The introduction of automobiles significantly changed tourism at Yosemite National Park. The lift of the car ban in 1913 and the construction of Highway 41 in 1933 made the park more accessible. This increased accessibility coincided with a rise in visitor numbers.

==== Camp in the Big Trees ====
In response to the growing number of motorists visiting the park, the Yosemite National Park Company established Camp in the Big Trees in 1919. The camp provided direct access to the giant trees, eliminating the need for the previously required 18-mile round trip from the Wawona Hotel. The camp featured cabins where visitors could stay overnight, right among the giant sequoias.

==== Big Trees Lodge ====
Built in 1932 to replace cabins that had collapsed under heavy snowfall, the Big Trees Lodge featured 12 guest rooms—four with private baths—along with a lounge, office, gift shop, dining room, kitchen, and a photo darkroom.. Originally intended for year-round use, the lodge operated from June to September due to heavy snowfall. It closed as a guest lodge in 1972, later served as a dormitory, and was eventually removed due to environmental concerns.

==== Tram service ====
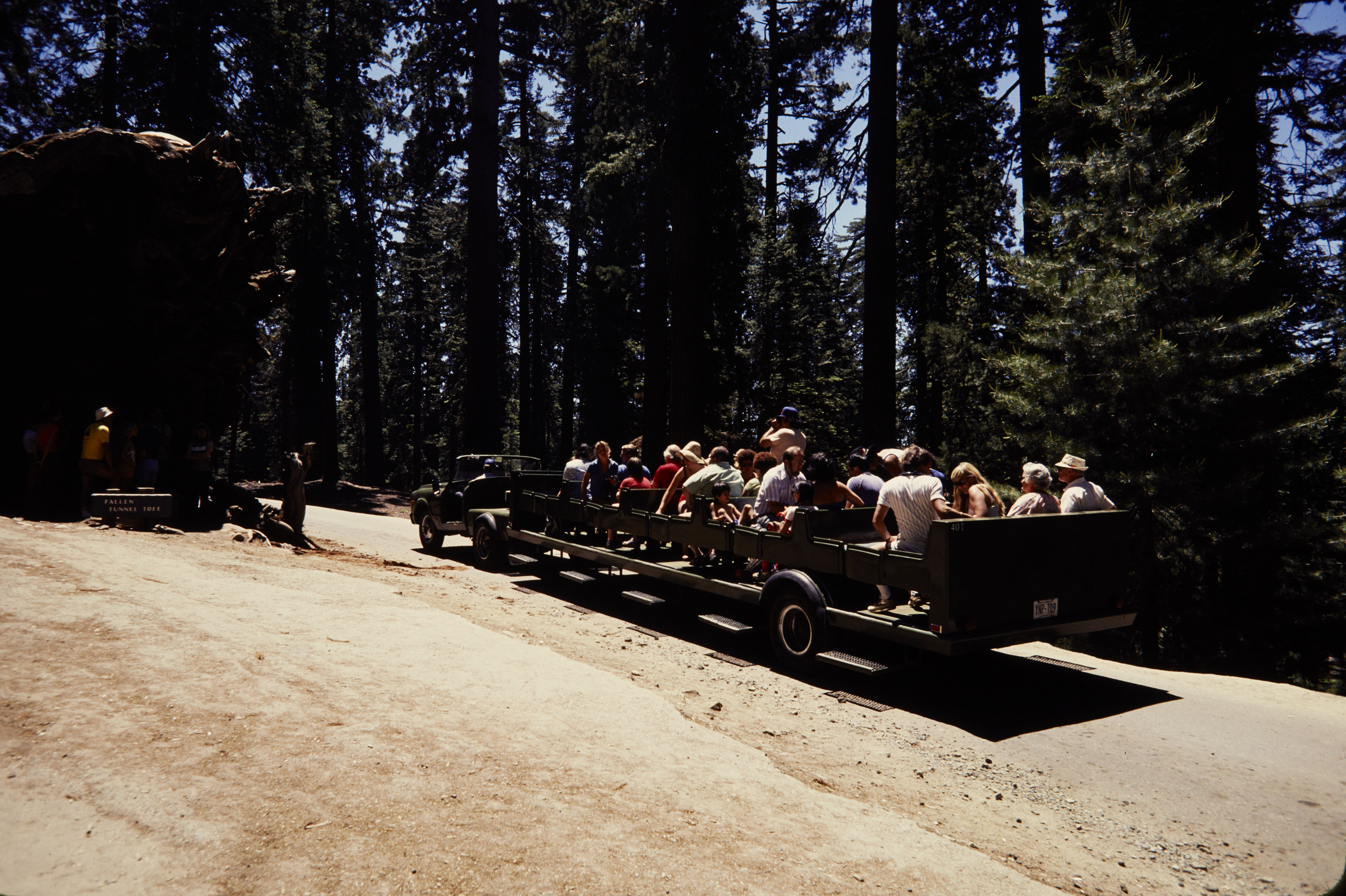
Tram riders observe the fallen Wawona Tree.

In 1969, Yosemite officials introduced trams to reduce traffic congestion around the giant sequoias, banning private vehicles in the upper grove. Each tram carried 50 passengers, offering a more sustainable way to access the trees and protect the environment. The tour, which provided visitors with headphone-guided experiences among the giant sequoias, ran until 2014 when it was discontinued as part of the restoration effort that removed the asphalt roads from the grove.

=== Restoration project ===
On June 30, 2014, to mark the 150th anniversary of the Yosemite Grant Act, Mariposa Grove closed for a four-year restoration project, the largest in the park's history. The project focused on protecting tree root systems and restoring natural water flows which had been impeded by paved roads throughout the grove. Key improvements included restoring sequoia and wetland habitats, realigning roads and trails, building a new welcome plaza, adding shuttle services, and removing commercial operations like gift shops and tram tours. When the grove reopened on June 15, 2018, a major change was the removal of private car access. Visitors now begin their journey at a welcome plaza near the park’s south entrance, taking a free shuttle on a two-mile ride to the restored grove.

== Human impact ==
=== Fire management ===
Giant sequoias rely on fire for reproduction but can be destroyed by intense wildfires when suppression allows ladder fuels to accumulate. This reduces soil moisture and increases heat generated by wildfires, which can overwhelm the trees' natural resistance. In recent times, controlled burns have been key to Mariposa Grove's ecological health, restoring the natural fire cycle disrupted by fire suppression after Anglo-American settlement. Natural fires historically occurred every one to fifteen years, and controlled burns were reintroduced in 1968 to preserve the grove.

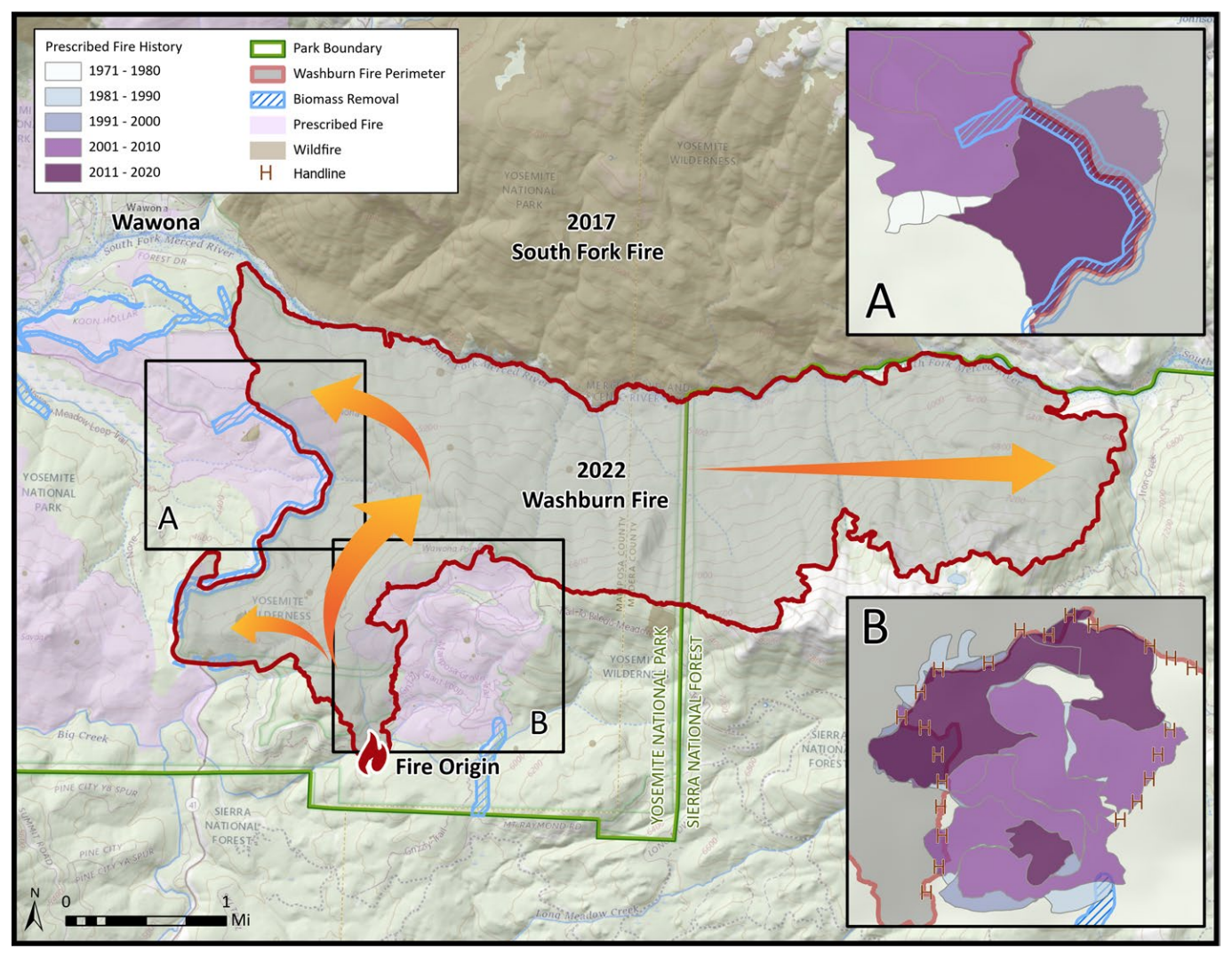
Fuels reduction in Mariposa Grove (lower right inset) saved giant sequoias from the 2022 Washburn Fire

Controlled burns have been crucial. During the 2022 Washburn Fire, they helped firefighters protect ancient sequoias, demonstrating their effectiveness in forest conservation.

=== Climate change ===
Climate change is placing immense pressure on Mariposa Grove, threatening the survival of its iconic trees. From the 1930s to 1990s, large-diameter trees declined by 24% in Yosemite National Park due to water stress. This issue worsened after the 2012–2017 drought, with several sequoias dying from drought and beetle infestations. Experts predict more losses as severe droughts increase.

In 2022, an alarming sign of distress emerged in Mariposa Grove when sequoias released a massive, unprecedented crop of seeds—an event typically triggered by fire. This release was ultimately futile, as sequoia seeds can only take root in soil that has been fully exposed by fire.

Signs of climate stress in Mariposa Grove are overshadowed by the rising number of climate-induced sequoia deaths in National Park Service-managed groves further south in the Sierra Nevada.

== Noteworthy trees ==
Many trees in Mariposa Grove are named after 19th-century American figures, like conservationist Galen Clark, or for their unique characteristics, such as the Telescope and Clothespin Trees. Though the grove has never been logged, several named trees, including the Wawona Tunnel Tree and the Massachusetts Tree, have fallen due to human activity. Visitors can explore the trees via a network of trails, offering routes that range from easy to strenuous, with some accessible options.

Name	Description	Volume (cubic feet)	Height (feet)	Image
American Legion Tree	A plaque marks this sequoia, dedicated by the American Legion in 1921 to the unknown dead of World War I. Having endured severe fire and storm damage, the tree stands as a testament to resilience in the face of adversity.		250	The American Legion Tree stands 250 feet tall with a diameter of 18.3 feet, measured 10 feet above its base. A plaque marks this sequoia, dedicated in 1921 to the unknown dead of World War I.
Bachelor and Three Graces	A group of four giant sequoias, three growing very close together, with a fourth a little more distant. Their roots are intertwined, meaning if one falls, it likely brings the others with it.		254	Group of sequoia trees known as the "Bachelor and Three Graces" located in Mariposa Grove, Yosemite National Park - June 2022
California Tunnel Tree	Carved in 1895, the California Tunnel Tree is the sole surviving giant sequoia with a tunnel, following the collapses of the Wawona Tree in 1969 and the Pioneer Cabin Tree in 2017. Initially, the Yosemite Stage and Turnpike Company created the tunnel as an alternate route for tourists when snow obstructed access to the Wawona Tree. It functioned as a drive-thru attraction until 1932, when the National Park Service redirected the Mariposa Grove Road and converted the path through the tree into a footpath.		232	Sequoia known as the "Tunnel Tree" located in Mariposa Grove, Yosemite National Park - June 2022
Clothespin Tree	Fire damage has shaped this tree's trunk like a clothespin. A 50 yards (46 m) walk to its base reveals a 70 feet (21 m) high, 16 feet (4.9 m) wide opening. Despite its lean, the tree may still stand for generations.		266	Clothespin Tree
Columbia Tree	The tallest tree in the grove and in Yosemite National Park at 286 feet (87 m).		286	
Faithful Couple	A rare case where two trees grew so close together that their trunks have fused together at the base.			Sequoia known as the "Faithful Couple Tree" located in Mariposa Grove, Yosemite National Park - June 2022
Fallen Giant	One of the largest trees in the grove, until it fell in 1873.			
Fallen Monarch	The exact date when the Fallen Monarch tree fell remains unknown. Though its bark and sapwood have decayed over centuries, its heartwood endures as a lasting monument. In the past, visitors would drive stagecoaches onto the massive trunk for photos.			Fallen Monarch and F Troop of US Cavalry
Galen Clark Tree	Noted for its historical significance as the first giant sequoia encountered by Galen Clark upon entering the grove in 1857. In 2022, a sprinkler system was installed to protect the tree during the Washburn Fire.		240	First giant sequoia discovered by Galen Clark in 1857, marking the beginning of his exploration of the Mariposa Grove.
General Grant Tree	A large giant sequoia located west of the Mariposa Grove Cabin. Not to be confused with the General Grant Tree of Kings Canyon National Park.		267	
General Sheridan Tree	The General Sheridan tree, also known as the William H. Seward Tree, is named in honor of United States Army Civil War General Philip H. Sheridan. This tree is located just south of the Mariposa Grove Cabin.		259	
Grizzly Giant	The oldest tree and second largest tree in the grove. The giant sequoia named Grizzly Giant is between probably 1900–2400 years old: the oldest tree in the grove. It has a volume of 34,010 cubic feet (963 m^{3}), and is counted as the 25th largest tree in the world. It is 210 feet (64 m) tall, and has a heavily buttressed base with a basal circumference of 28 m (92 ft) or a diameter of 30 feet (9.1 m); above the buttresses at 2.4 m above ground, the circumference is only 23 m. Grizzly Giant's first branch from the base is 2 m (6 ft) in diameter.	34,010 cu ft (963 m^{3})	209	Sequoia tree known as "Grizzly Giant" located in Mariposa Grove, Yosemite National Park - June 2022
Massachusetts Tree	Two-thirds of the tree’s base was burned in 1710, with fire funneling 51 feet (16 m) through the heartwood. In the 1870s, a road was built over its weakened roots. By spring 1927, snow, fire, erosion, and man’s impact brought it down.		280	
Stable Tree	The Stable Tree, an 1,800-year-old sequoia was named for its large hollow trunk that could shelter four horses during the stagecoach era. It fell on August 28, 1934, at 7:30 a.m. The tree collapsed due to weakened roots, a result of a centuries-old fire scar compounded by a recent windstorm. The fall happened in calm conditions and created a large crater, detected by a slight tremor and subsequent dust clouds at the nearby Big Trees Lodge.		269	
Telescope Tree	Repeated fires destroyed much of the crown and two-thirds of the heartwood, and from inside, looking up feels like peering through a telescope, with branches and sky visible. Despite losing 39 feet (12 m) feet of its 74 feet (23 m) foot circumference, enough bark and sapwood remain for the tree to survive. Ax marks from 1870s road builders show where they started to cut a tunnel, but a foreman wisely halted the effort, knowing the tree would collapse in the next storm if weakened further.		188	"Telescope" sequoia tree, Yosemite National Park, CA (July 2023)
Washington Tree	The largest tree in the grove.	35,950 cu ft (1,018 m^{3})		
Wawona Tunnel Tree	Renamed the 'Fallen Tunnel Tree,' this sequoia was the first to have a tunnel carved through its trunk in 1881. Originally wide enough for horse-drawn carriages and early automobiles, the tunnel weakened the tree's base. It collapsed during a 1969 snowstorm, catalyzing a turning point in national parks' preservation efforts.		234	Fallen Tunnel Tree

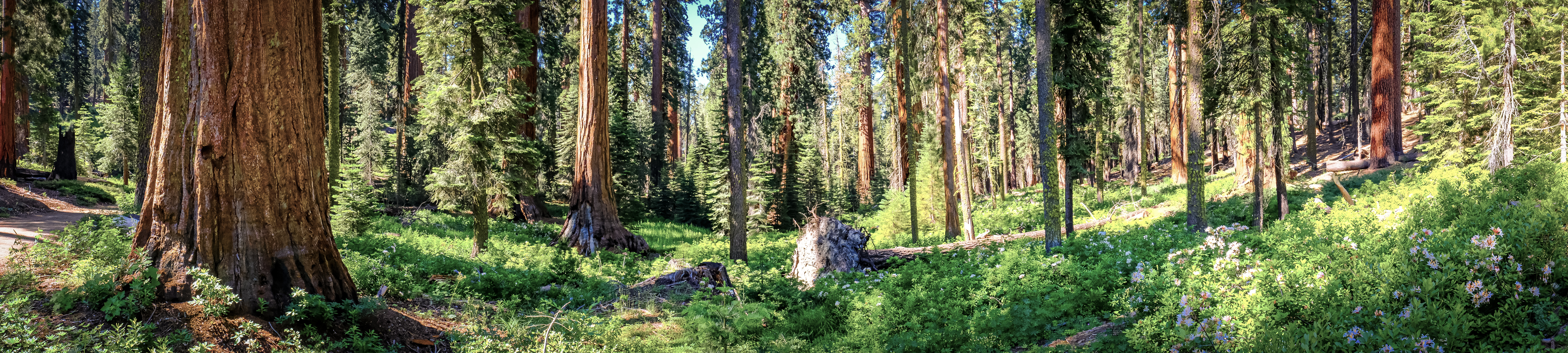
Panoramic view of upper Mariposa Grove

== Structures ==
=== Mariposa Grove Museum ===
The Mariposa Grove Museum is a historic log cabin that opened to the public in 1931. Positioned near the General Grant and General Sheridan trees, the cabin was constructed to replace an earlier structure known as the Galen Clark Cabin which had stood on the same site since the late 19th century. The original cabin, built by Galen Clark in 1858, served as a shelter for visitors and became renowned for its picturesque setting. Due to deterioration, the original cabin was replaced by the current structure, which was designed to echo the rustic style of its predecessor while incorporating modern building techniques for longevity.

The museum housed within the cabin features historic photographs and exhibits detailing the history of the Mariposa Grove and its significance. The Mariposa Grove Cabin was listed on the National Register of Historic Places in 1978.

== See also ==
- List of giant sequoia groves
- List of largest giant sequoias
- List of individual trees
- Nelder Grove - a nearby giant sequoia grove.
- Galen Clark - discoverer of the Mariposa Grove
- Guardian of the Wilderness - theatrical film about Galen Clark
