= Denver Pyle =

American actor (1920–1997)

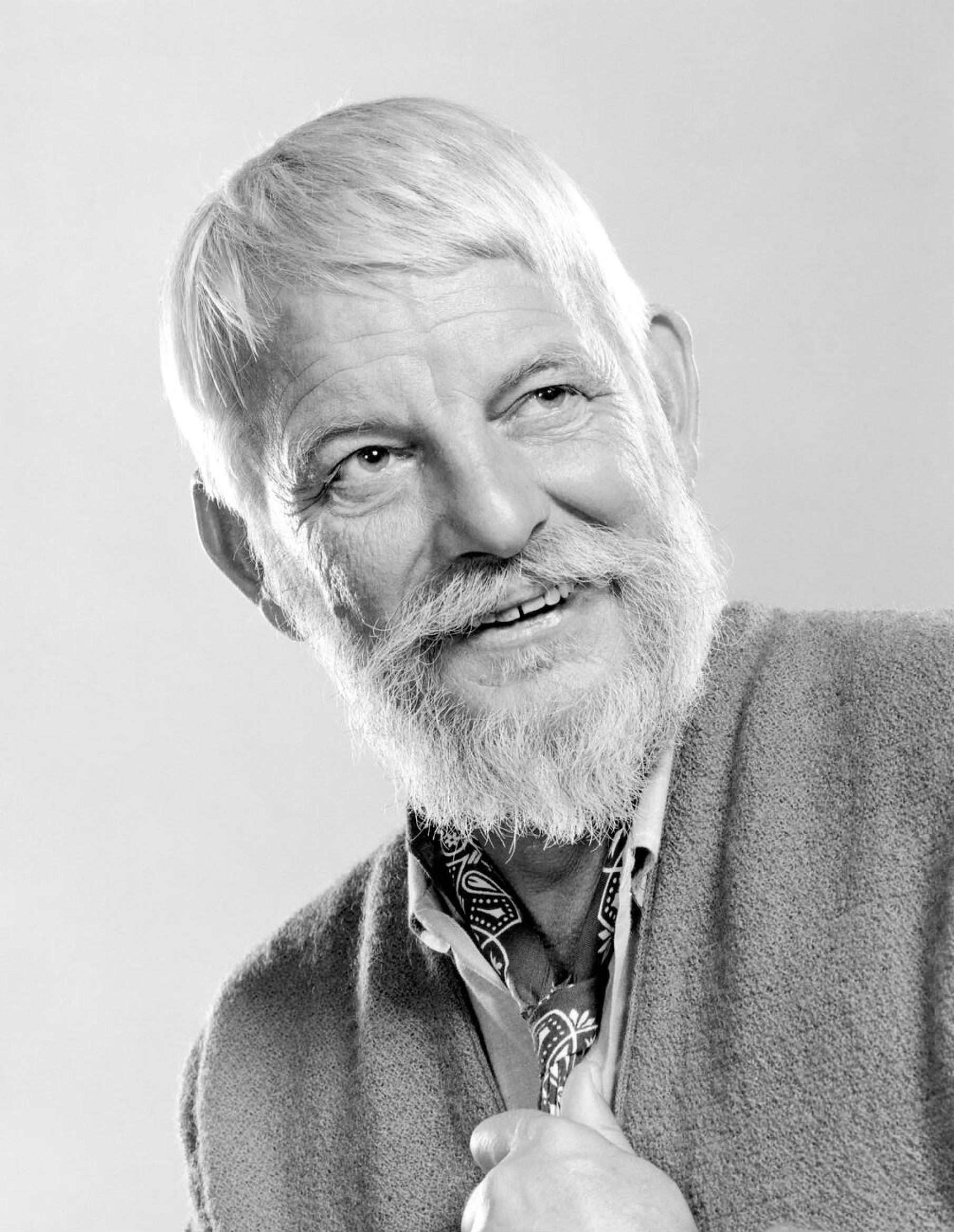
- Pyle in 1968
- Born: Denver Dell Pyle; May 11, 1920; Bethune, Colorado, U.S.
- Died: December 25, 1997 (aged 77); Burbank, California, U.S.
- Resting place: Forreston Cemetery, Forreston, Texas
- Occupations: Actor; director
- Years active: 1947–1997
- Known for: Uncle Jesse in The Dukes of Hazzard
- Spouses: Marilee Carpenter (m. 1955; div. 1970) Tippie Johnston (m. 1983)
- Children: 2

Denver Dell Pyle (May 11, 1920 – December 25, 1997) was an American film and television actor and director. He was well known for a number of television roles from the 1960s through the 1980s, including his portrayal of Briscoe Darling in several episodes of The Andy Griffith Show, as Jesse Duke in The Dukes of Hazzard from 1979 to 1985, as Mad Jack in the NBC television series The Life and Times of Grizzly Adams, and as the main character's father, Buck Webb, in CBS's The Doris Day Show. In many of his roles, he portrayed either authority figures, or gruff, demanding father figures, often as comic relief. Perhaps his most memorable film role was that of Texas Ranger Frank Hamer in the movie Bonnie and Clyde (1967), as the lawman who relentlessly chased down and finally killed the notorious duo in an ambush.

== Early life, family and education ==
Pyle was born in Bethune, Colorado on May 11, 1920, to farmer Ben H. Pyle and his wife Maude. His brother, Willis, became an animator known for his work with Walt Disney Animation Studios and UPA.

After graduating from high school, Pyle briefly attended Colorado State University, but dropped out to pursue a career as a drummer. Later, he worked the oil fields in Oklahoma and Texas. In 1940, Pyle moved to Los Angeles, where his brother and sister were working. His sister helped him land a job as a page at NBC. When the United States entered World War II, he began working at Lockheed as a riveter.

His military service is unclear; he possibly enlisted in the U.S. Navy or Merchant Marines, or both.

After the war, Pyle returned to work at Lockheed and married his first wife, Marilee.

== Career ==
Through the encouragement of actor friend Sidney Gordon, Pyle landed a part in a play. It did well, so he began to study acting and joined the American Repertory Theater. During this time, after being seen in Ring Around Elizabeth at the Glendale Center Theater, he was cast in the films The Guilt of Janet Ames (1947) and The Man from Colorado (1948). Other bit parts followed, until 1955 when he was cast as outlaw Ben Thompson on The Life and Legend of Wyatt Earp, after which he became an established actor.

=== Limited roles ===
Pyle guest-starred 14 times between 1951 and 1953 on the syndicated television series The Range Rider with Jock Mahoney and Dick Jones, and appeared as an outlaw in a 1951 episode of the television series The Lone Ranger titled "Backtrail," then as a deputy in the episode "The Hooded Men" and returned in episode 71 "The Outcast", episode 166 "Woman in the White Mask" and episode 187 "Cross of Santo Domingo". He also appeared in "Frontier Range", a 1951 episode of The Gene Autry Show.

In 1953, Pyle appeared on The Roy Rogers Show (season two, "Loaded Guns") as the wrongly accused killer, ranch hand Tom Larrabee. Also in 1953, Pyle played Emil Hatch in episode 46 of The Adventures of Superman entitled "Beware the Wrecker". He had a part in the 1955 Audie Murphy film To Hell and Back, and appeared twice on NBC's 1955–1956 Western anthology series Frontier (in "Mother of the Brave" and in "The Voyage of Captain Castle").

Pyle was twice cast on CBS's Public Defender in the role of George Hansen, and three times on the religious anthology series, Crossroads on ABC. He acted the part of a police detective in the 1956 film noir Please Murder Me, starring Raymond Burr.

Pyle was cast as Carter in the 1955 episode "Joey's Father" on Fury. Three years later, he played an arsonist in the episode "The Fire Watchers" of the same series. In 1956, Pyle appeared as Vance Kiley in the episode called "Quicksand" in the TV Western series The Lone Ranger. That same year, he played "Willie Calhoun", a lovestruck, and soon-to-be murderer, in season 2's "Poor Pearl" on Gunsmoke.

He appeared as a professor in the syndicated Men into Space series' 1959 episode "Moonquake". In an episode of Ripcord, he played a suicidal parachutist. Also in 1959, he returned to Gunsmoke, playing the lead character Mike Blocker in the episode "The Bear". He was cast as Big Red in the 1959 episode "Woman in the River" of the detective series Bourbon Street Beat, starring Andrew Duggan and Richard Long.

Pyle appeared twice each on the CBS Western series My Friend Flicka and NBC's The Restless Gun with John Payne. He guest-starred with Grant Withers in the 1959 episode "Tumbleweed Ranger" of Tris Coffin's syndicated Western series 26 Men, billed as true stories of the Arizona Rangers. He appeared seven times on Richard Boone's CBS Western Have Gun – Will Travel; his final appearance was on the show in 1960 as the character Croft in "The Puppeteer". He guest-starred in 1960 in several other Westerns, including Pony Express, The Man from Blackhawk, and Tombstone Territory. He made several appearances as Briscoe Darling, on The Andy Griffith Show.

Pyle was cast in a number of Western movies by John Ford, including The Horse Soldiers with William Holden and The Man Who Shot Liberty Valance. He played a Tennessee soldier (called Thimblerig) in John Wayne's The Alamo (1960). He portrayed Sam Houston in several episodes of CBS's The Adventures of Jim Bowie. He guest-starred as a law-enforcement officer in Jim Davis' other syndicated series, Rescue 8, and also appeared in an episode of the ABC sitcom, The Real McCoys with Walter Brennan.

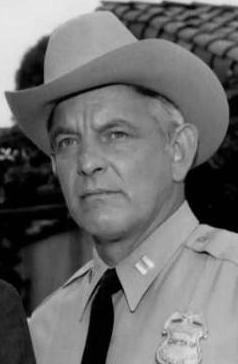
Pyle as Captain Lister in the 1962 Kraft Mystery Theatre episode "Cry Ruin"

Pyle was cast in the 1960 episode "Three Wise Men" of ABC's Stagecoach West as an outlaw who promises to turn himself into the authorities if he can spend Christmas with his family. About this time, Pyle appeared in the segment "Lawyer in Petticoats" of William Bendix's 1960 NBC Western series Overland Trail with Doug McClure, and thereafter in 1961 in "Hand of Vengeance" in the syndicated Western series Two Faces West. Pyle was cast as Jed Corrigan in the 1961 episode "The Tramp" of the NBC family drama series National Velvet.

In 1961, Pyle made the first of eight separate appearances on Bonanza, in the third season episode "Springtime". He also appeared in the fourth season episodes "A Hot Day for a Hanging" (1962), "The Boss" (1963), and "Little Man - Ten Feet Tall" (1963); the fifth season's "Bullet for a Bride" (1964), the tenth season's "The Passing of a King" (1968), the twelfth season's "The Wagon" (1970), and finally in "Riot" (1972) in the fourteenth season.

Pyle guest-starred twice on the CBS series Route 66 with Martin Milner and George Maharis, first in 1961 in the episode "The Newborn" and again in 1962 in "A Long Piece of Mischief". He appeared as the father of the doomed family in the dystopian episode "Black Leather Jackets" of The Twilight Zone.

In 1963, Pyle guest-starred on The Dick Van Dyke Show as Uncle George in the episode "Uncle George".

He appeared twice in Cheyenne, starring Clint Walker. He played Sergeant Tripp in the episode "The Enemy" of the James Arness ABC series How the West Was Won. Pyle also had guest-starring roles on The Rifleman.

He also is known for portraying both the suspect and the murder victim on the last original Perry Mason TV episode, "The Case of the Final Fadeout", in 1966. He was one of 11 actors to hit the Perry Mason trifecta, portraying a victim, a defendant, and the actual murderer (in previous episodes) on the series, which he did in five appearances. Among his other appearances, he played defendant Robert Crane in "The Case of the Deadly Double" in 1958, Tom Quincy in "The Case of the Ominous Outcast" in 1960, Tilden Stuart in "The Case of the Jealous Journalist", Emery Fillmore in "The Case of the Renegade Refugee" (both in 1961), and Frank Honer in "The Case of the Shifty Shoebox" in 1963.

Pyle portrayed the vengeful Texas Ranger Frank Hamer in the 1967 movie Bonnie and Clyde. He also appeared in an episode of The High Chaparral as a general who had lost his son.

In 1968, he appeared as Titus Purcell, patriarch of a family of homesteaders, in the episode "The Price of Tomatoes" in the sitcom Gomer Pyle - U.S.M.C. Working for the first time with Jim Nabors playing Gomer Pyle, spun-off from The Andy Griffith Show, he used a screen persona similar to Briscoe Darling Jr. In 1968, he also directed "The Great Diamond Mines" on Death Valley Days.

Pyle had a guest-starring role in 1973 on The Streets of San Francisco. In 1975, Walt Disney Productions released a film based on the novel Escape to Witch Mountain. In this film, Tony and Tia were played by Ike Eisenmann and Kim Richards, Lucas Deranian by Donald Pleasence, and the children's Uncle Bené by Pyle. In 1976, he appeared on Barnaby Jones in an episode titled "Stalking Horse". He appeared as a mayor residing in the town of Purgatory in the first-season episode of Kung Fu, titled "Ancient Warrior". He also appeared in second-season episode "Crossties" as a doctor. In 1985 (season 9, episode 8), Pyle made a guest appearance on The Love Boat.

=== Leading role ===
Pyle played the titular role in a theatrical film entitled Guardian of the Wilderness (1976) about Galen Clark, the true story of an explorer who persuaded Abraham Lincoln to have the Yosemite area set aside from commercial development, the original forerunner of the American national parks system. Clark was prompted by his decision to do all he could to preserve the Mariposa Grove of giant sequoias from being destroyed by loggers, along with the surrounding land. Pyle was the top-billed lead in this theatrical motion picture shot on location. John Dehner portrayed legendary naturalist John Muir and Ford Rainey played President Lincoln. The movie is also known by its alternate title Mountain Man.

=== Continuing roles ===
One of Pyle's more endearing roles was that of Briscoe Darling Jr., on The Andy Griffith Show (1960–1966). Pyle played the patriarch of the Darling family, a group of sons (all portrayed by The Dillards), and one daughter, Charlene, portrayed by Maggie Peterson. He appeared in seven episodes, six written by the comedy-writing team of Jim Fritzell and Everett Greenbaum.

During the 1965–1966 television season he portrayed the recurring role of Grandpa Tarleton in Tammy.

He played Buck Webb (Doris Day's television series father) during the first two seasons of CBS's The Doris Day Show (1968–1970). In real life, Pyle was only two years older than Day. Pyle said in 1968 that he based his acting in that role on his father's personality.

Pyle played the role of Mad Jack in 36 episodes of the NBC series The Life and Times of Grizzly Adams (1977–1978).

His best-known and longest-running television role was that of Uncle Jesse Duke in the CBS series The Dukes of Hazzard (1979–1985) (146 episodes).

=== Later years ===
In his later life, Pyle played mostly cameo television roles and retired from full-time acting. His last film role was in the 1994 film Maverick. His final acting role was as Jesse Duke in the 1997 CBS made-for-television movie The Dukes of Hazzard: Reunion!

== Charitable efforts ==
Pyle sponsored Uncle Jesse's Fishing Tournament in Lamar County, Texas. In ten years of operation, the tournament raised more than $160,000 to support children's programs there. First established in 1988, the tournament is still going strong and celebrated its 30th anniversary in 2017. It continues to support the children's charities of Lamar County.

== Recognition ==
Pyle has a star in the Motion Pictures section of the Hollywood Walk of Fame at 7083 Hollywood Boulevard. It was dedicated on December 12, 1997.

In 1991, the Texas Senate passed a resolution honoring Pyle and his wife for their work with Special Olympics and the Denver Pyle's Children's Charities.

== Oil wealth ==
Within a few years of his final episode on The Andy Griffith Show, "The Darling Fortune", Pyle began investing in oil, buying oil wells thought to be near the end of their working lifetimes cheaply at a time when the price of oil was $2.15 per barrel. By 1981, after new technologies allowed the remaining oil to be more economically recovered from the wells and the 1973 oil crisis triggered a rise in prices to over $46 a barrel, he was very wealthy, having made much more money from oil than his total earnings in over 30 years as an actor. He said that he continued to work as an actor because "I look at it this way, acting provides the cash flow I need for oil speculation, and besides that I like acting. It's fun."

== Personal life ==
In 1955, Pyle married Marilee Carpenter, a production assistant at 20th Century Fox. They had sons David and Tony. Marilee and Denver divorced in 1970. On November 5, 1983, Pyle married Tippie X. Johnston in Los Angeles County, California. The union lasted until his death.

== Death ==
Pyle died of lung cancer on Christmas Day 1997. Memorial services were held January 6, 1998, at First Baptist Church in Waxahachie, Texas. He is buried in an unmarked grave at the Forreston Cemetery in Forreston, Texas. His remains are interred beside those of his second wife's parents, James Thomas Johnston and Erin Maurine (née Birch) Johnston.

== Filmography ==
=== Film ===
- The Guilt of Janet Ames (1947) as Masher (uncredited)
- Devil Ship (1947) as Carl
- Train to Alcatraz (1948) as Hutch Hutchins
- Marshal of Amarillo (1948) as The Night Clerk
- The Man from Colorado (1948) as Easy Jarrett (uncredited)
- El Paso (1949) as Vigilante (uncredited)
- Streets of San Francisco (1949) as Ed Quinn
- Red Canyon (1949) as Hutch
- Hellfire (1949) as Rex
- Rim of the Canyon (1949) as Cash Collins (uncredited)
- Too Late for Tears (1949) as Youth at Union Station (uncredited)
- Flame of Youth (1949) as Lytz
- The Big Wheel (1949) as Doctor
- The Flying Saucer (1950) as Turner
- Captain China (1950) as Steve
- Singing Guns (1950) as Richards Henchman
- Federal Agent at Large (1950) as 'Jumpy' Jordan
- Dynamite Pass (1950) as Thurber Henchman
- Customs Agent (1950) as Al
- The Old Frontier (1950) as Henchman George
- Rough Riders of Durango (1951) as Henchman Lacey
- Million Dollar Pursuit (1951) as Nick Algren
- Drums in the Deep South (1951) as Union Soldier Breaking Window (uncredited)
- The Hills of Utah (1951) as Bowie French
- Mutiny (1952) as Gunner / Mutineer (uncredited)
- Oklahoma Annie (1952) as Skip
- Man from the Black Hills (1952) as Glenn Hartley
- Desert Passage (1952) as Allen
- Fargo (1952) as Carey
- Canyon Ambush (1952) as Tom Carlton-Replaced (credit only)
- The Maverick (1952) as Bud Karnes
- Gunsmoke (1953) as Greasy (uncredited)
- Fort Vengeance (1953) as Rider Warning About Wagon Train (uncredited)
- A Perilous Journey (1953) as Bartender (uncredited)
- The Lone Hand (1953) as Regulator (uncredited)
- Rebel City (1953) as Greeley
- Column South (1953) as Confederate Spy in Yankee Uniform (uncredited)
- Goldtown Ghost Riders (1953) as Bernie Malloy (uncredited)
- Topeka (1953) as Jonas Bailey
- Vigilante Terror (1953) as Henchman Sperry
- Texas Bad Man (1953) as Tench
- The Command (1954) as Infantryman (uncredited)
- Ride Clear of Diablo (1954) as Reverend Moorehead
- The Boy from Oklahoma (1954) as Bagley (uncredited)
- Johnny Guitar (1954) as Posseman (uncredited)
- Drum Beat (1954) as Fairchild (uncredited)
- The Yellow Mountain (1954) as George Yost (uncredited)
- Ten Wanted Men (1955) as Dave Weed (uncredited)
- Rage at Dawn (1955) as Clint Reno
- Run for Cover (1955) as Harvey (uncredited)
- To Hell and Back (1955) as Thompson
- Top Gun (1955) as Hank Spencer (uncredited)
- Please Murder Me (1956) as Lieut. Bradley
- I Killed Wild Bill Hickok (1956) as Jim Bailey
- The Naked Hills (1956) as Bert Killian / Narrator
- Yaqui Drums (1956) as Lefty Barr
- 7th Cavalry (1956) as Dixon
- Gun Duel in Durango (1957) as Ranger Captain
- Destination 60,000 (1957) as Mickey Hill
- The Lonely Man (1957) as Brad, Red Bluff Sheriff
- Jet Pilot (1957) as Mr. Simpson (uncredited)
- Domino Kid (1957) as Bill Dragger (uncredited)
- The Left Handed Gun (1958) as Ollinger
- Fort Massacre (1958) as Collins
- China Doll (1958) as Col. Wiley
- The Party Crashers (1958) as Ted Bickford
- Good Day for a Hanging (1959) as Deputy Ed Moore
- King of the Wild Stallions (1959) as Doc Webber
- The Horse Soldiers (1959) as Jackie Jo
- Cast a Long Shadow (1959) as Preacher Harrison
- Home from the Hill (1960) as Mr. Bradley (uncredited)
- The Alamo (1960) as Thimblerig (the Gambler)
- The Man Who Shot Liberty Valance (1962) as Amos Carruthers
- Geronimo (1962) as Senator Conrad
- Terrified (1963) as Sheriff Dixon
- Mail Order Bride (1964) as Preacher Pope
- Black Like Me (1964) as Man in pick-up truck
- Cheyenne Autumn (1964) as Senator Henry (uncredited)
- The Rounders (1965) as Bull
- Mara of the Wilderness (1965) as Kelly
- Shenandoah (1965) as Pastor Bjoerling
- The Great Race (1965) as Sheriff
- Incident at Phantom Hill (1966) as 1st Hunter
- Gunpoint (1966) as Cap
- Tammy and the Millionaire (1967) as Grandpa Mordecai Tarleton
- Welcome to Hard Times (1967) as Alfie — Stage Driver
- Bonnie and Clyde (1967) as Frank Hamer
- Bandolero! (1968) as Muncie Carter
- 5 Card Stud (1968) as Sig Evers
- Something Big (1971) as Junior Frisbee
- The Legend of Hillbilly John (1972) as Grandpappy John
- Cahill U.S. Marshal (1973) as Denver
- Escape to Witch Mountain (1975) as Uncle Bené
- The Boy Who Talked to Badgers (1975) as Ben as an Adult
- The Adventures of Frontier Fremont (1976) as Big Bill Driggers
- Hawmps! (1976) as Col. Seymour Hawkins
- Buffalo Bill and the Indians, or Sitting Bull's History Lesson (1976) as The Indian Agent
- Welcome to L.A. (1976) as Carl Barber
- Guardian of the Wilderness (1976) as Galen Clark
- Return from Witch Mountain (1978) as Uncle Bené
- Legend of the Northwest (1978) as Abner
- How Bugs Bunny Won The West (1978) as The Narrator
- Legend of the Wild (1981)
- Delta Fever (1987) as Walt
- Podunk Possum in "One Step Beyond" (1996) as Podunk Possum

=== Television ===
Denver Pyle television credits
Year	Title	Role	Notes	Ref.
1953	Death Valley Days	Art Crowley	Episode: "Swamper Ike" (S1.E12)	
1954	Adventures of Superman	Hatch	Episode: "Beware the Wrecker" (S2.E20)	
1955–1960	The Life and Legend of Wyatt Earp	Ben Thompson	10 episodes	
1956	The Millionaire	Arthur Darner	Episode: "The Arthur Darner Story" (S2.E21)	
1956	Gunsmoke	Willie Calhoun	Episode: "Poor Pearl" (S2.E13)	
1957	Gunsmoke	Hank Shinn	Episode: "Liar From Blackhawk" (S2.E38)	
1957	Have Gun – Will Travel	Clay Sommers	Episode: "The Colonel and the Lady" (S1.E11)	
1957	The Restless Gun	Sheriff Jay	Episode: "Rink" (S1.E4)	
1959	The Restless Gun	Jeb	Episode: "The Pawn" (S2.E27)	
1959	Gunsmoke	Mike Blocker	Episode: "The Bear" (S4.E25)	
1959	Bat Masterson	Dan Morgan	Episode: "Marked Deck" (S1.E21)	
1959	The Rifleman	Henry Trumble	Episode: "Bloodlines" (S2.E2)	
1959	The Rifleman	Seth Mitchell	Episode: "The Legacy" (S2.E11)	
1959	The Life and Legend of Wyatt Earp	Rev. Oliver Tittle	Episode: "A Good Man" (S4.E17)	
1960	The Life and Legend of Wyatt Earp	Dobie Jenner	Episode: "A Murderer’s Return" (S5.E19)	
1960	The Life and Legend of Wyatt Earp	Hoss Mackey	Episode: "The Too Perfect Crime" (S6.E10)	
1960	The Rifleman	Harold Tenner	Episode: "The Hangman" (S2.E36)	
1960	Perry Mason	Tom Quincy	Episode: "The Case of the Ominous Outcast" (S3.E24)	
1960	The Tall Man	Marshal Dave Leggert	Episode: "Garrett and the Kid" (S1.E1)	
1960	Have Gun - Will Travel	Colonel Celine	Episode: "Ransom" (S3.E37)	
1960	Have Gun Will - Travel	Advent	Episode: "The Calf" (S4.E6)	
1960	Have Gun - Will Travel	General George "Pawnee" Croft	Episode: "The Puppeteer" (S4.E15)	
1961	Bonanza	Theodore 'Ted' Hackett	Episode: "Springtime" (S3.E2)	
1961	The Rifleman	George Tanner	Episode: "The Clarence Bibs Story" (S3.E28)	
1961	The Rifleman	Frank Hazlitt	Episode: "The Decision" (S4.E6)	
1962	Bonanza	Sheriff Tom Stedman	Episode: "A Hot Day for a Hanging" (S4.E4)	
1962	Kraft Mystery Theatre	Captain Lister	Episode: "Cry Ruin"	
1963	The Dick Van Dyke Show	Uncle George	Episode: "Uncle George" (S3.E8)	
1963	Bonanza	Sheriff Ed	2 episodes	
1963–1966	The Andy Griffith Show	Briscoe Darling	6 episodes	
1964	Bonanza	Marcus Caldwell	Episode: "Bullet for a Bride" (S5.E20)	
1964	The Twilight Zone	Stuart Tillman	Episode: "Black Leather Jackets" (S5.E18)	
1965	Gunsmoke	Cousin Claudius	Episode: "Deputy Festus" (S10.E17)	
1965–1966	Tammy	Grandpa Mordecai Tarleton	Main role	
1966	Gunsmoke	Caleb Nash	Episode: "The Goldtakers" (S12.E2)	
1967	Gunsmoke	Dr. Henry S. Rand	Episode: "Mad Dog" (S12.E17)	
1968	Bonanza	Claude Roman	Episode: "The Passing of a King" (S10.E5)	
1968–1970	The Doris Day Show	Buck Webb	Regular role	
1970	Bonanza	Price Buchanan	Episode: "The Wagon" (S12.E4)	
1970	Here Come the Brides	Duncan Bolt	Episode: "Bolt of Kilmaren" (S2.E23)	
1972	Bonanza	Warden	Episode: "Riot" (S14.E4)	
1977–1978	The Life and Times of Grizzly Adams	Mad Jack	Main role	
1979–1985	The Dukes of Hazzard	Uncle Jesse Duke	Main role	
1980	Enos	Uncle Jesse Duke	2 episodes	
1983	The Dukes	Uncle Jesse Duke (voice)	Main role	
1986	Return to Mayberry	Briscoe Darling	Television film	
1997	The Dukes of Hazzard: Reunion!	Uncle Jesse Duke	Television film	

==== Director ====
Additionally, he directed ten episodes of Death Valley Days, ten episodes of The Doris Day Show, and twelve episodes of The Dukes of Hazzard.
