= Galen Clark =

Canadian-born American conservationist and writer (1814-1910)

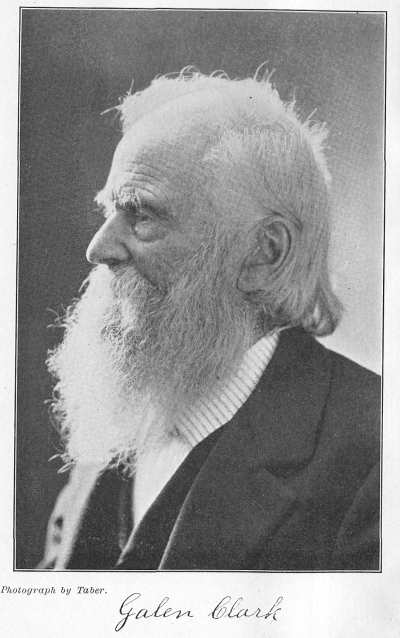
- Galen Clark
- Born: March 28, 1814; Shipton, Lower Canada
- Died: March 24, 1910 (aged 95); Oakland, California, U.S.
- Resting place: Yosemite Cemetery
- Children: Elvira Missouri Clark (1840-1912); Joseph Locke Clark (1842-1862); Mary Ann Clark (1844-1919); Calen Alonzo Clark (1847-1873); Solon McCoy Clark (1848-1857)

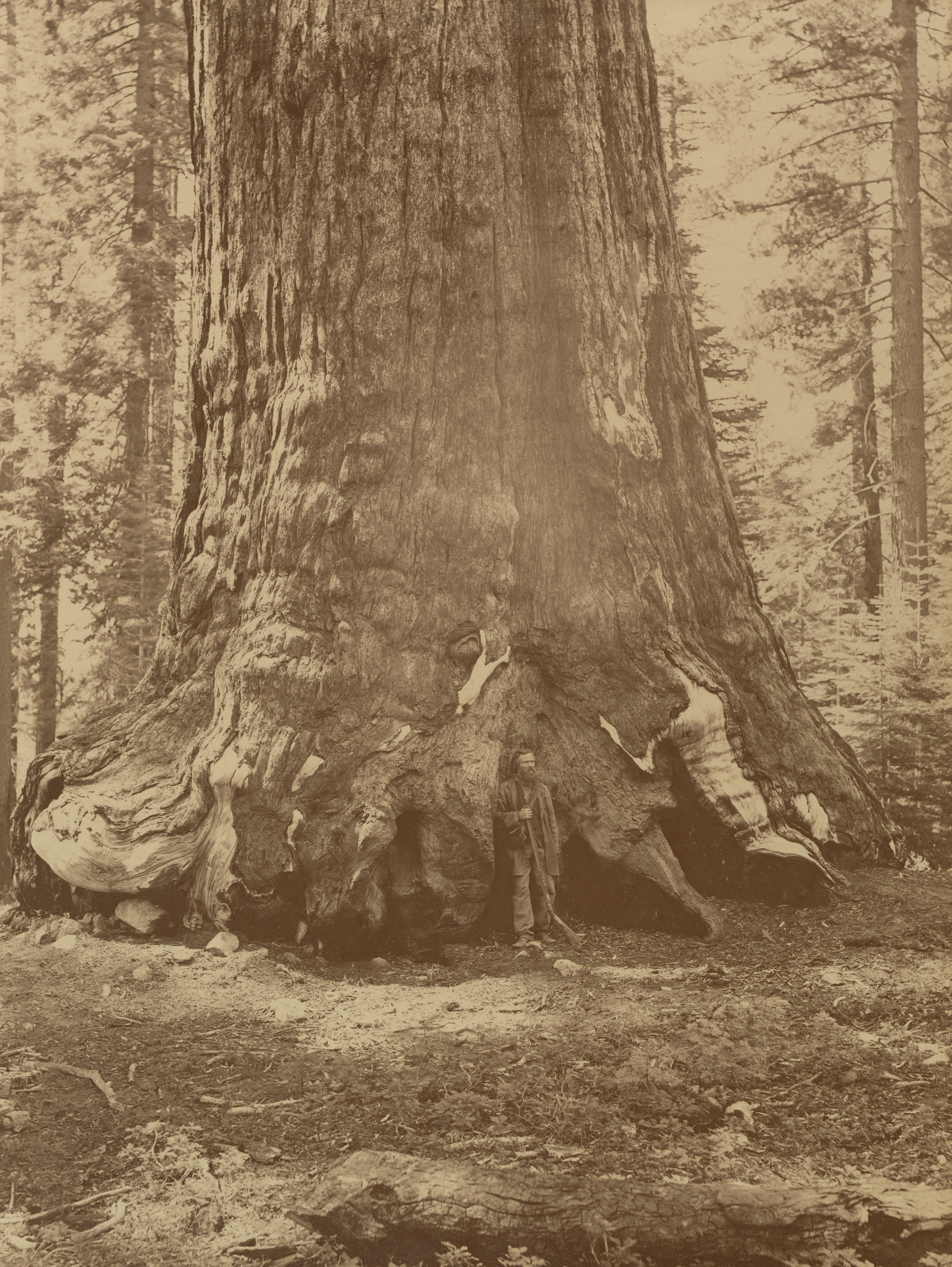
Galen Clark in the Big Tree Grove, photo by Carleton E. Watkins, c. 1865-66

Galen Clark (March 28, 1814 – March 24, 1910) was a Canadian-born American conservationist and writer. He is known as the first European American to discover the Mariposa Grove of Giant Sequoia trees and helped secure legislation to protect it and the Yosemite area. For 24 years he served as Guardian of Yosemite National Park.

== Early life and family ==
Galen Clark was born in Shipton, Lower Canada (now Quebec) in 1814. He joined the westward migration as a youth and moved to Waterloo, Missouri in 1836.

In Missouri, he met Rebecca McCoy, and they married in 1839. They had five children: Elvira Missouri Clark (1840–1912), Joseph Locke Clark (1842–1862), Mary Ann Clark (1844–1919), Calen Alonzo Clark (1847–1873), and Solon McCoy Clark (1848–1857). Only two survived their parents: Elvira Clark, who married and became a doctor in Oakland, California; and their other daughter, Mary Ann Clark, who married John T. Regan of Springfield, Massachusetts.

== Later life ==
After his wife died young, Clark moved to California to seek his fortune in 1854 at the time of the California Gold Rush. In 1857, at the age of 43, Clark contracted a severe lung infection that was diagnosed as consumption. Doctors gave him six months to live, as they had no antibiotic treatment at the time, but counseled rest and outdoor air.

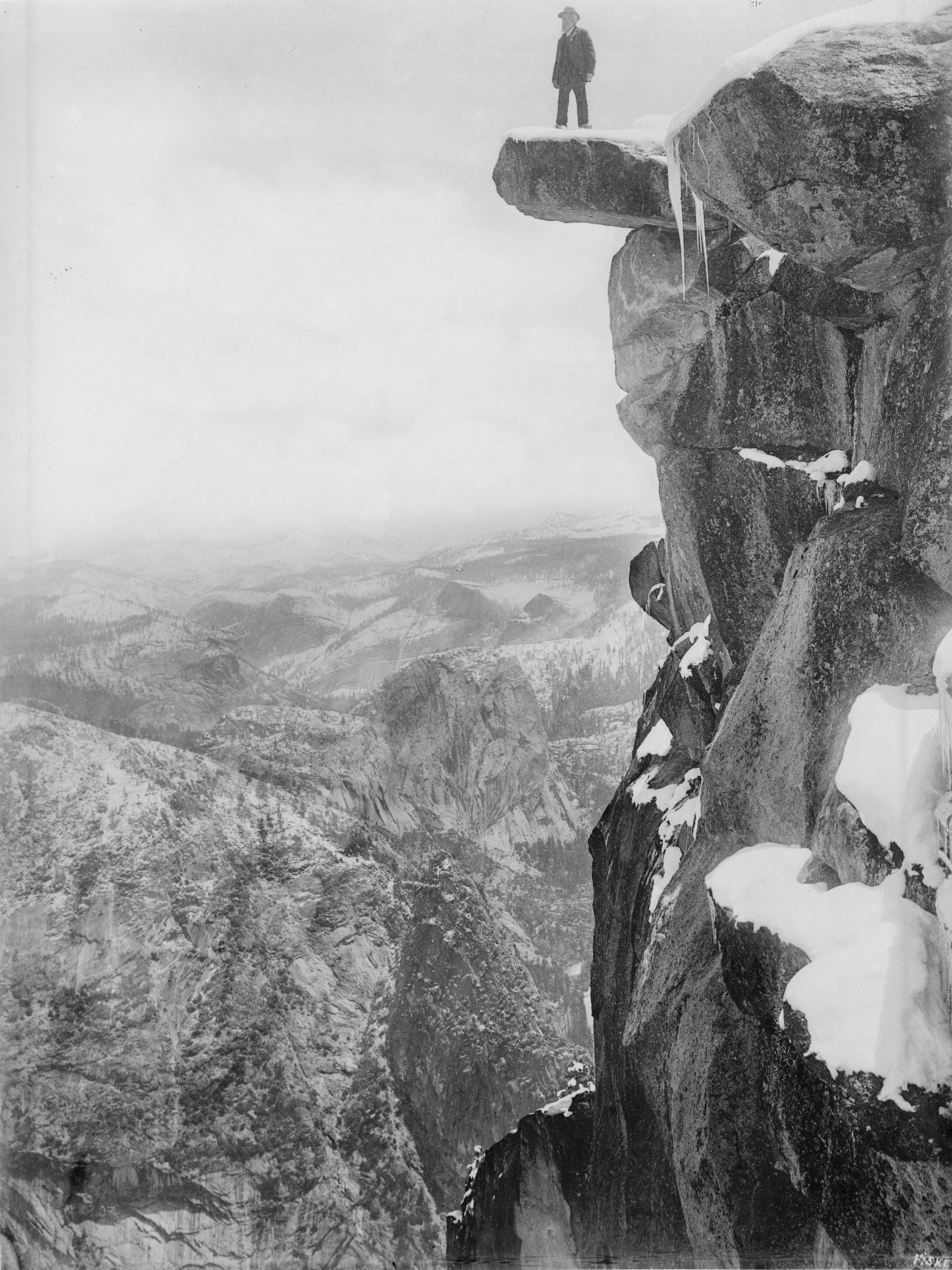
Clark on Glacier Point in Yosemite National Park, ca.1900

Clark moved to the Wawona, California area. "I went to the mountains to take my chances of dying or growing better, which I thought were about even." (Galen Clark, 1856) Upon his discovery of the Mariposa Grove of Giant Sequoias, Clark spent most of his time exploring the area and teaching others about the mysteries of the giant, cinnamon-colored trees.

He wrote about protecting the grove to friends and the US Congress. He contributed to the writing and passage of legislation to protect the area, gaining support of US Senator John Conness from California. The act for the Yosemite Grant was signed into law by President Abraham Lincoln. Ceding the land to the state of California for preservation, the grant was the first of its kind. The legislation was to protect Yosemite Valley and the Mariposa Grove of Giant Sequoias for "public use, resort, and recreation ... to be left inalienable for all time." Clark became the first "guardian of the grant". His lungs healed, and he explored and climbed much of the area.

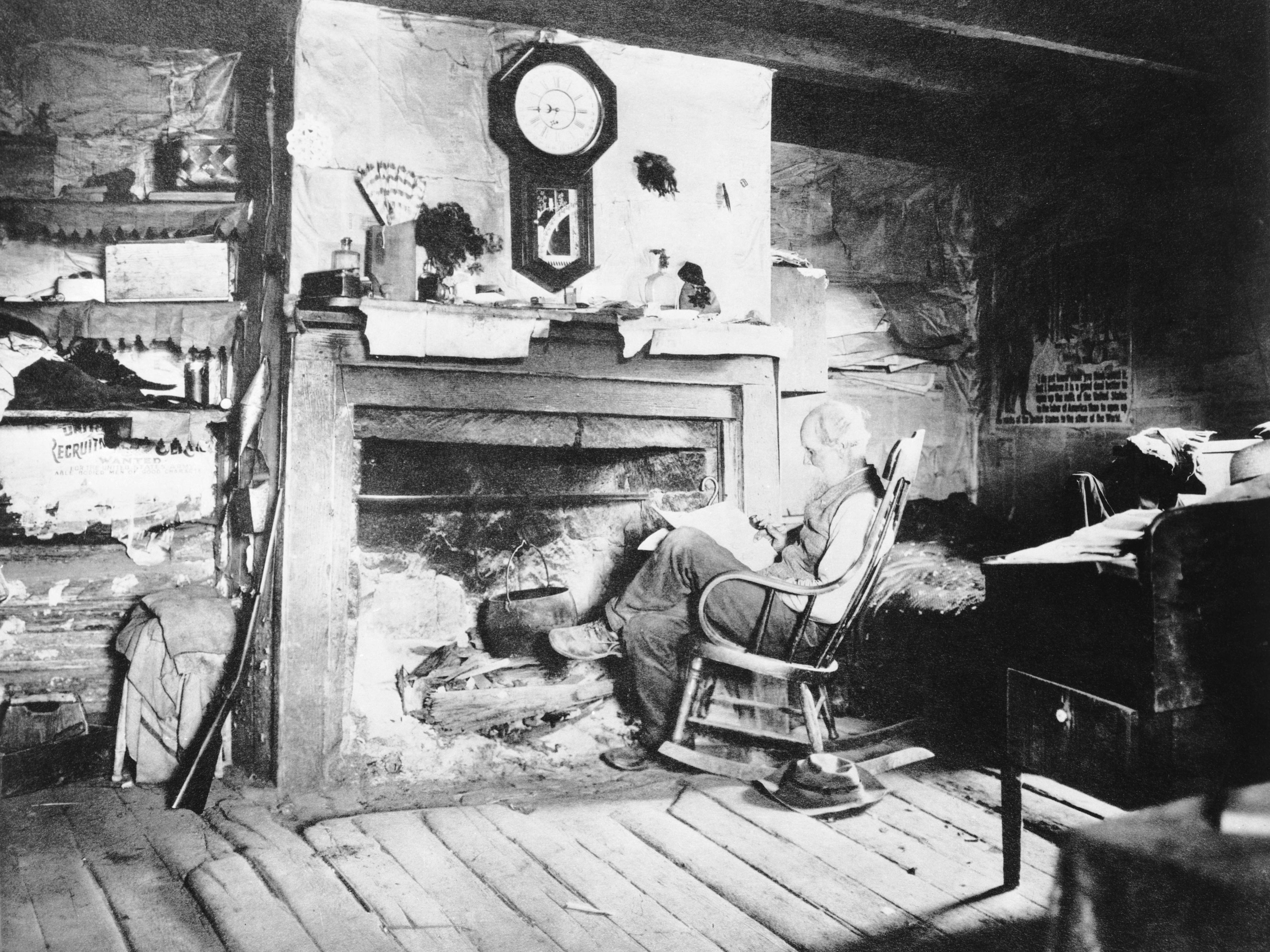
Portrait of Clark in his later years

Clark did not seek to enrich himself from Yosemite Valley or the Sequoia trees. He ran a modest hotel and guide service. A poor businessman, he was constantly in debt. His Clark's Station, for example, had several more employees than required for the number of guests and its short season.

Toward the end of his life, Clark was desperately poor. He wrote three books on Yosemite. These include Indians of the Yosemite (1904) and The Yosemite Valley (1910). Clark's book on the sequoia trees is simple, factual, and direct. He left out his personal role in the discovery, popularization, and protection of the Mariposa Grove of Big Trees. He served as hotel keeper, guide, and guardian of Yosemite and the Mariposa Grove.

Clark spent some time living in Summerland, a Spiritualist colony in Southern California, near Santa Barbara. His house still stands on Shelby Street.

On March 24, 1910, he died at the home of his daughter Dr. Elvira M. Lee in Oakland, California. He was buried at a spot near Yosemite Falls which he personally selected and dug decades prior to his death. He had also selected the granite tombstone marker and planted around his gravesite seedlings from the Mariposa Grove sequoias.

== Legacy and honors ==
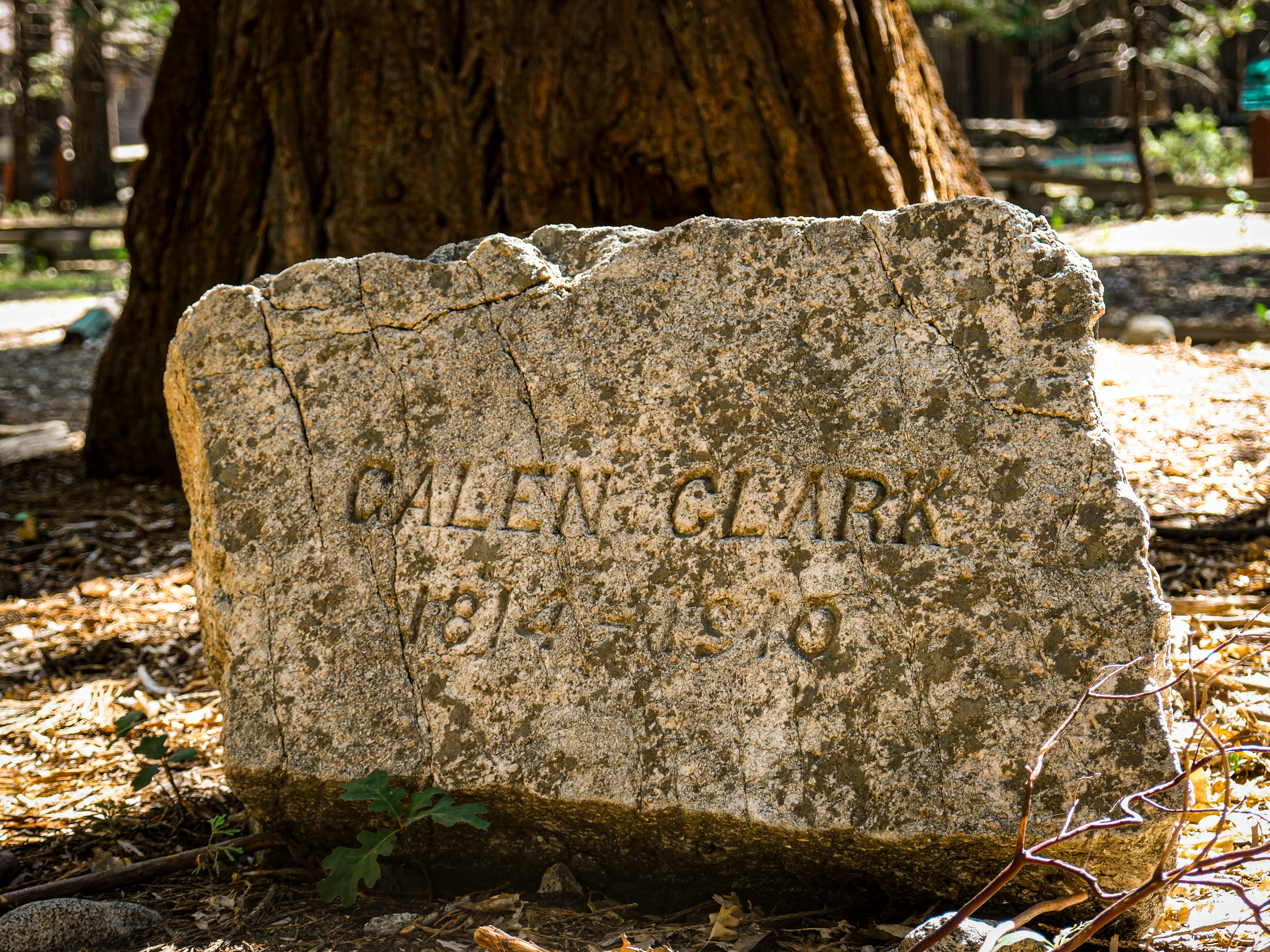
Galen Clark's grave marker in Yosemite Cemetery.

Clark gained preservation of what became Yosemite National Park and raised awareness of the wilderness, setting an example for the preservation of other ecosystems and wilderness areas. The Giant Sequoia that would have been the first of its kind to be seen by Clark at the Mariposa Grove is named and marked "Galen Clark Tree" (240 feet; diameter 15.3 at 10 feet above mean base) in memory of his contribution to the preservation of the Giant Sequoia ecosystem and the idea of the national park.

- Mount Clark and the Clark Range, located east of Yosemite Valley, were named in his honor.

The Mariposa Grove Museum, originally built as a cabin by Clark in 1864 within the Mariposa Grove, is listed on the National Register of Historic Places.

== In popular culture ==
Clark's life and efforts to preserve the Giant Sequoias of Yosemite were depicted in the 1976 feature film Guardian of the Wilderness (also known as Mountain Man). He was portrayed by Denver Pyle with John Dehner as John Muir and Ford Rainey as Abraham Lincoln.

== Bibliography ==
- Clark, Galen (1904). Indians of the Yosemite valley and vicinity, their history, customs and traditions. Yosemite Valley, Calif: G. Clark. OCLC 65664888.
- Clark, Galen (1907). The big trees of California, their history and characteristics. Yosemite Valley, Cal: G. Clark [Redondo, Cal: Press of Reflex Pub. Co.] OCLC 344915.
- Clark, Galen (April 1909). "Yosemite: Past and Present". Sunset.
- Clark, Galen (1910). The Yosemite Valley, its history, characteristic features, and theories regarding its origin. Yosemite Valley, Cal: N. L. Salter. OCLC 4721921.
- Clark, Galen (1964). Early days in Yosemite Valley. Los Angeles. OCLC 4175271. Originally published as "A Plea for Yosemite" in Yosemite Nature Notes (February 1927), from a manuscript written c. 1907.

== See also ==
- History of the Yosemite area
