= Waterloo, Missouri =

Waterloo, Missouri may refer to the following places in the U.S. state of Missouri:

- Waterloo, Clark County, Missouri, an unincorporated community
- Waterloo, Lafayette County, Missouri, an unincorporated community
