= Ford Rainey =

American actor (1908–2005)

- Rainey in Window on Main Street, 1961
- Born: Ford Rainey; August 8, 1908; Mountain Home, Idaho, U.S.
- Died: July 25, 2005 (aged 96); Santa Monica, California, U.S.
- Resting place: Pierce Brothers Westwood Village Memorial Park and Mortuary
- Other name: Ford Raney
- Education: Centralia College; Cornish College of the Arts
- Occupation: Actor
- Years active: 1939–2003
- Spouse: Sheila Hayden (m. 1954)
- Children: 3

Ford Rainey (August 8, 1908 – July 25, 2005) was an American film, stage, and television actor.

== Early life ==
Rainey was born in Mountain Home, Idaho, the son of Vyrna (née Kinkade), a teacher, and Archie Coleman Rainey. He first acted on the stage while a student at Centralia High School, where he graduated in 1927. Rainey graduated from Centralia Junior College in Washington state and in 1933 from the Cornish School, now Cornish College of the Arts, in Seattle.

He then moved to Connecticut to study acting at the Michael Chekhov Theatre Studio. Growing up in the outdoors and learning to ride horses helped him in his career as a tough-guy film presence later in life. Like many young actors, he worked odd jobs, including as a logger, fisherman, fruit picker, carpenter, and clam digger, in addition to working on an oil tanker before becoming a successful actor.

He served in the U.S. Coast Guard during World War II.

== Career ==
Rainey worked at radio stations KJR and KOMO in Seattle, Washington.

He made his film debut in White Heat starring James Cagney in 1949 and became a familiar face in motion pictures, appearing in Perfect Strangers (1950) with Ginger Rogers, Two Rode Together (1961) with James Stewart and Richard Widmark, 40 Pounds of Trouble (1962) with Tony Curtis, Johnny Tiger (1966) with Robert Taylor, and The Sand Pebbles (1966) with Steve McQueen. His other film credits included The Gypsy Moths (1969) with Burt Lancaster and Deborah Kerr, The Naked Zoo (1970) with Rita Hayworth, The Traveling Executioner (1970), My Old Man's Place (1971), Sixteen (1973), the horror films Halloween II (1981) and The Cellar (1989), Bed & Breakfast (1992) with Roger Moore and Inferno (1999). He also co-starred in the acclaimed television movie My Sweet Charlie (1970), and appeared in other TV movies such as A Howling in the Woods (1971) and The Stranger Who Looks Like Me (1974) with Meredith Baxter and Beau Bridges.

He guest-starred on such television series as The Adventures of Kit Carson, Bonanza, The Invaders, The Brothers Brannagan (in the 1961 series finale "The Hunter and the Hunted"), The Tall Man with Clu Gulager, Stoney Burke, Daniel Boone with Fess Parker, Gunsmoke, The Wild Wild West S3 E14 as Garrison in "The Night of the Iron Fist" (1967), Empire, Dundee and the Culhane, Baa Baa Black Sheep, How the West Was Won aka The Macahans, The Untouchables with Robert Stack, and the 1976 western Sara.

In the 1961–62 season, Rainey co-starred with Robert Young in the CBS series Window on Main Street, in which he portrayed newspaper editor Lloyd Ramsey. In 1963–1964, he was a member of the regular cast of the NBC anthology series The Richard Boone Show. He portrayed Dr. Barnett on the NBC crime drama Search in 1972–1973, he had the role of Police Chief Vernon in Tenafly in 1973–1974, and he played James Barrett on the crime drama The Manhunter on CBS in 1974–1975.

Between 1962 and 1965, Rainey made four guest appearances on the CBS courtroom series Perry Mason, beginning with the role of Russell Durham in "The Case of the Unsuitable Uncle." In 1964 he played murder victim Harry Trilling in "The Case of the Ugly Duckling." Randolph Cartwell in "The Case of the Paper Bullets". In 1965 he played Dr. Fisher in "The case of Fatal Fortune".

During the mid-1960s, Ford played U.S. President Abraham Lincoln in The Time Tunnel episode “The Death Trap” with Robert Colbert, the uncredited President seen on the TV addressing the Robinsons before their launch in the pilot episode of Lost in Space “The Reluctant Stowaway”, as well as the President once more in the “Doomsday” episode of Voyage to the Bottom of the Sea. (He played Lincoln again a decade later in the 1976 theatrical film Guardian of the Wilderness.

Rainey portrayed the adoptive father of Lee Majors's Steve Austin (The Six Million Dollar Man), and the foster father of Jaime Sommers (The Bionic Woman). He appeared in the 1978 episode of Little House on the Prairie, I'll Be Waving as You Drive Away, and in the 1987 miniseries Amerika.

Rainey played a general in the 1980 M*A*S*H episode "Dreams," and a judge on both The Waltons and Matlock.

Later television appearances, in the 1990s and 2000s, include ER and recurring roles on Wiseguy, Ned and Stacey, and The King of Queens. He could also be seen in some commercials in the middle 1970s through the 1980s, such as REACH toothbrushes. During that time he was part of Trinity Square Repertory Company in Providence, Rhode Island.

== Personal life and death ==
Ford Rainey was a bachelor until the age of 46, when, in 1954, he married Sheila Hayden and settled in New York City, where sons Robert and James were born. The family moved to Malibu, California, where daughter Kathy was born.

Rainey remained in Malibu with his wife while he acted and enjoyed hobbies such as beekeeping and bird breeding until his death on July 25, 2005, of a stroke, at the age of 96. His interment was in Westwood Village Memorial Park Cemetery.

In May 2012, Ford's 54-year-old chiropractor son Robert Rainey was found murdered in his Los Angeles, California office. The homicide remains unsolved.

== Filmography ==
- White Heat (1949) – Zuckie Hommell (uncredited)
- Perfect Strangers (1950) – Ernest Craig (uncredited)
- The Robe (1953) – Ship's Captain (uncredited)
- The Human Jungle (1954) – Jones – Older Cop (uncredited)
- 3:10 to Yuma (1957) – Bisbee Marshal
- The Badlanders (1958) – Warden
- The Last Mile (1959) – Red Kirby
- John Paul Jones (1959) – Lt. Simpson
- Flaming Star (1960) – Doc Phillips
- Route 66 (1961)
  - - Tom Russell in S1:E16, "Fly Away Home: Part 1"
  - - Tom Russell in S1:E17, "Fly Away Home: Part 2"
- Parrish (1961) – John Donati (uncredited)
- Two Rode Together (1961) – Reverend Henry Clegg
- Ada (1961) – Speaker
- Claudelle Inglish (1961) – Rev. Armstrong
- Dead to the World (1961) – Congressman Keach
- Rawhide (1961)
  - – Sheriff in S3:E30, "Incident of the Wager on Payday"
- Empire (1962)
  - - Josh in S1:E10, "Pressure Lock"
- 40 Pounds of Trouble (1962) - Judge
- Rawhide (1962)
  - – Broken Bow in S5:E8, "Incident of the Dogfaces"
- Gunsmoke (1962)
  - - Tate in S8:E1, "The Search"
- Have Gun - Will Travel (1963)
  - - Warden in S6:E23, "Cage at McNaab"
- Kings of the Sun (1963) – The Chief
- The Outer Limits (1964)
  - - D.A. Thomas Coyle in S2:E9, "I, Robot"
- Rawhide (1965)
  - - Col. Hart in S7:E23, "Retreat"
- The Big Valley (1965)
  - - Colin Murdoch in S1:E6, "Heritage"
- Slattery's People (1965)
  - - Daniel Ralston in S1:E25, "Question: What Time Is the Next Bandwagon?"
  - - Anson Holbrook in S2:E7, "The Hero"
- Gunsmoke (1965)
  - - Hode Embry in S10:E21, "Song for Dying"
- Gunpoint (1966) – Tom Emerson
- Johnny Tiger (1966) – Sam Tiger
- The Fugitive (1966)
  - - Lieutenant C. Wynn in S3:E19, "Echo of a Nightmare"
  - - Oliver Corman in S4:E5, "Ten Thousand Pieces of Silver"
- The Time Tunnel (1966)
  - - Abraham Lincoln in S1:E12, "The Death Trap"
- Iron Horse (1966)
  - - Ross in S1:E15, "A Dozen Ways to Kill a Man"
- The Sand Pebbles (1966) – Harris
- Chuka (1967) – Captain Robert R. Foster (uncredited)
- Cimarron Strip (1967)
  - - Marshal Tillman in S1:E2, "The Legend of Jud Starr"
- Run for Your Life (1967)
  - - General Andrew Douglas in S3:E6, "The Company of Scoundrels"
- The Invaders (1967)
  - - George Grundy in S1:E14, "Panic"
  - - General Jonathan Blaine in S2:E9, "Summit Meeting: Part 1"
- The Gypsy Moths (1969) – Stand Owner
- The Naked Zoo (1970) – Harry Golden
- The Traveling Executioner (1970) – Stanley Mae
- My Old Man's Place (1971) – Sheriff Coleman
- A Howling in the Woods (1971) - Bud Henshaw
- Alias Smith and Jones (1971)
  - - Warren Epps in S1:E3, "Exit from Wickenburg"
  - - Father in S1:E14, "Never Trust an Honest Man"
- Cannon (1971)
  - - Farmer in S1:E4, "Country Blues"
- Probe (1972) - Aaron Johannes (uncredited)
- Sixteen (1972) - Pa Irtley
- Alias Smith and Jones (1972)
  - - Deputy D.A. Collins in S2:E17, "The Man Who Broke the Bank at Red Gap"
  - - Collins in S2:E19, "The Biggest Game in the West"
  - - Teshmacker in S3:E5, "Bushwack!"
- Cotter (1973)
- Linda (1973) – Police Chief Vernon
- Key West (1973) – Prescott Webb
- Cannon (1973)
  - - Mr. Taylor in S3:E3, "Hounds of Hell"
- Barnaby Jones (1973)
  - - Andrew Mills in S2:E4, "Day of the Viper"
- Owen Marshall, Counselor at Law (1974)
  - - Captain in S3:E17, "A Killer with a Badge"
- The Stranger Who Looks Like Me (1974) - Mr. Gilbert
- The Story of Pretty Boy Floyd (1974) - Mr. Suggs
- The Parallax View (1974) – Commission Spokesman #2
- Cannon (1974)
  - - Raymond Wheelock in S4:E3, "Voice from the Grave"
- Gunsmoke (1974)
  - - Storekeeper in S20:E5, "Thirty a Month and Found"
- Strange New World (1975) - Sirus
- Petrocelli (1975)
  - - Hank in S2:E1, "Death Ride"
- The Six Million Dollar Man (1975)
  - - Jim Elgin in 3 episodes
- The Streets of San Francisco (1975)
  - - Haggard Mellon in S4:E8, "Trail of Terror"
- Little House on the Prairie (1975, 1978)
  - – Dr. Burke (S2:E2 & S4:E21)
- Sara (1976) - Jake Willis in S1:E9 "Child Bride"
- The Mary Tyler Moore Show (1976)
  - - Doctor in S7:E1, "Mary Midwife"
- Guardian of the Wilderness (1976) – Abraham Lincoln
- The Bionic Woman (1976-1977)
  - - Jim Elgin in 9 episodes
- Baa Baa Black Sheep (1977)
  - - General Muncie in S1:E13, "The War Biz Warrior"
- Most Wanted (1977)
  - - Dr. Farrell in S1:E12, "The Hit Man"
- Barnaby Jones (1977)
  - - Carmine Sandell in S6:E13, "Deadly Homecoming"
- Quincy, M.E. (1978)
  - - Dr. Bellamy in S3:E16, "Accomplice to Murder"
- A Family Upside Down (1978) - Mr. Case
- The Waltons (1978)
  - - Judge in S7:E3, "The Moonshiner"
- How the West Was Won (1979)
  - - Barrett in S3:E2, "The Rustler"
- Friendly Fire (1979) - Mr. Hamilton
- Strangers: The Story of a Mother and Daughter (1979) - Mr. Meecham
- Charlie's Angels (1979)
  - - Mr. Harkins in S4:E7, "Angels on the Street"
- B.J. and the Bear (1979)
  - - Emmett Lumm in S2:E9, "Gasohol"
- Gideon's Trumpet (1980) - Second Supreme Court Justice
- Halloween ΙΙ (1981) – Dr. Frederick Mixter
- Remington Steele (1984)
  - - Adam in S2:E17, "Small Town Steele"
- J. Edgar Hoover (1987) - Harlan Fiske Stone
- The Cellar (1989) – T.C. van Houten
- Matlock (1989)
  - - Judge Donald Powell in S3:E8, "The Mayor: Part 1"
  - - Judge Donald Powell in S3:E9, "The Mayor: Part 2"
- Moonlighting (1989)
  - - Judge in S5:E11, "In 'N Outlaws"
- Wiseguy (1989)
  - - Prescott Wilson in S3:E11, "Day Seven"
  - - Prescott Wilson in S3:E12, "Day Nine"
- Bed & Breakfast (1992) – Amos
- The Politics of Desire (1998) – Radio Listener's Husband
- Inferno (1999) – Pop Reynolds
- The King of Queens (1999–2003) – Mickey
- Purgatory Flats (2003) – Phil
