= History of the Yosemite area =

History of Yosemite National Park and the surrounding area

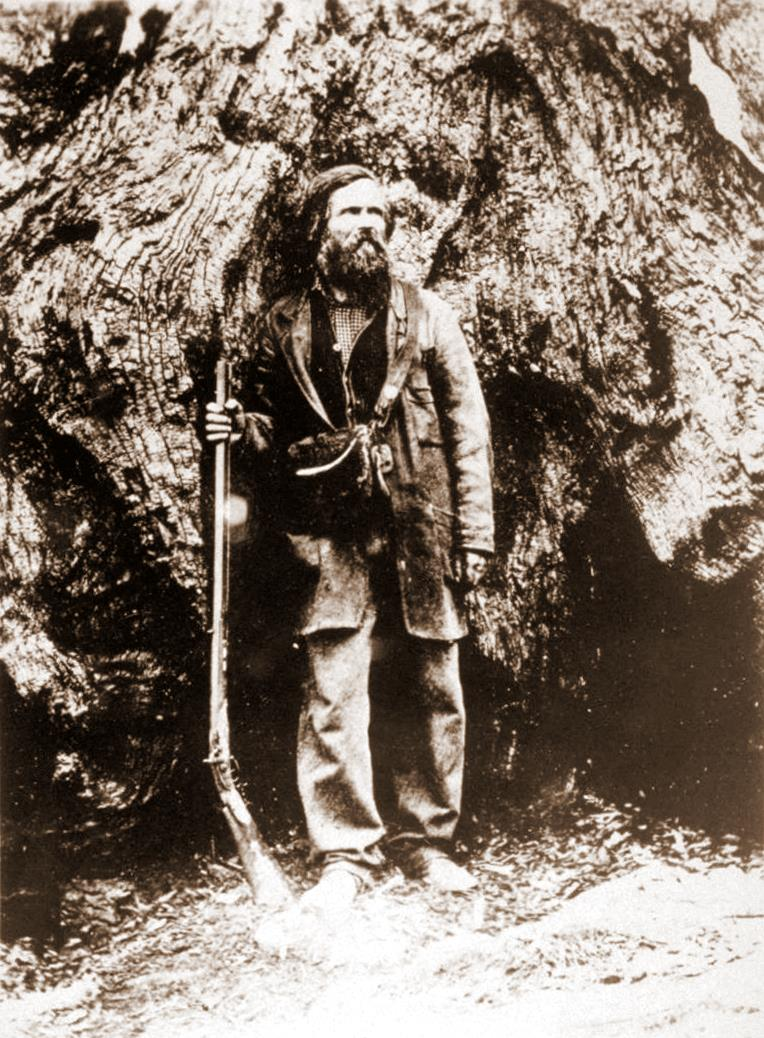
Galen Clark, the first California-state-appointed guardian of Yosemite Valley and the Mariposa Grove, pictured in front of the Grizzly Giant Tree, Mariposa Grove around 1858–9.

Human habitation in the Sierra Nevada region of California reaches back 8,000 to 10,000 years ago. Historically attested Native American populations, such as the Sierra Miwok, Mono and Paiute, belong to the Uto-Aztecan and Utian phyla. In the mid-19th century, a band of Native Americans called the Ahwahnechee lived in Yosemite Valley. The California Gold Rush greatly increased the number of non-indigenous people in the region. Tensions between Native Americans and white settlers escalated into the Mariposa War. As part of this conflict, settler James Savage led the Mariposa Battalion into Yosemite Valley in 1851, in pursuit of Ahwaneechees led by Chief Tenaya. The California state military forces burned the tribe's villages, destroyed their food stores, killed the chief's sons, and forced the tribe out of Yosemite. Accounts from the Mariposa Battalion, especially from Dr. Lafayette Bunnell, popularized Yosemite Valley as a scenic wonder.

In 1864, Yosemite Valley and the Mariposa Grove of giant sequoia trees were transferred from federal to state ownership. Yosemite pioneer Galen Clark became the park's first white guardian. Conditions in Yosemite Valley were made more hospitable to non-indigenous people, and access to the park was improved in the late 19th century. Indigenous people continued to be forced out periodically, while white settlers were paid a total of $60,000 to move out of the valley. Naturalist John Muir and others became increasingly alarmed about the excessive exploitation of the area. Their efforts helped establish Yosemite National Park in 1890. Yosemite Valley and the Mariposa Grove were added to the national park in 1906.

The United States Army had jurisdiction over the national park from 1891 to 1914, followed by a brief period of civilian stewardship. The newly formed National Park Service took over the park's administration in 1916. Improvements to the park helped to increase visitation during this time. Preservationists led by Muir and the Sierra Club failed to save Hetch Hetchy Valley from becoming a reservoir when the Raker Act was approved on December 2, 1913. This event was considered a major conservation battle lost, after which John Muir gave up on fighting and died on December 24, 1914. Construction on the O'Shaughnessey Dam began in 1919 and was completed in 1923. The loss of Hetch Hetchy led to the formation of the National Park Service through the approval of the Organic Act of 1916. In 1964, 89 percent of the park was set aside in a highly protected wilderness area, and other protected areas were added adjacent to the park.

== Early history ==
=== Native Americans ===
Humans may have lived in the Yosemite area as long as 8,000 to 10,000 years ago. Habitation of the Yosemite Valley proper can be traced to about 3,000 years ago, when vegetation and game in the region was similar to that present today; the western slopes of the Sierra Nevada had acorns, deer, and salmon, while the eastern Sierra had pinyon nuts and obsidian. Native American groups traveled between these two regions to trade and raid.

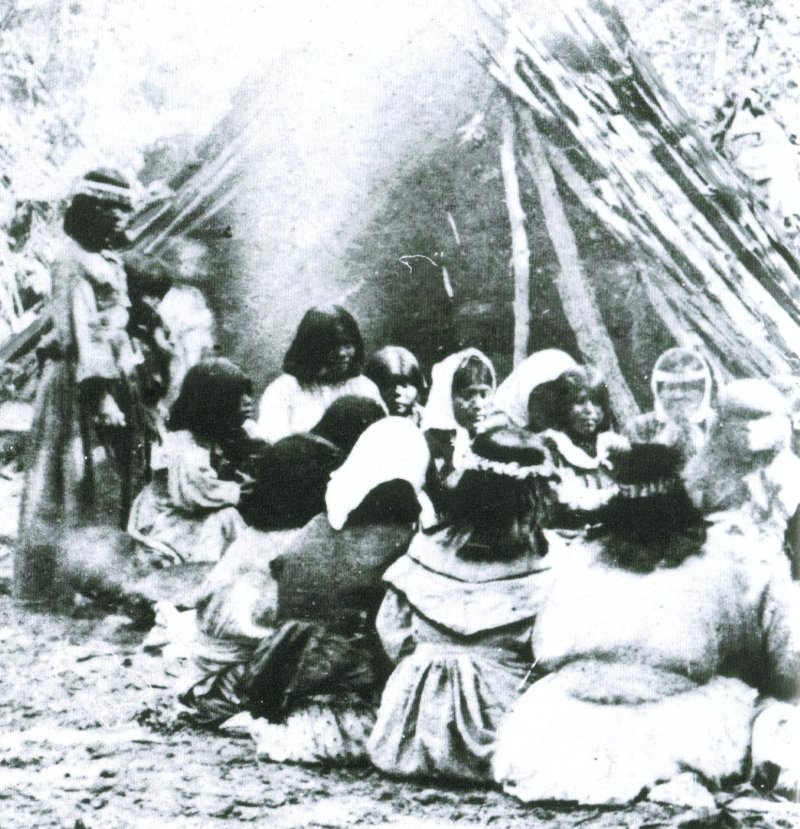
Yosemite Paiute ceremony in 1872, at the site of present-day Yosemite Lodge

Archaeologists divide the pre-European American contact period of the region into three cultural phases. The Crane Flat phase lasted from 1000 BCE to 500 CE and is marked by hunting with the atl atl and the use of grinding stones. The Tarmarack phase lasted from 500 until 1200, marked by a shift to using smaller rock points, indicating development and use of the bow and arrow. The Mariposa phase lasted from 1200 until contact with European Americans.

Trade between tribes became more widespread during the Mariposa phase, and the diet continued to improve. Paiutes, Miwok, and Monos visited the area to trade; one major trading route went over Mono Pass and through Bloody Canyon to Mono Lake in Eastern California.

Paiutes were the primary inhabitants of the Yosemite area and the foothills to the east during the Mariposa and historic phases. The Central Sierra Miwoks lived along the drainage area of the Tuolumne and Stanislaus Rivers, while the Paiutes inhabited the upper drainage of the Merced and Chowchilla Rivers.

The Paiutes of Yosemite Valley called themselves the Ah-wah-ne-chee, meaning "dwellers in Ahwahnee." The Ahwahneechees were decimated by a disease in about 1800, and left the valley, although about 200 returned under the leadership of Tenaya, son of an Ahwahneechee chief.

Displaced Native Americans from the Californian coast moved to the Sierra Nevada during the early-to-mid-19th century, bringing with them their knowledge of Spanish food, technology, and clothing. Joining forces with the other tribes in the area, they raided land grant ranchos on the coast and drove herds of horses to the Sierra, where horse meat became a major new food source.

=== Exploration by European Americans ===
Although there were Spanish missions, pueblos (towns), presidios (forts), and ranchos along the coast of California, no Spanish explorers visited the Sierra Nevada. The first European Americans to visit the mountains were amongst a group led by fur trapper Jedediah Smith, crossing north of the Yosemite area in May 1827, at Ebbetts Pass.

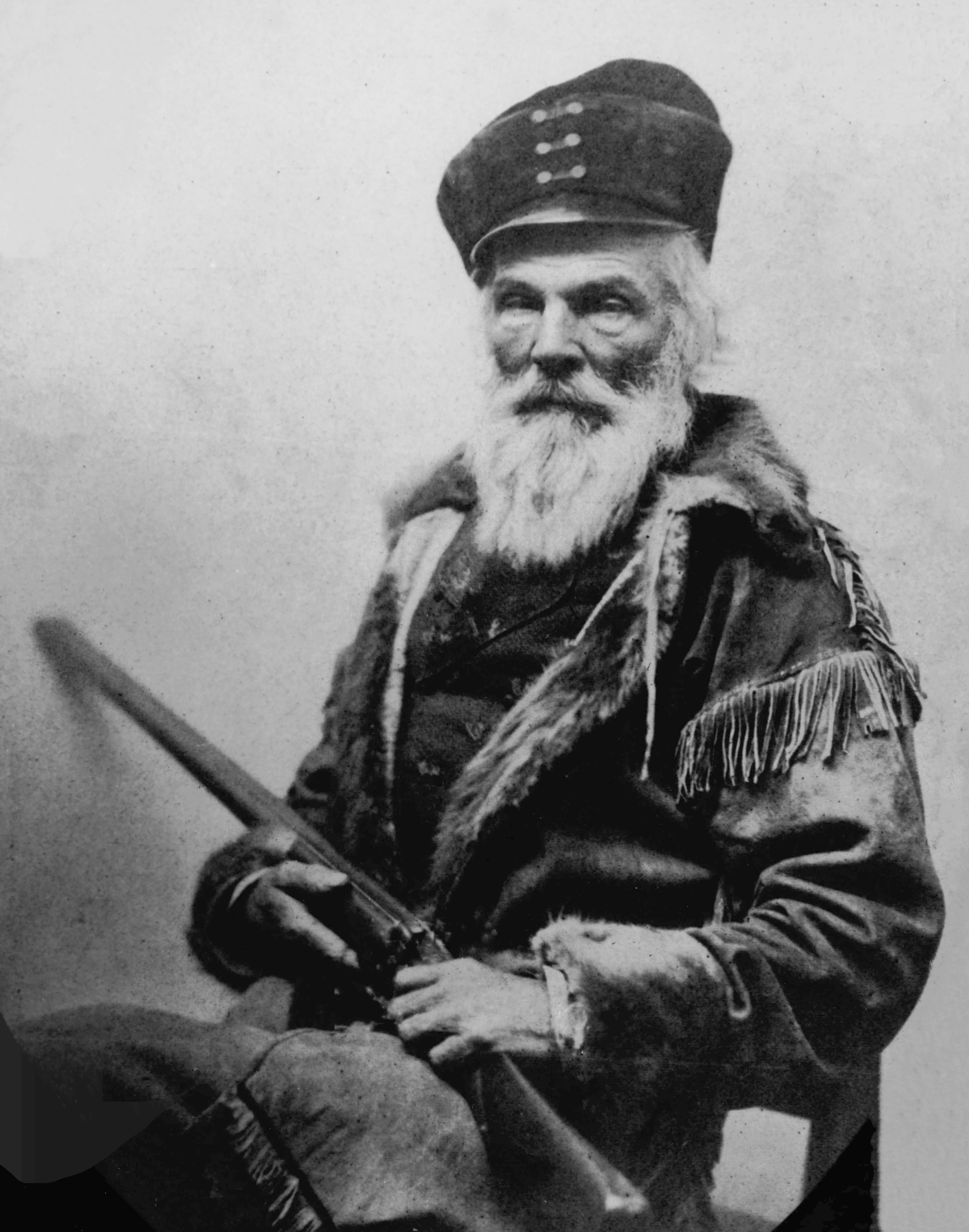
Joseph Walker, circa 1860. He may have been the first European American to see Yosemite Valley.

A group of trappers led by mountain man Joseph Reddeford Walker may have seen Yosemite Valley in the autumn of 1833. Walker approached a valley rim as he led his party across the Sierra Nevada, but he did not enter it. A member of the group, Zenas Leonard, wrote in his journal that streams from the valley rim dropped "from one lofty precipice to another, until they are exhausted in rain below. Some of these precipices appeared to us to be more than a mile high." The Walker party probably visited either the Tuolumne or Merced Groves of giant sequoia, becoming the first non-indigenous people to see the giant trees, but journals relating to the Walker party were destroyed in 1839, in a print shop fire in Philadelphia.

The part of the Sierra Nevada where the park is located was long considered to be a physical barrier to European American settlers, traders, trappers, and travelers. That situation changed in 1848 after gold was discovered in the foothills west of the range. Travel and trade activity dramatically increased in the area during the ensuing California Gold Rush. Resources depended upon by local Native Americans were depleted or destroyed, and disease brought by the newcomers spread rapidly through indigenous populations. Extermination of native culture became a policy of the United States Government.

The first confirmed sighting of Yosemite Valley by a non-indigenous person occurred on October 18, 1849, by William P. Abrams and a companion. Abrams accurately described some landmarks, but it is uncertain whether he or his companion actually entered the valley. In 1850, one of three brothers, Joseph, William, or Nathan Screech, became the first confirmed non-indigenous person to enter Hetch Hetchy Valley. Joseph Screech returned two years later and spoke with the Native Americans living there, asking them what the name of a grass-covered seed meal was and was told, "hatch hatchy."

The surveying crew of Allexey W. Von Schmidt conducted the first systematic traverse of any part of the Yosemite area backcountry in 1855, when it extended an approximation of the Mount Diablo Baseline eastward from a point west of the present park boundary, to a point south of Mono Lake. The actual route taken was 5 to 6 miles south of the actual baseline, due to topographic difficulties, including the Tuolumne River canyon at low elevations, and steep mountain slopes higher up. This was the first straight line survey made across the Sierra Nevada From 1879 to 1883 large parts of the western half of the park were surveyed as part of the General Land Office survey. The individual contracted for the largest area, one S. A. Hanson, was later listed among those associated with the Benson Syndicate, and he combined actual with probably fabricated surveys. Topographic surveys performed by Lieutenant Montgomery M. Macomb, under George M Wheeler's Surveys West of the 100th Meridian, were completed in the late 1870s and early 1880s.

=== Mariposa Wars ===
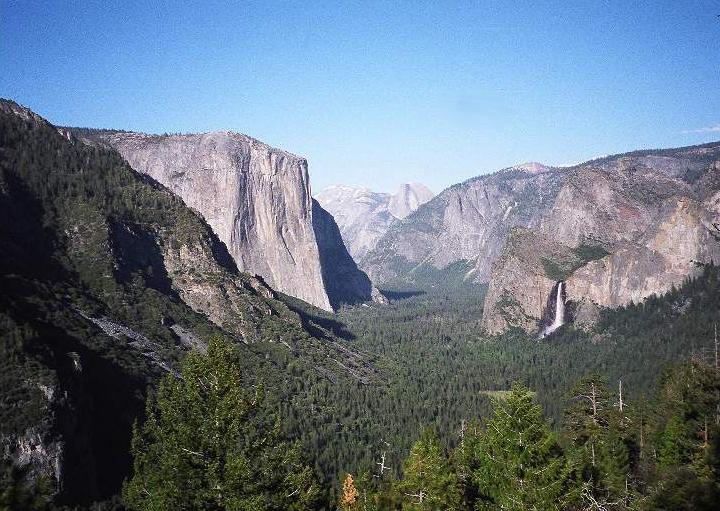
The Mariposa Battalion first viewed Yosemite Valley near Inspiration Point. Photo from 2003.

James Savage's trading camp on the Merced River, 10 miles (16 km) west of Yosemite Valley, was raided by Native Americans in December 1850, after which the raiders retreated into the mountains. The camp had been founded because the California Gold Rush had begun in 1849 bringing more than 40,000 gold seekers down the California Trail into northern and central California. This rapid influx of non-native settlers precipitated the California genocide of the indigenous peoples in the State. Before 1849, much of Northern and Central California had been populated by Native Americans and Californios (the descendants of early Spanish settlers). However by 1873, almost 80 percent of California's Native American population had been wiped out by conflict and disease, and their historic land seized by settlers from Mexico, South America, Europe, Australia, and China.

In response to miners forcing Native Americans off their historic lands in search for gold, Native Americans launched punitive raids against camps and settlements. Some tribes were pressed into service in mines; others had their villages raided by the army and volunteer militias. Some white settlers also thought it was time to get rid of Native Americans because they commanded too much labor in the mines. In retaliation for the attack on his camp, a month later in January 1851, Jim Savage led a militia in a punitive action against a native village, but after opening fire they were beaten back by indigenous firepower. Savage appealed to John McDougal, governor of California to raise a formation to sort the "Indian problem" out once and for all. The subsequent campaigns led by the Mariposa Battalion in 1851 became known as the Mariposa War.

Savage led the battalion into Yosemite Valley in 1851, in pursuit of around 200 Ahwaneechees led by Chief Tenaya. On March 27, 1851, the company of 50 to 60 men reached what is now called Old Inspiration Point, from where Yosemite Valley's main features are visible. Chief Tenaya and his band were eventually captured and their village burned, fulfilling the prophecy an old and dying medicine man had given Tenaya many years before. The Ahwahnechee were marched from their tribal lands under armed guards led by Captain John Bowling, to the Fresno River Reservation. With the fighting ended, the battalion was disbanded on July 1, 1851.

Life on the reservation was unpleasant and the Ahwahneechee longed to return to the Yosemite area. Reservation officials consented and allowed Tenaya and some of his band to return to their lands. However, in May 1852 a group of eight armed miners entered Yosemite Valley and were allegedly attacked by Tenaya's warriors; two of the miners were killed. In retaliation regular army troops under the direction of Lt. Tredwell Moore shot dead six Ahwahneechee who were in possession of European clothing.

Tenaya's band fled the valley and sought refuge with the Mono people, his mother's tribe. A year later, in mid-1853, the Ahwahneechee returned to the valley but they betrayed the hospitality of their former Mono hosts by stealing horses that the Mono had taken from non-indigenous ranchers. In return, the Monos tracked down and killed many of the remaining Ahwahneechee, including Tenaya (Tenaya Lake is named after the fallen chief). Inter-tribal hostilities eventually subsided and by the mid-1850s local European American residents started to befriend Native Americans still living in the Yosemite area.

=== Naming the area ===
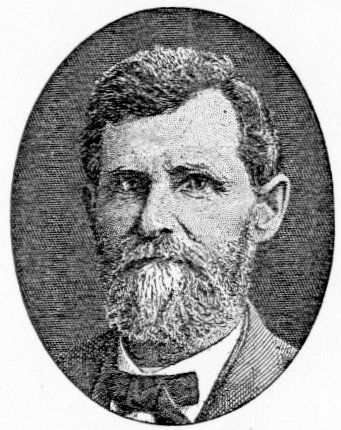
Dr. Lafayette Bunnell named many of the features in the area of the park, including Yosemite Valley. Photo from his 1880 book, Discovery of the Yosemite, and the Indian War of 1851, which led to that event

During the military campaigns of the Mariposa War, members of the Mariposa Battalion had proposed names for the valley while they were camped at Bridalveil Meadow. The company physician who had been attached to Savage's unit, Dr. Lafayette Bunnell, suggested "Yo-sem-i-ty". It was the name that the surrounding Sierra Miwok peoples used, as they feared the tribes in the Yosemite Valley. Savage, who spoke some native dialects, translated this as "full-grown grizzly bear." The term, which was possibly derived from or confused with the similar uzumati or uhumati, meaning "grizzly bear," is the Southern Sierra Miwok word Yohhe'meti, meaning "they are killers." Bunnell named many other local topographic features on the same trip.

Bunnell drafted an article about the trip, but destroyed it when a newspaper correspondent in San Francisco suggested cutting his 1,500- foot (460 m) height estimate for the valley's walls in half; the walls are in fact twice the height that Bunnell surmised. The first published account of Yosemite Valley was written by Lt. Tredwell Moore for the January 20, 1854, issue of the Mariposa Chronicle, establishing the modern spelling of Yosemite. Bunnell described his awestruck impressions of the valley in his book, The Discovery of the Yosemite, published in 1892.

=== Artists, photographers, and the first tourists ===
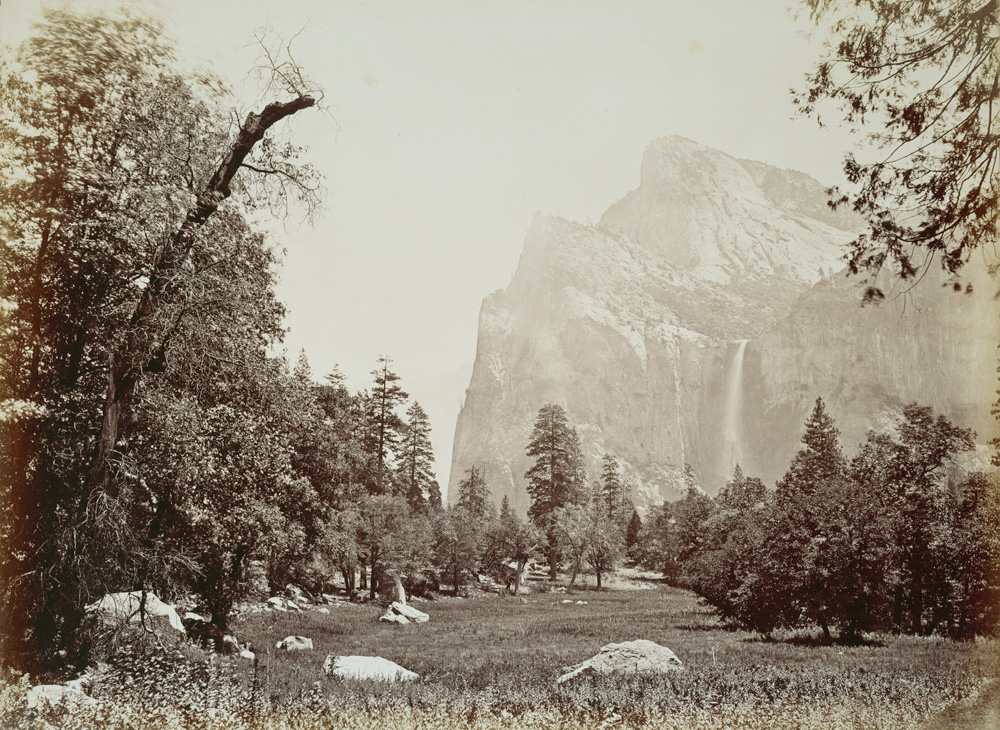
Bridal veil fall photographed by Carleton E. Watkins

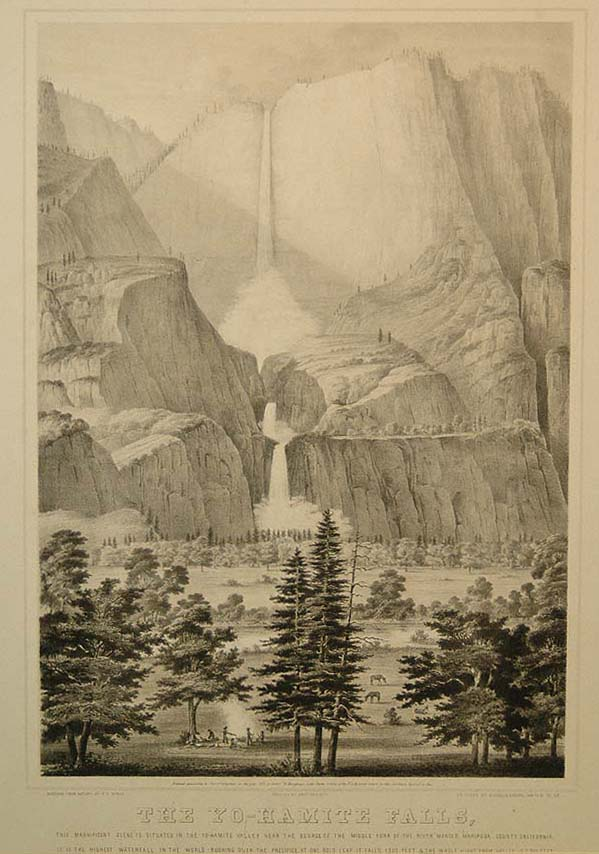
Yosemite Falls, lithograph appearing in Hutchings' magazine, from a sketch by Thomas Ayres

Forty-eight Non-Indian people visited Yosemite Valley in 1855, including San Francisco writer James Mason Hutchings and artist Thomas Ayres. Hutchings wrote an article about his experience that was published in the July 12, 1855, issue of the Mariposa Gazette and Ayres' sketch of Yosemite Falls was published in late 1855; four of his drawings were presented in the lead article of the July 1856 and initial issue of Hutchings' Illustrated California Magazine. The article and illustrations created tourist interest in Yosemite and eventually led to its protection.

Ayres returned in 1856 and visited Tuolumne Meadows in the area's high country. His highly detailed angularly exaggerated artwork and his written accounts were distributed nationally and an art exhibition of his drawings was held in New York City.

Hutchings took photographer Charles Leander Weed to Yosemite Valley in 1859; Weed took the first photographs of the valley's features, which were presented to the public in a September exhibition held in San Francisco. Hutchings published four installments of "The Great Yo-semite Valley" from October 1859 to March 1860 in his magazine and re-published a collection of these articles in his Scenes of Wonder and Curiosity in California, which remained in print into the 1870s.

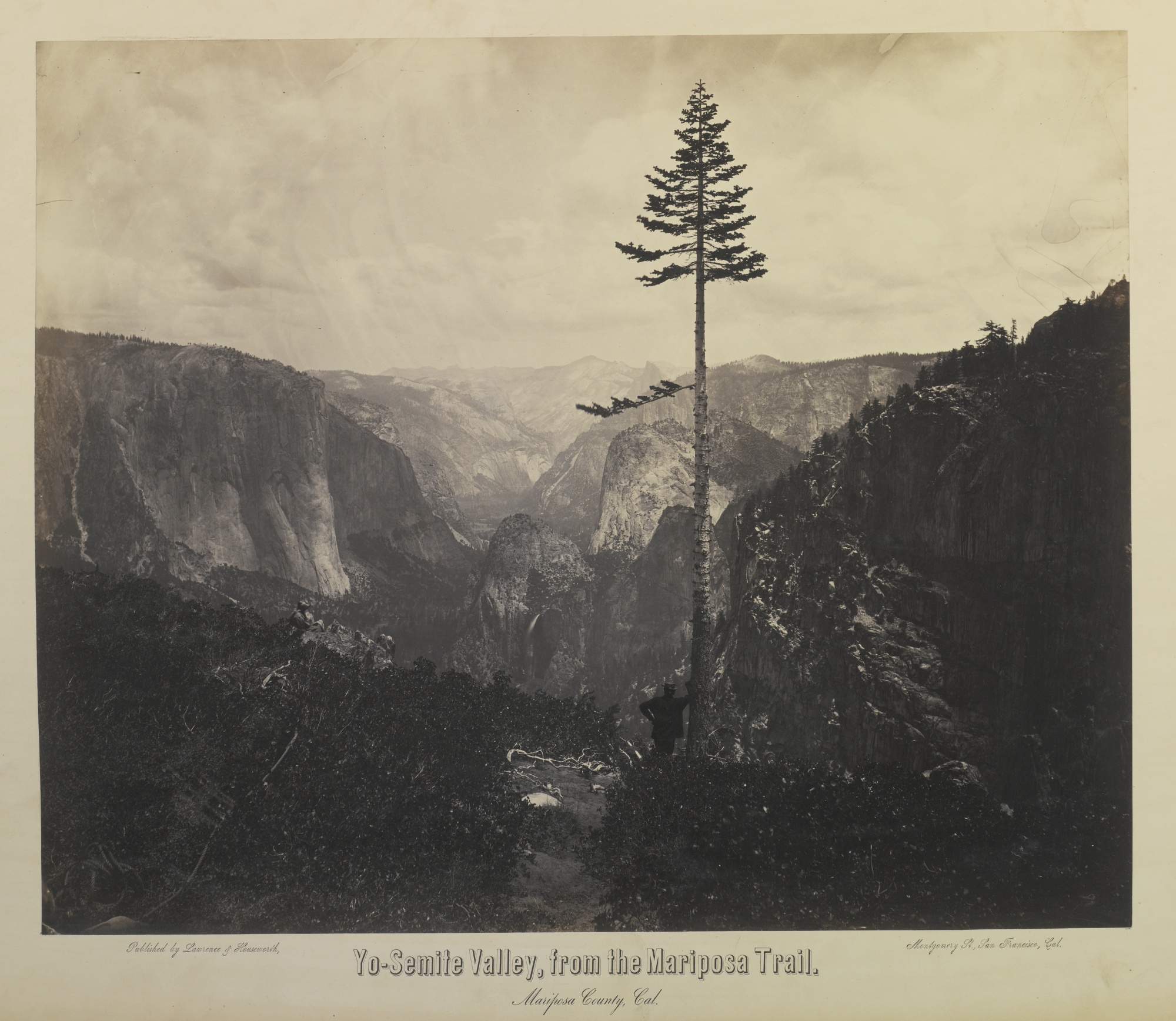
1864 photo of Yosemite Valley, by Charles Leander Weed.

Carleton Watkins exhibited his 17 by 22 in (43 by 56 cm) Yosemite views at the 1867 Paris International Exposition.

Photographer Ansel Adams made his first trip to Yosemite in 1916; his photographs of the valley made him famous in the 1920s and 1930s. Adams willed the originals of his Yosemite photos to the Yosemite Park Association, and visitors can still buy direct prints from his original negatives. The studio in which the prints are sold was established in 1902 by artist Harry Cassie Best.

Milton and Houston Mann opened a toll road to Yosemite Valley in 1856, up the South Fork of the Merced River. They charged the then considerable sum of two dollars per person until the road was bought by Mariposa County, after which it became free.

In 1856, settler Galen Clark discovered the Mariposa Grove of giant sequoia at Wawona, an indigenous encampment in what is now the southwestern part of the park. Clark completed a bridge over the South Fork of the Merced River in 1857 at Wawona for traffic headed toward Yosemite Valley and provided a way station for travelers on the road the Mann brothers built to the valley.

Simple lodgings, later called the Lower Hotel, were completed soon afterward; the Upper Hotel, later renamed Hutchings House and eventually known as Cedar Cottage, was opened in 1859. In 1876, the more substantial Wawona Hotel was built to serve tourists visiting the nearby grove of big trees and those on their way to Yosemite Valley. Aaron Harris opened the first campground business in Yosemite in 1876.

== State grant ==
=== Forming the state grant ===
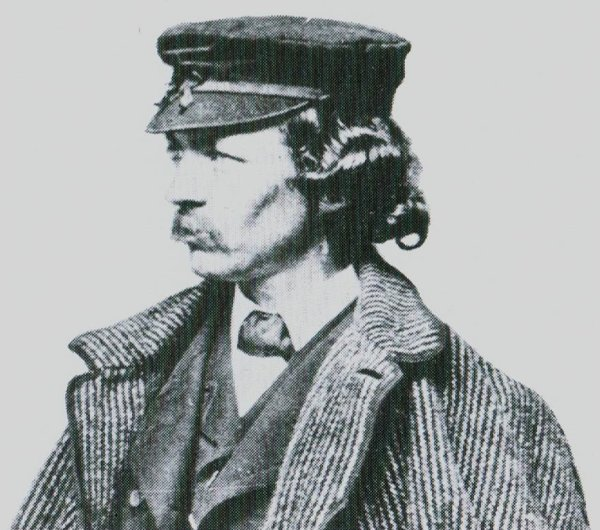
Architect Frederick Law Olmsted, was appointed chairmen of the Yosemite Commission. Photo circa 1860.

Visitation and interest in Yosemite continued to grow through the American Civil War. Unitarian minister Thomas Starr King visited the valley in 1860 and saw some of the negative effects that settlement and commercial activity were having on the area. Six travel letters by Starr King were published in the Boston Evening Transcript in 1860 and 1861; Starr King became the first person with a nationally recognized voice to call for a public park at Yosemite. Oliver Wendell Holmes and John Greenleaf Whittier read and commented on Starr King's letters and landscape architect Frederick Law Olmsted was prompted by the warnings to visit the Yosemite area in 1863.

Pressure from Starr King and Olmsted, photographs by Carleton Watkins, and geological data from the 1863 Geological Survey of California prompted legislators to take action. Senator John Conness of California introduced a park bill in 1864 to the United States Senate to cede Yosemite Valley and the Mariposa Grove of Big Trees to California.

The bill easily passed both houses of the United States Congress, and was signed by President Abraham Lincoln on June 30, 1864. The Yosemite Grant, as it was called, was given to California as a state park for "public use, resort and recreation". A board of commissioners, with Frederick Law Olmsted as chairman, was formed in September 1864 to govern the grant, but it did not meet until 1866.

=== Managing the state grant ===
The commission appointed Galen Clark as the grant's first guardian, but neither Clark nor the commissioners had the authority to evict homesteaders. Josiah Whitney, the first director of the California Geological Survey, lamented that Yosemite Valley would meet the same fate as Niagara Falls, which at that time was a tourist trap with tolls on every bridge, path, trail, and viewpoint.

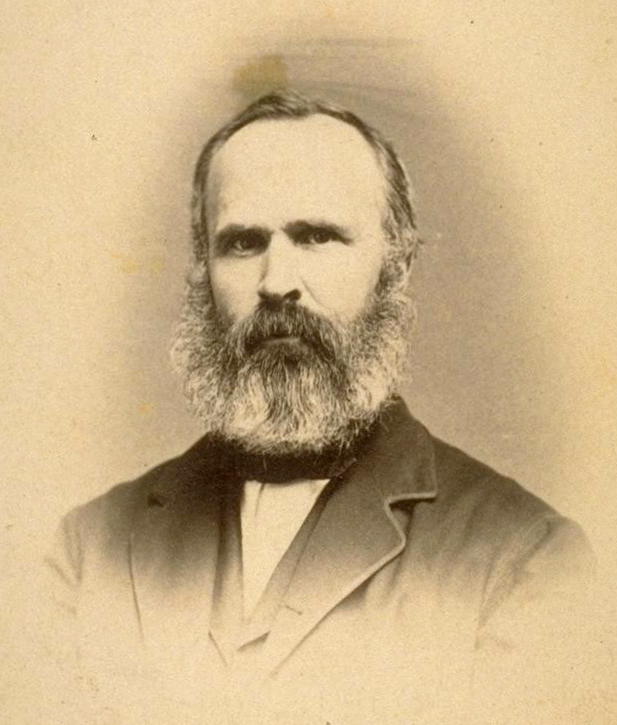
Noted geologist Josiah Whitney, 1863. He feared that Yosemite would meet the same fate as Niagara Falls.

Hutchings and a small group of settlers sought legal homesteading rights on 160 acres (65 ha) of the valley floor. The issue was not settled until 1874 when the land holdings of Hutchings and three others were invalidated and the state legislature appropriated $60,000 ($1,710,000 as of 2025) to compensate the settlers, of which Hutchings received $20,000.

Conditions in Yosemite Valley and access to the park steadily improved. In 1878, Clark used dynamite to breach a recessional moraine in the valley to drain a swamp behind it. Tourism significantly increased after a Sacramento to Stockton extension of the First transcontinental railroad was completed in 1869 and the Central Pacific Railroad reached Merced in 1872.

The long horseback ride from Merced remained a deterrent to tourists. Three stagecoach roads were built in the mid-1870s to provide better access; Coulterville Road (June 1874), Big Oak Flat Road (July 1874), and the Wawona Road (July 1875). A road to Glacier Point was completed in 1882 by John Conway, and the Great Sierra Wagon Road was opened in 1883, which roughly followed the Mono Trail to Tuolumne Meadows.

Clark and the sitting commissioners were removed from office by the California Legislature in 1880, and Hutchings became the new guardian. Hutchings in turn was replaced as guardian, in 1884, by W. E. Dennison. Clark was reappointed as guardian in 1889 and retired in 1896.

In 1900, Oliver Lippincott became the first to drive an automobile into Yosemite Valley. Yosemite Valley Railroad, nicknamed "the short line to paradise," arrived at nearby El Portal, California in 1907. Numerous hiking and horse trails were cleared, including a walking path through Mariposa Grove.

=== Concessionaires ===
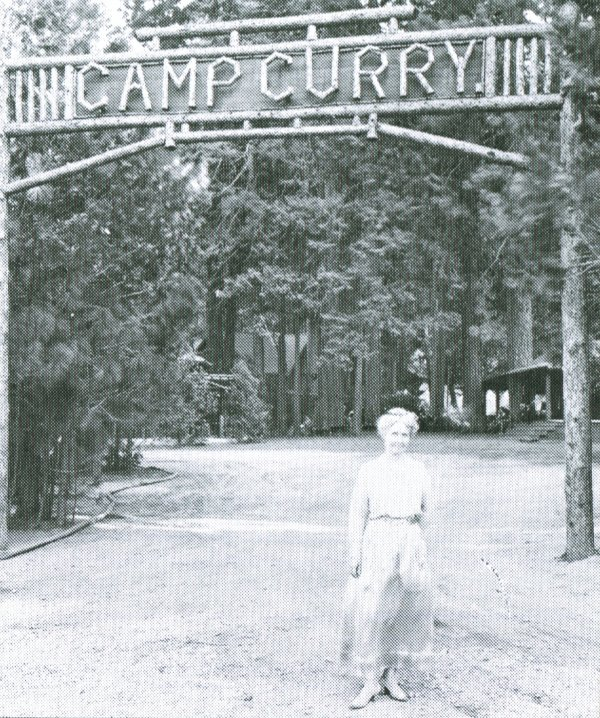
Mother Curry in front of Camp Curry, circa 1900

Yosemite's first concession was established in 1884 when Mr. and Mrs. John Degnan established a bakery and store. The Desmond Park Service Company was granted a twenty-year concession in 1916; the company bought out or built hotels, stores, camps, a dairy, a garage, and other park services. Desmond changed its name to the Yosemite National Park Company in December 1917 and was reorganized in 1920.

The Curry Company was started by David and Jenny Curry in 1899; the couple also founded Camp Curry, now known as Curry Village. The Currys lobbied reluctant park supervisors to allow expansion of concessionaire operations and development in the area.

Administrators in the National Park Service felt that limiting the number of concessionaires in each national park would be more financially sound. The Curry Company and its rival, the Yosemite National Park Company, were forced to merge in 1925 to form the Yosemite Park & Curry Company (YP&CC).

== National park ==
=== John Muir's influence ===
Immediately following his arrival in California in March 1868, naturalist John Muir set out for the Yosemite area, where he found work tending to the sheep owned by a local rancher, Pat Delaney. Muir's employment provided him with the opportunity to study the area's plants, rocks, and animals; the articles and scientific papers he wrote describing his observations helped to popularize the area and to increase scientific interest in it. Muir was one of the first to suggest that Yosemite Valley's major landforms were created by large alpine glaciers, contradicting the view of established scientists such as Josiah Whitney, who proposed that the Valley is a graben (a downdropped block of land), and regarded Muir as an amateur.

Alarmed by over grazing of meadows, logging of giant sequoia, and other damage, Muir changed from being a promoter and scientist to an advocate for further protection. He persuaded many influential people to camp with him in the area, such as Ralph Waldo Emerson in 1871. Muir tried to convince his guests that the entire area should be under federal protection. None of his guests through the 1880s could do much for Muir's cause, except for Robert Underwood Johnson, editor of Century Magazine. Through Johnson, Muir had a national audience for his writing and a highly motivated and crafty congressional lobbyist.

Muir's wish was partially granted on October 1, 1890, when the area outside the valley and sequoia grove became a national park under the unopposed Yosemite Act. The Act provided "for the preservation from injury of all timber, mineral deposits, natural curiosities, or wonders within said reservation, and their retention in their natural condition" and prohibited "wanton destruction of the fish and game and their capture or destruction for the purposes of merchandise or profit."

Yosemite National Park included the entire upper drainages of two river watersheds. Preservation of watersheds was very important to Muir, who said "you cannot save Yosemite Valley without saving its Sierran fountains." The State of California retained control of Yosemite Valley and the Mariposa Grove of Big Trees. Muir and 181 others founded the Sierra Club in 1892, in part to lobby for the transfer of the valley and the grove into the national park.

=== Army administration ===
Like Yellowstone National Park before it, Yosemite National Park was at first administered by various units of the United States Army. Captain Abram Wood led the 4th Cavalry Regiment into the new park on May 19, 1891, and set up Camp A.E. Wood (now the Wawona Campground) in Wawona. Each summer, 150 cavalrymen traveled from the Presidio of San Francisco to patrol the park. Approximately 100,000 sheep were illegally led into Yosemite's high meadows each year. The Army lacked legal authority to arrest the herders, but instead escorted them on a several days' hike from their flock, which left the sheep vulnerable. By the late 1890s sheep grazing was no longer a problem, but at least one herder continued to graze his sheep in the park into the 1920s. In 1904, Acting Superintendent Major John Bigelow and members of the 9th Cavalry Regiment created an arboretum in Wawona. It was discontinued the following year when the location was found to be outside the park boundary. This first attempt at interpreting the park came 16 years before Harold C. Bryant established Yosemite's naturalist program.

The Army also tried to control poaching. In 1896, acting Superintendent Colonel S. B. M. Young stopped issuing firearm permits after discovering that large numbers of game and fish were being killed. Poaching continues to be an issue in the 21st century. The Army's administration of the park ended in 1914.

Galen Clark retired as the state grant's guardian in 1896, leaving Yosemite Valley and the Mariposa Grove of Big Trees under ineffective stewardship. Pre-existing problems in the state grant worsened and new problems arose, but the cavalry could only monitor the situation. Muir and the Sierra Club continued to lobby the government and influential people for the creation of a unified Yosemite National Park. The Sierra Club began to organize annual trips to Yosemite in 1901 in an effort to make the remote area more accessible.

=== Unified national park ===
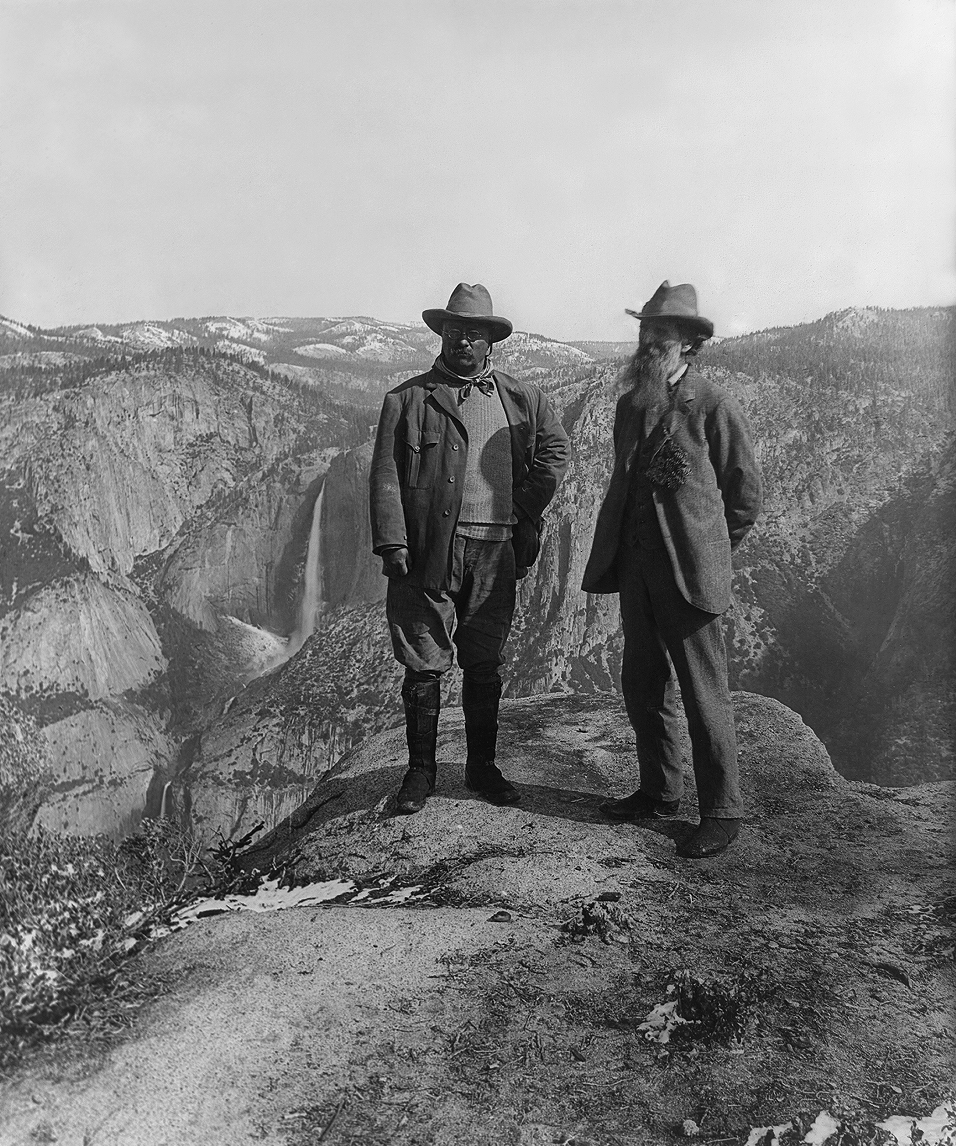
Theodore Roosevelt and John Muir at Glacier Point in 1903

U.S. President Theodore Roosevelt camped with John Muir near Glacier Point for three days in May 1903. During that trip, Muir convinced Roosevelt to take control of the valley and the grove away from California and give it to the federal government. On June 11, 1906, Roosevelt signed a bill that did precisely that, and the superintendent's headquarters was moved from Wawona to Yosemite Valley.

To secure congressional and State of California approval for the plan, the size of the park was reduced by more than 500 square miles (1,300 km^{2}), which excluded natural wonders such as the Devils Postpile and prime wildlife habitat. The park was again reduced in size in 1906, when logging began in an area around Wawona. Acting superintendent Major H. C. Benson said in 1908 that "game is on the decrease. Each reduction of the park has cut another portion of the winter resort of game." The various changes meant that the park was reduced to two-thirds of its original size.

About 12,000 acres (4,900 ha) between the Tuolumne and the Merced big tree groves were added to the park in 1930 through land purchases by the federal government and matching funds provided by industrialist John D. Rockefeller. Another 8,765 acres (3,547 ha) near Wawona were added in 1932. The Carl Inn Tract, close to the Rockefeller purchase, was secured in 1937 and 1939.

=== Fight over Hetch Hetchy Valley ===
San Francisco Mayor James D. Phelan hired USGS engineer Joseph P. Lippincott in 1900 to perform a discreet survey of Hetch Hetchy Valley, located north of Yosemite Valley in the national park. His report stated that a dam of the Tuolumne River in the Hetch Hetchy Valley was the best choice to create a drinking water reservoir for the city. Lippincott sought water rights to the Tuolumne River and rights to build reservoirs at Hetch Hetchy and Lake Eleanor on behalf of Phelan in 1901. These requests were rejected in 1903 by Secretary of the Interior Ethan Allen Hitchcock, who felt the application was "not in keeping with the public interest."

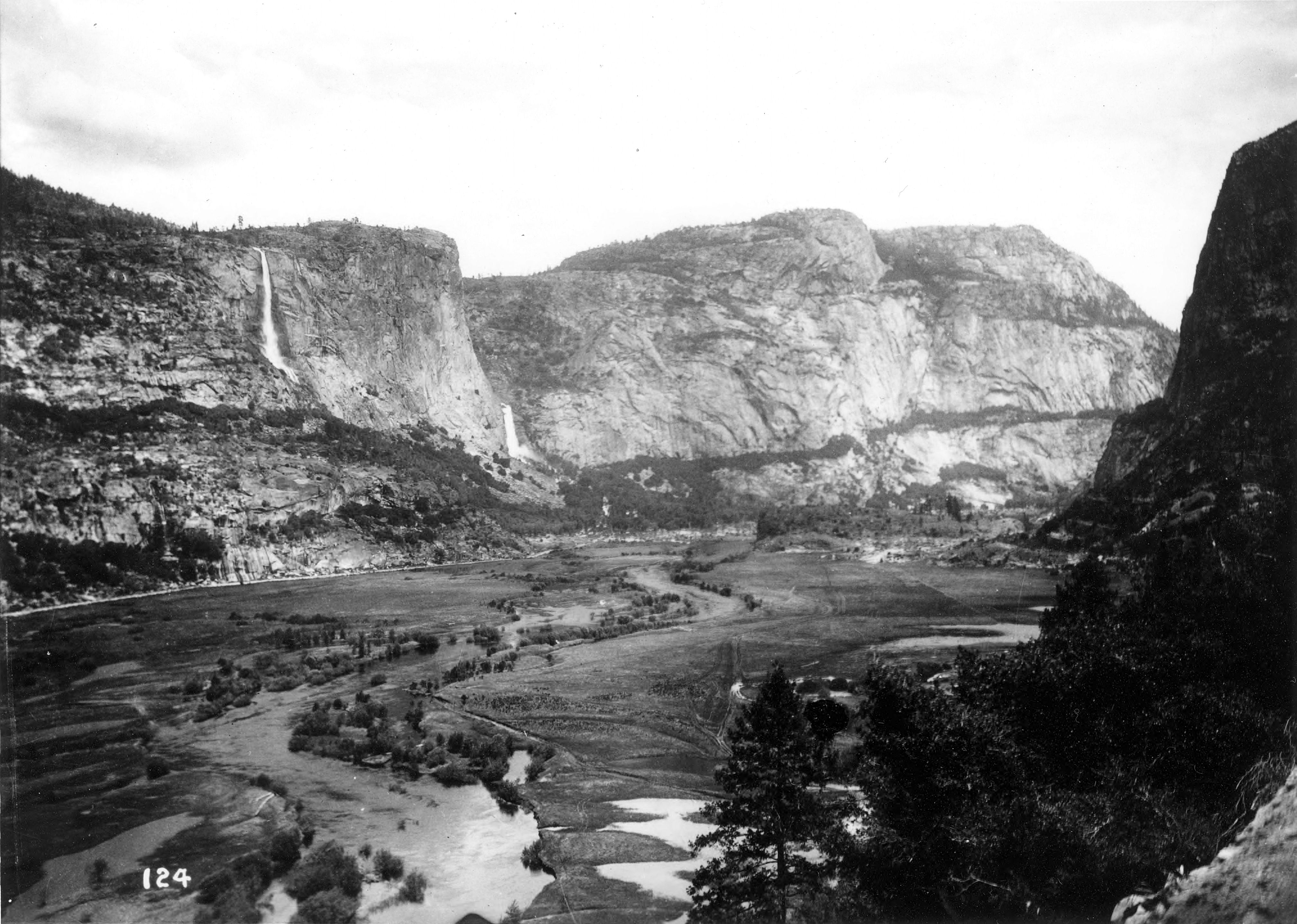
Hetch Hetchy Valley before it was dammed. This photograph by Isaiah West Taber appeared in the Sierra Club Bulletin in 1908.

The 1906 San Francisco earthquake tipped the balance in favor of granting the city the right to build the dam. Rights to Hetch Hetchy were granted to the City of San Francisco in 1908 by Secretary of the Interior James Rudolph Garfield, who wrote: "Domestic use is the highest use to which water and available storage basins ... can be put."

A nationally publicized fight over the dam project ensued; preservationists like Muir wanted to leave wild areas wild, and conservationists like Gifford Pinchot wanted to manage wild areas for the betterment of mankind. Robert Underwood Johnson and the Sierra Club joined the fight to save the valley from flooding. Muir wrote, "Dam Hetch Hetchy! As well dam for watertanks the people's cathedrals and churches, for no holier temple has ever been consecrated by the heart of man." Pinchot, who was director of the U.S. Forest Service, wrote to his close friend Roosevelt that "the highest possible use which could be made of it would be to supply pure water to a great center of population."

Roosevelt's successor, Woodrow Wilson, signed the Raker Act into law on December 13, 1913, which authorized construction of the dam. Hetch Hetchy Reservoir grew as the valley was flooded behind the O'Shaughnessy Dam in 1923. The Raker Act also gave the city the right to store water in Lake Eleanor and Cherry Lake, both located northwest of Hetch Hetchy in the park.

Shortly before Muir died he expressed the hope that "some compensating good must follow" from the Raker Act. The fight over the dam strengthened the conservation movement by popularizing it nationally.

=== National Park Service ===
The administration of Yosemite National Park was transferred to the newly formed National Park Service in 1916, when W. B. Lewis was appointed as the park's superintendent. Parsons Memorial Lodge and Tioga Pass Road, along with campgrounds at Tenaya and Merced lakes, were completed the same year; six hundred automobiles entered the east side of the park using Tioga Road that summer. The "All-Weather Highway" (now State Route 140) opened in 1926, ensuring year-long visitation and delivery of supplies under normal conditions. Completion of the 0.8-mile (1.3 km)-long Wawona Tunnel in 1933 significantly reduced travel time to Yosemite Valley from Wawona. The famous Tunnel View is on the valley side of the tunnel and Old Inspiration Point is above it. A flood, reduced lumber and mining extraction, and greatly increased automobile and bus use forced the Yosemite Valley Railway out of business in 1945. The present day Tioga Road, now part of California State Route 120, was dedicated in 1961.

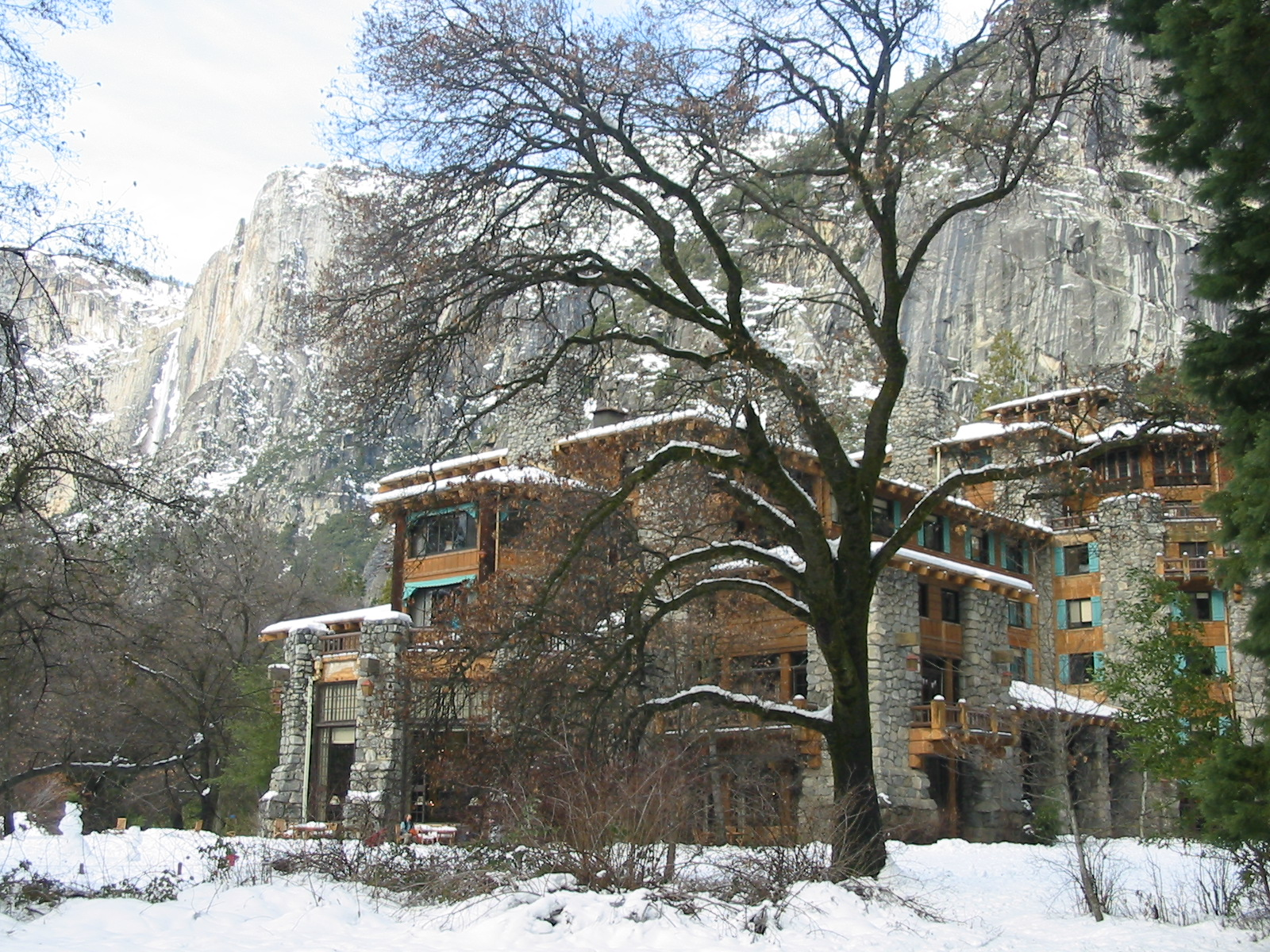
The Ahwahnee Hotel, 2006

Interpretive programs and services for national parks were pioneered in Yosemite by Harold C. Bryant and Loye Holmes Miller in 1920. Ansel F. Hall became the first park naturalist in 1921 and served in that role for two years. Hall's idea to have park museums act as public contact centers for interpretive programs became a model followed by other national parks in the United States and internationally. Yosemite Museum, the first permanent museum in the National Park System, was completed in 1926.

The Ahwahnee Hotel, in Yosemite Valley, is a National Historic Landmark. Built in 1927, it is a luxury hotel designed by the architect Gilbert Stanley Underwood, decorated in Native American motifs. For many years it hosted an annual pageant produced by Ansel Adams. During World War II it was used as a rehabilitation hospital for soldiers.

=== Restoration and preservation ===
Large floods covered Yosemite Valley in 1937, 1950, 1955, and 1997. These floods had a flow rate of 22,000 to 25,000 cubic feet (620 to 700 m^{3}) per second, as measured at the Pohono Bridge gauging station in Yosemite Valley.

All the structures in Old Yosemite Village, except for the chapel, were either moved to the Pioneer Yosemite History center in Wawona or demolished during the 1950s and 1960s. Other structures in the park were also moved to the history center. Cedar Cottage, the oldest building in Yosemite Valley, was demolished in 1941 along with others, even though they had not been flooded. Little regard was given to historic preservation, as the priority was thought to be the preservation and restoration of natural scenery.

Congress set aside about 89 percent of the park in a highly protected wilderness area through passage of the Wilderness Act of 1964. No roads, motorized vehicles (except rescue helicopters and other emergency vehicles), or any development beyond trail maintenance are allowed in this area. The adjacent Ansel Adams Wilderness and John Muir Wilderness were also protected under the act and include regions removed from the park immediately before it was unified with the state grant in 1906.

The Yosemite Firefall, in which the embers from a bonfire were pushed off a cliff near Glacier Point to create a spectacular effect, was occasionally performed in the 1870s and became a nightly tradition with the founding of Camp Curry. It was ended in 1968 because it was deemed to be inconsistent with park values.

=== Since the late 1960s ===
Broader tensions in American society surfaced in Yosemite when a large number of youths gathered in the park over the summer of 1970, triggering a riot on July 4 after rangers tried to evict bikers from camping illegally in Stoneman Meadow.

The Yosemite Park and Curry Company was bought by Music Corporation of America (MCA) in 1973. In 1988, concessionaires brought in $500 million ($1.36 billion as of 2025), and paid the federal government $12.5 million ($34 million as of 2025) for the franchise. Delaware North Companies became the primary concessionaire for Yosemite in 1992. The 15-year agreement with the National Park Service increased yearly park revenue from concessionaires to $20 million ($45.9 million as of 2025). The current concessionaire is Aramark.

In 1999, four women were killed by Cary Stayner just outside the park. That same year a large rockslide originating at the east side of Glacier Point ended near the Happy Isles of the Merced River, creating a debris field larger than several football fields. Tourism dropped a little after those incidents, but soon returned to its previous level.

=== 21st century ===
In August 2013, the Rim Fire burned approximately 77,254 acres within the park — the largest fire in Yosemite history at the time and, at its extent of over 255,000 total acres, the largest forest fire in California history up to that point. The fire began on the adjacent Stanislaus National Forest and was fueled partly by decades of fire suppression that had accumulated heavy fuel loads on the forest floor.

In July 2022, the Washburn Fire ignited near the park's Mariposa Grove, threatening hundreds of giant sequoias including the Grizzly Giant. Previous prescribed burns in the grove reduced fuel loads and slowed the fire's advance, protecting the trees from serious damage. The grove reopened on August 3, 2022, and park managers cited the outcome as evidence of the long-term benefit of controlled burning programs.

Beginning in early 2025, reductions to the federal workforce resulted in a 24 percent decline in permanent National Park Service positions nationwide. At Yosemite and other parks, the cuts led to reduced visitor center hours, delayed maintenance, and fewer ranger-led programs, even as visitation reached near-record levels.

== Transportation ==
=== The Stagecoach Era ===
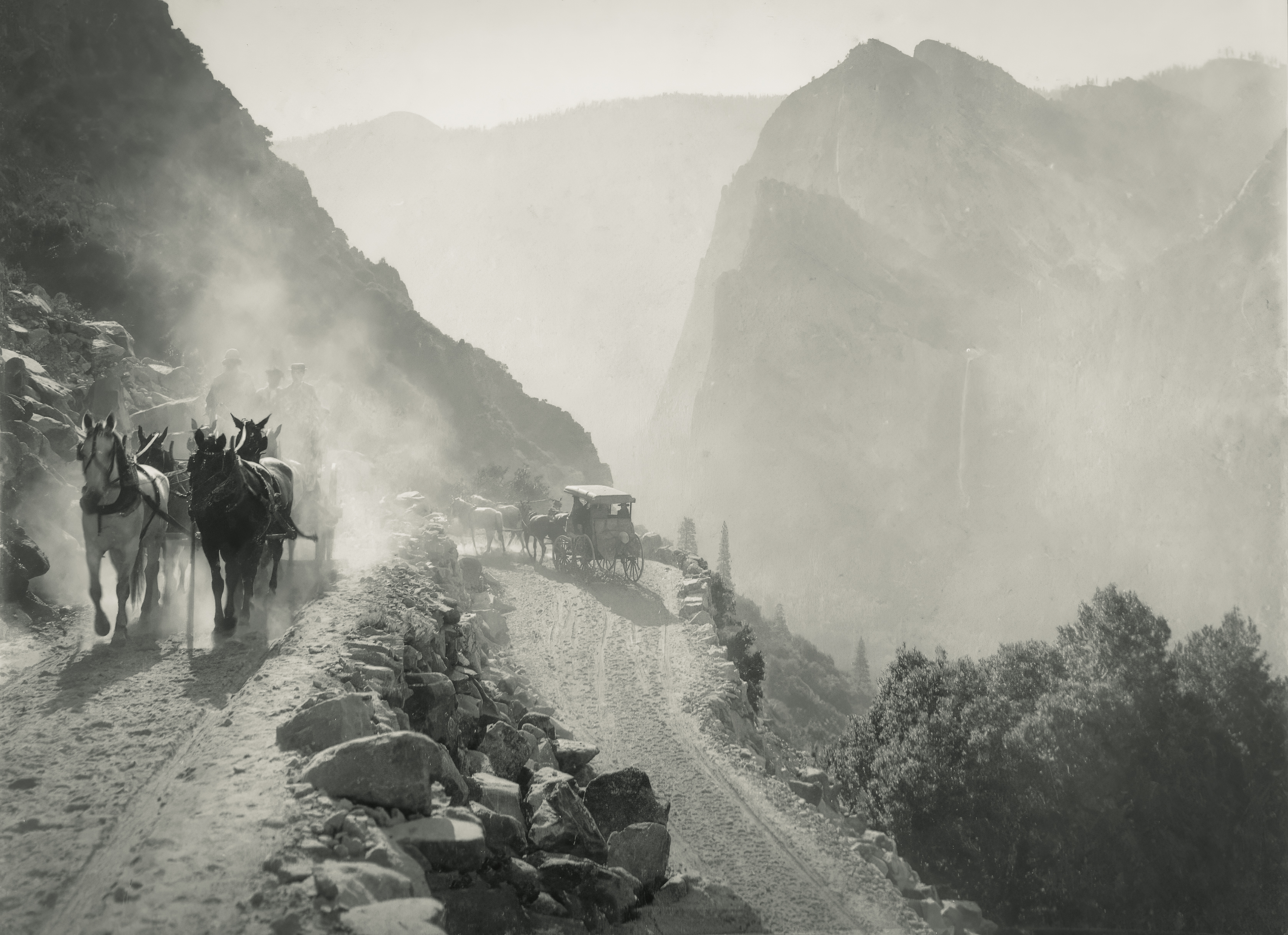
Wagons on Big Oak Flat Road's switchbacks over Yosemite Valley.

For the initial twenty-three years following Savage's arrival in Yosemite, rugged horse trails served as the solitary access points to Yosemite Valley. These routes, carved into the mountainous terrain, were traversed by an estimated twelve thousand adventurous visitors.

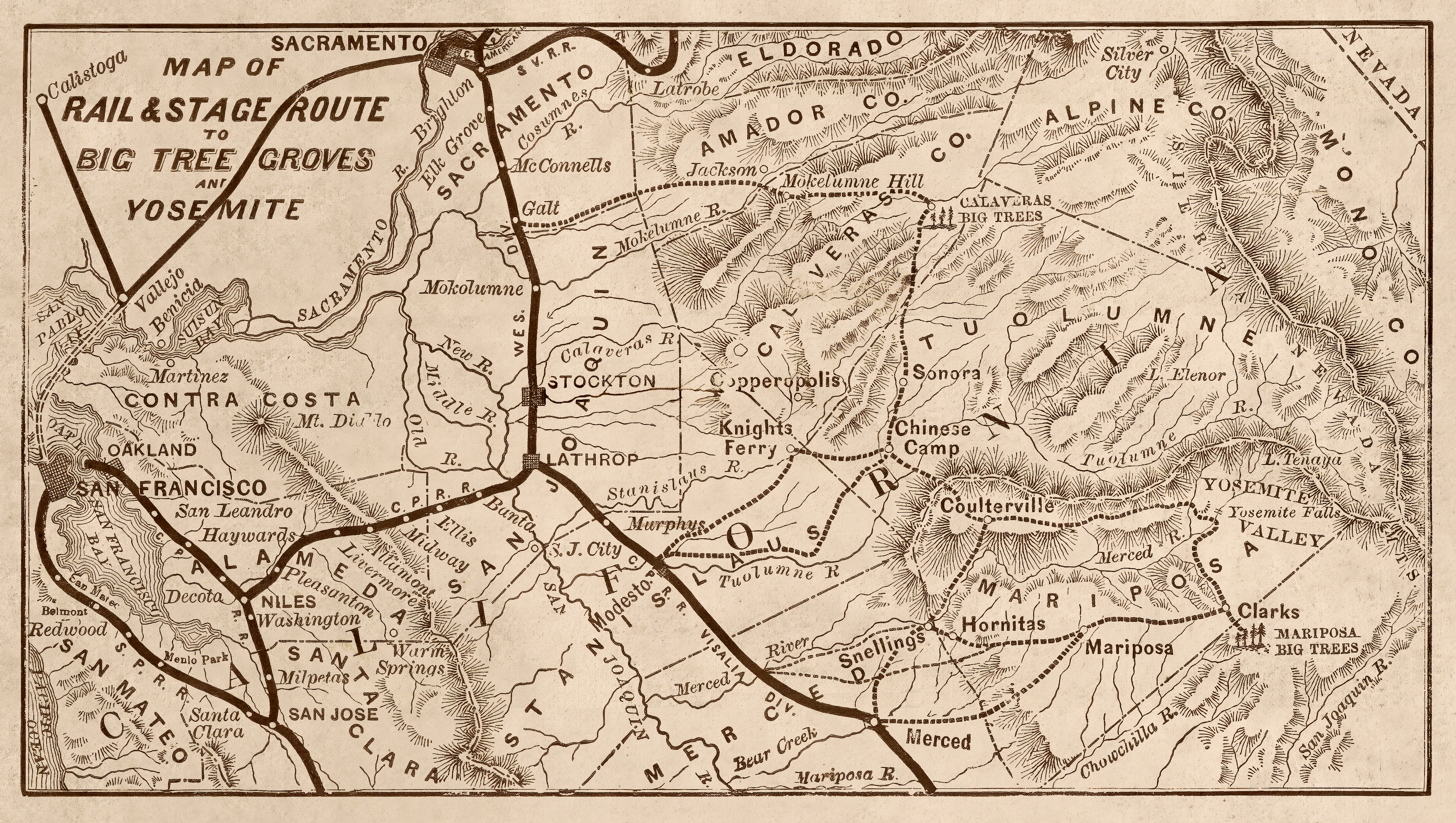
Map of rail and stage routes to Yosemite, 1899.

In 1859, the Yosemite Turnpike Company pioneered wheeled vehicle access to Yosemite. They initially constructed a stage road up to Crane Flat, a distance of sixteen miles from the valley. After negotiating with Yosemite commissioners, they secured the rights to build and operate a toll road into the valley, enjoying a ten-year exclusivity period along the route. This agreement led to the commencement of the Coulterville Road construction in 1870, which they completed on June 17, 1874. Two other competing routes, the Big Oak Flat Road (July 1874) and the Wawona Road (1875), quickly followed.

The completion of the first transcontinental railroad, along with the extension of Central Pacific Railroad services to towns in the San Joaquin Valley, boosted tourism from across the country. From the railway terminals in Stockton, Modesto, Copperopolis, Berenda, Merced, and Madera, seven routes competed to ferry tourists via stagecoach to Yosemite Valley.

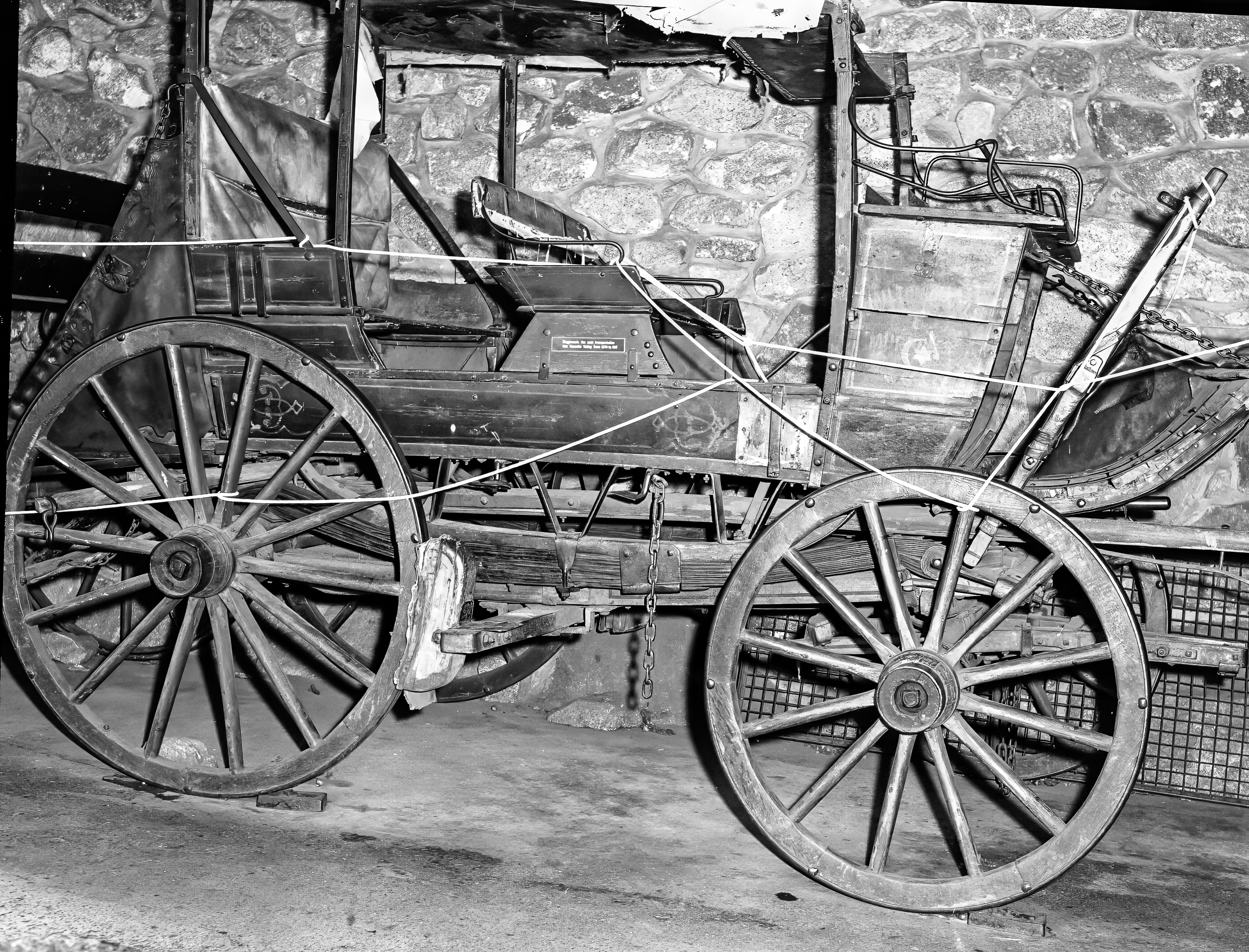
Mud Wagons served Yosemite Valley when roads were unsuitable for standard coaches.

The Yosemite Stage and Turnpike Company ran a fleet of 40 stagecoaches and buggies, drawn by a stable of 700 horses. During the summer, as many as eleven stages left daily from Raymond train station, traveling to various Yosemite destinations. Their primary vehicle was the Concord coach, though a "mud wagon" was used in poor weather.

Horses were switched at nine stations between Raymond and Kennyville, where the Ahwahnee Hotel now stands. Freight wagons, capable of carrying five tons and drawn by ten-mule teams, delivered large amounts of hay and supplies to these stations.

The trip from Raymond to Wawona was a 44 mi (71 km), ten-hour journey with a lunch stop at Ahwahnee. After spending the night at Wawona, passengers had a further six-hour, 20 mi (32 km) journey to Yosemite Valley. Telegraph lines and Wells Fargo offices along the stage route further tied Yosemite to the outside world.

The excitement of traveling by stagecoach was often heightened due to the risk of robberies. Between 1883 and 1906, the Mariposa Gazette recorded six instances of stagecoach holdups.

During the forty-year stagecoach era, Yosemite underwent significant changes, evolving into a national park and seeing the introduction of new hotels, public campgrounds, road improvements, and electricity.

The decline of the stagecoach era began in the early 20th century with the introduction of the Yosemite Valley Railroad in 1907, which reduced the stage companies' traffic significantly. The rise of personal automobiles and auto stage coaches also contributed to this decline. By May 1916, the stagecoach era effectively ended with the final commercial stagecoach trip departing from Yosemite.

=== Yosemite Valley Railroad ===
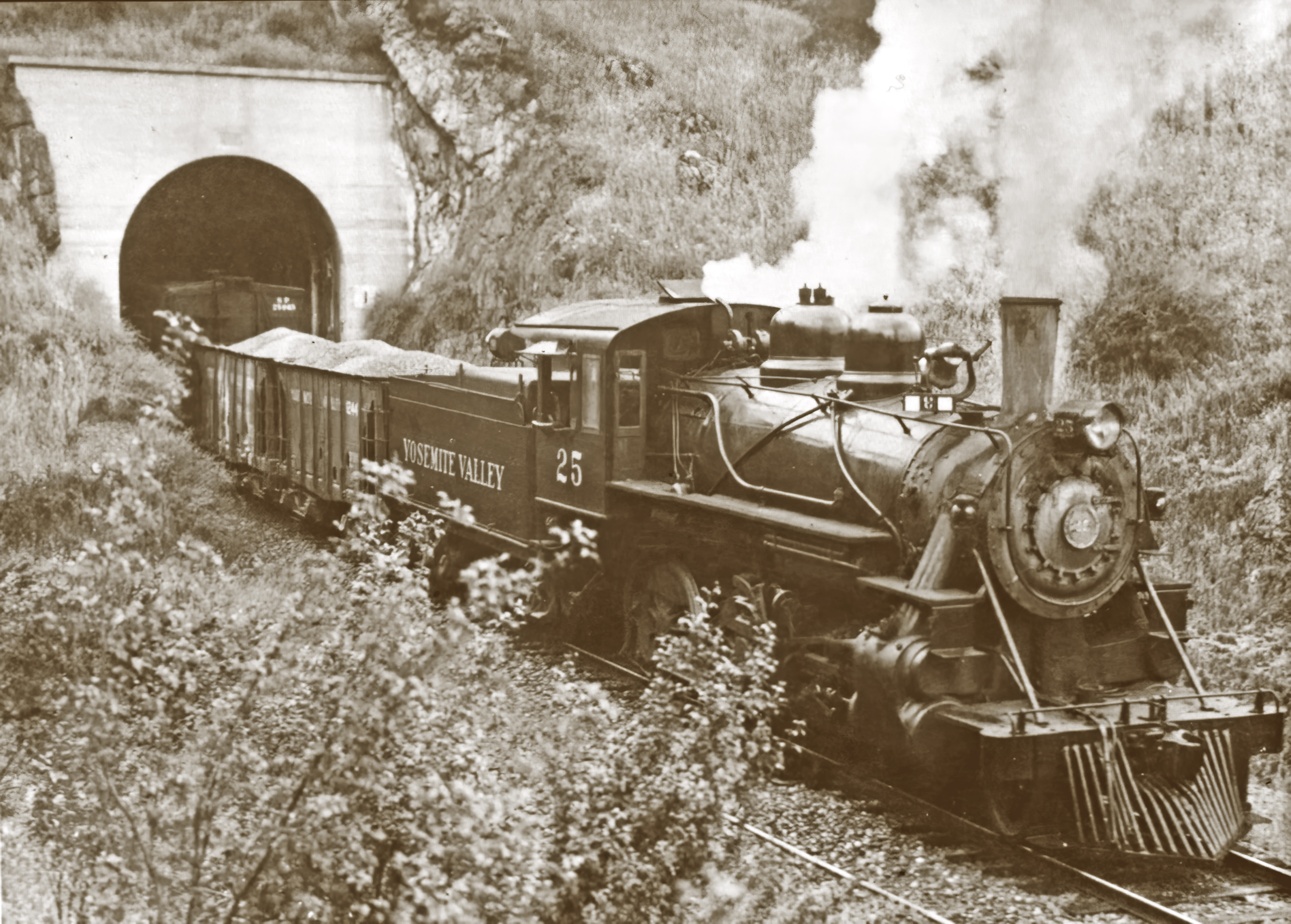
The Yosemite Valley Railroad rendered the two-day stagecoach journey obsolete.

The Yosemite Valley Railroad, operating in California from 1907 to 1945, transformed regional travel and tourism. It stretched from Merced to El Portal, the edge of Yosemite National Park, offering a safer, more comfortable option compared to the grueling two-day stagecoach trips common since the mid-1870s. However, as the automobile became more widespread in the 1920s, the railroad's popularity began to wane. This decline continued into the 1940s with the opening of the nearby Yosemite All-Year Highway.

=== The First Automobile in Yosemite ===
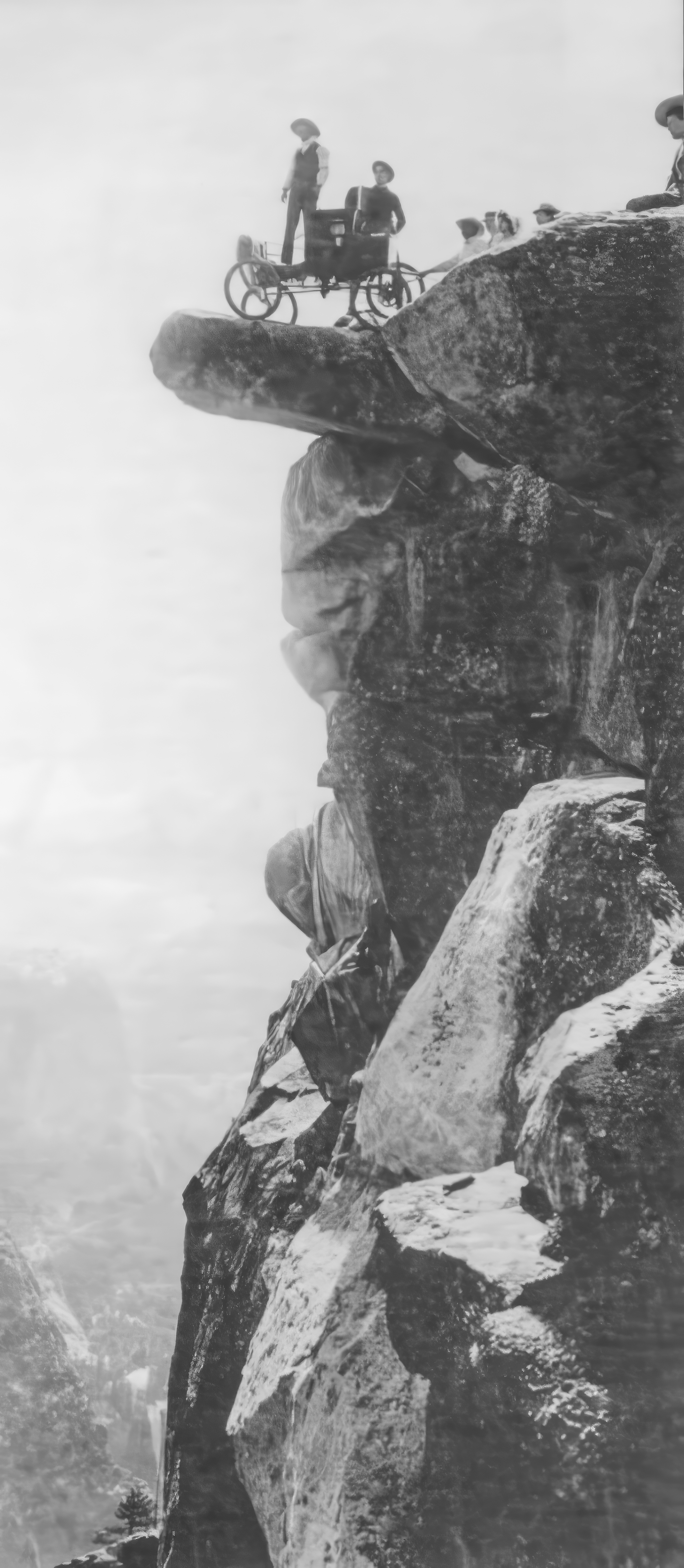
The first motor vehicle in Yosemite Valley, perched 3,200 feet above the valley on Glacier Point.

On June 23, 1900, Oliver Lippincott and Edward E. Russell made history by driving a motor vehicle, a Locomobile, into Yosemite Valley for the first time. Their journey was an attempt by Lippincott, a photography entrepreneur, to garner attention for a new store he intended to open in the valley, as well as to promote the Locomobile company. The Locomobile was a two-cylinder, ten-horsepower steam engine with a top speed of up to 40 miles per hour (64 km/h). Russell, a machine shop owner, acted as the driver-mechanic for the trip.

The Locomobile was transported from Los Angeles to Fresno via freight, and then driven to Raymond. The 44 miles (71 km) journey to Wawona was completed in slightly over five hours, significantly faster than the typical full-day travel time by stagecoach. The final 30 miles (48 km) stretch to Yosemite Valley was covered in exactly three hours.

While in Yosemite Valley, they attracted a lot of attention. Notably, Yosemite Stage and Turnpike Company superintendent Henry Washburn was quite intrigued. After a five-hour drive to Glacier Point, the Locomobile was photographed atop a rock that was an impressive 3,200 feet (980 m) feet above the valley floor.

Despite the historic trip, it took another twelve years for motor vehicles to gradually replace horse-drawn stages on Yosemite routes.

=== The Automobile Era ===
During the advent of automobiles in Yosemite, locals initially opposed their introduction, leading to a ban by the park superintendent in 1906 due to safety concerns. However, by 1912, the quality and prevalence of automobiles had increased significantly. After a road rally demonstration at the National Parks Conference in the same year, John Muir predicted that regulated car access would soon be a norm in all parks. Secretary of the Interior Franklin K. Lane lifted the ban in 1913, albeit with stringent regulations, including a 10 miles per hour (16 km/h) speed limit.

Despite regulations, the number of car visitors to Yosemite surged after road improvements in 1914, further encouraged by the Yosemite Stage and Turnpike Company replacing horse-drawn carriages with automobiles between 1913 and 1916. However, costs remained high due to tolls and government fees.

Motorists' demand for the modernization of Yosemite's 152 miles (245 km) miles of roads, including 106 miles (171 km) miles of toll or private roads, prompted the government to construct a new low-elevation, year-round access route from 1918 to 1926. This development significantly boosted the park's automobile traffic, nearly tripling from 49,229 cars in 1925 to 137,296 in 1927.

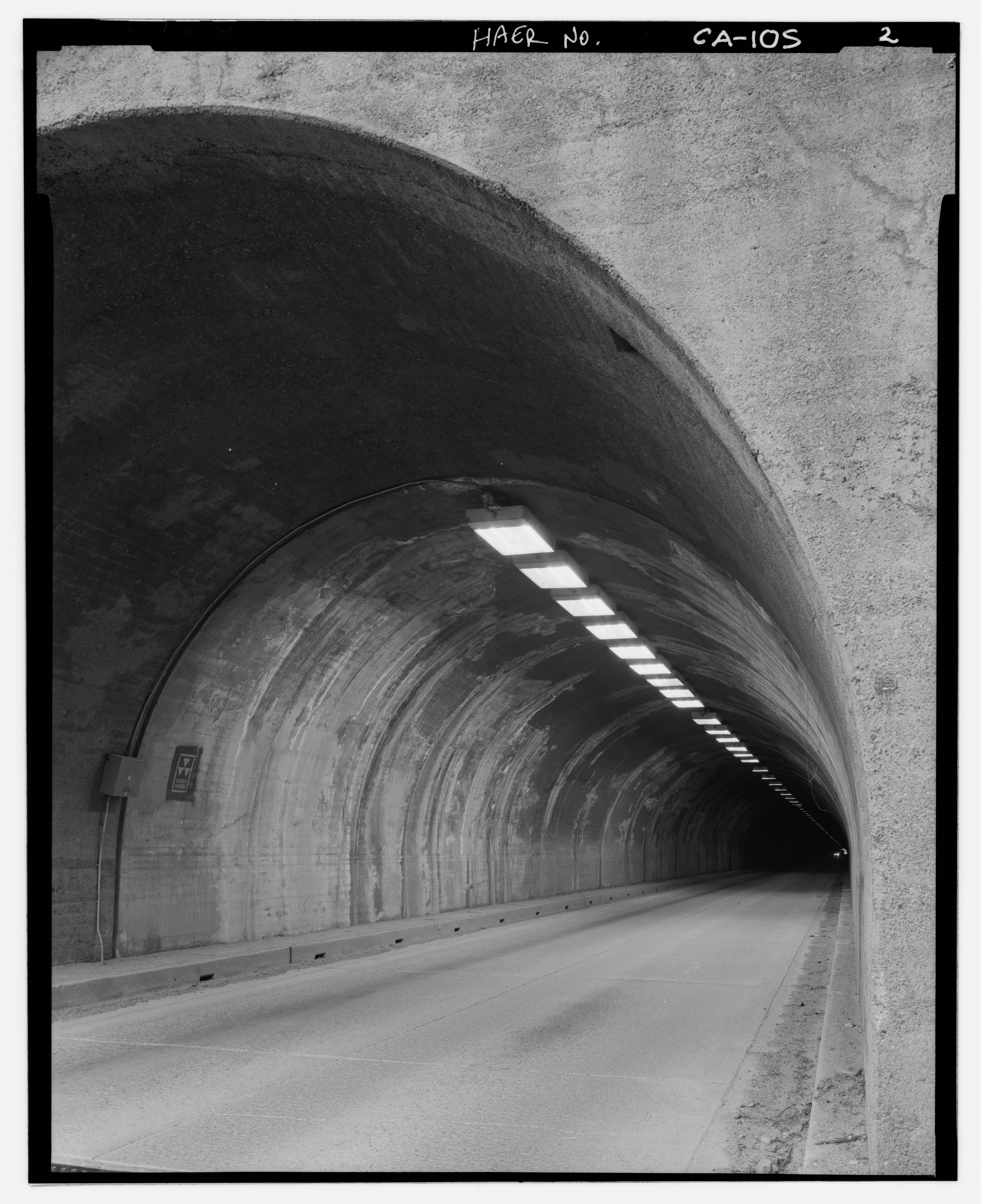
Wawona Tunnel.

In 1933, construction began on a 35-mile stretch of Highway 41 between the Yosemite Valley and Mariposa Big Trees in preparation for the opening of the Wawona Tunnel, which cut through nearly a 1 mile (1.6 km) of solid granite.

By 1980, Yosemite Valley's landscape was significantly altered by approximately 30 miles (48 km) miles of roadways accommodating around a million vehicles annually. Recognizing the detrimental impact of this vehicular traffic, the National Park Service identified private automobiles as a major threat to the park in its 1980 General Management Plan. The agency set an ambitious goal to eliminate all private vehicles from Yosemite Valley and Mariposa Grove to preserve the wilderness and natural beauty. However, the ten-year deadline for this implementation was largely ignored due to the goals' perceived impracticality according to Park Superintendent Jack Morehead.

In the 2010s, the influx of private vehicles into the park led to significant congestion, as up to 8,200 daily visitors vied for just 5,400 designated parking spaces.

== Human impact ==
Plans for reducing human impact on the park were released by the Park Service in 1980. The General Management Plan specified a reduction of 17 percent in overnight accommodations, a 68 percent reduction in staff housing and removal of golf courses and tennis courts by 1990, yet there were still 1,300 buildings in Yosemite Valley and 17 acres (6.9 ha) of the valley floor were covered by parking lots in the late 1990s. The goals were not met, but flooding in January 1997 destroyed park infrastructure in Yosemite Valley. The Yosemite Valley Plan was later established to implement the General Management Plan and over 250 other actions.

=== Forests and meadows ===
The Awahnechee and other aboriginal groups changed the environment of the Yosemite area. Parts of valley floors were intentionally burned each year to encourage the growth of acorn-bearing black oaks. Fire kept forests open, reducing the risk of ambush, and the open areas helped to expand and maintain meadows.

Early park guardians drained swamps, which reduced the number and extent of meadows. In the 1860s there were over 750 acres (300 ha) of meadows in the valley compared to 340 acres (140 ha) by the end of the 20th century. The remaining meadows are maintained by manually clearing trees and shrubs. The Park Service has prohibited driving and camping in meadows, a common practice in the 1910s to 1930s and cattle and horses are no longer allowed to roam freely in the park.

Fire suppression encouraged the growth of young coniferous trees, such as ponderosa pine and incense cedar; adult conifers create enough shade to inhibit the growth of young black oak trees. By the 20th century, fire suppression and the lowering of water tables by draining swamps led to the establishment of dense conifer forests where mixed and open conifer-oak woodlands had previously grown. Fire suppression policies have been replaced by a fire management program which includes the annual use of prescribed fires. Fire is especially important to the giant sequoia groves, whose seeds cannot germinate without fire-touched soil.

Logging used to be carried out in the area. Over one-half-billion board feet of timber were felled between World War I and 1930, when John D. Rockefeller Jr. and the federal government bought out the Yosemite Lumber Company.

=== Increases in visitation ===
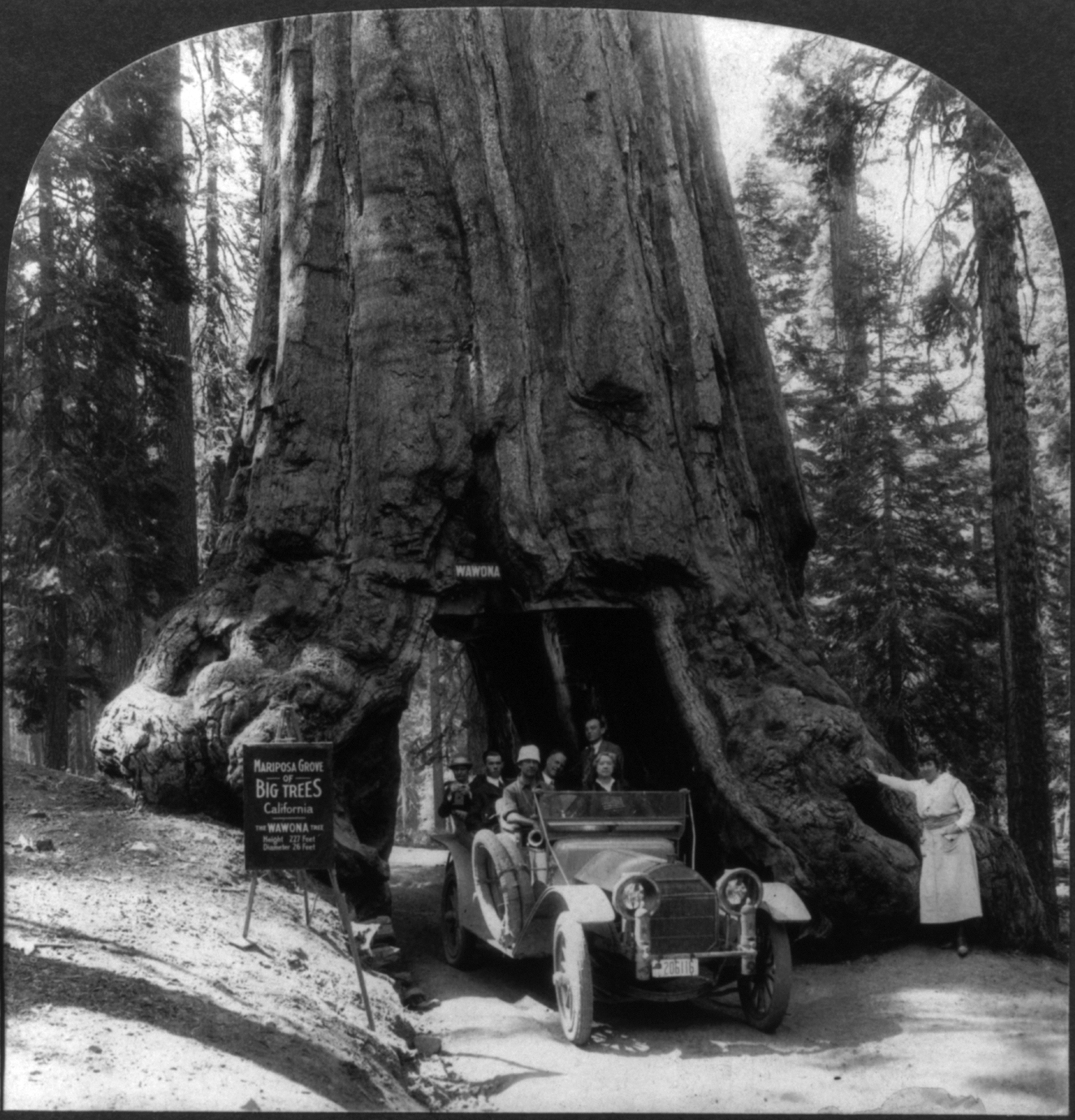
The Wawona Tree in 1918. The tunnel was cut in 1881; the tree collapsed in 1969. Its estimated age was 2,300 years.

Muir and the Sierra Club initially encouraged efforts to increase visitation to the park. Muir wrote that even the "frivolous and inappreciative" visitors were on the whole "a most hopeful sign of the times, indicating at least the beginning of our return to nature – for going to the mountains is going home."

The first automobile entered Yosemite Valley in 1900, but growth in car traffic did not increase significantly until 1913, when they were first officially allowed to enter; the next year, 127 cars entered the park.

Park visitation increased from 15,154 in 1914, to 35,527 in 1918, and to 461,000 in 1929. Two-thirds of a million visited in 1946, 1 million in 1954, 2 million by 1966, 3 million in the 1980s, and 4 million in the 1990s.

=== Recreational activities ===
Half Dome is a prominent and iconic granite dome that rises 4,737 feet (1,444 m) above the floor of Yosemite Valley. It was first climbed on October 12, 1875, by the Scottish blacksmith of Yosemite Valley, George C. Anderson. A rope that Anderson laid was used by six men, including 61-year-old Galen Clark, and one woman, to scale the last 975 feet (297 m) of Half Dome. Anderson's rope was repaired several times and was replaced in 1919 by a stairway built by the Sierra Club.

Sunnyside walk-in campground, better known as Camp 4, was built in 1929. Rock climbers, who started to scale the cliffs of Yosemite in the 1950s, camped there. In 1997, a flood in Yosemite Valley destroyed employee housing in the valley. The Park Service wanted to build dormitories next to Camp 4, but Tom Frost, the American Alpine Club and others succeeded in killing the plan. Camp 4 was listed on the National Register of Historic Places on February 21, 2003, because of its role in the development of rock climbing as a sport.

Badger Pass Ski Area was established in 1935. The 9-hole Wawona Golf Course opened in June 1918 in a meadow adjacent to the Wawona Hotel. A golf course was later built near the Ahwahnee Hotel in Yosemite Valley, but was removed and converted into a meadow in 1981.

=== Introduced and invasive species ===
Introduced animals and diseases had impacted the park area by the late 19th century. Galen Clark noted in the mid-1890s that native grasses and flowering plants in Yosemite Valley had been reduced in number by three-quarters.

White pine blister rust, a fungal disease that infects conifer trees, was accidentally introduced in British Columbia in 1910 and had reached California by the 1920s. It has since infected many sugar pine trees in the Yosemite area. The rust is managed by removing plants belonging to the ribes genus, which act as carriers of the fungus.

Trout were introduced in Yosemite streams and lakes to promote fishing. Tadpole predation by the introduced fish reduced frog populations. Lakes and streams are no longer stocked in the park.

Current park managers focus on controlling nine high-priority invasive plant species of noxious weeds: yellow star-thistle (Centaurea solstitialis); spotted knapweed (Centaurea maculosa); Himalayan blackberry (Rubus armeniacus); bull thistle (Cirsium vulgare); velvet grass (Holcus lanatus); cheat grass (Bromus tectorum); French broom (Genista monspessulana); Italian thistle (Carduus pycnocephalus); and perennial pepperweed (Lepidium latifolium). In 2008, the park began to use the herbicides glyphosate and aminopyralid to augment manual methods to manage the most threatening plants.

=== Wildlife ===
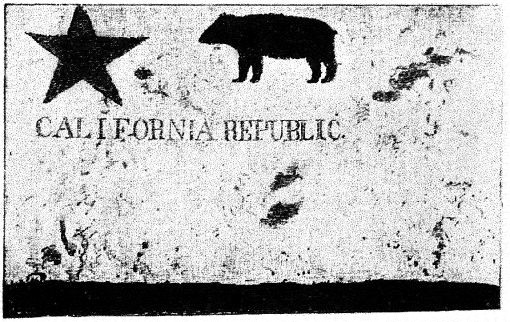
The original flag of California featured a subspecies of brown bear that was endemic to the Yosemite area, but is now extinct. This photo from 1890 shows the original Bear Flag that was destroyed in 1906.

Brown bears, also called grizzlies, featured prominently in Miwok mythology and were the top predators in the region until the 1920s, when they became locally extinct. A sketch of a Yosemite grizzly by Charles Nahl adorns the flag of California.

American black bears were a common attraction by the 1930s, but in 1929 alone 81 people required treatment for bear-related injuries. Troublesome bears were marked with white paint before being relocated to other parts of the park, and repeat offenders were killed. Bear feeding shows were stopped in 1940, but the Park Service continued to kill bears that habitually raided camps; 200 were put down between 1960 and 1972. Park visitors are now educated about proper food storage.

To supplement their incomes, the rangers trapped predators such as coyote, fox, lynx, mountain lion, and wolverine for their furs, a practice that survived until 1925. Predator control continued however; 43 mountain lions were killed in Yosemite by the state lion hunter in 1927. Cooper's hawk and sharp-shinned hawk were hunted to local extinction.

Bighorn sheep, which were driven locally extinct through hunting and disease, have been reintroduced in the east of the park. The Park Service and the Yosemite Fund have also helped peregrine falcons and great gray owls to re-establish themselves. Tule elk, which had been hunted almost to extinction, were housed in a pen in Yosemite before being moved to the Owens Valley in eastern California.
