= List of churches in the Diocese of Fresno =

This is a list of current and former Roman Catholic churches in the Roman Catholic Diocese of Fresno. The diocese consists of nine deaneries: Bakersfield Metropolitan; Fresno Metropolitan; Fresno Rural; High Desert; Kern Rural; Kings; Madera; Merced/Mariposa; and Tulare. The mother church of the diocese is St. John's Cathedral in Fresno, California.

== Bakersfield Metropolitan Vicariate ==
| Name | Image | Location | Established | Sources |
|---|---|---|---|---|
| Christ the King | | 1800 Bedford Way, Bakersfield | 1952 | |
| Holy Spirit Mission | | 724 E. Belle Terrace, Bakersfield | | |
| Shrine of Our Lady of Guadalupe, Co-Patroness of the Unborn | | 601 E. California Ave, Bakersfield | 1925 | |
| Our Lady of Perpetual Help | | 124 Columbus St, Bakersfield | 1948 | |
| Our Lady of the Snows | | 7115 Lakewood Dr, Frazier Park | 1968 | |
| Sacred Heart | | 9915 Ramos Ave, Bakersfield | 1952 | |
| St. Elizabeth Ann Seton | | 12300 Reina Rd, Bakersfield | 2008 | |
| St. Francis of Assisi | | 900 H. St, Bakersfield | 1881 | |
| St. Joseph | | 1515 Baker St, Bakersfield | 1900 | |
| St. Jude Mission | | 825 Chapman St, Bakersfield | | |
| St. Philip the Apostle | | 7100 Stockdale Hwy, Bakersfield | 1968 | |
| St. Thomas the Apostle | | 350 E Bear Mountain Blvd, Arvin | 1939 | |
| San Clemente Mission Parish | | 1305 Water St, Bakersfield | 1952 | |

== Fresno Metropolitan Vicariate ==
| Name | Image | Location | Established | Sources |
|---|---|---|---|---|
| Christ the King Mission | | 3545 W. Calvin Ave, Malaga | | |
| Divine Mercy | | Ashlan & Thompson Ave, Clovis | 2016 | |
| Holy Spirit | | 355 East Champlain Dr, Fresno | 1981 | |
| Infant Jesus of Prague Mission | | 32054 Whispering Springs Ln, Tollhouse | | |
| Our Lady of the Assumption Mission | | 13540 S. Henderson Ave, Caruthers | | |
| Our Lady of La Vang | | 4144 N. Millbrook Ave, Fresno | 2009 | |
| Our Lady of Mount Carmel | | 816 Pottle Ave, Fresno | 1955 | |
| Our Lady of Perpetual Help | | 929 Harvard Ave, Clovis | 1929 | |
| Our Lady of Victory | | 2918 N. West Ave, Fresno | 1950 | |
| Sacred Heart | | 2140 N. Cedar Ave, Fresno | 1947 | |
| St. Agnes Mission | | 111 W. Birch St, Pinedale | 1966 | |
| St. Alphonsus | | 351 E Kearney Blvd, Fresno | 1908 | |
| St. Anthony Claret | | 2494 S. Chestnut Ave, Fresno | 1952 | |
| St. Anthony of Padua | | 5770 N. Maroa Ave, Fresno | 1965 | |
| St. Genevieve | | 1127 Tulare St, Fresno | 1938 | |
| St. Helen | | 4875 E. Grant Ave, Fresno | 1955 | |
| St. John's Cathedral | | 2814 Mariposa St, Fresno | 1882 | |
| St. Jude | | 208 West Jefferson, Easton | | |
| St. Mary Queen of Apostles | | 4636 W. Dakota Ave, Fresno | 1967 | |
| St. Paul Catholic Newman Center | | 1572 E. Barstow Ave, Fresno | 1964 | |
| The Shrine of St. Thérèse | | 1444 N. Wishon Ave, Fresno | 1919 | |
| Shaver Lake Station Community Chapel | | 41340 Tollhouse Rd, Shaver Lake | | |

== Fresno Rural Vicariate ==
| Name | Image | Location | Established | Sources |
|---|---|---|---|---|
| Holy Family | | 1275 Smith St, Kingsburg | 1950 | |
| Our Lady of Sorrows | | 830 Tulare St, Parlier | 1962 | |
| St. Anthony of Padua | | 1018 N. Frankwood Ave, Reedley | 1906 | |
| St. Catherine of Siena | | 356 N. Villa Ave, Dinuba | 1947 | |
| St. Isidore the Farmer | | 480 Adams Ave, Orange Cove | 1978 | |
| St. John the Baptist Mission | | 4204 Merritt Dr, Traver | | |
| St. Joseph | | 2441 Dockery Ave, Selma | 1913 | |
| St. Katherine | | 5375 Carmel, Del Rey | 1956 | |
| St. Lucy | | 512 S. Fifth St, Fowler | 1965 | |
| St. Mary | | 12588 Avenue 407, Cutler | 1953 | |
| St. Mary | | 2590 E. North Ave, Sanger | 1922 | |
| St. Rita Mission | | 30673 George Smith Rd, Squaw Valley | | |
| Santa Cruz Mission | | 5625 Avenue 378, London | | |

== High Desert Vicariate ==
| Name | Image | Location | Established | Sources |
|---|---|---|---|---|
| Death Valley Station | | Furnace Creek | | |
| Olancha Station | | Olancha | | |
| Our Lady of Lourdes | | 9970 California City Blvd, California City | 2001 | |
| Our Lady of Perpetual Help | | 849 Home St, Bishop | 1947 | |
| St. Ann | | 446 W. Church Ave, Ridgecrest | 1946 | |
| St. Francis of Assisi Mission | | 15382 Myer Rd, Mojave | 1957 | |
| St. John the Baptist Mission | | Shoshone | | |
| St. Joseph Mission | | 12430 Boron Ave, Boron | 1969 | |
| St. Mary of the Desert | | 3100 15th St, Rosamond | 1957 | |
| St. Stephen Mission | | 461 S. Main St, Big Pine | | |
| St. Thérèse Mission | | Tecopa | | |
| St. Vivian Mission | | Independence | | |
| Santa Barbara Mission | | Randsburg | | |
| Santa Rosa | | 311 E. Locust, Lone Pine | 1919 | |

== Kern Rural Vicariate ==
| Name | Image | Location | Established | Sources |
|---|---|---|---|---|
| Nuestra Señora de la Paz (Our Lady of Peace) Mission | | Lost Hills | 1988 | |
| Our Lady of Guadalupe | | 1015 Clinton St, Delano | 1957 | |
| St. Elizabeth of Hungary | | 835 E. Perkins Ave, McFarland | 1966 | |
| St. John the Evangelist | | 1129 9th Pl, Wasco | 1919 | |
| St. Jude Thaddeus | | 1270 E. Washington, Earlimart | 1968 | |
| St. Mary | | 420 Main St, Buttonwillow | 1941 | |
| St. Mary | | 110 E. Woodrow St, Taft | 1918 | |
| St. Mary of the Miraculous Medal | | 916 Lexington St, Delano | 1920 | |
| St. Therese of Lisieux | | 300 W. Lerdo Hwy, Shafter | 1952 | |
| St. Vincent de Paul Mission | | 524 Richgrove, Richgrove | | |

== Kings Vicariate ==
| Name | Image | Location | Established | Sources |
|---|---|---|---|---|
| Holy Family Mission | | Five Points | | |
| Immaculate Heart of Mary | | 10435 Hanford-Armona Rd, Hanford | 1950 | |
| Our Lady of Lourdes | | 1404 Hanna Ave, Corcoran | 1939 | |
| Sacred Heart Mission | | 3860 Ave. 54, Alpaugh | | |
| St. Ann | | 3047 W. Mt. Whitney, Riverdale | 1928 | |
| St. Brigid | | 1001 North Douty St, Hanford | 1886 | |
| St. Cecilia Mission | | Milham and Eighth Ave, Kettleman City | | |
| St. Frances Cabrini | | 36986 Los Angeles St, Huron | 1961 | |
| St. Joseph | | 428 E. Kern St, Avenal | 1941 | |
| St. Joseph Mission | | 19300 Empire St, Stratford | | |
| St. Paul the Apostle | | 637 Sunset St, Coalinga | 1907 | |
| St. Peter Prince of Apostles | | 870 N. Lemoore Ave, Lemoore | 1912 | |
| St. Rose of Lima Mission | | Santa Rosa Rancheria | | |
| Shrine of Our Lady of Fatima | | 20855 Fatima Ave, Laton | 1953 | |

== Madera Vicariate ==
| Name | Image | Location | Established | Sources |
|---|---|---|---|---|
| Our Lady of Guadalupe | | 484 Quince St, Mendota | 1953 | |
| Our Lady of Lourdes Mission | | Three Rocks | 1964 | |
| Our Lady of the Sierra | | 40180 Indian Springs Rd, Oakhurst | 1996 | |
| Our Lady of the Snows Yosemite Valley Chapel | | 9006 Cedar Ct, Yosemite National Park | 1963 | |
| St. Agnes Chapel Mission | | Ripperdan | | |
| St. Anne Chapel Mission | | Raymond-Knowles | | |
| St. Columba | | 213 Orange Ave, Chowchilla | 1918 | |
| St. Dominic Savio Mission & Retreat Center | | Bass Lake | 1961 | |
| St. George Mission | | El Nido | | |
| St. Joachim | | 401 West 5th St, Madera | | |
| St. Joseph | | 1558 Twelfth St, Firebaugh | 1950 | |
| St. Joseph the Worker Mission | | North Fork | | |
| St. Patrick | | 15437 W. Kearney Blvd, Kerman | 1943 | |
| St. Paul | | 25592 Doughty St, Tranquillity | 1924 | |
| St. Vincent de Paul Mission | | San Joaquin | | |

== Merced/Mariposa Vicariate ==
| Name | Image | Location | Established | Sources |
|---|---|---|---|---|
| Holy Rosary | | 8471 Cypress St, Hilmar | 1947 | |
| Immaculate Conception Mission | | Buhach | | |
| Our Lady of Lourdes Mission | | Le Grand | | |
| Our Lady of Mercy | | 459 W. 21st St, Merced | 1867 | |
| Shrine of Our Lady of Miracles | | 370 Linden Ave, Gustine | 1919 | |
| Sacred Heart | | Palo Alto and Lucerne, Dos Palos | 1924 | |
| Sacred Heart | | 562 W. 13th St, Merced | 1945 | |
| Sacred Heart | | 9317 Amistad St, Planada | 1939 | |
| St. Anthony | | 1801 Winton Way, Atwater | 1913 | |
| St. Catherine of Siena Mission | | St Catherine St, Hornitos | 1880s | |
| St. Joseph | | 1621 Center Ave, Los Banos | 1905 | |
| St. Joseph | | 4985 Bullion at Second St, Mariposa | 1863 | |
| St. Jude Thaddeus | | 330 Franci St, Livingston | 1937 | |
| St. Mary Mission | | 2809 Railroad Ave, Stevinson | 1918 | |
| St. Patrick | | 671 E. Yosemite Ave, Merced | 1867 | |
| St. Teresa of Calcutta Mission | | Delhi | 1997 | |

== Tulare Vicariate ==
| Name | Image | Location | Established | Sources |
|---|---|---|---|---|
| Blessed Miguel Agustin Pro Mission | | Terra Bella | | |
| Good Shepherd Catholic Parish (4 churches) | | Visalia | | |
| Holy Cross Church | | 1765 N. Newcomb, Porterville | 2006 | |
| Holy Family Church | | 1908 North Court St, Visalia | 1950 | |
| Mater Dolorosa Mission Co-Patroness St. Kateri Tekakwitha | | Tule Indian Reservation | | |
| Nativity of the Blessed Virgin Mary (St. Mary’s) Church | | 608 N. Church St, Visalia | 1861 | |
| Our Lady of the Assumption Station | | Pixley | | |
| Sacred Heart | | 417 North E St, Exeter | 1950 | |
| Sacred Heart | | 217 Lindero Ave, Lindsay | 1925 | |
| St. Aloysius | | 125 E. Pleasant Ave, Tulare | 1905 | |
| St. Anne Church | | 378 North F St, Porterville | 1896 | |
| St. Anthony Mission | | 21631 Brooks Ave, Tonyville | | |
| St. Anthony of Egypt Mission | | 121 S. Ventura Ave, Farmersville | | |
| St. Charles Borromeo Church | | 5049 W. Caldwell Ave, Visalia | 2011 | |
| St. Clair Mission | | Three Rivers | | |
| St. Frances Cabrini | | 198 North Pepper St, Woodlake | 1963 | |
| St. Francis of Assisi Mission | | Woodville | | |
| St. James Mission | | 19752 Guthrie Dr, Strathmore | | |
| St. John the Evangelist | | 232 South Adams Rd, Tipton | 1945 | |
| St. Maximillian Kolbe Mission | | 35725 Hwy. 190, Springville | 2012 | |
| St. Rita | | 954 South O St, Tulare | 1967 | |
| St. Thomas the Apostle Church | | 6735 Ave. 308, Goshen | 1963 | |
| San Felipe de Jesús Mission | | Ivanhoe | | |
| Santa Cruz Station | | Plainview | | |
