= List of parishes in the Roman Catholic Diocese of Fresno =

List of parishes in the Diocese of Fresno, California

This is a list of parishes located in the Roman Catholic Diocese of Fresno in California in the United States, listed by vicariate.

== Vicariates ==
=== Merced/Mariposa Vicariate ===
This vicariate contains parishes in Merced and Mariposa Counties in the Central Valley of California.

Name	Image	Location	Description/sources
Holy Rosary		8471 Cypress St, Hilmar	Founded in 1948 for Portuguese immigrants, new church started in 2005
Sacred Heart		562 W 13th St, Merced	
Sacred Heart		9317 Amistad St, Planada	
Shrine of Our Lady of Miracles		370 Linden Ave, Gustine	Founded as mission in 1912, declared a shrine in 2008
St. Anthony		1799 Winton Way, Atwater	Founded in 1913, church dedicated in 1958
St. Joseph		1621 Center Ave, Los Banos	Founded in the 1870s, church dedicated in 1923
St. Joseph		4985 Bullion St, Mariposa	Dedicated in 1863, it is the oldest continuously used church in the diocese.
St. Jude Thaddeus		330 Franci St, Livingston	Founded in the 1920s for Portuguese immigrants, church dedicated in 1956
St. Patrick's Parish and Our Lady of Mercy		St. Patrick Church. 671 E Yosemite Ave, Merced	Founded as mission in 1873, church dedicated in 1994. Now merged with Our Lady of Mercy
		Our Lady of Mercy Church, 459 W. 21st St, Merced	Church dedicated in 1918, now merged with St. Patrick

=== Madera Vicariate ===
This vicariate contains parishes in Madera County in the Central Valley.

Name	Image	Location	Description/sources
Our Lady of Guadalupe		484 Quince St, Mendota	
Our Lady of the Sierra		40180 Indian Springs Rd, Oakhurst	Founded as mission in 1939, became parish in 1999 and church dedicated that same year
Sacred Heart		1801 Palo Alto St., Dos Palos	Founded in 1924, church dedicated in 1947
St. Columba		213 Orange Ave, Chowchilla	Founded in 1918, church dedicated in 1963
St. Joachim		401 W. 5th St, Madera	
		St. Agnes Mission Church, 7308 Hwy 145, Madera	Constructed as a school in 1913, dedicated as a church in 1951. Supervised by St. Joachim Parish
		St. Anne Mission Church, 36483 Rd 606, Knowles-Raymond	Constructed as a school in 1920, dedicated as a church in 1962. Supervised by St. Joachim Parish
St. Joseph		1558 12th St, Firebaugh	
St. Patrick		15437 W. Kearney Blvd, Kerman	
St. Paul		25592 Doughty Ave, Tranquillity	Founded in 1920s, church dedicated in 1924

=== Fresno Metropolitan Vicariate ===
This vicariate contains parishes in Fresno, Clovis and Easton in the Central Valley.

Name	Image	Location	Description/sources
Divine Mercy		2525 Alluvial Ave, Clovis	Founded in 2016
Holy Spirit		355 E. Champlain Dr, Fresno	Founded in 1981, church dedicated in 2001
Our Lady of La Vang		4144 N. Millbrook Ave, Fresno	
Our Lady of Mount Carmel		816 Pottle Ave, Fresno	Founded in 1955
Our Lady of Perpetual Help		929 Harvard Ave, Clovis	
Our Lady of Victory		2838 N. West Ave, Fresno	Founded in 1919.
Sacred Heart		2140 N. Cedar Ave, Fresno	Founded in 1947, dedicated in 1958
Shrine of St. Therese		855 E. Floradora Ave, Fresno	Founded in 1919, church dedicated in 1957
St. Anthony Claret		2494 S. Chestnut Ave, Fresno	
St. Anthony of Padua		5770 N. Maroa Ave, Fresno	Founded as a mission in the 1920s, church dedicated in 1968, became a parish in 1978
St. Alphonsus		351 E. Kearney Blvd, Fresno	
St. Genevieve		1127 Tulare St, Fresno	
St. Helen		4870 E. Belmont Ave, Fresno	
St John the Baptist Cathedral		2814 Mariposa St, Fresno	Founded as parish in 1882, church dedicated in 1908, designated as cathedral in 1922
St. Jude & Our Lady of the Assumption Catholic Community		St. Jude Church, 208 W. Jefferson Avenue, Easton	Now merged with Our Lady of the Assumption Parish.
		Our Lady of the Assumption Church, 13540 S. Henderson Rd, Caruthers	Now merged with St. Jude Parish.
St. Mary Queen of Apostles		4636 W. Dakota Ave, Fresno	Founded as mission in the 1950s, church dedicated in 1962, became parish in 1967
St. Paul Catholic Newman Center		1572 E. Barstow Ave, Fresno	Founded in 1953 to serve California State University, Fresno, community. Chapel dedicated in 1964

=== Fresno Rural Vicariate ===
This vicariate contains parishes in Fresno County in the Central Valley

Name	Image	Location	Description/sources
Holy Family		1275 Smith St, Kingsburg	
Our Lady of Sorrows		830 Tulare St, Parlier	
St. Anthony of Padua		1060 F St, Reedley	Founded in 1906, church dedicated in 1911
St. Catherine of Siena		356 N Villa Ave, Dinuba	
St. Isidore the Farmer		480 Adams Ave, Orange Cove	Founded in 1978
St. Joseph		2441 Dockery Ave, Selma	Founded in the 1880s, church dedicated in 1961
St. Lucy		512 S, 5th St, Fowler	Church dedicated in the 1960s
St. Mary		12588 Avenue 407, Cutler	
St. Mary		828 O St, Sanger	Founded as mission in 1901, became parish in 1925, church consecrated in 2000
		St. Katherine Mission Church, 5375 Carmel, Del Rey	Founded in 1944. Supervised by St. Mary Parish in Sanger

=== Kings Vicariate ===
This vicariate contains parishes in Kings County in the Central Valley and the Sierra Nevada Mountains.

Name	Image	Location	Description/sources
Immaculate Heart of Mary		10435 Hanford Armona Rd, Hanford	Founded in the 1950s
Our Lady of Lourdes		1404 Hanna Ave, Corcoran	
Shrine of Our Lady of Fatima		20855 S Fatima Ave, Laton	Founded in 1953, church started in 1954, declared a national shrine in 1984
St. Ann		3047 W Mount Whitney Ave, Riverdale	Founded in 1928 for Portuguese immigrants, church dedicated in 1949
St. Bridgid		Hanford	Founded as mission in 1880s for Portuguese immigrants
St. Frances Cabrini		36986 Los Angeles St, Huron	
St. Joseph		428 E Kern St, Avenal	Founded in the 1940s
St. Paul the Apostle		637 Sunset St, Coalinga	Founded in 1907, church dedicated in 1949
St. Peter Prince of Apostles		870 N Lemoore Ave, Lemoore	Founded in early 1900s, church dedicated in 2011

=== Tulare Vicariate ===
Name	Image	Location	Description/sources
Good Shepherd Catholic Parish		Holy Family Church, 1908 N Court St, Visalia	Founded in 1950, church dedicated in the 1960s. Now part of Good Shepherd Parish
		St. Charles Borromeo Church, 5049 W. Caldwell Ave, Visalia	Now part of Good Shepherd Parish
		St. Mary Church, 608 N. Church St, Visalia	Founded in 1861, now part of Good Shepherd Parish
		St. Thomas the Apostle Church, 6735 Avenue 308, Visalia	Church dedicated in 1962, parish founded in 1963. Now part of Good Shepherd Parish
Sacred Heart		417 N. E St, Exeter	
Sacred Heart		217 Lindero Ave, Lindsay	
St. Aloysius		125 E. Pleasant Ave, Tulare	Founded in 1893, church dedicated in 1970
St. Anne		368 N. F St, Porterville	Founded as mission in 1865, became parish in 1896, church dedicated in 1952
		Holy Cross Mission Church, 1765 N. Newcomb St, Porterville	Supervised by St. Anne Parish
		St. Maximillian Kolbe Mission Church, 35725 CA-190, Springville	Supervised by St. Anne Parish
		Blessed Miguel Agustin Pro Mission, 9120 Rd 236, Terra Bella	Supervised by St. Anne Parish
St. Frances Cabrini		199 N Pepper St, Woodlake	Founded in 1955, church dedicated in 1963
St. John the Evangelist		232 Adams Rd, Tipton	Founded in the 1930s for Portuguese immigrants, church dedicated in 1945
St. Rita		954 S. O St, Tulare	Founded as a mission in 1945, church dedicated in 1955, became a parish in 1967

=== Bakersfield Metro Vicariate ===
This vicariate contains parishes in Bakersfield and other communities

Name	Image	Location	Description/sources
Christ the King		1800 Bedford Way, Bakersfield	Founded as mission in 1948, church dedicated in 1950, became a parish in 1952
Holy Spirit Mission		724 E. Belle Ter, Bakersfield	Church dedicated in 1952
Our Lady of Perpetual Help		124 Columbus St, Bakersfield	
Our Lady of the Snows Mission		7115 Lakewood Dr, Frazier Park	Founded in the 1960s, church consecrated in 1968
Sacred Heart		9915 Ramos Ave, Bakersfield	Founded in 1952
San Clemente Mission Parish		1305 Water St, Bakersfield	Founded as mission in 1948, became parish in 2008
Shrine of Our Lady of Guadalupe		601 E, California Ave, Bakersfield	Founded in 1925 for Mexican immigrants, church dedicated in 2012
St. Augustine		10601 Myrtle Ave, Lamont	
St. Elizabeth Ann Seton		12300 Reina Rd, Bakersfield	Founded in 2008, church dedicated in 2015
St. Francis of Assisi		900 H St, Bakersfield	Founded in 1884
St. Joseph		1515 Baker St, Bakersfield	Founded in 1907, church dedicated in 1953
St. Jude		86 Nellie Dent Dr, Wofford Heights	
St. Philip the Apostle		7100 Stockdale Hwy, Bakersfield	
St. Thomas the Apostle		350 E Bear Mountain Blvd, Arvin	

=== Kern Rural Vicariate ===
Name	Image	Location	Description/sources
Our Lady of Guadalupe		1015 Clinton St, Delano	
St. Elizabeth		835 E Perkins Ave, McFarland	
St. John the Evangelist		1300 9th Pl, Wasco	
St. Jude Thaddeus		1270 E Washington St, Earlimart	Church construction started in 1960, parish founded in 1968
St. Mary		110 E Woodrow St, Taft	Founded in 1918, church dedicated in 1951.
		St. Mary Church, 420 N Main St, Buttonwillow	Supervised by St. Mary Parish in Taft since 1990
St. Therese		300 W Lerdo Hwy, Shafter	Founded in 1952

=== High Desert Vicariate ===
This vicariate contains parishes in the Owens Valley and High Desert regions of Eastern California.

Name	Image	Location	Description/sources
Our Lady of Lourdes		9970 California City Blvd, California City	
		St. Joseph Mission Church, 12456 Boron Ave, Boron	Supervised by Our Lady of Lourdes Parish
Our Lady of Perpetual Help		849 Home St, Bishop	Founded in 1947, church dedicated in 1970
Santa Rosa		311 E, Locust St, Lone Pine	Founded in 1919
St. Ann		446 W. Church Ave, Ridgecrest	Founded in 1946, church dedicated in 1960
St. Malachy		407 W. E St, Tehachapi	Founded in 1887, church dedicated in 1967
St. Mary of the Desert		3100 15th St. W, Rosamond	
