= San Joaquin Valley and Yosemite Railroad =

First rail route to Yosemite Valley

Overview
- Parent company: Southern Pacific Company
- Locale: Berenda, California and Raymond, California area
- Dates of operation: February 15, 1886–1956

Technical
- Track gauge: 4 ft 8 1/2 in (1,435 mm) standard gauge
- Length: 21 miles (34 km)

The San Joaquin Valley and Yosemite Railroad was a 21-mile (34 km) railroad between Berenda and Raymond, California. The railroad was incorporated by the Southern Pacific on February 15, 1886, and provided a rail connection for travelers continuing by stagecoach to Yosemite Valley. The company was consolidated into the Southern Pacific Railroad on May 14, 1888. Southern Pacific continued to operate the route, later known as the Raymond Branch, until the mid-20th century.

== History ==
=== Incorporation and Early Operations ===
The San Joaquin Valley and Yosemite Railroad was incorporated by the Southern Pacific Company on February 15, 1886. The 21-mile (34 km) line ran from Berenda to Raymond. On May 14, 1888, the railroad was consolidated into the Southern Pacific Railroad.

=== Route to Yosemite ===
Raymond served as a transfer point for travelers bound for Yosemite Valley. Passengers arriving by rail continued by stagecoach for approximately 60 miles (97 km) to Yosemite.

== Decline and abandonment ==
The Yosemite Valley Railroad began service between Merced and El Portal in 1907, providing a more direct rail route for travelers bound for Yosemite. A 2.3-mile (3.7 km) branch from Knowles Junction to Knowles had opened in 1890, but a proposed 20-mile (32 km) extension was never built.

Southern Pacific continued to operate the line as its Raymond Branch, carrying freight from the Raymond granite quarry and farms along the route. The track east of Daulton was abandoned by 1942, and the remaining section between Berenda and Daulton was abandoned in 1956.

On March 27, 1955, the California-Nevada Railroad Historical Society operated a railfan excursion over the remaining line.

== See also ==
- List of United States railroads
- List of California railroads
