= Daulton, California =

Unincorporated community in California, United States

Daulton
- Unincorporated community
- Location in California Daulton (the United States)
- Coordinates: 37°07′09″N 119°58′56″W
- Country: United States
- State: California
- County: Madera
- Elevation: 404 ft (123 m)

Daulton was an unincorporated community in Madera County, California, United States. It was located on the Southern Pacific Railroad Raymond Branch (formerly the San Joaquin Valley and Yosemite Railroad), 8 miles (13 km) south-southwest of Raymond, at an elevation of 404 feet (123 m).

A post office operated at Daulton from 1899 to 1908. The name honors Henry Clay Daulton, chairman of the commission that established Madera County, who gave the railroad right of way on his land.

Daulton was the site of a copper mine established in the 1860s and operated by the California Copper Company. Copper ore from the Copper Queen, California Copper Company, Questo, and Adobe Ranch mines was shipped by team or rail to a smelter at Madera. The rail line from Daulton to Raymond was abandoned and removed in 1946, and the remainder of the railroad was abandoned in 1956. Little remains at the site today.
