= Berenda, California =

Unincorporated community in California, United States

Berenda
- Unincorporated community
- Location in California Berenda (the United States)
- Coordinates: 37°02′25″N 120°09′13″W
- Country: United States
- State: California
- County: Madera
- Elevation: 253 ft (77 m)

Berenda (Spanish: Berrenda, meaning "female antelope") was an unincorporated community in Madera County, California, United States. It is located on the north bank of Berenda Creek, 3.3 miles (5.3 km) southeast of Fairmead, and 7 miles (11 km) northwest of Madera, at an elevation of 253 feet (77 m). Berenda is located on the Southern Pacific Railroad.

== History ==
Berenda, initially called Berendo, was established in 1872 with the construction of the Union Pacific Railroad. This development led to the creation of several towns along what would become known as the Southern Pacific route. Berenda started with just a store and a hotel. Its original name, a misunderstanding of the Spanish "Berrenda" for "female antelope," was officially corrected to "Berenda" by 1888, although the post office continued using the old name until 1919.

The railroad's arrival turned Berenda into an agricultural hub, promoting the export of wheat and barley. The town grew to include hotels, dining rooms, general stores, blacksmith shops, a laundry, saloons, and a schoolhouse, donated by Henry Miller, a notable landowner, along with five acres of land.

The importance of Berenda increased when it became a key transfer point for passengers and goods traveling to Yosemite, especially after the San Joaquin Valley and Yosemite Railroad rail branch to Raymond was completed in 1886, making it the primary route for Yosemite visitors.

The town was largely destroyed by fire in 1907 but was rebuilt. Nonetheless, its role as a Yosemite gateway diminished significantly with the opening of the Yosemite Valley Railroad from Merced in 1907. The Berenda post office closed in 1935. The town was mostly wiped off the map in 1949 when US 99 was expanded into a four-lane divided highway.
