= Church of St. Joseph (Los Banos, California) =

Historic church in California, United States

- U.S. National Register of Historic Places
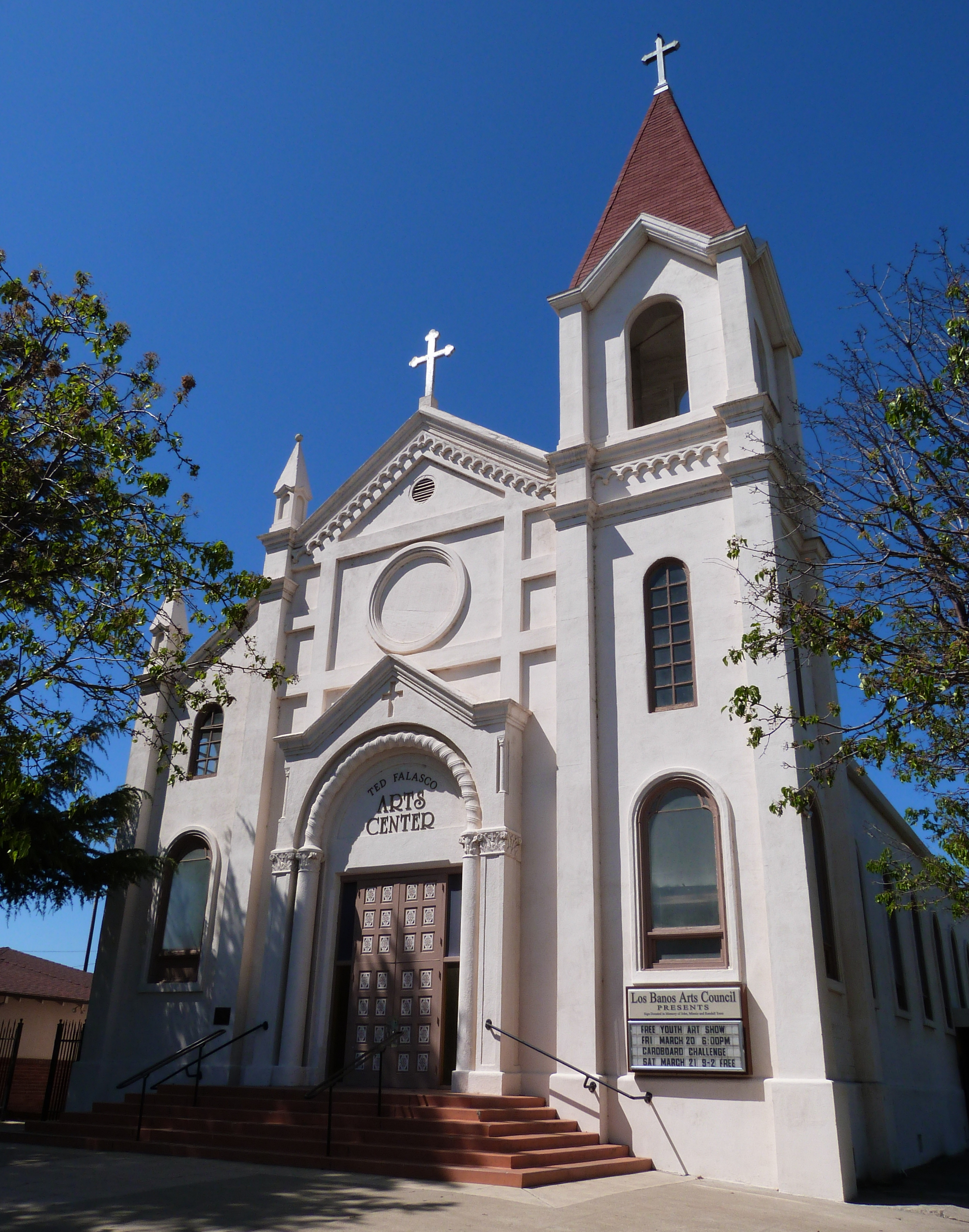
- The Church of St. Joseph in 2015

- Location within California Location within the United States
- Location: 1109 K Street; Los Banos, California
- Coordinates: 37°03′35″N 120°51′04″W
- Area: less than one acre
- Built: 1923
- Built by: Guy H. Wilson
- Architect: Charles Fantoni
- Architectural style: Romanesque
- NRHP reference No.: 04000330
- Added to NRHP: July 8, 2004

The Church of St. Joseph is a historic church building located at 1109 K Street in Los Banos, California. Built in 1923, the church was designed in the Romanesque Revival style, a common style for church buildings. Charles Fantoni, a San Francisco architect, designed the church; it is one of only three surviving Fantoni designs, the other two being Saints Peter and Paul Church in San Francisco and Our Lady Help of Christians Church in Watsonville, California. The church's design features extensive use of rounded arches, arches and vaults in both the interior and exterior of the building, and a low pitched roof atop the apse. The church is the only Romanesque building in Los Banos and its surrounding communities. The building no longer functions as a church and is used by the Los Banos Arts Council.

The Church of St. Joseph was added to the National Register on July 8, 2004.
