= Abram Wood =

Military superintendent of Yosemite National Park

Abram E. Wood
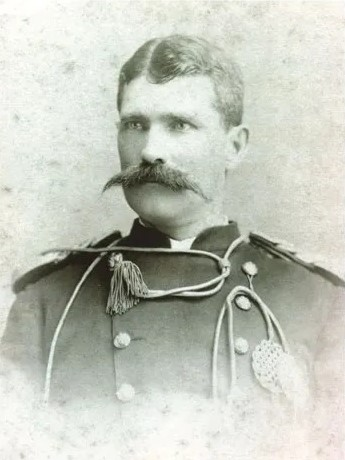
- Born: September 4, 1844; Iowa
- Died: April 14, 1894 (aged 49); San Francisco, California
- Military career
- Allegiance: United States of America
- Branch: United States Volunteers (Union Army); United States Army
- Service years: 1861–1865 (USV); 1872–1894 (USA)
- Rank: Captain
- Units: 13th Iowa Infantry; 4th U.S. Cavalry
- Commands: Yosemite National Park (1891–1893)
- Conflicts: American Civil War; American Indian Wars

Captain Abram Epperson Wood (September 4, 1844 – April 14, 1894) was an officer in the United States Army between 1872 and 1894, and the first acting Military Superintendent of Yosemite National Park.

== Biography ==
=== Civil War ===
Wood was born in Iowa on September 4, 1844 and served as a volunteer in the Union Army during the American Civil War. He enlisted in the 13th Iowa Volunteer Infantry Regiment on September 17, 1861, at the age of seventeen, and was appointed a corporal in Company F the following month. Following the Battle of Shiloh, in which he was wounded, he was promoted to sergeant, and later participated in the battles of Corinth, Jackson and Meridian in Mississippi. He reenlisted on January 1, 1864, and was made a first sergeant, and campaigned in Georgia and the Carolinas in 1864–65. Wood mustered out at Louisville, Kentucky, on July 21, 1865, as second lieutenant of Company F. He returned to Iowa, where he received three years of preparatory education for the academic rigors of the United States Military Academy.

=== Regular Army ===
Wood entered the U.S. Military Academy at West Point, New York, on July 1, 1868, at the age of twenty-three under a special Congressional dispensation, graduating 14th in order of merit in a class of 57 on June 14, 1872.

He was appointed a second lieutenant of the 4th Cavalry and sent west to serve on the Texas frontier between 1872 and 1875. He was posted successively at Fort Richardson (September 24 to December 21, 1872), Fort Concho (January 4 to May 23, 1873), Fort Clark (June 8, 1873, to August 6, 1874), and at Fort Richardson again until March 14, 1875. While at Fort Clark, he participated with the 4th Cavalry on extended campaigning in the field between June 1873 and May 1874 seeking to stop Kickapoo and Apache incursions into Texas from Mexico. In August and December 1874, during the expedition to subdue the Southern Plains tribes, Wood's company was with a battalion that repelled an attack on their camp on September 26 by Comanche Indians at Tule Canyon on the Staked Plain. Following the successful conclusion of the campaign at the Battle of Palo Duro Canyon two days later, Wood was with his company stationed at Fort Sill; the Cheyenne Agency, Dakota Territory; and Fort Reno until October 11, 1876.

On October 18, 1876, Wood was assigned to the faculty at West Point as Assistant Instructor of Cavalry Tactics, where he was promoted to first lieutenant on November 25, 1876.

In August 1878 he returned to Fort Reno shortly before the break-out resulting in the Northern Cheyenne Exodus. Wood was assigned command of a small detachment of Company G, 4th Cavalry and marched north to join the pursuit. His detachment of 20 troopers joined a mixed force of soldiers and cowboys searching for the Cheyenne. On September 21, 1878, at Little Sandy Creek near present-day Ashland, Kansas, Wood led his company in a mounted charge to rescue two wounded cowboys ambushed and trapped in a small canyon. His company became part of a mixed command of cavalry and infantry under Lieut. Col. William Lewis of the 19th Infantry Regiment that pursued and caught the Cheyenne in another canyon at Punished Woman's Fork, near present-day Scott City. Lewis attacked on the late afternoon of September 27, 1878, using dismounted cavalry including Wood's company in skirmish lines, and temporarily succeeded in pinning down the Cheyenne in the canyon. Lewis was mortally wounded by a sharpshooter during the engagement and the Cheyenne escaped after dark. For these engagements, Wood was brevetted for gallantry in action on February 27, 1890.

He returned with the detachment to Fort Reno in December 1878 and served with Company G until June 28, 1879. From July 9, 1879, to February 1, 1880, Wood served as regimental quartermaster at Fort Clark. The regiment relocated to Fort Garland, Colorado, in October 1879 in response to the "Meeker Massacre" bu Ute Indians, and in March 1880 returned to Fort Reno. In May, 1881, Wood's company was part of an expedition that moved the Uncompaghre Utes to the new Ouray Agency in Utah, and then continued to Arizona to quell an outbreak of hostilities with Apaches, before being posted to Fort Stanton, New Mexico, on November 17. He remained there until March 10, 1883, when he went on leave of absence.

For the next ten months Wood traveled to Europe, where he observed maneuvers of the French Army, and was promoted to captain on June 30, 1883, while in France. He returned to Fort Stanton on January 22, 1884. In May his troop marched to Fort Huachuca, Arizona, where Wood served as post commander and operated in the field against the Chiricahua Apaches. On July 31, 1886, he was posted to Fort Bowie, Arizona, with frequent duty in the field, until September 29, 1887. In early 1887, he married Minnie M. Mansfield in Chicago, Illinois. Her sister was the wife of infantry officer William S. Worth. His troop returned to Fort Huachuca, where it was stationed until May 1890, with Wood taking extended leave for illness for four months in 1888. In the autumn of 1889 the entire regiment assembled at Fort Grant for a camp of instruction and field maneuvers.

In May 1890, Wood's battalion of the 4th Cavalry transferred to the Department of California, stationed at the Presidio of San Francisco.

== Yosemite National Park ==
On October 1, 1890, President Benjamin Harrison signed into law the legislation creating Yosemite National Park. The act did not provide for management or protection of the park from trespassers, in particular game poachers and lumbermen. However a precedent for detailing Army troops to meet these concerns had been established when Congress had authorized the use of troops to protect Yellowstone National Park in 1883. United States Secretary of the Interior John W. Noble requested Harrison to provide troops "to prevent timber cutting, sheep herding, trespassing, or spoliation in particular." On April 6, 1891, the commanding general of the Department of California detailed Troop I, 4th Cavalry to protect the park.

The nature of Yosemite meant that the duties and problems of the 4th Cavalry would be different from those encountered in Yellowstone. Big game animals were not present in numbers to attract poachers, nor were there geysers or other fragile formations that careless tourists might "spoil". Yosemite's ancient forests were threatened, however, and game could thrive if the area was protected. The boundaries of the Parks were not marked, and roads into and through the park were virtually nonexistent. Wood marched the troop 250 miles from the Presidio to Yosemite and arrived May 19, 1891, becoming the first Acting Superintendent of Yosemite National Park. He established Camp Wawona at the southern edge of the park a mile west of Wawona, California, which was to be used between May and October each year by troops patrolling the park to prevent trespassing by commercial interests (primarily timber cutters), game poachers, and stockmen, particularly sheepherders.

After posting notices, Wood arrested and evicted trespassers from the park, but this tactic largely failed to deter sheepherders when the United States Attorney for the Northern District of California publicly declared that he would not prosecute violators. Wood's company was detailed to Camp Wawona in both 1892 and 1893, and during these seasons he altered his tactics to those which had proved effective in Yellowstone. Wood's troops arrested the sheepherders to separate them from their flocks, evicting them and dispersing their herds outside park boundaries on the opposite side of the park. The process of recovering their dispersed herds was time-consuming and uneconomical to the trespassers, and the problem of overgrazing in the park was brought under control until the sheepherders devised counter tactics after 1895.

Wood died at the Presidio, San Francisco, California on April 14, 1894, at the age of forty-nine, following surgery to remove cancerous tumors of the tongue and throat attributed to his fondness for smoking. He was buried with full military honors at San Francisco National Cemetery two days later. A squadron of twenty 4th Cavalry troopers made a 23-hour 94-mile forced march from Gilroy, California to act as his honor guard. On July 21, 1896, his widow married artillery officer William H. Coffin (USMA 1873) in San Francisco.

== Legacy ==
Camp Wawona was renamed Camp A. E. Wood in his honor by Captain George H. G. Gale (USMA 1879) of the 4th Cavalry, who succeeded Wood as Acting Superintendent, and remained as park headquarters until 1906, when the Yosemite Valley was re-ceded to the U.S. government and the camp moved there. Mount Wood (12,657 ft), just outside the park in Mono County, California, was named in his honor in 1894 by Lieutenant Nathaniel F. McClure (USMA 1887), also of the 4th Cavalry.
