= Knowles, California =

Unincorporated community in California, United States

Knowles
- Unincorporated community
- Location in California Knowles (the United States)
- Coordinates: 37°13′12″N 119°52′27″W
- Country: United States
- State: California
- County: Madera
- Elevation: 928 ft (283 m)

Knowles (formerly Dusy's Rock Pile) is an unincorporated community in Madera County, California, United States. It is located 2 miles (3.2 km) east of Raymond, at an elevation of 928 feet (283 m).

A post office operated at Knowles from 1902 to 1955. The name honors F. E. Knowles, owner of a local granite quarry. Knowles was a thriving granite quarrying community in the early 1900s, with a hotel, saloons, and a railroad stop, but by 1963 the town was described as a "ghost community". A granite quarry remains at the site today, although little else remains of the town.
