= St. Anthony Mary Claret Catholic Church =

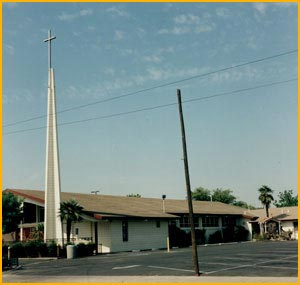

St. Anthony Claret Parish is a Catholic parish in southeastern Fresno, California, in the San Joaquin Valley of Central California.

The Claretian Missionaries began to minister to the Spanish- and English-speaking faithful in the suburban area of Fresno in 1951. During this year a temporary building was created that would eventually house the permanent building which now stands today. The church was the first to be named by the U.S. Claretians. Over time improvements were made and a site was purchased that would eventually house a permanent parish.

The parish is part of the official Roman Catholic Diocese of Fresno but the parish priests are assigned and directed by the Claretian U.S.A.-Canada Province based in Chicago, IL.

The parish boasts a strong growing Hispanic community, under the current direction of Rev. Fr. Art Gramaje, CMF with assistance of associate pastors Rev. Fr. Brian Culley, CMF and Rev. Jose Marino Novoa, CMF.

== Priests who have served St. Anthony Claret Parish ==
- Rev. Ron Alves, CMF
- Rev. Cecil Barron, CMF
- Rev. Robert J. Billett, CMF
- Rev. Brian Culley, CMF
- Rev. Tony Diaz, CMF
- Rev. Dennis Gallo, CMF
- Rev. Art Gramaje, CMF
- Rev. Fred H. Leclaire, CMF
- Rev. Henry J. Luna, CMF
- Rev. Darrin Merlino, CMF
- Rev. Quyen Nguyen, CMF
- Rev. Anthony Okolo, CMF
- Rev. Valentín Rámon, CMF
- Rev. José Sánchez, CMF
- Rev. Rosendo Urrabazo, CMF
- Rev. Fernando Vega, CMF
