= Raymond, California =

Unincorporated community in California, United States

Raymond Wildcat Station (former name)
- Unincorporated community
- Location in California Raymond (the United States)
- Coordinates: 37°13′02″N 119°54′20″W
- Country: United States
- State: California
- County: Madera
- Elevation: 948 ft (289 m)
- ZIP Code: 93653
- Area code: 559

Raymond (formerly Wildcat Station) is an unincorporated community in Madera County, California, United States. It is located 22 miles (35 km) north-northeast of Madera, at an elevation of 948 feet (289 m).

Raymond has fewer than 1,000 residents. It is located approximately 20 miles (32 km) north of Madera at Green Mountain Road and Road 600. The community is part of the Madera–Chowchilla Metropolitan Statistical Area. The ZIP Code is 93653. The community is served by area code 559.

== History ==
The area was named either for Israel Ward Raymond, a park commissioner who urged the preservation of Yosemite Valley, or for T. Raymond of Raymond & Whitcomb Travel Association in San Francisco, or for Walter Raymond of Raymond & Whitcomb Travel Association in Boston. Walter Raymond founded the Raymond Hotel in Pasadena in 1886. He planned the hotel and received money for its construction from his father Emmons Raymond, who was a stockholder in the Santa Fe Railroad. When the town of Raymond was dedicated, its residents approached Walter Raymond and offered to name the town after him if he would cut the ribbon at the ceremony.

The first post office opened in 1886. The original name, Wildcat Station, was replaced by Raymond when the San Joaquin Valley and Yosemite Railroad reached the town in 1886.

== Quarry ==
Raymond has a quarry for sierra white granite. This stone was used to face the Oakland California Temple.

== Notable people ==
- Thomas Hill (1829-1908), an early California artist. He died in Raymond, California.
- Lynn Herring (1958-), actress; best known for her long-running role of Lucy Coe on General Hospital.
- Wayne Northrop (1947-2024), actor; known for roles on Days of Our Lives and Port Charles
