= Vogelzang =

Origin
- Language: Dutch
- Region of origin: Netherlands

Other names
- Variant forms: Vogelsang, Vogelgesang

Vogelzang is a surname. Notable people with the surname include:

- Chris Vogelzang (born 1962), Dutch businessman
- Nicholas J. Vogelzang, medical oncologist
- Peter Vogelzang (born 1945), Dutch businessman
