= Vogelsang =

Vogelsang may refer to:

== Places ==
- Vogelsang, Brandenburg, a municipality in the Oder-Spree district, Brandenburg, Germany
- Vogelsang, Cologne, a city part of Ehrenfeld, Cologne, Germany
- Vogelsang, a hamlet in Elm, Switzerland
- Vogelsang, Zehdenick, one of the districts of the city of Zehdenick in Brandenburg, Germany
- Vogelsang (Bavarian Forest), a mountain in Germany
- Vogelsang, former name of Podlesí, now part of Kašperské Hory in the Czech Republic
- Vogelsang Pass, Sierra Nevada, California
- Vogelsang Peak, Yosemite National Park, California

== People with the surname ==
- Arthur Vogelsang (born 1942), American poet, teacher and editor
- Christoph Vogelsang (born 1985), German professional poker player
- Clifford J. Vogelsang (1892–1933), American lawyer and businessman
- Erika Vogelsang (born 1995), Dutch tennis player
- Fritz Vogelsang (born 1932), Swiss athlete who competed in the men's decathlon at the 1960 Summer Olympics
- Georg Vogelsang (1883–1952), German actor
- Karl Freiherr von Vogelsang (1818–1890), social reformer
- Ludwig von Vogelsang, Austrian general of the French Revolution and Napoleonic period
- Stefanie Vogelsang (born 1966), German politician
- Theo Vogelsang (born 1990), German footballer
- Willem Vogelsang (born 1956), deputy director of the International Institute for Asian Studies at the University of Leiden in the Netherlands

== See also ==
- Monika Vogelsang, a 1920 German silent historical drama film
- Ordensburg Vogelsang, a former Nazi elite school in Germany
- Vogelsang Airfield, an abandoned World War II military airfield in Germany
- Vogelsang High Sierra Camp, Sierra Nevada, California
- Vogelsang Military Training Area, Germany
- Vogelsang-Warsin, a municipality in Vorpommern-Greifswald district, Mecklenburg-Vorpommern, Germany
