= Nicholas J. Vogelzang =

American physician

- Born: December 13, 1949 (age 76); Holland, Michigan, U.S.
- Died: September 20, 2022 (aged 72); Las Vegas, Nevada, U.S.
- Education: University of Illinois School of Medicine
- Occupation: Oncologist
- Employer: Comprehensive Cancer Centers of Nevada
- Known for: Cancer research
- Board member of: Chair and medical director of the Developmental Therapeutics Committee and co-chair of the Genitourinary Committee for U.S. Oncology Research

Nicholas J. Vogelzang was a medical oncologist with Comprehensive Cancer Centers of Nevada (CCCN). He serves as medical director of the Research Executive Committee and Associate Chair of the Developmental Therapeutics and Genitourinary Committees for US Oncology Research. His research interests include clinical trials for genitourinary malignancies and mesothelioma.

== Career ==
Vogelzang joined Comprehensive Cancer Centers of Nevada in 2009 as a medical oncologist and serves as medical director of the Research Executive Committee and Associate Chair of the Developmental Therapeutics and Genitourinary Committees for US Oncology Research. Since 2004, he has been Head of the Genitourinary Oncology and Clinical Professor of Medicine for the University of Nevada School of Medicine in Las Vegas and Reno, Nevada.

He served as Director, Executive Vice President for Academic Affairs and Professor at Nevada Cancer Institute (NVCI) from 2004 to 2009.

During his tenure at the University of Chicago, he served as Professor of Medicine and Surgery (Urology) (1993 to 2003), Director for the University of Chicago's Cancer Research Center (1999–2003), and was named the first Fred C. Buffett Professor in Medicine and chair in Genitourinary Oncology (1999–2003).

Vogelzang received his M.D. from the University of Illinois at Chicago in 1974. He completed his internship, residency and chief residency in internal medicine at Rush-Presbyterian-St. Luke's Medical Center in Chicago, followed by his fellowship in medical oncology at the University of Minnesota in Minneapolis, Minnesota. Vogelzang became the first editor of the Textbook of Genitourinary Oncology and remains the lead editor today.

== Research ==
In 2002, Vogelzang directed the largest Phase II trial for mesothelioma using pemetrexed (brand name Alimta, by Eli Lilly). Pemetrexed is an antifolate, a class of drugs that targets the folic acid metabolic pathway. The results of the trial showed tumors shrank in 41 percent of patients on pemetrexed in combination with a more commonly used chemotherapy agent called cisplatin. Only 17 percent of patients receiving cisplatin alone experienced tumor shrinkage. Additionally, those on the pemetrexed combination lived nearly three months longer than those on cisplatin alone.

== Active research support ==
Vogelzang is actively involved in many research studies to test new therapies and treatments including:

- A double-blind, randomised, multiplied dose, Phase III, multicentre study of Alpharadin in the treatment of patients with symptomatic hormone refractory prostate cancer with skeletal metastases. The study began in October 2010 and is supported by Algeta USA.
- A Phase 3, Randomized, Double-blind, Placebo-Controlled Study of Abiraterone Acetate (CB7630) Plus Prednisone in Patients with Metastatic Castration-Resistant Prostate Cancer Who Have Failed Docetaxel-Based Chemotherapy. The study began in March 2010 and is supported by Cougar Biotechnology.
- A Phase 3, Randomized, Double-blind, Placebo-Controlled Study of Abiraterone Acetate (CB7630) Plus Prednisone in Asymptomatic or Mildly Symptomatic Patients with Metastatic Castration-Resistant Prostate Cancer. The study began in April 2009 and is supported by Cougar Biotechnology.
- A Registry of Sipuleucel-T Therapy in men with advanced prostate Cancer. The study began in June 2010 and is supported by Dendreon.
- A Phase 1/2., Open label, dose escalation, selected dose comparison trail of TOK-001 for the Treatment of Chemotherapy naïve castration resistant Prostate Cancer. The study began in September 2009 and is supported by Tokai.

== Professional memberships ==
Vogelzang served on committees for the American Society of Clinical Oncology (ASCO), as well as its board of directors from 1993 to 1996, and is a former president of the Illinois Division of the American Cancer Society. Vogelzang was the principal investigator at the University of Chicago for Cancer and Leukemia Group B (CALGB) from 1988 to 1999, and chair of the CALGB Prostate Committee from 1993 to 1999.

He is a founding board member of the Mesothelioma Applied Research Foundation (MARF) and a member the American Association for Cancer Research, the American Urological Association, the Society of Urologic Oncology and the European Society for Medical Oncology. Vogelzang is the 2012 Chair for the American Society of Clinical Oncology's (ASCO) Cancer Communications Committee, the current Vice Chair of the GU Committee and a member of the GU Translational Medicine Intergroup Committee for Southwest Oncology Group. For more than ten years, Vogelzang has served on the Medical and Scientific Advisory Boards for Us TOO, a prostate cancer education and support network for persons affected by prostate cancer.

Vogelzang is also a current or past member of several medical societies including:

- American Association for Cancer Research (AACR)
- American College of Physicians (ACP)
- American Foundation for Urologic Disease
- American Society of Clinical Oncology (ASCO)
- American Urological Association (AUA)
- Chicago Urological Society (Honorary)
- Clark County Medical Society
- European Society for Medical Oncology (ESMO)
- International Association for the Study of Lung Cancer (IASLC)
- Kidney Cancer Association (KCA)
- Mesothelioma Applied Research Foundation (MARF)
- Nevada Oncology Society (NOS)
- Society of Urologic Oncology (SUO)
- Southwest Oncology Group

== Corporate relationships ==
Vogelzang is a corporate consultant for the following companies: Aveo Pharmaceuticals Inc., Celgene Corporation, Dendreon, Exelixis Inc., Novartis AG, OncoGeneX/Teva Pharmaceutical Industries Ltd., Veridex, and Viamet.

He is also a member of the speakers' bureaus for Caris Life Sciences, Dendreon, Eli Lilly and Company, Inc., Novartis AG, and Sanofi-Aventis U.S.

== Published works ==
- Roth, Bruce J; Krilov, Lada; Adams, Sylvia; Aghajanian, Carol A; Bach, Peter; Braiteh, Fadi; Brose, Marcia S; Ellis, Lee M; Erba, Harry; George, Daniel J; Gilbert, Mark R; Jacobson, Joseph O; Larsen, Eric C; Lichtman, Stuart M; Partridge, Ann H; Patel, Jyoti D; Quinn, David I; Robison, Leslie L; von Roenn, Jamie H; Samlowski, Wolfram; Schwartz, Gary K; Vogelzang, Nicholas J (2013). "Clinical Cancer Advances 2012: Annual Report on Progress Against Cancer from the American Society of Clinical Oncology". Journal of Clinical Oncology. 31 (1): 131–61. doi:10.1200/JCO.2012.47.1938. PMID 23213095.
- Sonpavde, Guru; Pond, Gregory R; Fougeray, Ronan; Toni Choueiri; Qu, Angela Q; Vaughn, David J; Niegisch, Guenter; Albers, Peter; James, Nicholas D; Wong, Yu-Ning; Ko, Yoo-Joung; Sridhar, Srikala S; Galsky, Matthew D; Petrylak, Daniel P; Vaishampayan, Ulka N; Khan, Awais; Vogelzang, Nicholas J; Beer, Tomasz M; Stadler, Walter M; O'Donnell, Peter H; Sternberg, Cora N; Rosenberg, Jonathan E; Bellmunt, Joaquim (2013). "Time from Prior Chemotherapy Enhances Prognostic Risk Grouping in the Second-line Setting of Advanced Urothelial Carcinoma: A Retrospective Analysis of Pooled, Prospective Phase 2 Trials". European Urology. 63 (4): 717–23. doi:10.1016/j.eururo.2012.11.042. PMC 4127896. PMID 23206856.
- Smith, David C; Smith, Matthew R; Sweeney, Christopher; Elfiky, Aymen A; Logothetis, Christopher; Corn, Paul G; Vogelzang, Nicholas J; Small, Eric J; Harzstark, Andrea L; Gordon, Michael S; Vaishampayan, Ulka N; Haas, Naomi B; Spira, Alexander I; Lara, Primo N; Lin, Chia-Chi; Srinivas, Sandy; Sella, Avishay; Schöffski, Patrick; Scheffold, Christian; Weitzman, Aaron L; Hussain, Maha (2013). "Cabozantinib in Patients with Advanced Prostate Cancer: Results of a Phase II Randomized Discontinuation Trial". Journal of Clinical Oncology. 31 (4): 412–9. doi:10.1200/JCO.2012.45.0494. PMC 4110249. PMID 23169517.
- Yuh, Bertram E; Ruel, Nora; Wilson, Timothy G; Vogelzang, Nicholas; Pal, Sumanta K (2013). "Pooled Analysis of Clinical Outcomes with Neoadjuvant Cisplatin and Gemcitabine Chemotherapy for Muscle Invasive Bladder Cancer". The Journal of Urology. 189 (5): 1682–6. doi:10.1016/j.juro.2012.10.120. PMC 3926865. PMID 23123547.
- Dreicer, Robert; Garcia, Jorge; Rini, Brian; Vogelzang, Nicholas; Srinivas, Sandy; Somer, Bradley; Shi, Peipei; Kania, Marek; Raghavan, Derek (2013). "A randomized, double-blind, placebo-controlled, Phase II study with and without enzastaurin in combination with docetaxel-based chemotherapy in patients with castration-resistant metastatic prostate cancer". Investigational New Drugs. 31 (4): 1044–50. doi:10.1007/s10637-013-9940-0. PMID 23435622. S2CID 21363127.
- Jonasch, Eric; Signorovitch, James E; Lin, Peggy L; Liu, Zhimei; Culver, Ken; Pal, Sumanta K; Scott, Jeffrey A; Vogelzang, Nicholas J (2014). "Treatment patterns in metastatic renal cell carcinoma: A retrospective review of medical records from US community oncology practices". Current Medical Research and Opinion. 30 (10): 2041–50. doi:10.1185/03007995.2014.938730. PMID 24983741. S2CID 206968300.
- Fizazi, Karim; Scher, Howard I; Molina, Arturo; Logothetis, Christopher J; Chi, Kim N; Jones, Robert J; Staffurth, John N; North, Scott; Vogelzang, Nicholas J; Saad, Fred; Mainwaring, Paul; Harland, Stephen; Goodman, Oscar B; Sternberg, Cora N; Li, Jin Hui; Kheoh, Thian; Haqq, Christopher M; De Bono, Johann S (2012). "Abiraterone acetate for treatment of metastatic castration-resistant prostate cancer: Final overall survival analysis of the COU-AA-301 randomised, double-blind, placebo-controlled phase 3 study". The Lancet Oncology. 13 (10): 983–92. doi:10.1016/S1470-2045(12)70379-0. PMID 22995653.
- Vogelzang, Nicholas J; Bhor, Menaka; Liu, Zhimei; Dhanda, Rahul; Hutson, Thomas E (2013). "Everolimus vs. Temsirolimus for Advanced Renal Cell Carcinoma: Use and Use of Resources in the US Oncology Network". Clinical Genitourinary Cancer. 11 (2): 115–20. doi:10.1016/j.clgc.2012.09.008. PMID 23063578.
- Hong, David S; Gordon, Michael S; Samlowski, Wolfram E; Kurzrock, Razelle; Tannir, Nizar; Friedland, David; Mendelson, David S; Vogelzang, Nicholas J; Rasmussen, Erik; Wu, Benjamin M; Bass, Michael B; Zhong, Zhandong D; Friberg, Gregory; Appleman, Leonard J (2014). "A Phase I, Open-Label Study of Trebananib Combined with Sorafenib or Sunitinib in Patients with Advanced Renal Cell Carcinoma". Clinical Genitourinary Cancer. 12 (3): 167–177.e2. doi:10.1016/j.clgc.2013.11.007. PMC 4754667. PMID 24365125.
- Falchook, Gerald S; Lewis, Karl D; Infante, Jeffrey R; Gordon, Michael S; Vogelzang, Nicholas J; Demarini, Douglas J; Sun, Peng; Moy, Christopher; Szabo, Stephen A; Roadcap, Lori T; Peddareddigari, Vijay GR; Lebowitz, Peter F; Le, Ngocdiep T; Burris, Howard A; Messersmith, Wells A; O'Dwyer, Peter J; Kim, Kevin B; Flaherty, Keith; Bendell, Johanna C; Gonzalez, Rene; Kurzrock, Razelle; Fecher, Leslie A (2012). "Activity of the oral MEK inhibitor trametinib in patients with advanced melanoma: A phase 1 dose-escalation trial". The Lancet Oncology. 13 (8): 782–9. doi:10.1016/S1470-2045(12)70269-3. PMC 4109286. PMID 22805292.
- Kindler, Hedy L; Karrison, Theodore G; Gandara, David R; Lu, Charles; Krug, Lee M; Stevenson, James P; Jänne, Pasi A; Quinn, David I; Koczywas, Marianna N; Brahmer, Julie R; Albain, Kathy S; Taber, David A; Armato, Samuel G; Vogelzang, Nicholas J; Chen, Helen X; Stadler, Walter M; Vokes, Everett E (2012). "Multicenter, Double-Blind, Placebo-Controlled, Randomized Phase II Trial of Gemcitabine/Cisplatin Plus Bevacizumab or Placebo in Patients with Malignant Mesothelioma". Journal of Clinical Oncology. 30 (20): 2509–15. doi:10.1200/JCO.2011.41.5869. PMC 3397785. PMID 22665541.
- Dorff, Tanya B; Flaig, Thomas W; Tangen, Catherine M; Hussain, Maha HA; Swanson, Gregory P; Wood, David P; Sakr, Wael A; Dawson, Nancy A; Haas, Naomi B; Crawford, E David; Vogelzang, Nicholas J; Thompson, Ian M; Glode, L Michael (2011). "Adjuvant Androgen Deprivation for High-Risk Prostate Cancer After Radical Prostatectomy: SWOG S9921 Study". Journal of Clinical Oncology. 29 (15): 2040–5. doi:10.1200/JCO.2010.32.2776. PMC 3107759. PMID 21502546.
- Galsky, Matthew D; Hahn, Noah M; Rosenberg, Jonathan; Sonpavde, Guru; Hutson, Thomas; Oh, William K; Dreicer, Robert; Vogelzang, Nicholas; Sternberg, Cora N; Bajorin, Dean F; Bellmunt, Joaquim (2011). "Treatment of Patients with Metastatic Urothelial Cancer "Unfit" for Cisplatin-Based Chemotherapy". Journal of Clinical Oncology. 29 (17): 2432–8. doi:10.1200/JCO.2011.34.8433. PMID 21555688. S2CID 33263969.
- Smith, David C; Tangen, Cathy M; Van Veldhuizen, Peter J; Harrer, Grant W; Golshayan, Ali; Mills, Glenn M; Vogelzang, Nicholas J; Thompson, Ian M; Hussain, Maha HA (2011). "Phase II Evaluation of Early Oral Estramustine, Oral Etoposide, and Intravenous Paclitaxel Combined with Hormonal Therapy in Patients with High-risk Metastatic Prostate Adenocarcinoma: Southwest Oncology Group S0032". Urology. 77 (5): 1172–6. doi:10.1016/j.urology.2010.12.043. PMC 3528346. PMID 21334731.
- Shapiro, G. I; Tibes, R; Gordon, M. S; Wong, B. Y; Eder, J. P; Borad, M. J; Mendelson, D. S; Vogelzang, N. J; Bastos, B. R; Weiss, G. J; Fernandez, C; Sutherland, W; Sato, H; Pierceall, W. E; Weaver, D; Slough, S; Wasserman, E; Kufe, D. W; von Hoff, D; Kawabe, T; Sharma, S (2011). "Phase I Studies of CBP501, a G2 Checkpoint Abrogator, as Monotherapy and in Combination with Cisplatin in Patients with Advanced Solid Tumors". Clinical Cancer Research. 17 (10): 3431–42. doi:10.1158/1078-0432.CCR-10-2345. PMID 21220472.
- Agarwal, Neeraj; Vogelzang, Nicholas J (2011). "Secondary Hormonal Manipulations in the Treatment of Castration Refractory Prostate Cancer". BJU International. 108 (2): 227–8. doi:10.1111/j.1464-410X.2010.09970.x. PMID 21410863. S2CID 29367002.

== In the media ==
- Study May Alter Approach to Prostate Cancer The New York Times, June 1, 2014.
- Top Docs 2014 - Dr. Nicholas Vogelzang Vegas Seven, May 29, 2014.
- Is There A Link Between Prostate Cancer and Chronic Inflammation? Forbes, April 21, 2014.
- The Doctor Will "Like" You Now Desert Companion, August 2013.
- Antiangiogenic Agents, Chemotherapy, and the Treatment of Metastatic Transitional Cell Carcinoma Journal of Clinical Oncology, January 22, 2013.
- A Man of Many Battles: Genitourinary Expert Spurs Advances Amid Challenges onclive.com, November 12, 2012.
- Enzalutamide — A Major Advance in the Treatment of Metastatic Prostate Cancer The New England Journal of Medicine, September 27, 2012.
- Another chance for Las Vegas man to fight off cancer Las Vegas Review-Journal, July 16, 2012.
- Event seeks to raise awareness for prostate cancer Las Vegas Review-Journal, September 22, 2011.
- Clinical trials give cancer patients hope, time Las Vegas Review-Journal, January 29, 2011.
- Nicholas J. Vogelzang, MD, Receives Award From the Kidney Cancer Association. Medscape Today: Oncologists in the News, October 6, 2010.
- With Dr. Nicholas Vogelzang KSNV Ch.3, July 26, 2010.
- Patients from several states seek cancer treatment Las Vegas Review-Journal July 20, 2010.
- Cancer patients find new hope, FDA approves new but costly treatment for prostate cancer. Las Vegas Review-Journal July 16, 2010.
- Study: Cancer Patients at Higher Suicide Risk. Time Magazine, February 3, 2010

== Awards and honors ==
Vogelzang has been recognized for his work by many of the leading medical groups and research organizations in the United States. Some of his notable honors include:

- Member of the Board of Advisors, Johns Hopkins Greenberg Bladder Cancer Institute - 2014
- Named one of the "Top Doctors - Medical Oncology" in Vegas Seven - May 2014
- Laureate Award and medallion of The ACP Nevada Chapter - 2013
- Distinguished Physician of the year, The Nevada State Medical Association, 2013
- Named one of the "Best Physicians in Southern Nevada as chosen by their peers" in Desert Companion - August 2012
- Received Everyday Hero Award from American Red Cross Las Vegas - October 2011
- Named Healthcare Headliner by VEGAS Inc. magazine - October 2011
- Awarded Gold Certificate of Excellence by National Cancer Institute - October 2011
- Named Top Doctor by U.S. News & World Report - 2011
- Honored with a service award for his more than 10 years on the board of the Mesothelioma Applied Research Foundation - June 2011
- "Best Doctors in Las Vegas: Research" by Las Vegas Life - 2011
- Schonfeld Memorial Lecture, Kidney Cancer Association 20th Anniversary meeting - Chicago, October 2010
- Keynote Speaker, Japanese Society for Renal Cancer, 40th Anniversary - Tokyo, June 2010
