= Peter Vogel =

Peter Vogel may refer to:

- Peter Vogel (actor) (1937–1978), German actor, appeared in Holocaust miniseries
- Peter Vogel (cyclist) (1939–2021), Swiss cyclist
- Peter Vogel (footballer) (born 1952), German footballer
- Peter Vogel (banker) (born 1954), Polish murderer and later banker
- Peter Vogel (computer designer) (born 1954), Australian computer designer of Fairlight CMI
- Peter Vogel (artist) (1937–2017), German sound artist

== See also ==
- Peter Vogelzang (born 1945), Dutch businessman
