= Heather Von St. James =

American cancer survivor and research advocate (born 1969)

Heather Von St James
- Born: January 5, 1969 (age 57)
- Occupation: Blogger

Heather Von St. James (born January 5, 1969) is an American cancer survivor, cancer research advocate, and blogger. Von St. James serves as a mesothelioma research funding advocate and conference speaker for the Asbestos Disease Awareness Organization and Mesothelioma Applied Research Foundation.

Von St. James was diagnosed with malignant mesothelioma in 2005 at the age of 36. She received her diagnosis just after the birth of her first child, Lucious.

In February 2006, Von St. James underwent extensive thoracic surgery, known as extrapleural pneumonectomy, with adjuvant intra-operative heated chemotherapy under the care of thoracic surgeon Dr. David J. Sugarbaker at the Brigham and Women's Hospital in Boston, Massachusetts. She was declared cancer-free later that year.

Von St. James’ recovery from the disease is clinically unique because malignant mesothelioma is a rare, aggressive cancer typically diagnosed in older patients that, even with treatment, has a 6 to 9 month median survival rate. Mesothelioma, commonly caused by exposure to asbestos, typically only manifests after a 10-50 year period following exposure. Von St. James' was thinking back to her younger years looking for a cause and instantly thought about the years she spent with her father at his construction site. At these sites, her father would be covered in dust from dry-wall mud that contained asbestos. After finding the cause and getting the diagnosis she was told she only had 15 months to live, yet she is now cancer-free.
