= USS Vogelgesang =

USS Vogelgesang is a name used by more than one ship of the United States Navy, and may refer to:

- USS Vogelgesang (DE-284), a destroyer escort whose construction was cancelled in 1944 before completion
- USS Vogelgesang (DD-862), a destroyer in commission from 1945 to 1982
