= MARF =

MARF may refer to:

- Mesothelioma Applied Research Foundation
- Messaging Abuse Reporting Format WG, a working group of the Internet Engineering Task Force to standardize Abuse Reporting Format
- Modifications and Additions to a Reactor Facility, where the S7G reactor was tested
- Modular Audio Recognition Framework
- Multiple Arbitrary Function Generator in Buchla

Marf may refer to:

- Marf, a recurring character in Robot and Monster
- Martha Richler (born 1964), pen name Marf, an art historian and cartoonist
- Marife Yau, stage name Marf, a Hong Kong singer
