= Vogelgesang =

Vogelgesang may refer to:

- Rear Admiral Carl Theodore Vogelgesang (1869-1927), a United States Navy officer and Navy Cross recipient
- Sandra Louise Vogelgesang (b. 1942), a United States Foreign Service officer and U.S. State Department official
- USS Vogelgesang, the name of more than one United States Navy ship
- Vogelgesang (organ stop), bird-imitating organ stop.
