= Fletcher Peak =

Mountain in Yosemite National Park

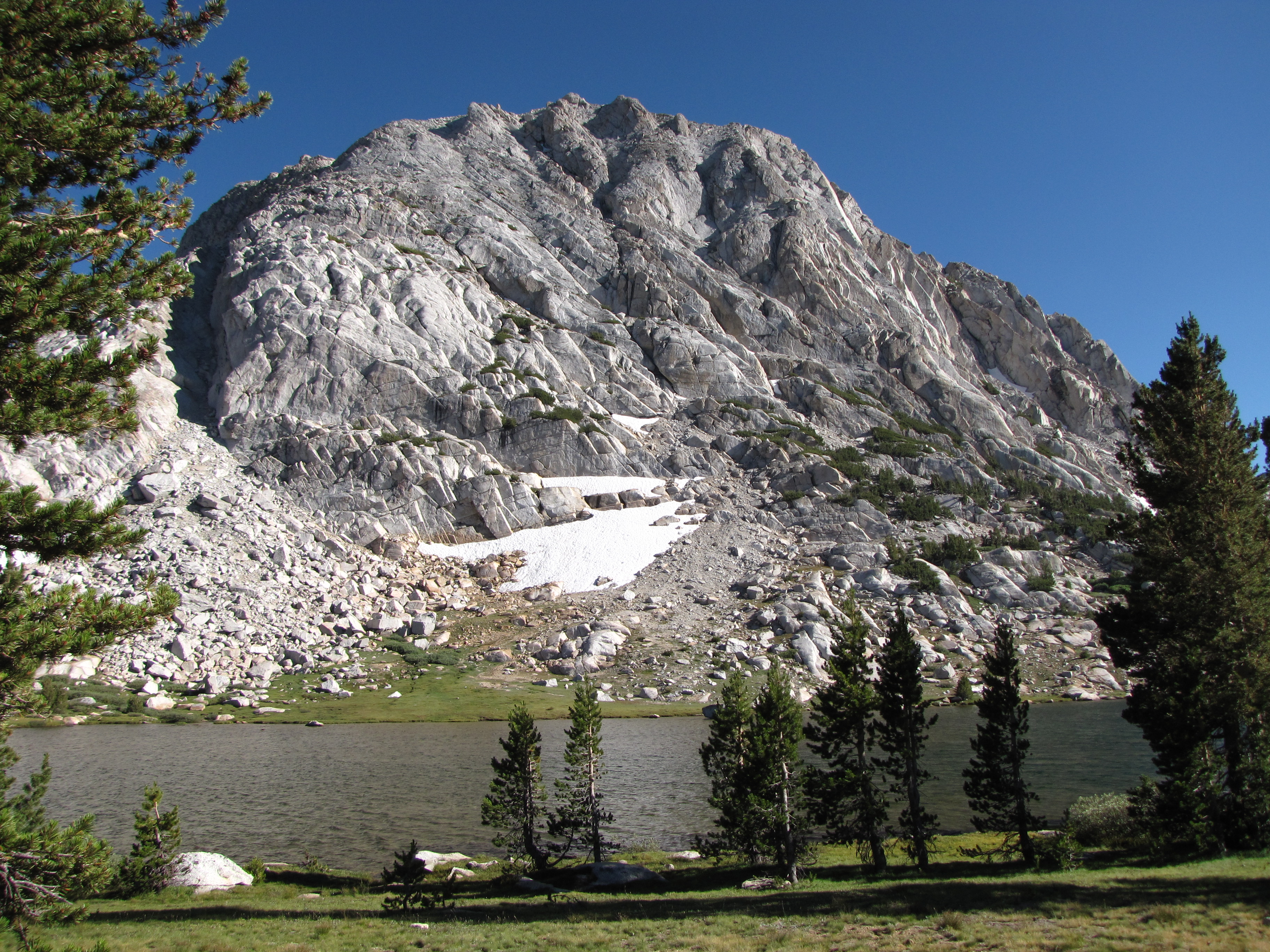
- Northwest aspect above Fletcher Lake

Highest point
- Elevation: 11,410 ft (3,478 m)
- Prominence: 130 ft (40 m)
- Parent peak: Vogelsang Peak (11,493 ft)
- Isolation: 1.28 mi (2.06 km)
- Coordinates: 37°47′30″N 119°20′09″W

Naming
- Etymology: Arthur G. Fletcher

Geography
- Location within California Location within the United States
- Location: Yosemite National Park; Mariposa County, California, U.S.
- Parent range: Cathedral Range, Sierra Nevada
- Topo map: USGS Vogelsang Peak

Geology
- Rock age: Cretaceous
- Mountain type: Fault block
- Rock type: Granodiorite

Climbing
- First ascent: Unknown
- Easiest route: class 2 Southwest slope

Fletcher Peak is an 11,410-foot-elevation (3,480-meter) mountain summit located in Yosemite National Park, in Mariposa County, California, United States. It is situated south of Tuolumne Meadows in the Cathedral Range which is a sub-range of the Sierra Nevada mountain range. The mountain rises one mile (1.6 km) south of Tuolumne Pass, 1.3 miles (2.1 km) northeast of proximate parent Vogelsang Peak and 1.8 miles (2.9 km) northwest of line parent Parsons Peak. Topographic relief is significant as the summit rises 1,250 feet (380 meters) above Fletcher Lake in 0.38 miles (0.61 km). Precipitation runoff from this landform drains south to the Merced River via Fletcher Creek.

== Etymology ==
Fletcher Creek and Fletcher Lake were named in 1895 by Lieutenant Nathaniel Fish McClure to honor Arthur G. Fletcher, deputy fish commissioner of California's State Board of Fish Commissioners, who directed the stocking of fish in the streams and lakes of Yosemite National Park. The peak was named in association, and this geographical feature's toponym was officially adopted in 1932 by the U.S. Board on Geographic Names. The landform had been named "Baker Peak" prior to the Fletcher name, for a Mr. Baker who was a cook at nearby Boothe Lake Camp.

== Climate ==
According to the Köppen climate classification system, Fletcher Peak is located in an alpine climate zone. Most weather fronts originate in the Pacific Ocean, and travel east toward the Sierra Nevada mountains. As fronts approach, they are forced upward by the peaks (orographic lift), causing them to drop their moisture in the form of rain or snowfall onto the range.

== See also ==
- Geology of the Yosemite area

== Gallery ==
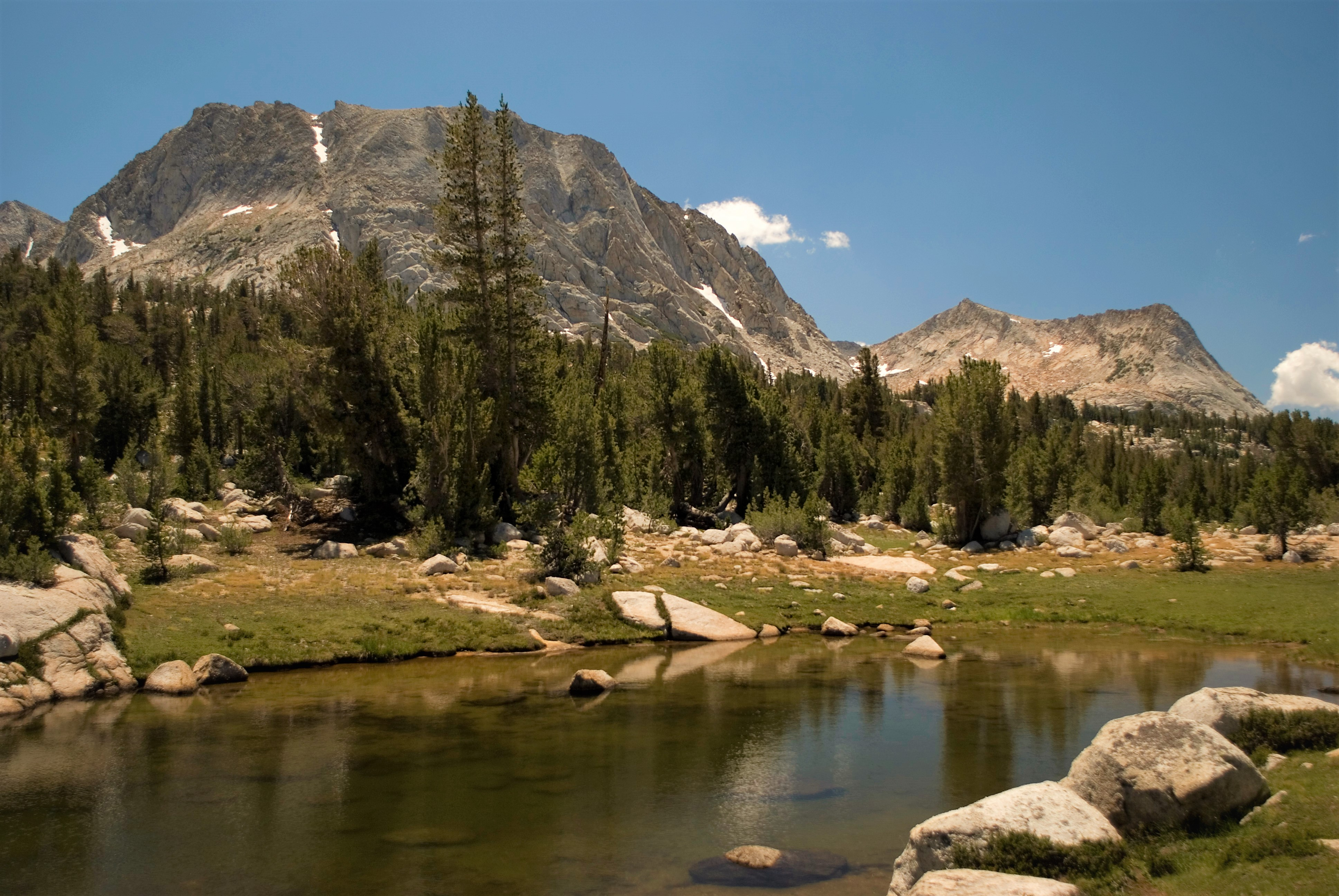
North aspects of Fletcher Peak (left) and Vogelsang Peak (right)

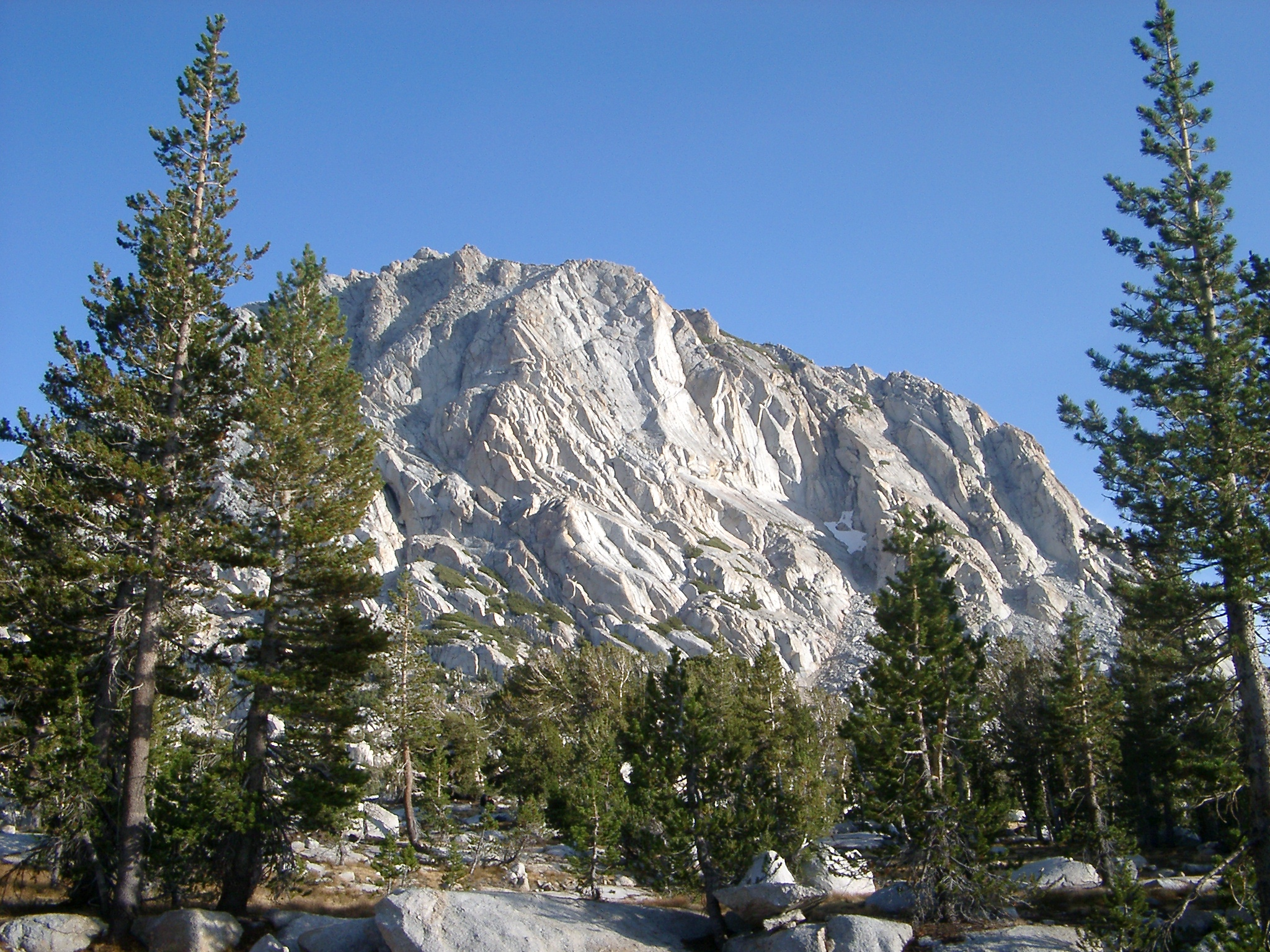

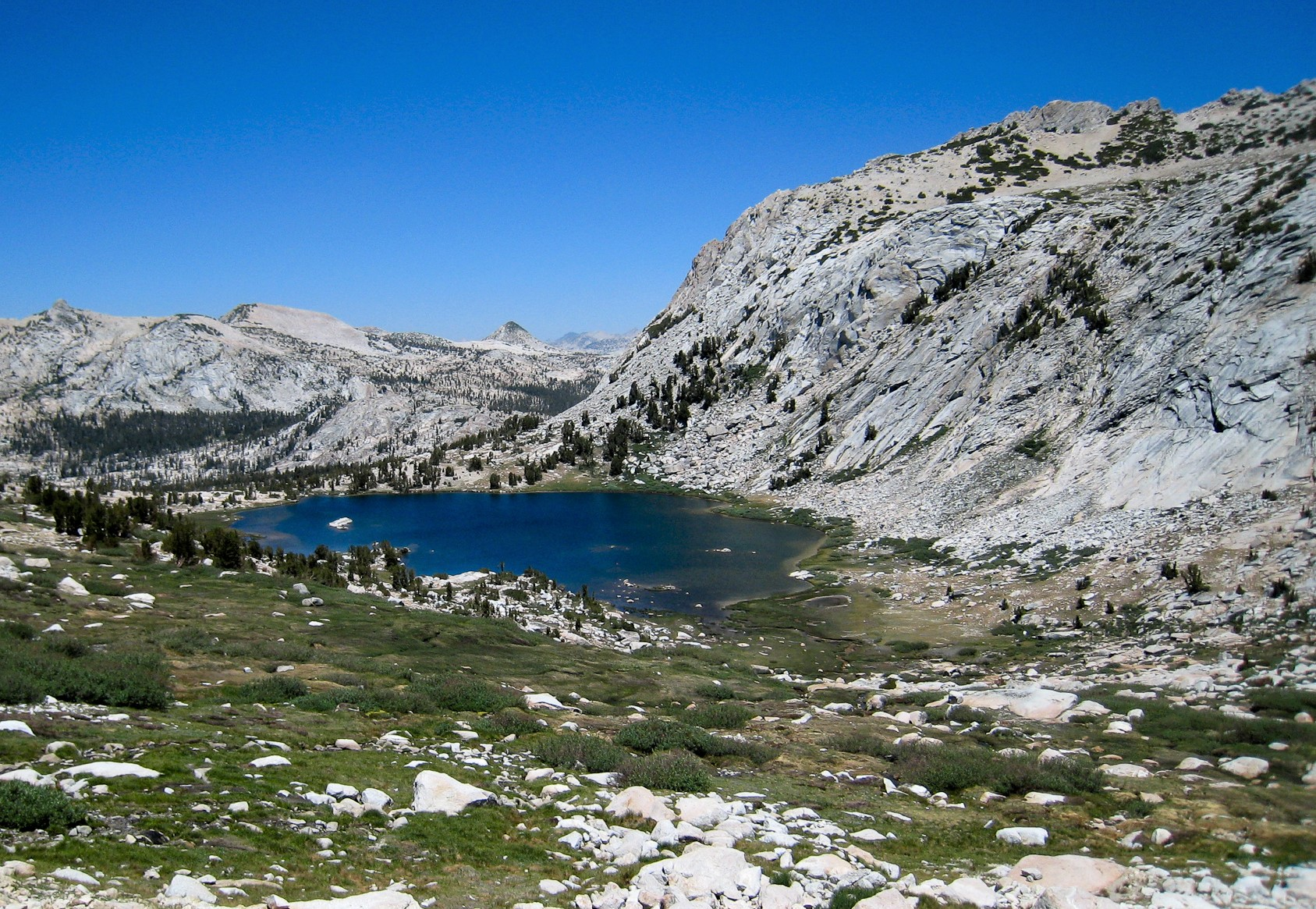
Southwest aspect of Fletcher Peak (right) above Vogelsang Lake

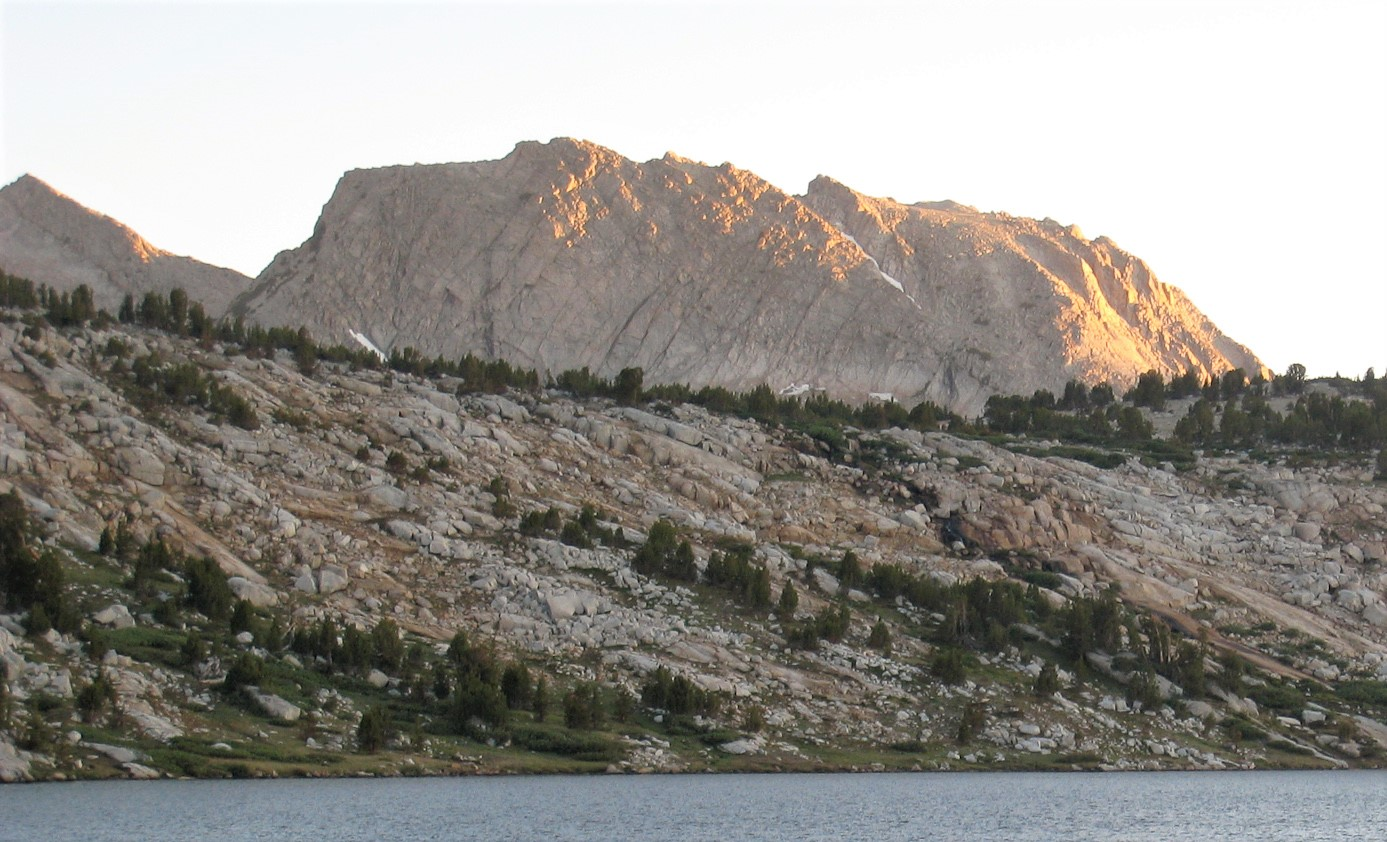
Northeast aspect seen from Evelyn Lake

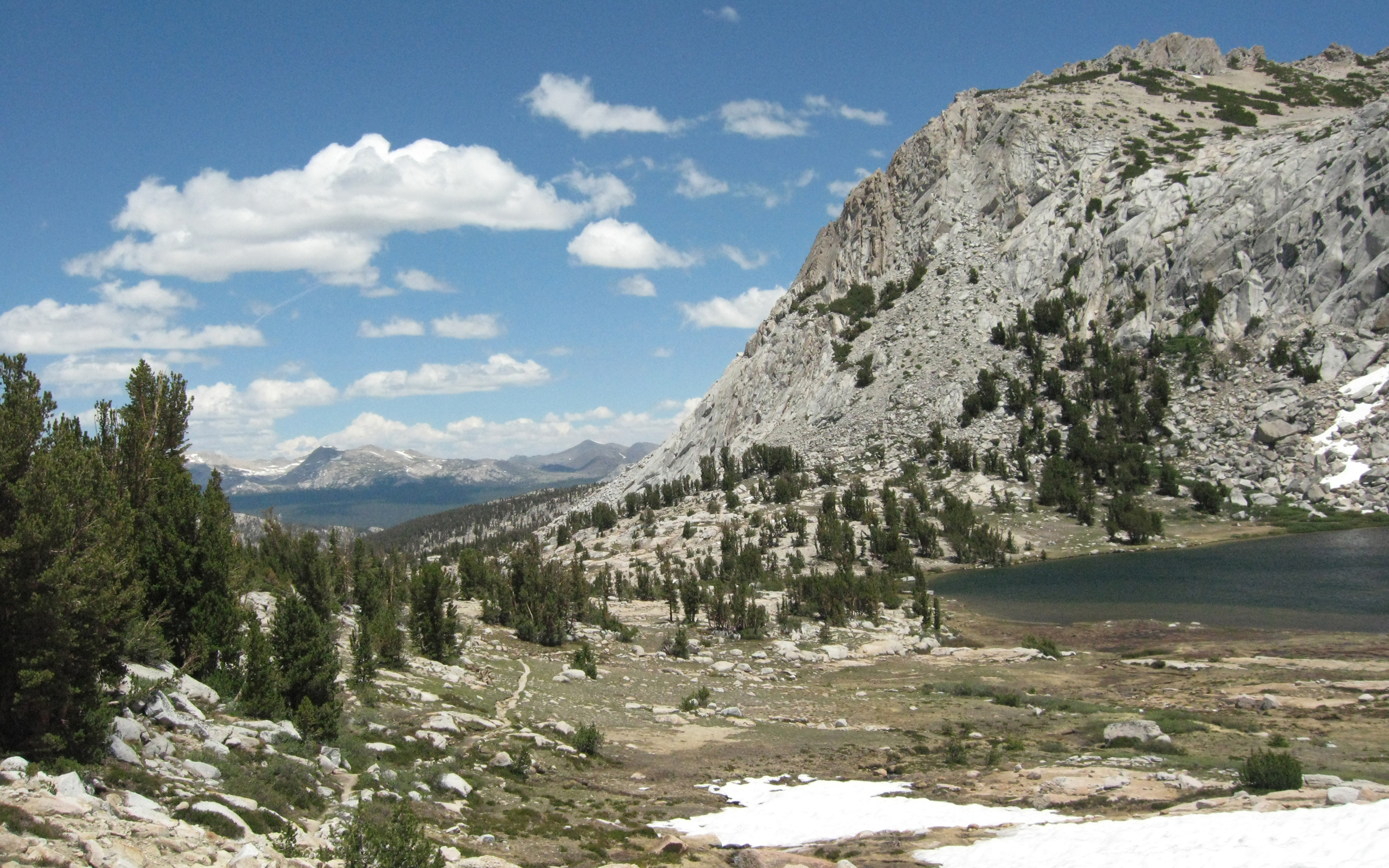
Southwest aspect of Fletcher Peak (right) with Vogelsang Lake

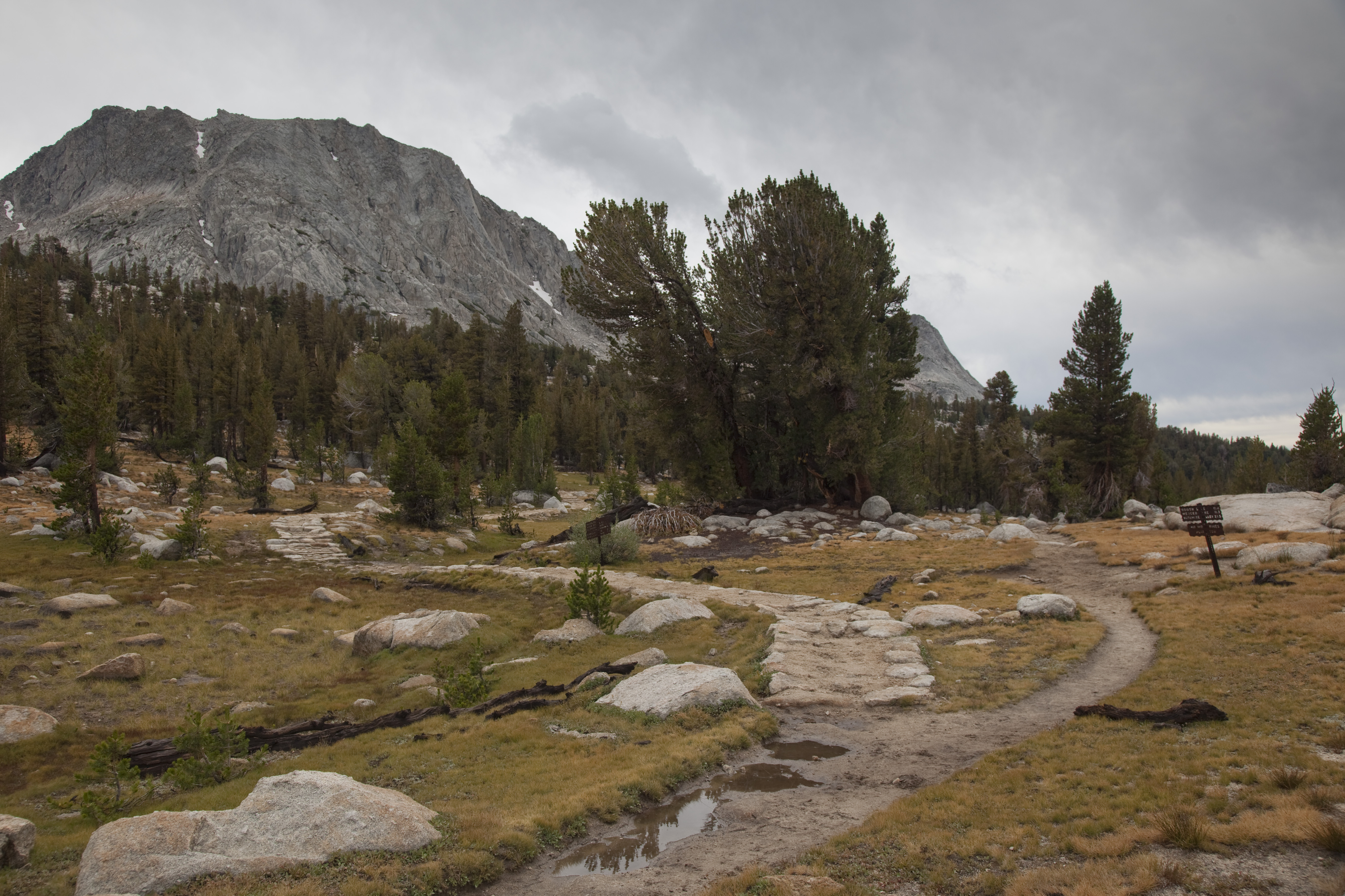
Fletcher Peak upper left

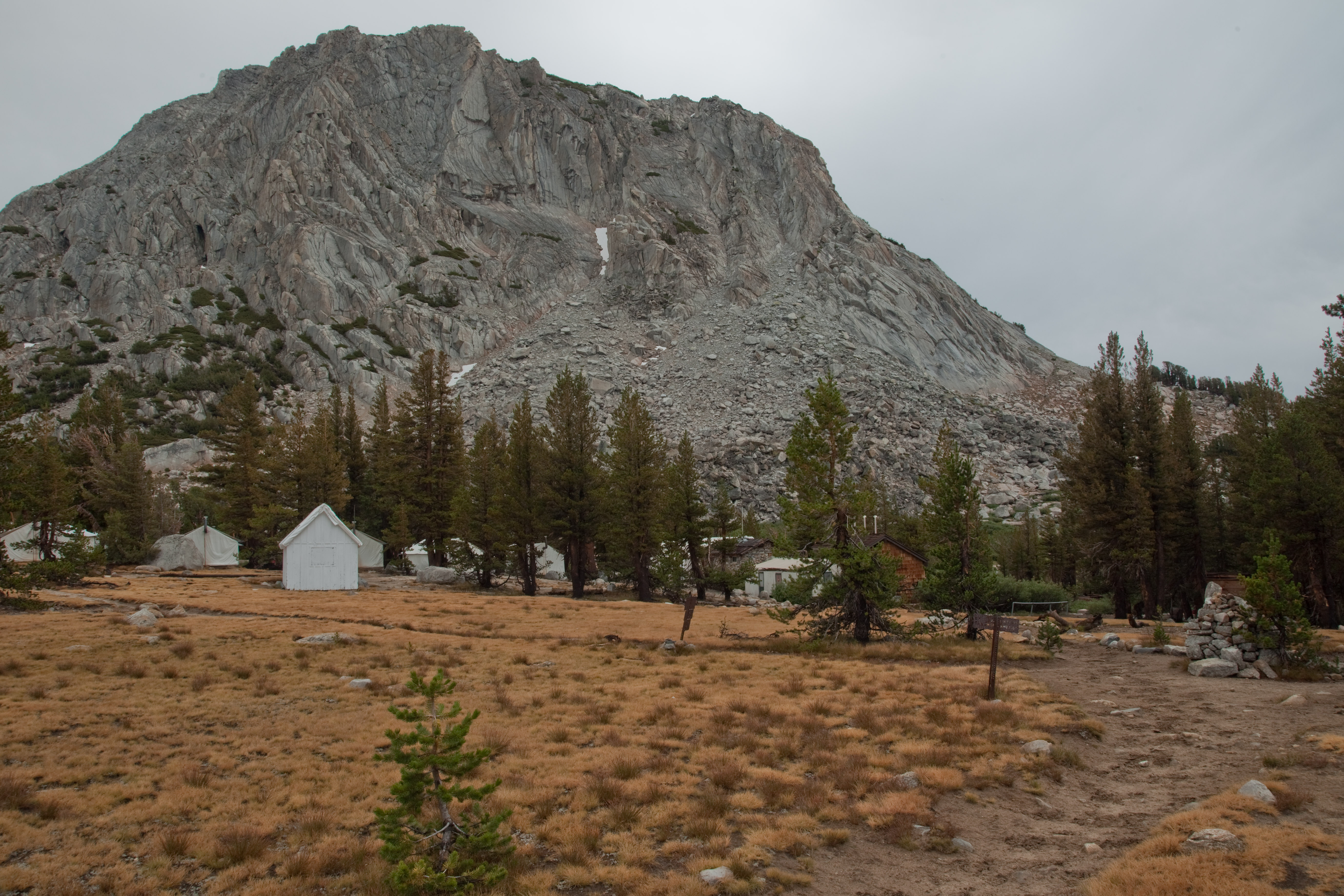
West aspect from Vogelsang High Sierra Camp
