= Vogelsang Pass =

Mountain pass in Yosemite National Park

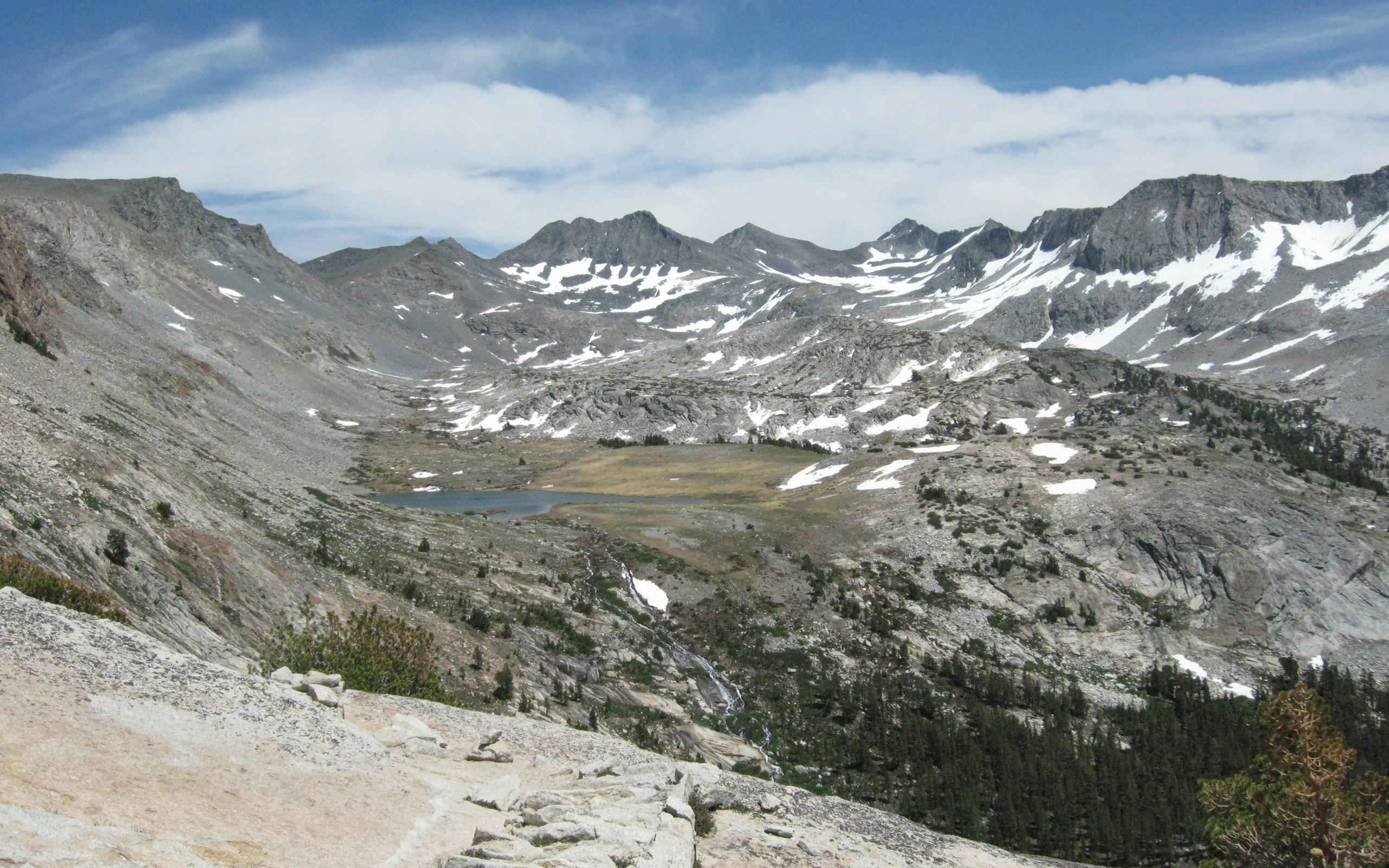
- View south from near pass
- Interactive map of Vogelsang Pass
- Elevation: 10,680 feet (3,260 m)
- Traversed by: Vogelsang Pass Trail

Third Approach
- Location: Mariposa County, California, United States
- Range: Cathedral Range
- Coordinates: 37°46′47″N 119°20′27″W
- Topo map: USGS Vogelsang Peak

Vogelsang Pass is a mountain pass in the Cathedral Range of Yosemite National Park, at 10,680 ft (3,260 m). It lies between the cirque containing Vogelsang Lake and the valley with Lewis Creek. The pass also lies on the ridge between Fletcher Peak (11,410 ft or 3,480 m) and Vogelsang Peak (11,498 ft or 3,505 m).

The pass was named by Colonel Harry Coupland Benson, the Superintendent of Yosemite National Park in 1907. It was named after either Alexander T. Vogelsang or his brother Charles Vogelsang, both of whom were on the California Fish and Game Commission. Alexander Vogelsang was subsequently the First Assistant United States Secretary of the Interior.

Vogelsang Pass, like the rest of the Cathedral Range, is formed out of Cathedral Peak Granodiorite, which was formed approximately 87 million years ago. Due to its elevation, Vogelsang Pass is in the alpine zone of the Sierra Nevada, where the growing season is too short and cold to support trees. There are many alpine flowers near the pass, including rock fringe (Epilobium obcordatum) and alpine willow (Salix arctica). Numerous marmots (Marmota flaviventris) also live near the pass.

Vogelsang High Sierra Camp is a common starting point for hiking to Vogelsang Pass. The pass is 1 mi (1.6 km) and 300 ft (90 m) of elevation above Vogelsang Lake. Many mountains can be seen from the pass, including the Clark Range, Bernice Lake, Parsons Peak, Simmons Peak, Mount Maclure, and Mount Florence. The view has been called "one of the most stunning views in Yosemite National Park" by the publisher of Sierra Rec magazine. The route from the pass to Vogelsang Peak is a class 2 scramble.
