= USS Vogelgesang (DE-284) =

History

United States
- Name: USS Vogelgesang
- Namesake: Rear Admiral Carl Theodore Vogelgesang (1869–1927), a U.S. Navy officer and Navy Cross recipient
- Builder: Charleston Navy Yard
- Laid down: 1943
- Launched: Never
- Fate: Construction contract cancelled 12 March 1944; scrapped incomplete

General characteristics
- Class & type: Rudderow destroyer escort
- Displacement: 1,450 tons (standard); 1,810 tons (full load)
- Length: 306 ft (93 m) overall; 300 ft (91 m) waterline
- Beam: 36 ft 10 in (11.23 m)
- Draft: 9 ft 8 in (2.95 m)
- Installed power: 12,000 shaft horsepower (16 megawatts)
- Propulsion: 2 CE boilers, General Electric turbines with electric drive, 2 screws
- Speed: 24 knots (44.5 kilometers per hour)
- Range: 5,050 nautical miles (9,353 kilometers) at 12 knots (22.25 kilometers per hour)
- Complement: 12 officers, 192 enlisted men
- Armament: 2 × 5-inch 38-cal (127-millimeter) (2×1); 4 × 40-mm (2×2); 10 × 20 mm (10×1); 3 × 21-inch torpedo tubes (1×3); 1 Hedgehog depth bomb thrower; 8 depth charge projectors (8×1); 2 depth charge racks

USS Vogelgesang (DE-284) was a proposed United States Navy Rudderow-class destroyer escort that was never completed.

Vogelgesang was laid down at the Charleston Navy Yard, sometime in 1943. The contract for her construction was cancelled on 12 March 1944 before she could be launched, and the incomplete ship was scrapped.

The name Vogelgesang was transferred to the destroyer USS Vogelgesang (DD-862).
