= Nevada State Medical Association =

American non-profit medical organization

The Nevada State Medical Association (NSMA) is the professional organization representing physicians in Nevada. Founded in 1875 and incorporated in 1904, the NSMA is a non-profit organization that consists of physicians, medical students, and residents. It is currently based in Reno, Nevada. The NSMA is the Nevada affiliate of the American Medical Association.

== History ==
Henry Bergstein, MD was elected to the Nevada Assembly in 1874, and sponsored a successful bill to regulate the practice of medicine in the state. The law passed in 1875, and it limited the practice of medicine and surgery to graduates of bona fide medical schools. The law required physicians to register with their county, and assigned a fine to those who were not in compliance. In 1875, Bergstein founded the Nevada State Medical Society (NSMS) in Virginia City, Nevada to enforce the new law. John W. Van Zant, MD was elected the first president. The Nevada Supreme Court upheld the law as constitutional, and in 1899, the Nevada State Board of Medical Examiners was created to supplant the enforcement role of the NSMS. The NSMS was incorporated in 1904 with the Nevada Secretary of State, and the first annual meeting of the reorganized NSMS was held in Reno on May 6, 1905. The Clark County Medical Society was granted a charter in 1930, and the White Pine County Medical Society held their first meeting in 1931. The name of the organization was changed to the Nevada State Medical Association to more accurately reflect that it is composed of many county societies.

== Leadership ==
- Tomas Hinojosa, MD, President
- Weldon D. Havins, MD, President-Elect
- Howard I. Baron, MD, Secretary
- Steven Parker, MD, Treasurer
- Mitchell D. Forman, DO, Immediate Past President
- G. Norman Christiensen, MD, Rural Representative
- Wayne C. Hardwick, MD, Chief AMA Delegate
- Florence Jameson, MD, AMA Delegate
- Peter R. Fenwick, MD, AMA Alternate Delegate
- Catherine O'Mara, JD, Executive Director

== County medical societies ==
- Carson Douglas County Medical Society
- Central Counties Medical Society
- Clark County Medical Society
- Elko County Medical Society
- Washoe County Medical Society
- White Pine County Medical Society
