= Carl Theodore Vogelgesang =

US Navy admiral (1869-1927)

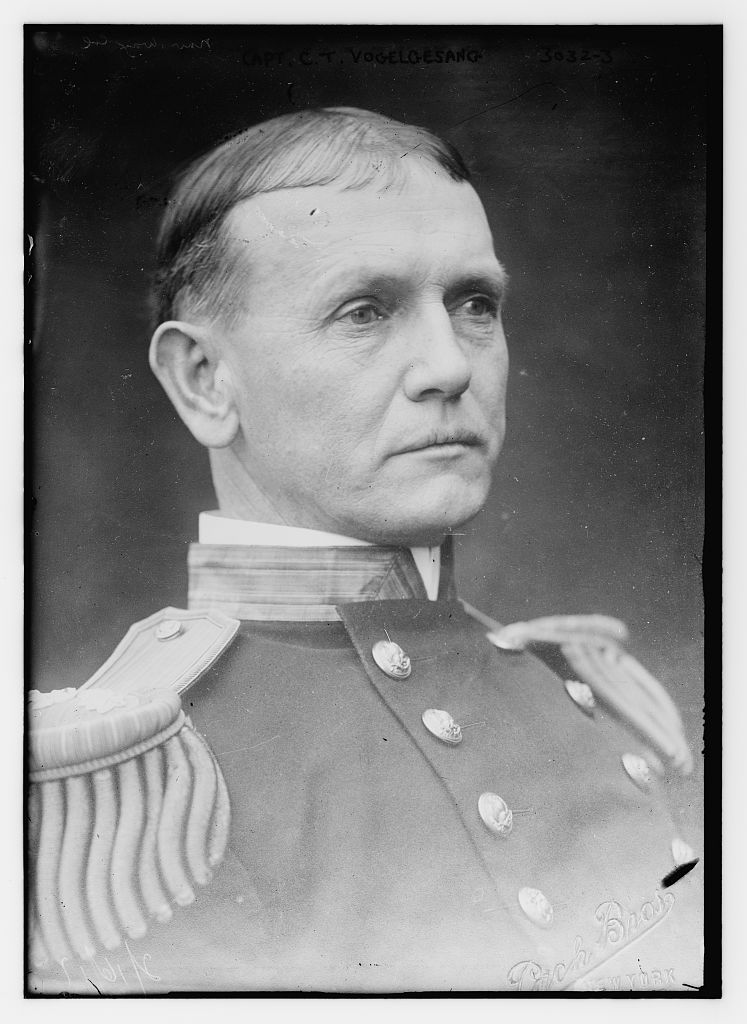
- Vogelgesang in 1915
- Born: January 11, 1869; North Branch, California
- Died: February 16, 1927 (aged 58); Washington, D.C.
- Burial place: Arlington National Cemetery, Arlington County, Virginia
- Military career
- Allegiance: United States of America
- Branch: United States Navy
- Service years: 1890–1927
- Rank: Rear Admiral
- Commands: USS Mayflower; USS Des Moines; United States Naval Mission to Brazil (twice); USS Idaho; 3rd Naval District; Battleship Division 2, Scouting Fleet; Light Cruiser Division, Scouting Fleet
- Conflicts: Spanish–American War; Philippine–American War; United States occupation of Veracruz; World War I
- Awards: Spanish Campaign Medal; Philippine Campaign Medal; Army of Cuban Pacification Medal; Mexican Service Medal; Navy Cross; World War I Victory Medal

Carl Theodore Vogelgesang (January 11, 1869 – February 16, 1927) was a United States Navy rear admiral and Navy Cross recipient. He was the first U.S. Navy flag officer from California.

== Early life ==
Vogelgesang was born at North Branch, California, on 11 January 1869, one of ten children (six boys and four girls) born to John Henry Vogelgesang and his wife, Anna Elizabeth (maiden name Vennigerholz). The youngest of the six sons, he received his education in the public schools of Stockton, California.

== United States Naval Academy ==
While in his senior year of high school he was given an opportunity to enter a competitive examination for entrance into the United States Naval Academy at Annapolis, Maryland. He won the appointment, and went on to Washington, D.C., where he was the protégé of Congressman James A. Louttit of Stockton. In order to reach Annapolis in time, he was granted his high school diploma in advance.

He passed the final examination at Annapolis in June 1886, was appointed a naval cadet—the term then applied to young men studying at the Naval Academy—on 6 September 1886, and graduated on 6 June 1890. Graduates at that time were given the privilege of remaining in the Navy or retiring. In answer to a letter asking his mother's advice, she said, "My son, as long as the government has given you your education, you should repay with your service". Vogelgesang followed her advice, and never regretted his decision.

== Marriage and family ==
On December 27, 1899, Vogelgesang married Zenaide Shepard, daughter of Admiral Edwin M. Shepard. Their children were a son, Shepard, and a daughter, Zenaide.

== Early service ==
Upon graduation from the Naval Academy, Vogelgesang began active duty as a passed naval cadet aboard the gunboat USS Alliance. At the completion of his requisite two years of sea duty before final graduation, he was commissioned as an ensign on 14 July 1892 to date from 1 July 1892.

Successive tours of duty on board screw sloop USS Adams and sloop of war USS Mohican occupied his time until 1895 when he was ordered to Washington, D.C., for duty in the Bureau of Navigation. Detached from that post on 29 August 1896, Ensign Vogelgesang reported to the gunboat USS Bancroft on 3 September 1896.

== Spanish–American and Philippine–American Wars ==
Bancroft remained Vogelgesang's home through the Spanish–American War of 1898. During that war, Vogelgesang served in her during convoy escort missions and on blockade duty off Havana, Cuba, and near the Isle of Pines. Vogelgesang received the Spanish Campaign Medal for this service.

A tour of duty in the stores ship USS Celtic followed during which Celtic supported operations in the Philippine–American War; Vogelgesang received the Philippine Campaign Medal in 1899 for this service.

== Peacetime service, 1900–1914 ==
He then served at the New York Navy Yard in Brooklyn, New York, in conjunction with the fitting out of battleships USS Kentucky (Battleship No. 6) and USS Wisconsin (Battleship No. 9) followed.

On 6 June 1904, Vogelgesang returned to the Bureau of Navigation for a two-year tour of duty, during which he attained the rank of lieutenant commander on 1 July 1905. A fifteen-month assignment as navigator on board battleship USS Louisiana (Battleship No. 19) followed from June 1906 to September 1907, during which he was awarded the Army of Cuban Pacification Medal in 1906. This was followed by his first command, the Presidential yacht USS Mayflower during the latter part of the administration of President Theodore Roosevelt.

That tour of duty ended in March 1908 when he transferred to the battleship USS Wisconsin as navigator. In May 1909, Lieutenant Commander Vogelgesang reported for duty ashore once more, this time to study at the Naval War College at Newport, Rhode Island. where he taught the Science of War. In this assignment he was instrumental in working out a course of study which was adopted and remains in use. On 2 May 1911, near the end of his assignment at the War College, Vogelgesang was promoted to full commander.

On 2 May 1912, Vogelgesang transferred to the battleship USS Wyoming (Battleship No. 32) to fit her out. When she was commissioned, he assumed duty as her executive officer.

== Veracruz ==
In late January 1914, Commander Vogelgesang was ordered to protected cruiser USS Des Moines (Cruiser No. 15) to serve as her commanding officer. During his tour aboard Des Moines, he was awarded the Mexican Campaign Medal for his service in quelling the uprising at Veracruz, Mexico, during the United States occupation of Veracruz. He commanded Des Moines until 23 October 1914.

== Naval War College, World War I, and Navy Cross ==
On 21 November 1914, Vogelgesang reported for duty at the Naval War College and remained there until the beginning of 1917, when he became chief of staff to the commander in chief, United States Asiatic Fleet. Just after assuming the duties of that office, he received his promotion to captain, to date from 29 August 1916. During his tour of duty with the Asiatic Fleet he received the Navy Cross, with the following citation: "For exceptionally meritorious service in duty of great responsibility as Chief of Staff to Commander-in-Chief, U. S. Asiatic Fleet."

In January 1918, Captain Vogelgesang relinquished his position as chief of staff to the commander in chief Asiatic Fleet, and reported to Rio de Janeiro, Brazil, as senior officer of the American naval commission. During his tour in Brazil, he worked with the Brazilian Naval College.

In 1919, Captain Vogelgesang received the World War I Victory Medal.

== Post-World War I service ==
On 9 January 1919, Captain Vogelgesang reported to the New York Shipbuilding Company as Naval Inspector of Machinery and took charge of the fitting out of battleship USS Idaho (Battleship No. 42) at Camden, New Jersey. He assumed command of Idaho when she was placed in commission on 24 March 1919. He commanded Idaho until June 1920 when he became the chief of staff to the Commander in Chief, United States Atlantic Fleet. In June 1921, Captain Vogelgesang became commandant, 3rd Naval District, at New York City, headquartered at the New York Navy Yard in Brooklyn.

== Naval Commissioner to Brazil ==
In 1922, the President of Brazil sent a request to President Warren G. Harding asking that Admiral Vogelgesang be detached from the 3rd Naval District and sent to Brazil to aid in the reconstruction and reorganization of the Brazilian Navy. At first the United States Government did not heed the request, because under Admiral Vogelgesang the New York Navy Yard had been free from strikes and had enjoyed its best financial status in years; consequently, the Governor of New York, senators, and other prominent New Yorkers protested that Rear Admiral Vogelgesang should be retained at the New York Navy Yard.

When a second Brazilian request came asking for Rear Admiral Vogelgesang along with a statement that if he could not be spared Brazil would have to make a selection from the British Royal Navy, the United States decided that the value of establishing a good relations with Brazil merited sending Vogelgesang there. Vogelgesang was ordered to form a commission, and, with 35 other selected U.S. Navy officers, proceeded to Rio de Janeiro. Having a basic knowledge of French and Spanish, he was able in six weeks' time to absorb the Portuguese language sufficiently to conduct his lectures to the Brazilian officers in their native tongue.

During his two years' service in Brazil as Naval Commissioner in the Diplomatic Service, he was instrumental in planting the first seeds of friendship between Brazil and the United States. As a mark of esteem for his excellent service, the Brazilian Government sent an envoy to place a commemorative plaque in the Mahan Library at the United States Naval Academy in his honor.

Early in his Brazilian assignment, Vogelgesang was promoted to rear admiral, to date from 16 October 1922, the first person from California to become a flag officer.

== Final years ==
Rear Admiral Vogelgesang completed his mission in Brazil in January 1925 and returned to the United States on 7 February 1925. He took up duties at OpNav at the Department of the Navy in Washington, D.C.

On 3 April 1925, he broke his flag in battleship USS New York (BB-34), meaning his flag was raised on this ship, and became Commander, Battleship Division 2 of the Scouting Fleet; one of his first duties during this tour was to command the 1925 Midshipman Summer Cruise, which took him to the Pacific. In June 1926, he was detached from command of Battleship Division 2 and took command of the Light Cruiser Division, Scouting Fleet, with light cruiser USS Trenton (CL-11) as his flagship.

== Death ==
Rear Admiral Vogelgeang's tour of duty in the Light Cruiser Division was abbreviated when he entered the Naval Hospital, Washington, D.C., for treatment of a kidney ailment. He died there on 16 February 1927.

Vogelgesang had so endeared himself to the Brazilian people that the entire Brazilian Legation was present at his burial services at Arlington National Cemetery in Arlington, Virginia. A year later, to commemorate the day, the Brazilian Legation once more gathered there.

== Namesakes ==
During World War II, the U.S. Navy destroyer escort USS Vogelgesang (DE-284) was named for Rear Admiral Vogelgesang. Her construction was canceled in March 1944 before she could be launched.

However, in New York City on 3 August 1944, work began at the Bethlehem Steel Corporation shipyard at Staten Island on a new destroyer, to which the name Vogelgesang had been transferred. She was christened USS Vogelgesang (DD-862) on 15 January 1945, by Vogelgesang's daughter Zenaide (by then Mrs. Walter Bradley of Whitefield, New Hampshire). The christening party also included his widow and daughter-in-law, Mrs. Shepard Vogelgesang, Mrs. Gregory Davison (his widow's sister), Mr. and Mrs. George Moulson (his widow's sister and brother in law), Specialist T 1/c Barbara Jane Sullivan, Lieutenant Bill Vogelgesang, USNR, and Lieutenant Commander Woodson P. Vogelgesang, USNR, the last three named being on active duty with the Navy in that area.

USS Vogelgesang was commissioned on 28 April 1945, and served in the U.S. Navy until decommissioned in 1982; she then served in the Mexican Navy from 1982 to 2002 under the name Quetzalcoatl, and finally was scuttled as an artificial reef in 2006.

== Military career ==
6 September 1886	Appointed as naval cadet, United States Naval Academy
6 June 1890	Graduated United States Naval Academy and began duty on board gunboat USS Alliance
1 July 1892	Promoted to ensign
1892–1895	Successive tours of duty on board screw sloop USSAdams and sloop of war USS Mohican
1895 – August 1896	Bureau of Navigation, Washington, D.C.
September 1896	Gunboat USS Bancroft
April–August 1898	Spanish–American War service aboard Bancroft.
3 March 1899	Promoted to lieutenant, junior grade
1899	Philippine–American War duty aboard stores ship USS Celtic
early 1900s	New York Navy Yard; fitting out of battleships USS Kentucky and USS Wisconsin
June 1904 – June 1906	Bureau of Navigation, Washington, DC
1 July 1905	Promoted to lieutenant commander
June 1906 – September 1907	Navigator on board battleship USS Louisiana; service in Cuba
September 1907 – March 1908	First command: commanding officer of Presidential yacht USS Mayflower
March 1908 – May 1909	Navigator on board battleship USS Wisconsin
May 1909 – May 1912	Student at Naval War College, Newport, Rhode Island
2 May 1911	Promoted to commander
2 May 1912	Transferred to battleship USS Wyoming to fit her out, followed by duty as executive officer of Wyoming.
January 1914 – October 1914	Commanded protected cruiser USS Des Moines; service in U.S. occupation of Veracruz
21 November 1914 – early 1917	Naval War College, Newport, Rhode Island
1917	Chief of staff to Commander in Chief, United States Asiatic Fleet. Promoted to captain, back-dated to 29 August 1916.
January 1918	Reported to Rio de Janeiro, Brazil, as senior officer of American naval commission
9 January 1919	Took charge of fitting out of battleship USS Idaho
24 March 1919	First commanding officer of USS Idaho
June 1920	Chief of Staff to the Commander in Chief, United States Atlantic Fleet
1921 – November 1922	Commandant, 3rd Naval District at New York City
November 1922	Received orders to organize and lead the U.S. Naval Mission to Brazil. For next two years, he and his staff joined their Brazilian counterparts in reorganizing the Brazilian Navy. Early in this assignment, promoted to rear admiral back-dated to 16 October 1922; first flag officer from California.
January 1925	Completed mission in Brazil and returned to the U.S. on February 7.
April 3, 1925	Became Commander, Battleship Division 2, Scouting Fleet; flagship was battleship USS New York (BB-34)
June 1926	Commander, Light Cruiser Division, Scouting Fleet.
16 February 1927	Died at Naval Hospital, Washington, D.C.
