= High Sierra Camps =

Rustic lodging facilities in the Sierra Nevada mountain range, U.S.

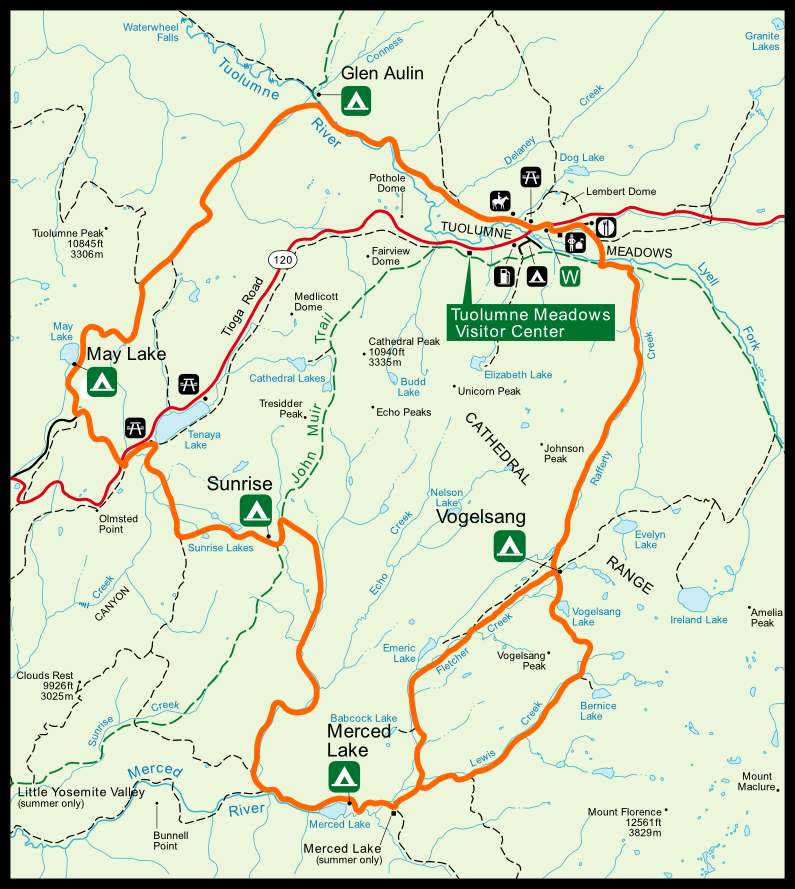
Map of the trails joining six of the High Sierra Camps in Yosemite National Park

The High Sierra Camps are nine rustic lodging facilities located in two national parks and a national monument in California's Sierra Nevada mountain range. Open most years from June or July to September, they are staffed camps with tent cabins and food service facilities. The backcountry camps receive their supplies by pack mules.

Seven camps are located in Yosemite National Park. Five of these camps are located off the road in the wilderness, and are accessible only by hiking or by horseback riding. There are two similar camps which can be reached by automobile, located near the Tioga Road.

Six of the camps are arranged along a loop trail 51.0 miles (82.1 km) long, and each camp can be reached in sequence in a one-day hike from the previous camp.

There are also two similar camps to the south of Yosemite, one each in Sequoia National Park and Giant Sequoia National Monument.

== History ==
In 1916, Stephen Mather of the National Park Service made an agreement with a private concessionaire, D. J. Desmond, to build mountain "chalets" at Tenaya Lake, Tuolumne Meadows and Merced Lake. Desmond's company went bankrupt during World War I, and these first camps closed in 1918. In 1923, the Park Service decided that the camps should be re-opened and expanded. Ranger and naturalist Carl Parcher Russell hiked through the region and selected locations for five more camps. Three of these were built the following year by a new concessionaire, the Yosemite National Park Company. That firm merged with the Curry Camping Company in 1925, forming the Yosemite Park and Curry Company, which ran the camps for many years under the management of Donald Tresidder, until his death in 1948.

Ansel Adams defended the High Sierra Camps against critics who saw them as an encroachment into the wilderness: "The present High Sierra Camps do not, in my opinion, violate wilderness qualities as they now exist. I personally feel that a High Sierra Camp near the north rim of the Yosemite Valley would be a logical link in the chain." A camp on the north rim was never built.

In the early years, rates were $1.00 per night and $1.00 per meal. In 1938, all-inclusive six-day horseback trips cost $46.00 per person. The rates for 2011 are $151.00 per person per day for lodging, breakfast and dinner, and $15.25 for lunch. Camps without showers charge $6.00 less per day. Six day saddle trips are $1603.00. The Yosemite Park and Curry Company operated the High Sierra Camps. YP&CC remained a Curry Family controlled corporation until the death of Mary Curry Tressider in 1970. After several ownership changes, MCA, Inc. took control of YP&CC in 1973, operating the concession until the NPS awarded a new contract to Delaware North Company in 1993. which has operated the concession ever since, and manages all of the camps except the Sequoia High Sierra Camp. Demand for reservations at the Yosemite backcountry camps is very high, and a lottery is conducted for reservations, with applications being accepted from September 1 to November 1 of the previous year for reservations the following summer.

== The five backcountry camps ==
These camps, in conjunction with Tuolumne Meadows Lodge, make it possible to "backpack for six days without carrying a backpack. You can carry a day pack and spend each night at one of the High Sierra camps, complete with bedding and meals". These camps provide "a fantastic way for visitors who enjoy a warm bed, a hot shower and a hearty meal to enjoy the beauty of the backcountry." The complete loop, which offers a "maximum in scenic beauty", has a hiking length, without side trips, estimated at 51.0 miles (82.1 km).

=== May Lake High Sierra Camp ===
The May Lake High Sierra Camp replaced an earlier camp at Tenaya Lake, and was established in July 1938 at a site selected by Donald Tresidder and Mary Curry Tresidder of the Yosemite Park and Curry Company. It is located at an elevation of 9,270 feet (2,830 m). The camp can accommodate 36 overnight guests.

It is the backcountry camp closest to a road, and is accessible by an uphill hike of 1.2 miles (1.9 km) from the parking area. Glen Aulin High Sierra Camp is located a hiking distance of 8.6 miles (13.8 km) northeast, and Sunrise High Sierra Camp is located a hiking distance of 8.3 miles (13.4 km) southeast.

Mount Hoffmann, named for topographer Charles F. Hoffmann of the California Geological Survey, is located just across May Lake, which is named for the woman Hoffman married, Lucy Mayotta Brown. Tenaya Peak is also nearby.

=== Glen Aulin High Sierra Camp ===
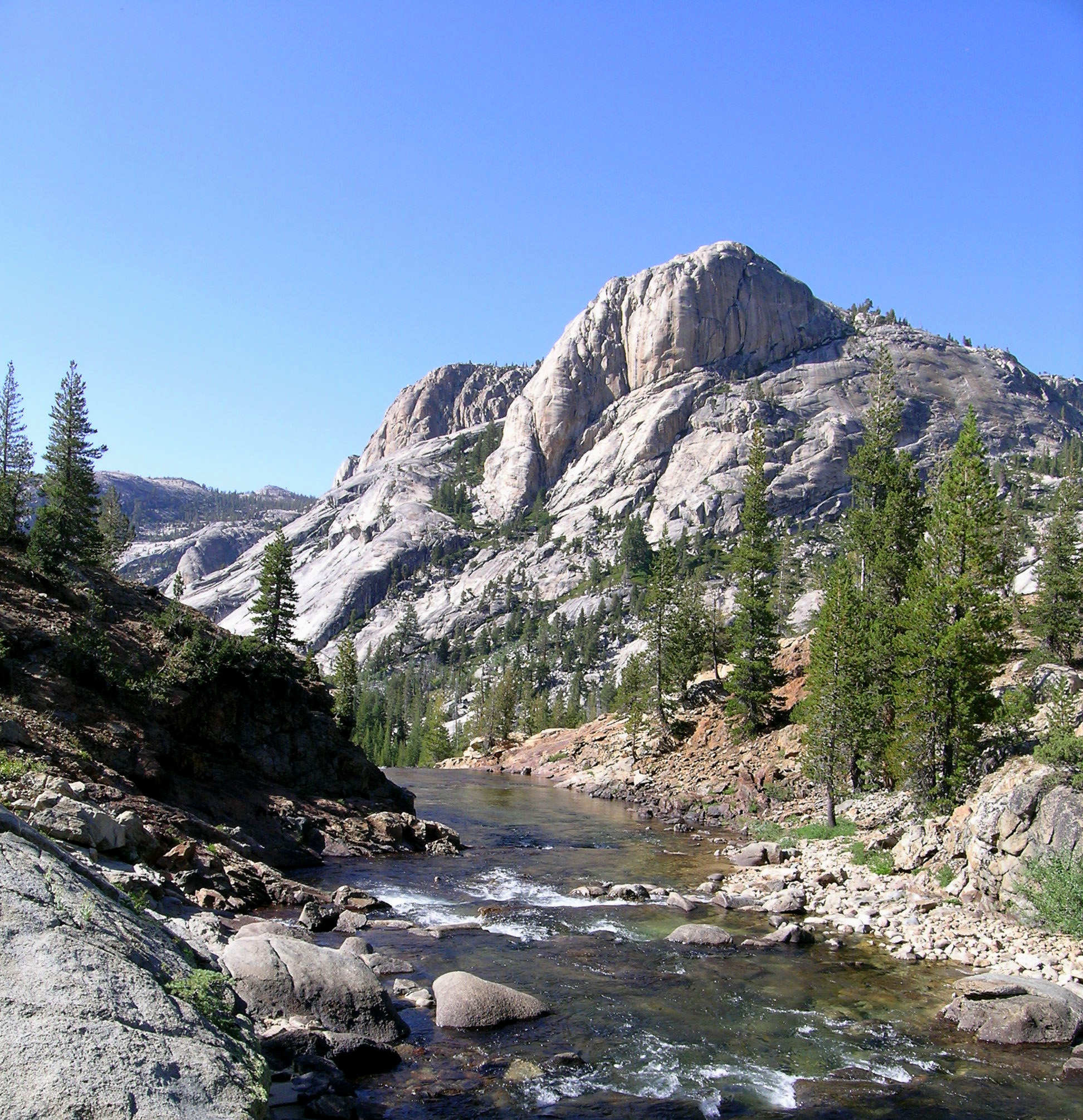
The trail to the Glen Aulin High Sierra Camp

The Glen Aulin High Sierra Camp is located on the Tuolumne River at an elevation of 7,800 feet (2,400 m), and was one of the original camps established in 1923. However, the camp was relocated in 1927 a small distance upriver, because the original site had a mosquito problem early in the season. The current site is "graced by a superb waterfall and the lucent pool into which it spills."

Downstream on the Tuolumne River are three more spectacular waterfalls, Waterwheel Falls, California Falls, and Le Conte Falls.

The May Lake High Sierra Camp is a hiking distance of 8.6 miles (13.8 km) southwest, and Tuolumne Meadows Lodge is a hiking distance of 7.6 miles (12.2 km) southeast.

=== Vogelsang High Sierra Camp ===
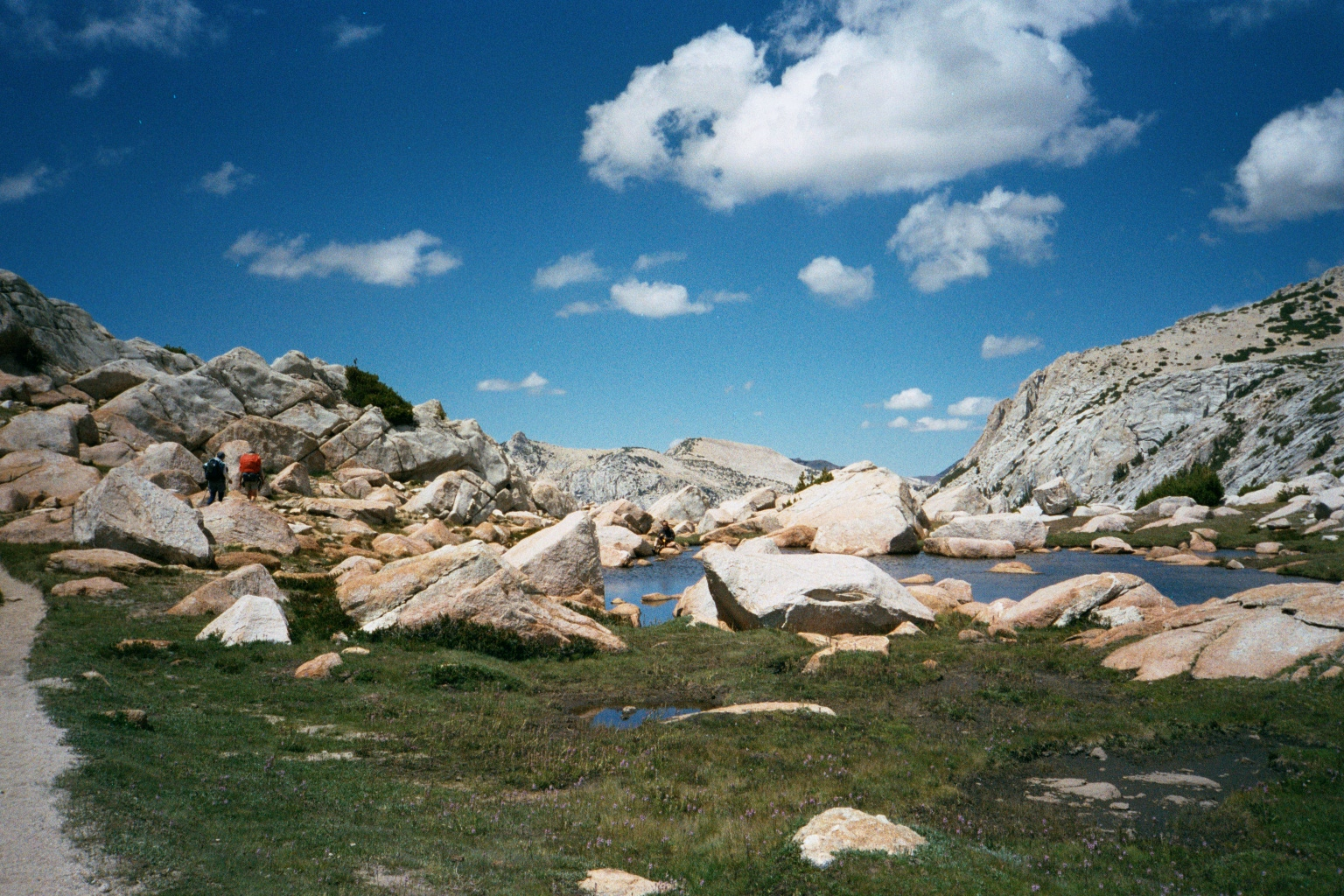
Vogelsang Pass is the highest point on the loop trail connecting six of the High Sierra Camps.

The Vogelsang High Sierra Camp is the highest elevation camp, located at 10,300 feet (3,100 m). It was first established in 1924 at a site on Booth Lake 300 feet lower, was moved in the early 1930s, and then again in 1940 to its "glorious perch" on Fletcher Creek. It is named after Charles A. Vogelsang, president of the California State Board of Fish and Game for 12 years, as are nearby Vogelsang Peak at 11,516 feet (3,510 m), and Vogelsang Lake.

The camp is located 7.2 miles (11.6 km) south of Tuolumne Meadows Lodge, and 7.6 miles (12.2 km) northeast of the Merced Lake High Sierra Camp by the Fletcher Creek Trail. An alternate route, which crosses Vogelsang Pass at 10,480 feet (3,190 m) and then takes the Lewis Creek Trail to Merced Lake, is 8.4 miles (13.5 km).

=== Merced Lake High Sierra Camp ===
The Merced Lake High Sierra Camp is the lowest elevation of the camps at 7,150 feet (2,180 m), and is located on Merced Lake on the Merced River. It is directly upstream from Yosemite Valley and is the most accessible of the camps from the Valley by hiking, at a distance of 13.0 miles (20.9 km). Because of its comparatively low elevation, this camp is relatively warm and is located in a heavily wooded area.

The camp site was originally a US Cavalry patrol outpost beginning in 1905. The site became one of the original hikers' camps built in 1916, and closed in 1918 during World War I. It reopened as a boys' sports camp in 1922, featuring tennis, basketball, baseball, boating, fishing, hiking and swimming. Yosemite Park and Curry Company began operating the camp in 1926.

The Vogelsang High Sierra Camp is located a hiking distance of 7.6 miles (12.2 km) north by the Fletcher Creek trail, or a hiking distance of 8.4 miles (13.5 km) north by the Fletcher Creek trail and then over Vogelsang Pass. Sunrise High Sierra Camp is located a hiking distance of 10.0 miles (16.1 km) northwest.

=== Sunrise High Sierra Camp ===
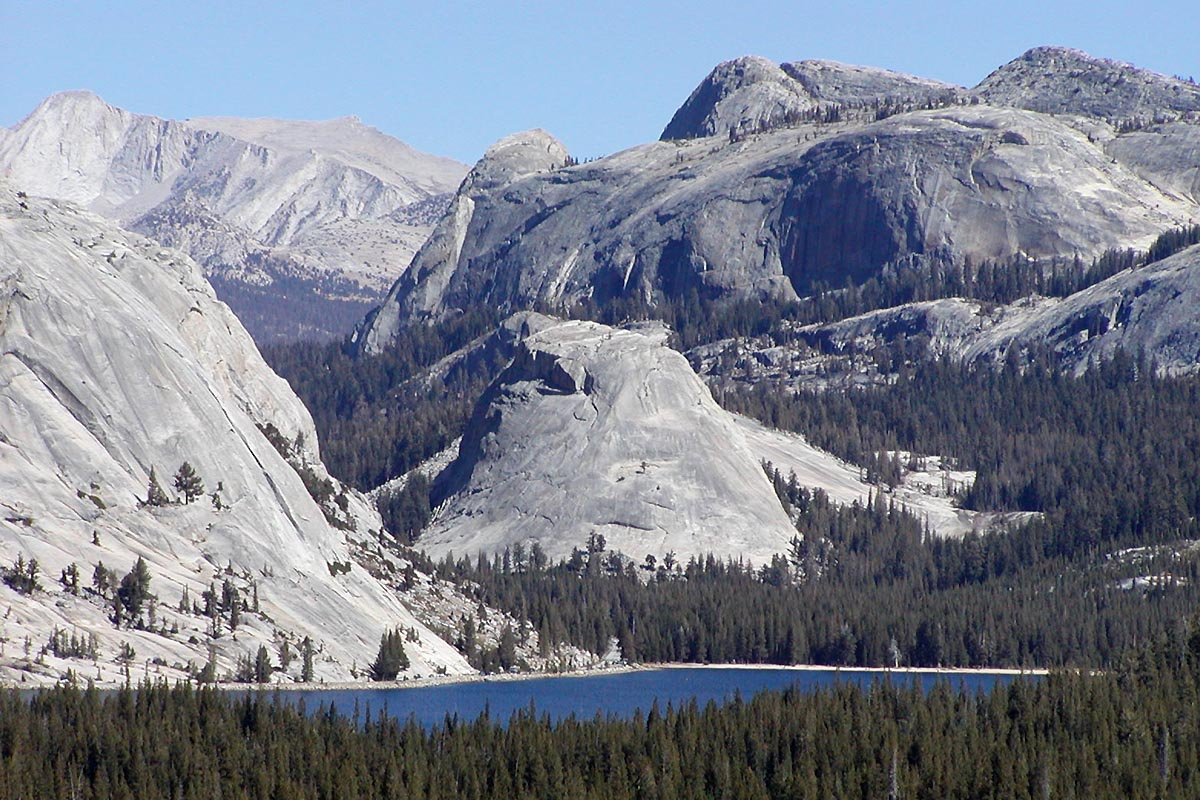
Tenaya Lake is located between the Sunrise High Sierra Camp and the May Lake High Sierra Camp.

The Sunrise High Sierra Camp was the last of the Yosemite camps to be established. It was founded on July 15, 1961, when Mary Curry Tresidder of the Yosemite Park and Curry Company opened the camp on a shelf above Long Meadow, at an elevation of 9,400 feet (2,900 m).

This final link made it possible for hikers to take a six-day wilderness loop trip around the Cathedral Range from the Tuolumne River to the Merced River and back again, without carrying a heavy backpack, since nightly accommodations and meals were available at six points along the way. Clouds Rest, one of John Muir's favorite peaks, is located 7 miles (11 km) southwest.

The Merced Lake High Sierra Camp is located a hiking distance of 10.0 miles (16.1 km) southeast, and the May Lake High Sierra Camp is located a hiking distance of 8.3 miles (13.4 km) northwest.

== Tuolumne Meadows Lodge ==
Tuolumne Meadows Lodge is located a short distance off the Tioga Road, and is accessible by car. It is located on the Dana Fork of the Tuolumne River in Tuolumne Meadows at an elevation of 8,600 feet. It was among the first three camps established in 1916, and is the largest and most popular of the High Sierra Camps. Due to World War I, the camp was closed from 1918 to 1922. It has operated continuously (though seasonally) since, including through World War II.

The Glen Aulin High Sierra Camp is located a hiking distance of 7.6 miles north, and the Vogelsang High Sierra Camp is located a hiking distance of 7.2 miles south by the Rafferty Creek trail.

== White Wolf High Sierra Camp ==
The White Wolf High Sierra Camp has an identity somewhat separate from the other six Yosemite camps, because it is located 23.5 miles west of the Glen Aulin High Sierra Camp, and is not usually part of the camp-to-camp hiking tradition. A settler named John Meyer homesteaded in the area in the 1870s. It is the oldest of the camps, with its origins in the 1882-1883 mining boom in the Tioga Pass area, when a wagon road was built to the mines, and White Wolf became a stop along that road. However, the mines soon failed, and Meyer then used the road for cattle drives and to haul supplies to White Wolf.

The National Park Service purchased the road in 1915, and cars began to enter the High Sierra. Due to a need for gasoline, repairs and campsites, John Meyer's son, also named John Meyer, developed a business along the road including a lodge, kitchen and dining room. An improved Tioga Road was built in 1938, which bypassed White Wolf. However, the resort prospered due to increased traffic to the High Sierra, even though White Wolf was no longer on the main road. In 1951, the Meyer family sold White Wolf to the National Park Service for $25,000.

== Bearpaw High Sierra Camp ==
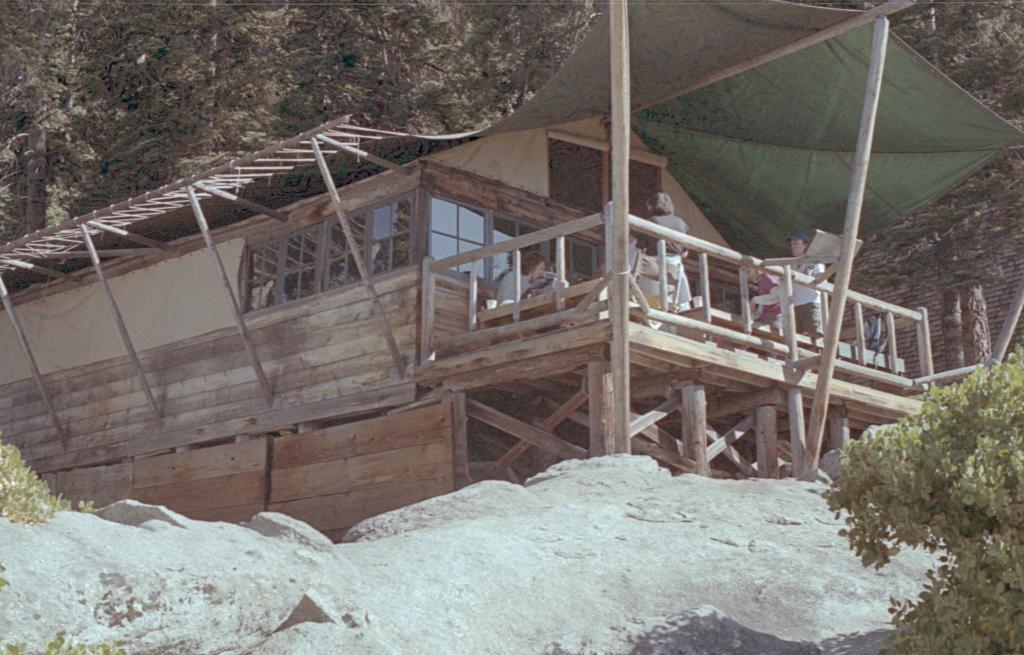
Bearpaw High Sierra Camp Main Tent

Bearpaw High Sierra Camp was founded in 1934, and is located in Sequoia National Park on the High Sierra Trail, which crosses the Sierra Nevada from west to east. It is located 11.5 miles (18.5 km) east of the western trailhead at Crescent Meadow, at an elevation of 7,800 feet (2,400 m) overlooking the Great Western Divide.

== Sequoia High Sierra Camp ==
In 2006, The Sequoia High Sierra Camp, located in Giant Sequoia National Monument, was established and as of 2007, it is the newest camp.

The camp is located at 8,500 feet (2,600 m). Mitchell Peak 10,365 feet (3,159 m) is three miles away and its summit offers "top-of-the-world views of nearly 100 miles of Sierra Crest, Kings Canyon, the Monarch Divide and dozens of peaks, canyons and points of renown."
