= USS Vogelgesang (DD-862) =

Gearing-class destroyer

Coordinates: 19.0623191°N 104.3021265°W

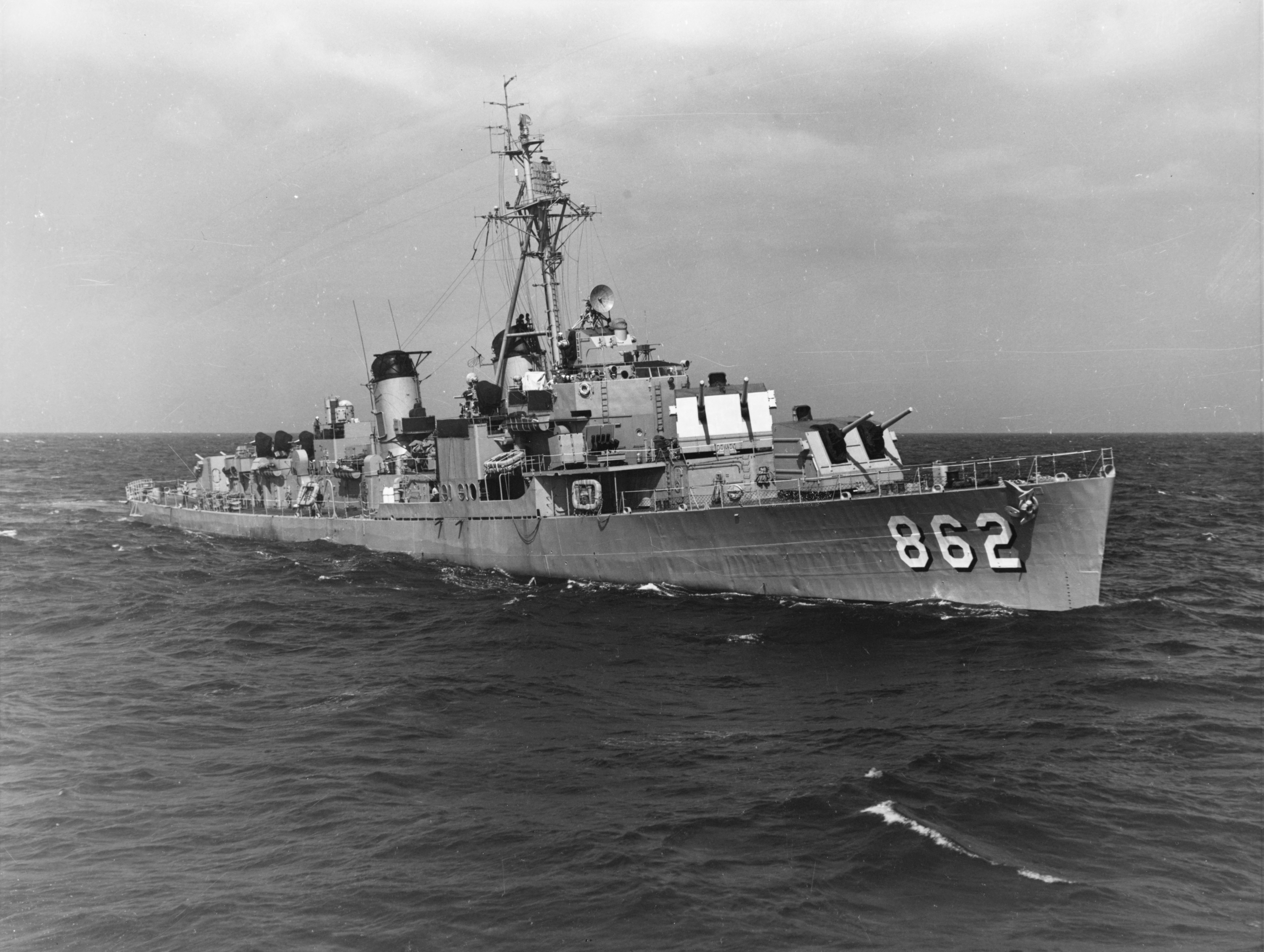
- USS Vogelgesang c. 1954

History

United States
- Name: Vogelgesang
- Namesake: Carl Theodore Vogelgesang
- Builder: Bethlehem Mariners Harbor, Staten Island
- Laid down: 3 August 1944
- Launched: 15 January 1945
- Commissioned: 28 April 1945
- Decommissioned: 24 February 1982
- Stricken: 24 February 1982
- Identification: Callsign: NBFP; Hull number: DD-862
- Motto: Drauf und Dran
- Honors and awards: 2 battle stars (Vietnam)
- Fate: Sold to Mexico, 24 February 1982
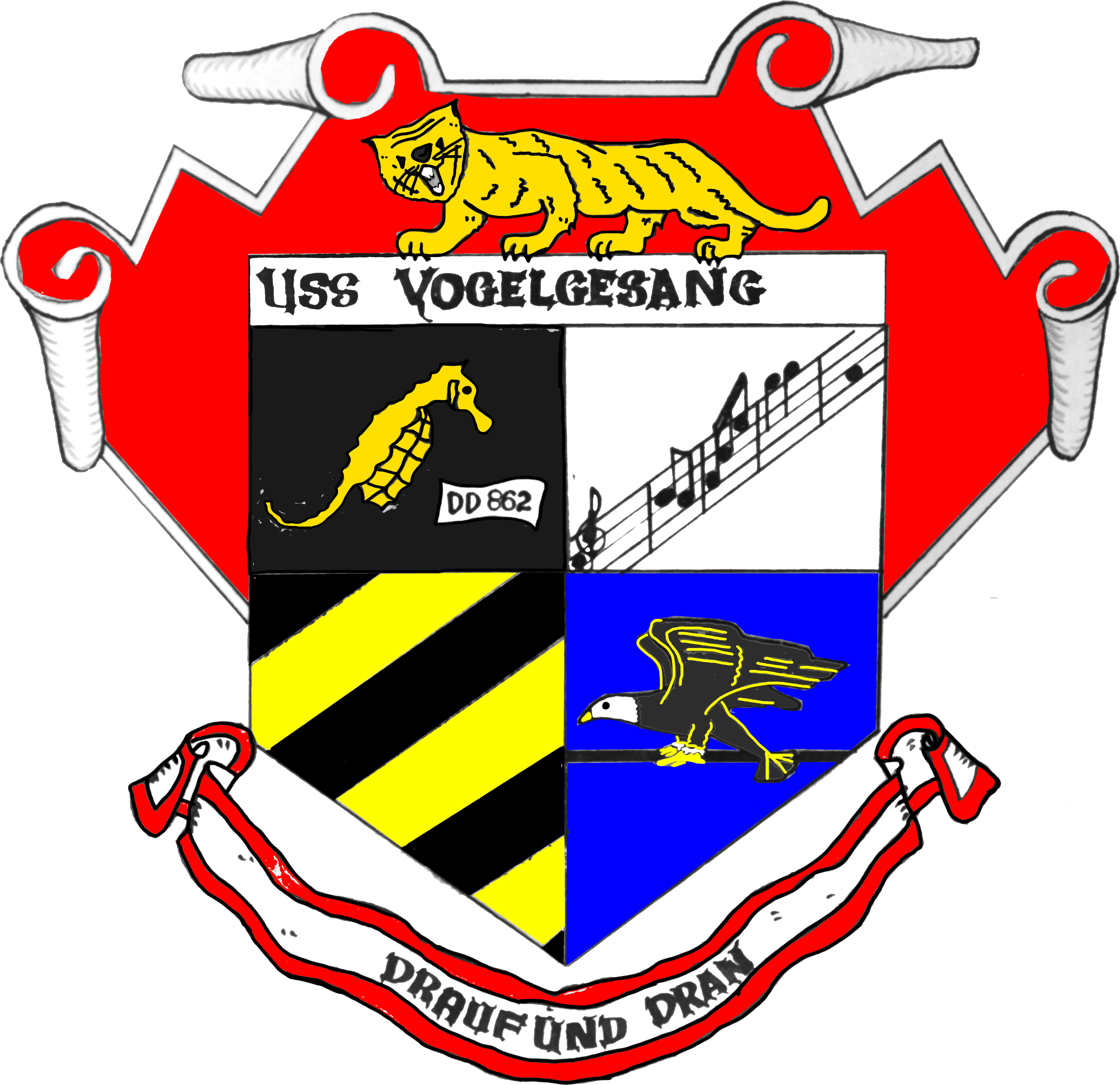
- Badge

Mexico
- Name: Quetzalcoatl
- Namesake: Quetzalcoatl
- Acquired: 24 February 1982
- Decommissioned: late 2002

General characteristics
- Class & type: Gearing-class destroyer
- Displacement: 3,460 long tons (3,516 t) full
- Length: 390 ft 6 in (119.02 m)
- Beam: 40 ft 10 in (12.45 m)
- Draft: 14 ft 4 in (4.37 m)
- Propulsion: General Electric geared turbines, 2 shafts, 60,000 shp (45 MW)
- Speed: 36.8 knots (68.2 km/h; 42.3 mph)
- Range: 4,500 nmi (8,300 km) at 20 kn (37 km/h; 23 mph)
- Complement: 336
- Armament: 6 × 5"/38 caliber guns; 12 × 40 mm AA guns; 11 × 20 mm AA guns; 10 × 21 inch (533 mm) torpedo tubes; 6 × depth charge projectors; 2 × depth charge tracks

USS Vogelgesang (DD-862) was a Gearing-class destroyer in the United States Navy. She was named for Rear Admiral Carl Theodore Vogelgesang USN (1869–1927).

Vogelgesang was laid down by the Bethlehem Steel Corporation at Staten Island in New York on 3 August 1944, launched on 15 January 1945 by Miss Zenaide Vogelgesang and commissioned on 28 April 1945.

== Service history ==
Vogelgesang alternated operations along the United States East Coast and in the Caribbean Sea with the Second Fleet with deployments to the Mediterranean with the Sixth Fleet, underwent an extensive Fleet Rehabilitation and Modernization (FRAM) overhaul at the Boston Naval Shipyard between 1 March 1962 and 31 January 1963, served as part of the Project Gemini recovery force which picked up the unmanned experimental Gemini 2 spacecraft in January 1965, and served as plane guard for carriers on "Yankee Station" in the Tonkin Gulf, participated in "Sea Dragon" operations, patrolled on search and rescue duties and carried out naval gunfire support missions during the Vietnam War.

=== 1945–1959 ===
Vogelgesang conducted shakedown training out of Guantánamo Bay, Cuba, from mid-May to late June and returned to New York on 24 June for post-shakedown availability. In July, she moved to Newport, Rhode Island, for gunnery exercises and, in August, began duty at Norfolk as a training platform for destroyer nucleus crews. In October, she interrupted her training schedule to take part in the Navy Day festivities at New York but resumed those duties in November. For the next two years, the destroyer operated out of Norfolk, along the east coast, and in the West Indies, conducting exercises both independently and in company with other units of the United States Atlantic Fleet. On 10 November 1947, she stood out of Norfolk on her first deployment to the Mediterranean Sea. She arrived at Gibraltar on 20 November and, after a little more than three months of exercises and port visits, departed the "middle sea" on 2 March 1948.

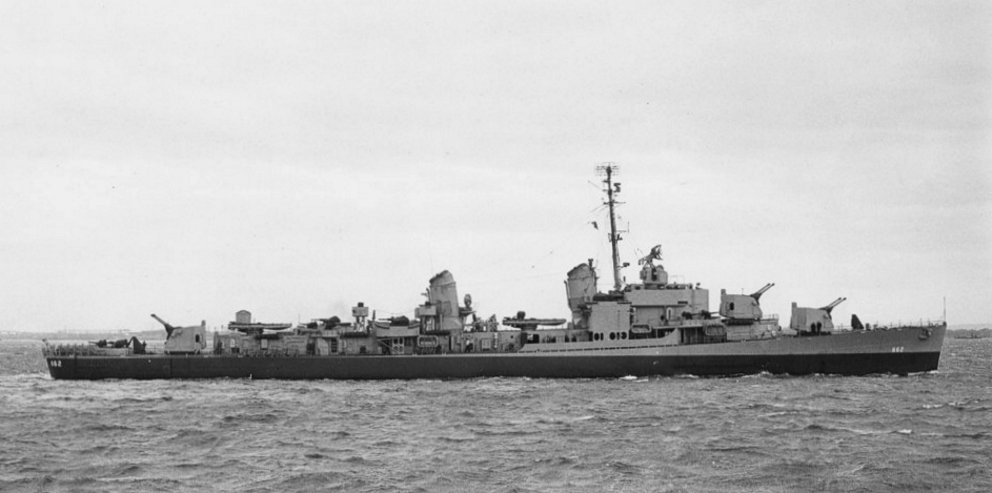
USS Vogelgesang in 1945.

The warship arrived back in Norfolk on 11 March and resumed a normal schedule of Second Fleet operations. She ranged up and down the east coast until 4 January 1949 at which time she headed back to the Mediterranean. Vogelgesang completed her second deployment to the Sixth Fleet on 14 May, departed Gibraltar that day, reentered Norfolk on the 23d, and commenced a two-month upkeep period.

Over the next eight years, Vogelgesang alternated five deployments to the Mediterranean with tours of duty along the east coast and in the West Indies. In addition, she also visited northern European ports during the summer of 1956 while on a midshipman training cruise. Her five Mediterranean tours consisted of normal training operations with units of the Sixth Fleet and with elements of Allied navies as well as port visits at various points throughout the Mediterranean. In 1957, there came a change in Vogelgesang's routine of the previous eight years. She deployed to the Mediterranean once more in July; but, on this deployment, she added service in the Indian Ocean. She added Aden and Massawa in Eritrea to her list of ports of call. In December, when she returned to the Mediterranean for another deployment with the Sixth Fleet, she again transited the Suez Canal, repeated her former visits to middle eastern ports, and added Bahrain Island and Abadan, Iran, to her itinerary.

During the following nine years, Vogelgesang continue her schedule of alternating Mediterranean cruises and Sixth Fleet operations.

=== 1960–1970 ===
The motto: Drauf Und Dran was established in 1960 by Cdr. Robert P. Foreman, Commanding Officer during a visit to the ship by officers of the German Navy whose ships were visiting the Charleston, SC Naval Base. In October, 1960, she departed for a goodwill trip with four other ships to South America and Africa called SOLANT AMITY as part of President Eisenhower's "People to People Program." Ports of call included Trinidad, Belem Brazil, Senegal, Guinea, Gambia, Sierra Leone, Ivory Coast, Cameroon, Congo, and South Africa. Highlights of the trip included members of the crew singing Christmas carols for Milton Margai, the first prime minister of an independent Sierra Leone at his residence. The prime minister invited the crew into his home, offered everyone a glass of wine, and played the violin for us. In early 1961, Vogelgesang and USS Gearing (DD-710) were called to intercept the Santa Maria, a Portuguese cruise ship which had been hijacked in the Caribbean. Both ships left Abidjan, Ivory Coast, crossed the Atlantic, and followed Santa Maria into Recife, Brazil. The story is featured in Charles Kuralt's book, A Life on the Road. During the African tour, Vogelgesang diverted course and conducted a brief "Crossing the Line" ceremony at 0 degrees latitude and 0 degrees longitude.

In 1961 and 1962, she provided support for the Project "Mercury" space shot.

On 1 March 1962, she entered the Boston Naval Shipyard to begin a fleet rehabilitation and modernization (FRAM) overhaul. For the next 10 months, she underwent extensive structural changes as well as equipment installation to improve greatly her anti-submarine warfare capabilities. She completed her FRAM conversion on 31 January 1963 then deployed to Guantanamo Bay where she did picket duty as part of the post-Cuban Missile Crisis operation. During this deployment the Vogelgesang was charged with a humanitarian mission to the Dominican Republic. She resumed normal operations at Norfolk. In 1964, she participated in two binational exercises with Canadian ships, CANUS SILEX in March and CANUS SLAMEX in September.

In October and November, she returned to European waters to participate in a large amphibious exercise, "Operation Steel Pike I," carried out on the Atlantic coast of Spain. In January 1965, the warship served as part of the recovery force which picked up an unmanned experimental Gemini spacecraft. In June, she deployed to the Mediterranean once again for a two-month tour of duty with the Sixth Fleet. Vogelgesang resumed Second Fleet operations early in September following another joint United States-Canadian exercise in August on her way back from Europe. On 3 December, she began her first regular overhaul since her FRAM conversion when she entered the Norfolk Naval Shipyard.

Vogelgesang completed overhaul and sea trials on 22 March 1966 and resumed normal duty with the U.S. Atlantic Fleet. That assignment lasted until 1 June at which time she and the other ships of Destroyer Squadron (DesRon) 32 steamed out of Norfolk for a deployment to the western Pacific with Commander Destroyer Division 322 (COMDESDIV 322) embarked. Steaming by way of the Panama Canal, Pearl Harbor, and Guam, she and the other ships of Destroyer Squadron 32 reported for duty with the Seventh Fleet at Subic Bay in the Philippines on 15 July. On 19 July, she headed for the Gulf of Tonkin in the screen of the aircraft carrier Constellation. The task group arrived in the gulf on 28 July, and Vogelgesang provided anti-submarine defense and plane guard services as the carrier's air group struck at targets in North Vietnam. On 15 August, the destroyer closed the shores of South Vietnam to provide gunfire support for troops operating ashore. On the night of 18 and 19 August, her 5-inch guns succeeded in breaking up a company-strength Viet Cong attack on a Popular Forces outpost near Huong Dien. Reports credited her main battery with killing 70 and wounding 40 of the attacking guerrillas. In addition to service in Vietnamese waters, the warship made visits to Hong Kong and Kaohsiung on Taiwan as well as periodic stops at Subic Bay for upkeep and replenishments. Vogelgesang concluded her only combat cruise during the Vietnam War on 10 November when she stood out of Subic Bay, bound — via the Indian Ocean, the Suez Canal, and the Mediterranean Sea — for Norfolk. She completed her round-the-world cruise at her home port on 17 December.

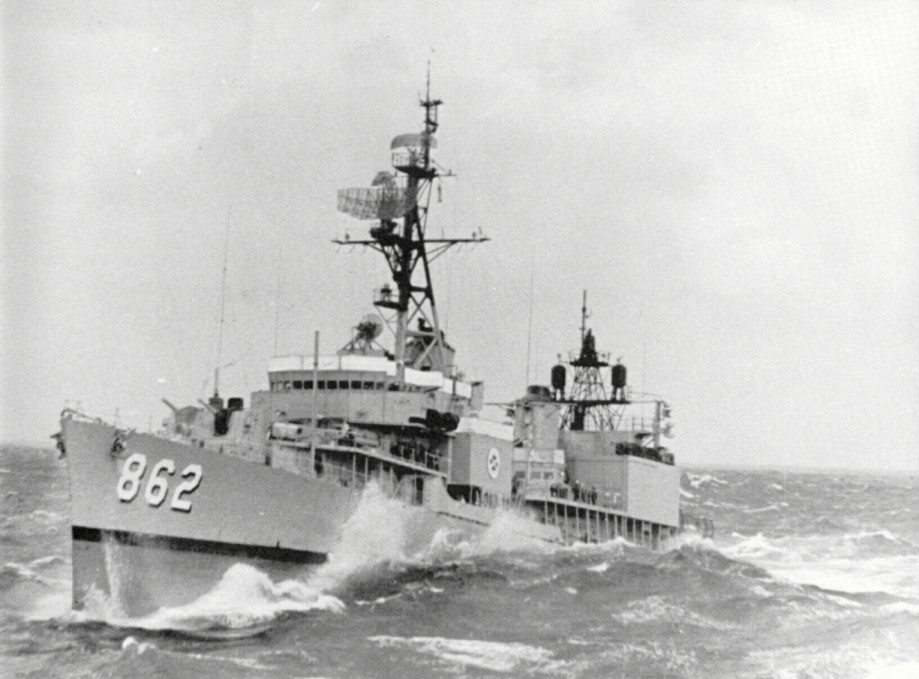
Vogelgesang in heavy seas, following her FRAM-modernisation.

After post-deployment standdown, Vogelgesang resumed her schedule alternating Mediterranean cruises with operations out of Norfolk. She spent the first 10 months of 1967 engaged in training operations along the east coast and in the West Indies. On 14 November 1967, the warship stood out of Norfolk for her first tour of duty with the Sixth Fleet since 1965. On 24 November, she conducted turnover ceremonies at the Spanish island of Mallorca and officially joined the Sixth Fleet. For the next five months, the destroyer ranged the length and breadth of the Mediterranean, conducting training evolutions and making port visits. On 13 April 1968, she departed Málaga, Spain, to return to Norfolk.

After a 10-day transit, she reentered her home port on the 23rd. She resumed normal Second Fleet operations until 22 July at which time she departed Norfolk for a cruise to South American waters to participate in UNITAS IX, a series of multinational exercises with units of various Latin American navies. She concluded that assignment on 3 September when she reentered Norfolk.

Normal operations and a series of tender availabilities in preparation for overhaul occupied her time from September 1968 to June 1969. On 2 June 1969, she departed Norfolk, en route to Boston. The warship entered the Boston Naval Shipyard and commenced regular overhaul on 5 June. She concluded sea trials successfully late in September and departed Boston on 3 October and arrived in Norfolk on the 5th. For the remainder of the year, the ship conducted post-repair exercises and refresher training in the Guantanamo Bay operating area. She returned to Norfolk on 14 December and remained in port for the rest of the year.

=== 1970–1980 ===
Normal operations out of Norfolk occupied her until 30 April 1970 at which time she embarked upon another Mediterranean tour of duty. She changed operational control to Sixth Fleet on 10 May and conducted turnover at Mallorca between the 12th and the 17th. For the first four months of the deployment, Vogelgesang conducted normal Sixth Fleet operations — port visits and training evolutions. However, early in September, she joined a special contingency force assembled in the eastern Mediterranean in response to Syrian intervention in the Jordanian civil war on the side of militant, anti-government, Arab guerrillas. She cruised that portion of the sea from 5 September to 6 October. Finally, however, the American show of force succeeded in getting the Syrian forces to withdraw from Jordan, and Vogelgesang rejoined Sixth Fleet. On 8 November, she departed Palma de Mallorca to return home.

The warship reentered Norfolk on 17 November and remained there through the end of the year. The destroyer resumed normal Second Fleet operations early in 1971 and remained so occupied for the next 11 months.

On 1 December 1971, she departed Norfolk for another tour of duty with the Sixth Fleet in the Mediterranean. She arrived in port at Rota, Spain, on the 9th and conducted turnover ceremonies. For the following six months, Vogelgesang operated throughout the Mediterranean, engaged in the usual round of exercises and port visits. After turnover in Rota, the destroyer got underway on 23 June to return to Norfolk.

On the 29th, she steamed into Hampton Roads and soon began a tender availability alongside the destroyer tender Sierra. She conducted operations out of Norfolk until 10 October at which time she began an extended repair period at the Norfolk Shipbuilding & Drydock Corp. The warship completed repairs on 26 January 1973 and finished sea trials by early February. She conducted normal operations for the remainder of the year, steaming as far south as the West Indies.

On 10 January 1974, Vogelgesang was transferred from DesRon 2 to DesRon 28 and reassigned to Naval Reserve training duty. On 1 March, her home port was changed from Norfolk to Newport, Rhode Island. On 19 March, she headed out of Norfolk, bound for her new home port, where she arrived the following day. From that time, Vogelgesang operated at and out of Newport as a training platform for naval reservists, NROTC midshipmen, and OCS students. She alternated short periods at sea with weeks in port as a stationary training platform. Periodically, however, she made extended training cruises down the east coast to the West Indies. At the beginning of 1980, the destroyer continued to serve with the Naval Reserve training program, based at Newport.

Vogelgesang earned two battle stars for service during the Vietnam War.

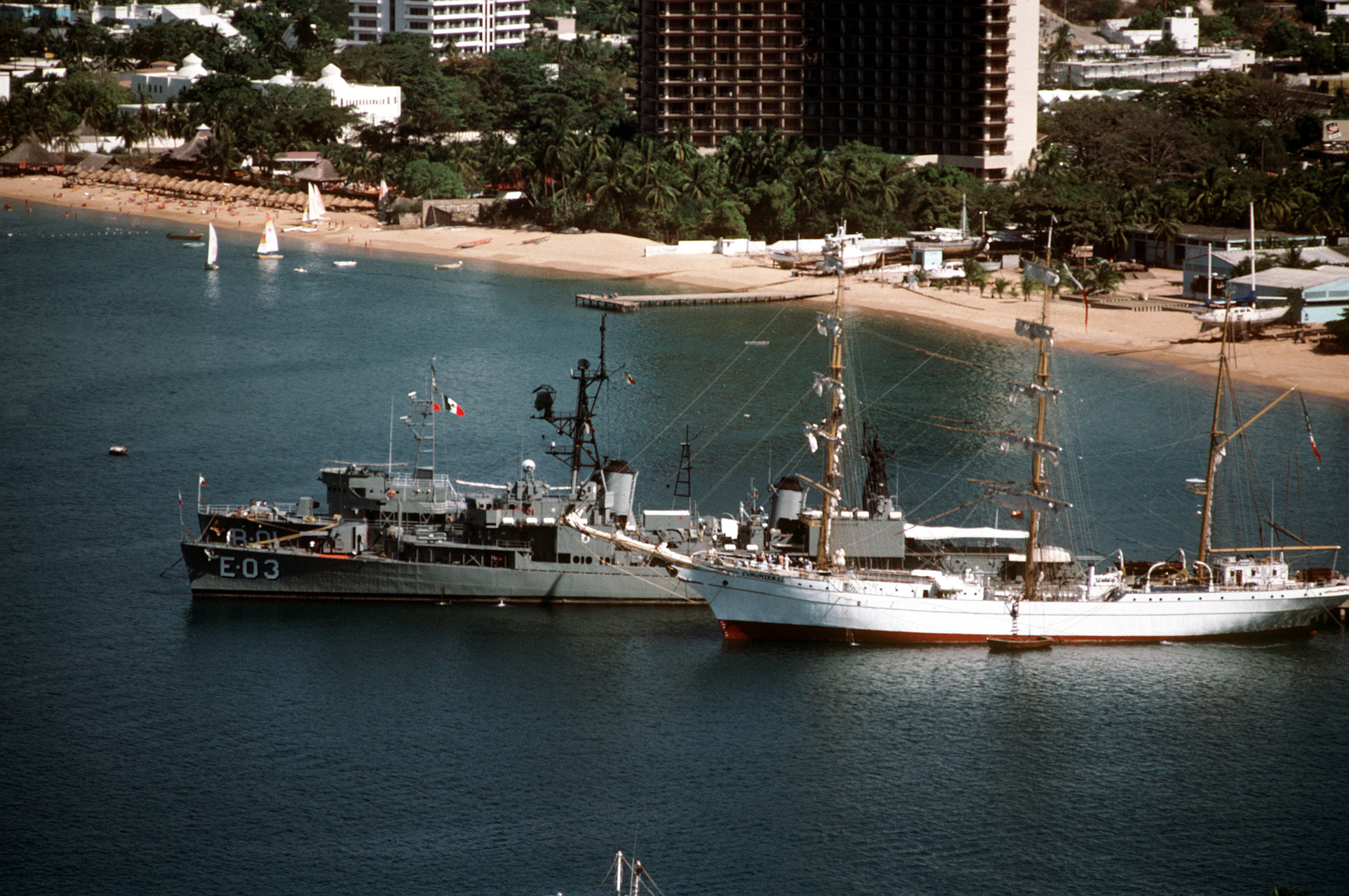
Quetzalcoatl in 1985.

=== Decommissioning and transfer ===
Vogelgesang was decommissioned and stricken from the Naval Vessel Register on 24 February 1982, transferred to Mexico and renamed Quetzalcoatl (E-03). In 1993, the ship had a single Bofors 57 mm gun mounted in "B" position, between the forward 5 inch mount and the ship's bridge. Also during that year, the ship was renamed Ilhuicamina with the pennant number E-10, although by 2002 the ship had reverted to the name Quetzalcoatl. In 1994, (Note: 1996 according to Jane's Fighting Ships.) the ASROC launcher and anti-submarine torpedo tubes were removed. In 2001, the ship again changed Pennant number, to D 101. She was decommissioned by the Mexican Navy in late 2002. On 24 November 2006, the ship was scuttled to form an artificial reef. Her main tripod mast is on display in Mexican Pacific Fleet headquarters, Mexico.
