= Vogelsang Peak =

Summit in Yosemite National Park

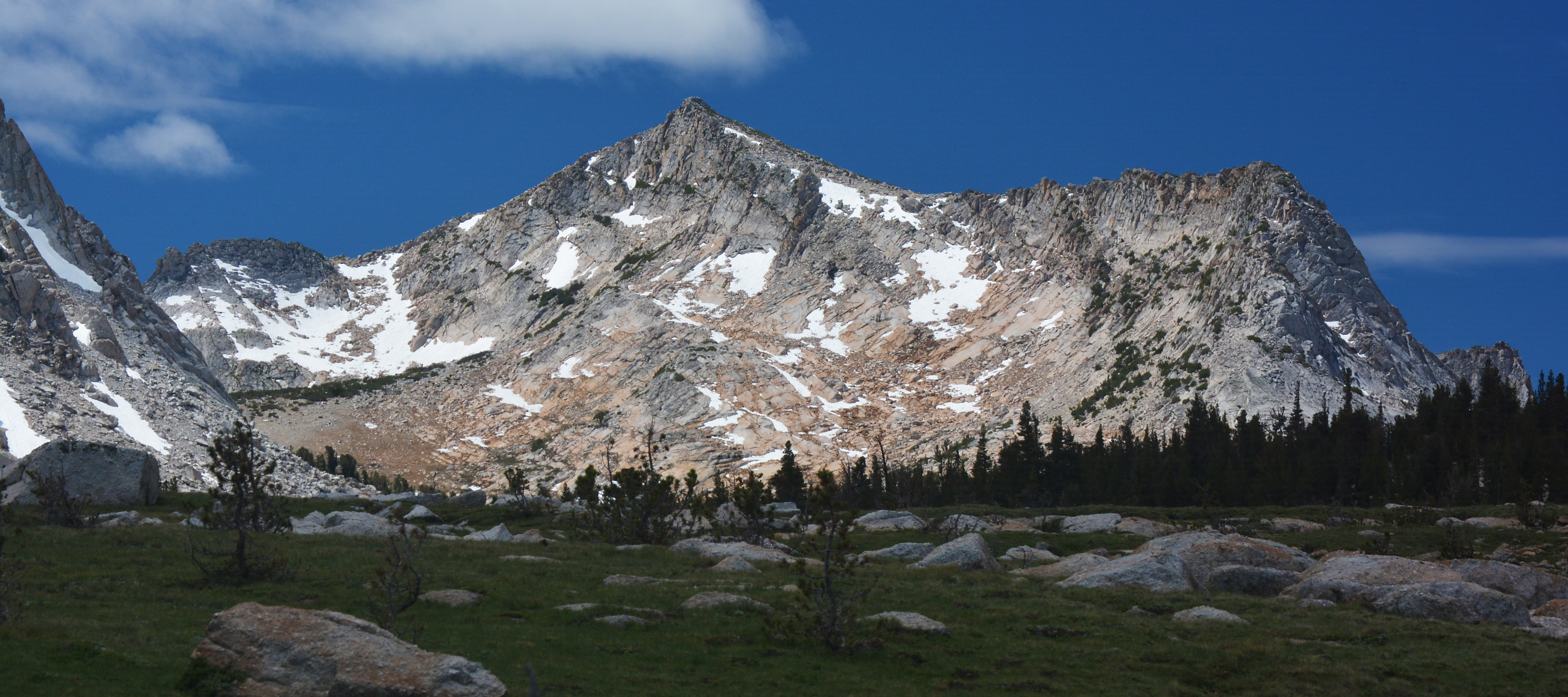
- Vogelsang Peak as seen from the Rafferty Creek valley in late June

Highest point
- Elevation: 11,498 ft (3,505 m) NAVD 88
- Prominence: 853 ft (260 m)
- Listing: Highest mountains of Yosemite NP
- Coordinates: 37°46′39″N 119°20′58″W

Geography
- Location within California
- Location: Yosemite National Park; Mariposa County, California, U.S.
- Parent range: Cathedral Range
- Topo map: USGS Vogelsang Peak

Climbing
- First ascent: 1923 by François E. Matthes
- Easiest route: Simple Scramble, class 2

Vogelsang Peak is a peak in the Cathedral Range of Yosemite National Park, located in northeastern Mariposa County, California. Though Mount Florence is higher, at 12,567 feet (3,830 m), at 11,498 feet (3,505 m) the summit rises higher than most of the surrounding peaks, and offers sweeping panoramic views in every direction.

== Naming ==
The peak was named by Col. H.C. Benson in 1907. There is dispute over whether the peak was named for Charles A Vogelsang, an executive officer of California's State Fish and Game Commission from 1896 to 1901, or his brother Alexander Theodore Vogelsang, who served as president of the California State Board of Fish and Game from 1901 to 1910.

== Topography ==
Vogelsang Peak's southeastern side is made up of a relatively uniform arc of steep rock. Its northwestern side is a series of cirques and sheer cliffs. Well known climbing routes include the Nightingale Arête (II 5.9) and the West Face (IV 5.10 A2). Vogelsang Pass, Vogelsang Lake and the Vogelsang High Sierra Camp are located northeast of the summit.
