= Peter Vogelzang =

Peter Vogelzang (born 11 February 1945, Utrecht) is a Dutch businessman and member of the board of directors of Feyenoord Rotterdam. Vogelzang worked as a director for the Royal Dutch Football Association (KNVB) and is part of the board of directors of the KNVB as well. He was Chef de Mission of the Dutch Olympic Committee during the 2004 Summer Olympics in Athens.

At Feyenoord, Vogelzang was appointed in April 2007 for a period of five months. He is the central person for all directors and board members which have a goal to restructure the club after Jorien van den Herik was forced to resign. With the appointment of Vogelzang commercial director Chris Woerts and Onno Jacobs as director finance and operations, Vogelzang focused on more specific subjects in their jobs. Under his regime Feyenoord started two "talent pools" of which several talented players of the club, including Royston Drenthe, Jonathan de Guzman, Luigi Bruins, Ron Vlaar, Andwélé Slory and Georginio Wijnaldum are part. Fans of the club with a lot of money, mostly directors of companies are able to invest 250,000 euros each in the talent pool, eventually they will be awarded a total of 25% of the profit that is made out of selling the players in the talent pools. The pools were successful from the beginning and the first one was sold out within a few weeks, which resulted in the start of the second pool which also turned out to be a success. Unless financial trouble and a disappointing season for Feyenoord in which they were excluded for the UEFA Cup, only finished 9th in the Eredivisie and missed out on European football for the next season Feyenoord was able to do some surprise signings. Players like Giovanni van Bronckhorst, Tim de Cler, Kevin Hofland and Roy Makaay (all (former) Dutch internationals) were purchased with money that was made available out of the talent pools. Vogelzang will stay at the club until October 2007.
