= Mesothelioma Applied Research Foundation =

Nonprofit organization

- Formation: 1999
- Type: Non-profit organization
- Legal status: Foundation
- Headquarters: Washington, D.C.
- Location(s): 1717 K Street NW Suite 900 Washington, D.C. 20006
- Region served: United States
- Director of Communications and Operations: Maja Belamaric
- Website: www.curemeso.org

The Mesothelioma Applied Research Foundation (Meso Foundation, formerly MARF) is a nonprofit organization funded by charitable donations that in turn funds mesothelioma research, provides support services to patients, educates the public, and advocates in Washington, DC for governmental funding for mesothelioma research. The organization's mission is to eradicate mesothelioma, a cancer caused by exposure to asbestos, as a life-ending disease.

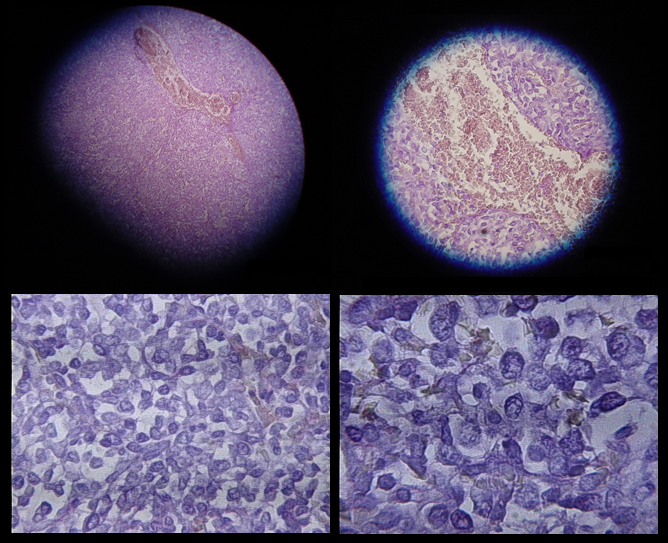

Of its donors, 65% are individuals personally affected by mesothelioma. The remaining 35% include pharmaceutical companies, labor unions, plaintiff and defendant attorneys, and companies that have manufactured asbestos products.

As of 2023, the foundation has funded over $11.5 million in clinical research and is the host of the annual International Symposium on Malignant Mesothelioma. The organization was founded in 1999 and became tax-exempt in 2000. The organization's board of directors is composed by Marjorie G. Zauderer, MD, Westchester Medical Center, Chair; Jessica Blackford-Cleeton; Cheryl Bruner, Esq.; Keith Cengel, MD, PhD, University of Pennsylvania; Darciena Christel; Jason Foster, MD, University of Nebraska; R. Taylor Ripley, MD, Baylor University; Daniel Sterman, MD, New York University; James Stevenson, MD, Cleveland Clinic.

== See also ==
- American Cancer Society
- American Lung Association
- Asbestos Disease Awareness Organization
- Lung Cancer Alliance
