= Floy =

Floy may be a person's name, nickname, or family name, or part of certain titles.

== People ==
- Adam Floy Casad, an American football player and an officer in the United States Army
- Nina Floy Bracelin, a botanist, plant collector, and scientific illustrator

=== Name or nickname ===
- Floy Agnes Lee, a biologist who worked on the Manhattan Project
- Floy Campbell, an American painter
- Floy Clements, an American actress and politician in Illinois
- Floy Hutchings, daughter of James Mason Hutchings and his wife Elvira
- Floy Little Bartlett, an American composer
- Floy Schoenfelder, an American disability rights advocate

=== Family name ===
- Delbert Floy, an American politician who served in the Iowa Senate
- Margaret Floy Washburn, a leading American psychologist in the early 20th century

== Music ==
- Floy Joy (disambiguation)
  - "Floy Joy" (song), a 1971 song by The Supremes
    - Floy Joy (album), a 1972 album by The Supremes
  - Floy Joy (band), a 1980s Synthpop band
- "Flat Foot Floogie (with a Floy Floy)", a 1938 jazz song

== See also ==
- Floyd (disambiguation)
