= Mount Florence =

Mountain in Yosemite National Park

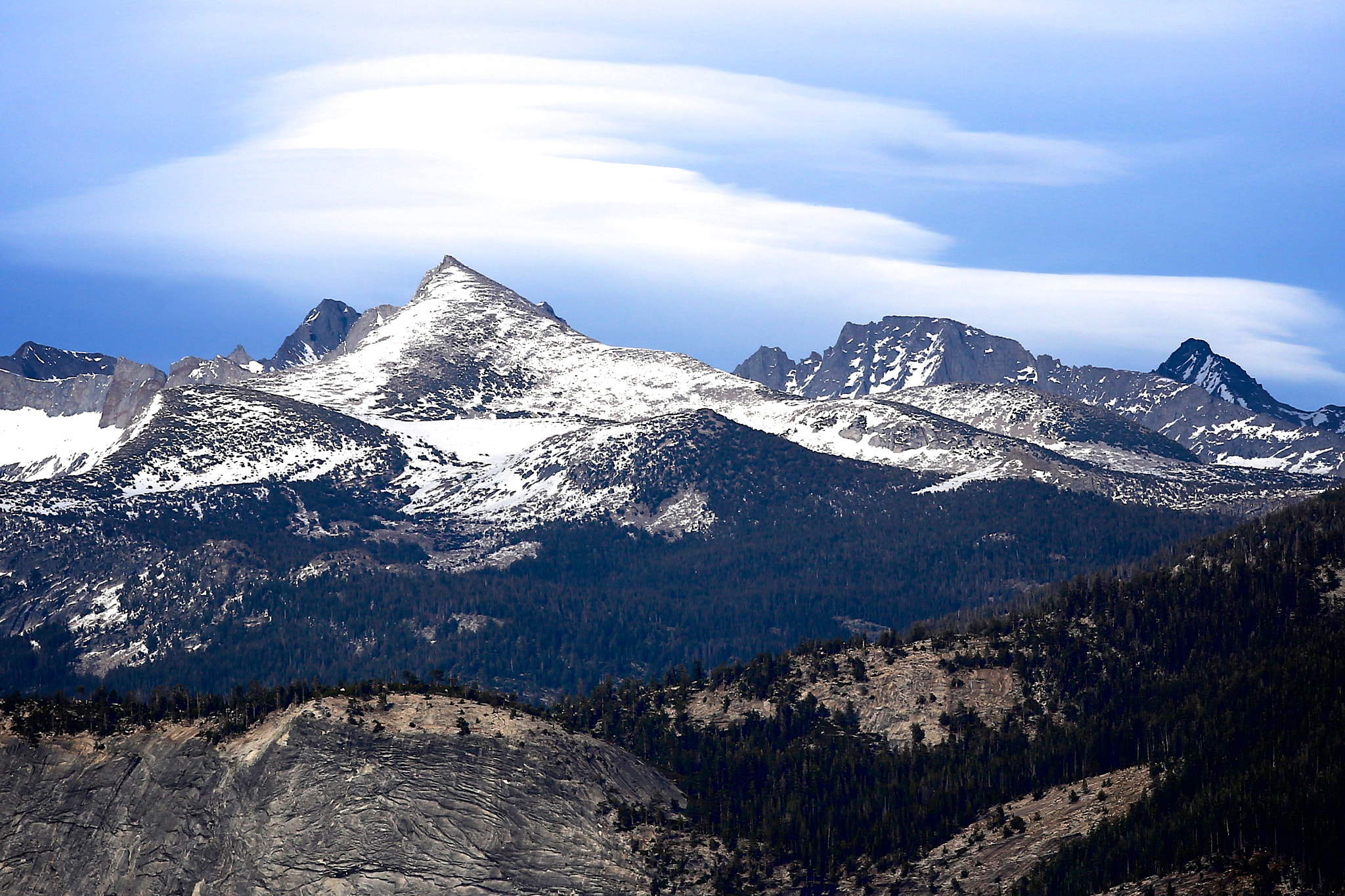
- Mt. Florence (left of center), from Glacier Point

Highest point
- Elevation: 12,567 ft (3,830 m) NAVD 88
- Prominence: 801 ft (244 m)
- Listing: Sierra Peaks Section Peak; WSC Emblem Peak
- Coordinates: 37°44′23″N 119°18′58″W

Naming
- Etymology: Florence Hutchings

Geography
- Location within California Location within the United States
- Location: Yosemite National Park; Madera County, California, U.S.
- Parent range: Cathedral Range
- Topo map: USGS Mount Lyell

Climbing
- Easiest route: Simple scramble, class 2

Mount Florence is a mountain, in the Tuolumne Meadows region of Yosemite National Park. Its easiest route is a class 2 scramble. Mount Florence is the tenth highest mountain in Yosemite. Deep in the Yosemite backcountry, Mount Florence is not often climbed, though on the trip, one passes through spectacular scenery, on all approaches.

== The mountain's name ==
August 23, 1864, Florence Hutchings, "Floy" as she was nicknamed, was the first white child, born in Yosemite Valley. She was also nicknamed the "Yosemite Tomboy," and lived a non-comformist life, riding horses, was scornful of disapproval, did not fear peril, and swore. She had a zest for life, and died young, in 1881, at the age of 17. She knew John Muir, who named Mount Florence for her.

She was religious and worked as a caretaker of the Yosemite Valley Chapel.

== Near to Mount Florence ==
All of the following are close to Mount Florence:

Mountain	Distance
Electra Peak	
Fletcher Peak	
Foerster Peak	
Mount Maclure	1.9 miles (3.1 km)
Simmons Peak	1.9 miles (3.1 km)
Mount Lyell	2.4 miles (3.9 km)
Parsons Peak	2.6 miles (4.2 km)
Parsons Peak	2.6 miles (4.2 km)
Vogelsang Peak	3.1 miles (5.0 km)
