= Florence Hutchings =

Colorful girl, native of Yosemite National Park

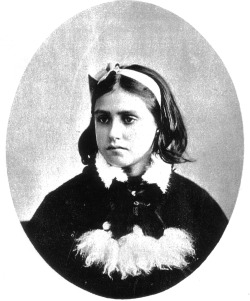
- Born: August 23, 1864; Yosemite Valley
- Died: September 23, 1881; Yosemite Valley
- Burial place: Yosemite Cemetery; 37.74877°N 119.58892°W
- Parents: James Mason Hutchings (father); Elvira Hutchings (mother)

Florence Hutchings (also Floy or Flora, August 23, 1864 – September 26, 1881) was the daughter of James Mason Hutchings and his wife Elvira. She is the namesake of Yosemite's Mount Florence.

== Her life ==
She was born on August 23, 1864, and was the first non-Ahwahnechee born in Yosemite Valley.

Her birth occurred in the Hutchings' Upper Hotel, and she grew up in a log cabin built in 1865 on the north side of the Valley near Yosemite Falls.

She grew to fame due to her tomboy ways, and often complained that she had not been born a boy. She played with lizards instead of dolls and rolled her own cigarettes when she was older.

She defied many conventions of her time. She rode bareback, camped and hiked alone; she greeted Yosemite visitors in "knee-high boots, trousers, a flowing cape, and a wide-brimmed hat" with an exuberant "Welcome, welcome!".

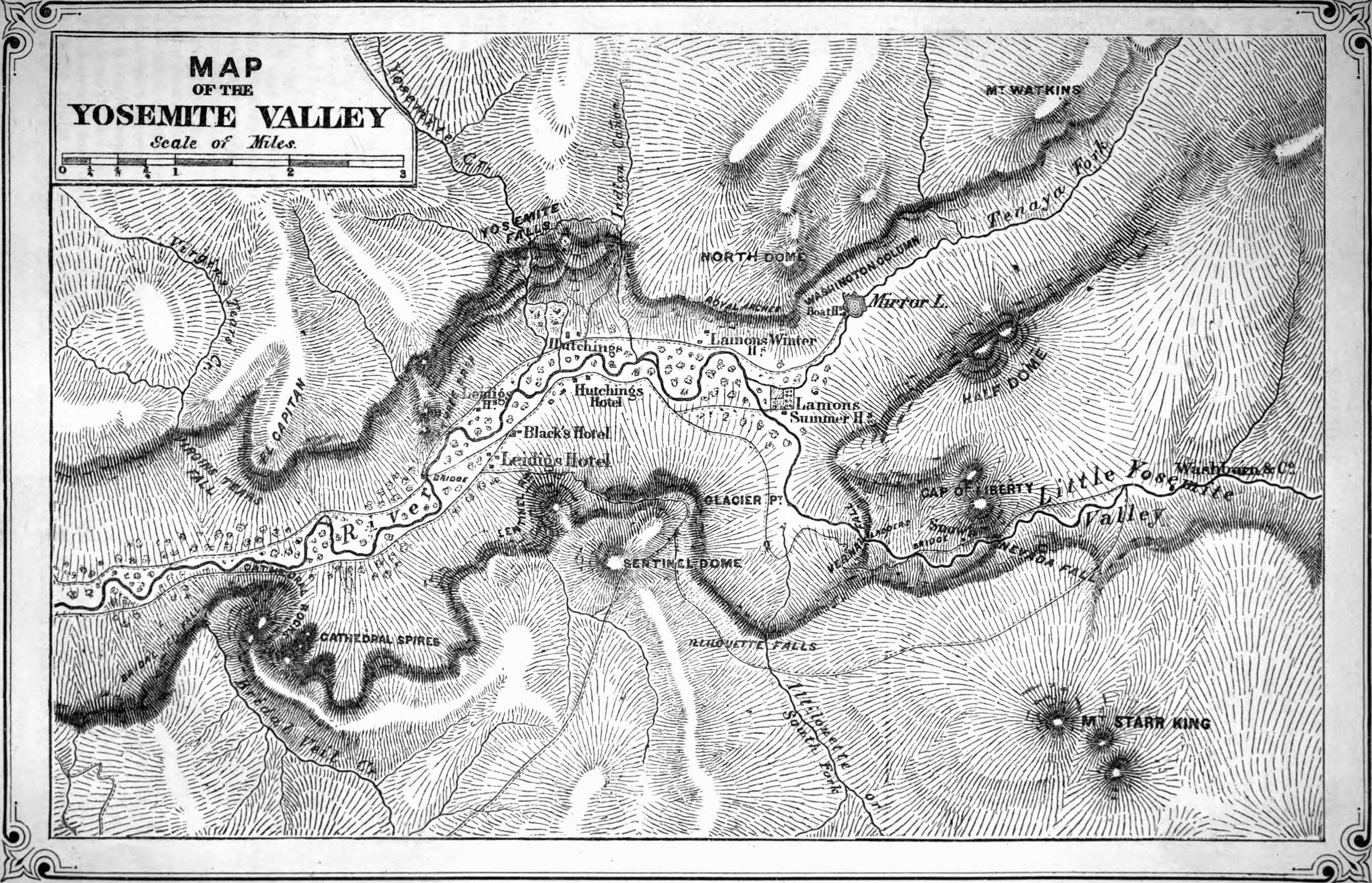
In front of Yosemite Falls, both Hutching's Cabin and Hutchings Hotel are visible. An 1879 map.

She was quite interested in religion, gladly helping out as a caretaker of the then-new Yosemite Valley Chapel. She "swept, dusted, decorated the church with wildflowers, laid out hymn books, and rang the bell to announce services when a minister visited."

Florence died when guiding a party to Glacier Point, on the Ledge Trail. According to one account a large boulder loosed and hit her. Her grave is in the Yosemite Cemetery, just east of Yosemite Falls. Her grave is "in the grove of noble oaks where Tissiac, Goddess of the Valley, keeps constant watch." It is marked "Aug. 23, 1864. Sept. 26, 1881. F. H."

== John Muir's observations on her ==
Of her, John Muir observed "Your Squirrel [Florence Hutchings] is very happy. She is a rare creature."

He also noted

To David Gilrye Muir

Balmy Sabbath Morning in Yosemite
April 10th, [1870]

Dear Brother:
Your geographical, religious and commercial letter was handed me this morning by a little black-eyed witch of a girl [Florence Hutchings], the only one the Valley...

== Legacy ==
Yosemite's Mount Florence 12,567 feet (3,830 m) was named for her. John Muir was credited with saying of her, "Let us give the girl, for her own and her father's sake, some graceful mountain height, and let it be called 'Mount Florence'."

A fictional account of her life is in the coming-of-age novel Call Me Floy.

== See also ==
- Carleton Watkins
- Charles Leander Weed
- Chief Tenaya
- Dean Potter
- Eadweard Muybridge
- Frederick Law Olmsted
- Galen Clark
- Mariposa War
- Yosemite National Park

== External links and references ==
- Cowgirl Magazine of Florence Hutchings
- Yosemite Pioneer Cemetery on Florence Hutchings
- Growing up in Yosemite on Florence Hutchings
- FindaGrave on Florence Hutchings
