= George Fiske =

American photographer (1835–1918)

- Born: October 22, 1835; Amherst, New Hampshire, U.S.
- Died: October 21, 1918 (aged 82)
- Resting place: Yosemite Cemetery
- Occupation: landscape photographer

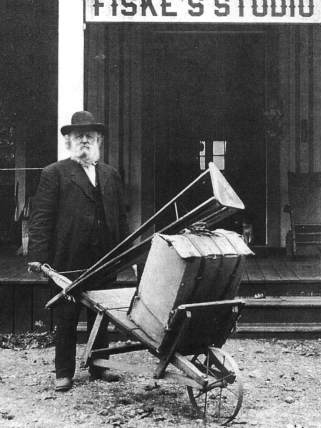
Fiske outside of his studio

George Fiske (October 22, 1835 – October 21, 1918) was an American landscape photographer.

== Biography ==
Fiske was born on October 22, 1835, in Amherst, New Hampshire. He moved west with his brother to San Francisco. He apprenticed under Charles L. Weed and worked with Carleton E. Watkins, both early Yosemite National Park photographers.

Fiske and his wife moved to Yosemite in 1879 and lived there until he committed suicide in 1918. Fiske was living alone when he shot himself, and he often told his neighbors he was "tired of living." Most of his negatives were destroyed when his house burned in 1904.

== Legacy ==
Years later, when photographer Ansel Adams was a boy, his Aunt Mary gave him a copy of James M. Hutchings, In the Heart of the Sierras (1888) when he was sick. The book piqued his interest enough to persuade his parents to vacation in Yosemite National Park in 1916. Most of the photographs in the book are by George Fiske.

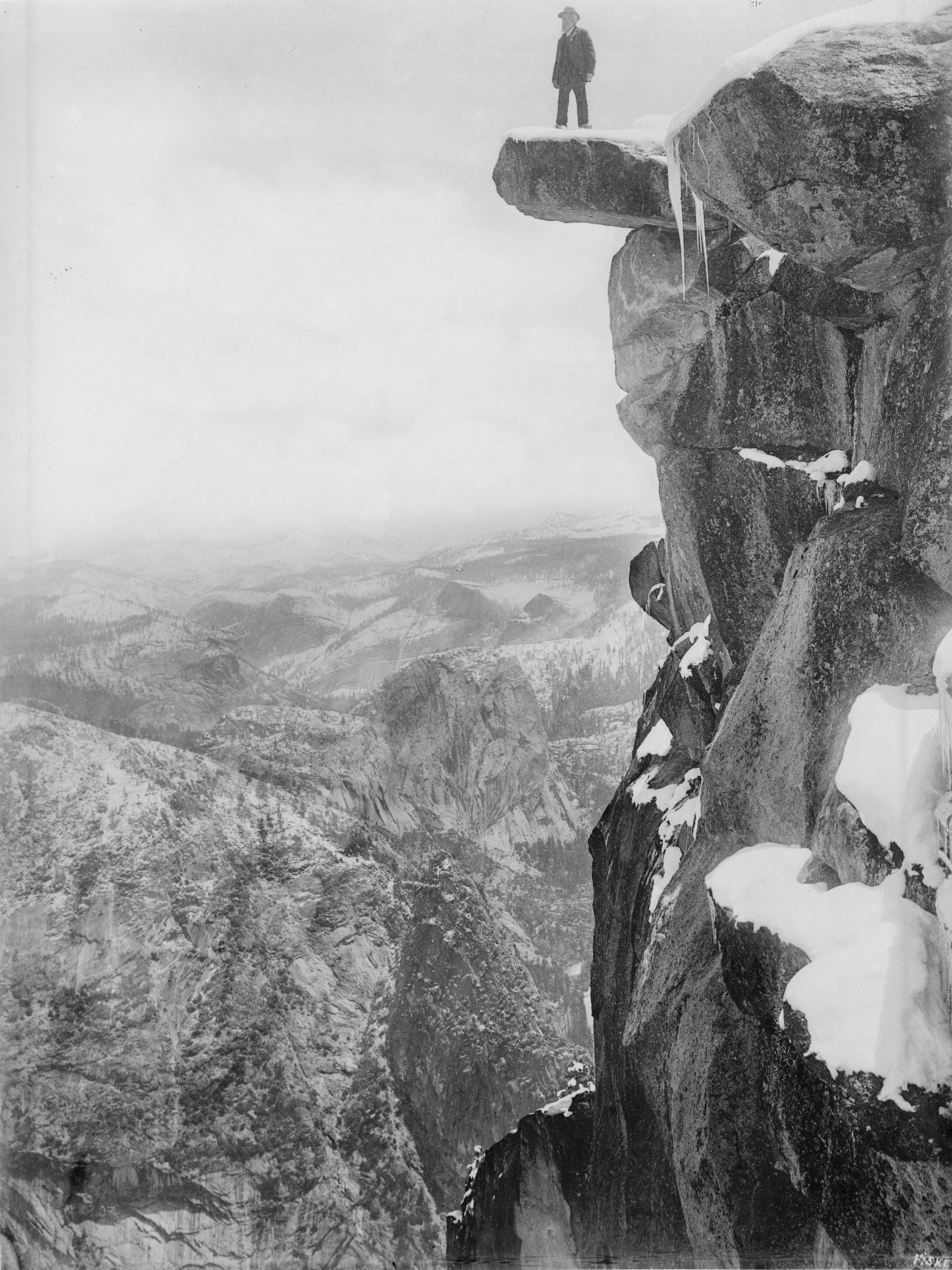
Galen Clark standing on Overhanging Rock, Glacier Point. Photograph by George Fiske

After Fiske's death, his remaining negatives were acquired by the Yosemite Park Company and stored neglected in a sawmill attic, which burned in 1943. Ansel Adams suggested they be stored safely in the Yosemite Museum fireproof basement, but his suggestion was ignored. "If that hadn't happened", said Adams, "Fiske could have been revealed today, I firmly believe, as a top photographer, a top interpretive photographer. I really can’t get excited at [Carleton] Watkins and [Eadweard] Muybridge—I do get excited at Fiske. I think he had the better eye." (Hickman & Pitts, 1980).
