= Arthur Clarence Pillsbury =

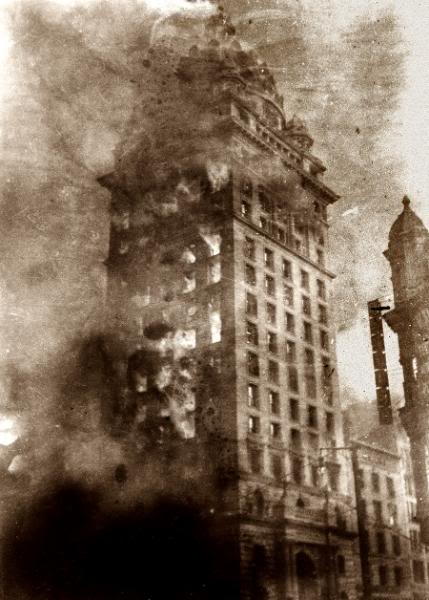
Pillsbury's photo of The San Francisco Call building burning on April 18, following the 1906 San Francisco earthquake

Arthur Clarence Pillsbury (1870–1946) was a United States photographer, inventor, and filmmaker, known through his innovations which extended human vision at a critical time in our history. Although many make the mistake of focusing on his sensational landscapes of Yosemite National Park, photos of the 1906 San Francisco earthquake, and time-lapse photography of flowers, he had seen the potential of film for rapidly increasing our understanding in every part of science.

The son of physicians, Pillsbury was born in Medford, Massachusetts His family relocated to Auburn, California in 1883, and he became a student at Stanford University. In 1895, he rode to Yosemite by bicycle with his cousin Bernard Lane and another friend from Stanford.

Pillsbury's career spilled over into nearly every kind of application for photography. His career began in 1895 when as a student he documented in one hour with 60 different images the first fraternity rush at Stanford University. Pillsbury studied mechanical engineering at Stanford University and is credited with the invention of a specimen slicer (for microscopy) before leaving college. Two years later he invented the first circuit panorama camera and soon after took it to the Yukon to capture the opening of the mining fields and towns. By 1900 he had photographed many of the notable features of the Western United States. By 1909, the year he made the first nature movie, he had moved into the role of filmmaking which would take science to an entirely different level. His book, Picturing Miracles of Plant and Animal Life, published by J. B. Lippincott Co., 1937 takes the reader through a series of his most important inventions which changed how we see the world. None of his inventions were patented, instead, Pillsbury believed 'Knowledge Commons' optimized the use of innovations which would advance our access to information and encourage innovations.

== Yosemite ==
He arrived in Yosemite for the first time by bicycle in 1895 while still a student in mechanical engineering at Stanford University. He had been drawn there by stories from an old friend of his mother's Susan B. Anthony, who was then making a tour through California speaking on the issue of women's suffrage. The young man fell in love with Yosemite and in 1897 bought a studio there. But his young wife refused to spend summers in the wilderness and left him. Despondent, he took his newly finished senior project, the first circuit panorama camera, and went to the Yukon where he photographed the opening of the mining towns and fields.

Pillsbury often visited Yosemite after returning to the lower 48 in 1899. There he photographed John Muir for Camera Craft Magazine in 1901, Galen Clark, George Fiske, and Theodore Roosevelt. These and other photos were later published as postcards by the Pillsbury Picture Company. Pillsbury had begun producing post cards with his photos as soon as this innovative form of communication was authorized by the United States Congress in 1898.

In the aftermath of the 1906 San Francisco earthquake and fire, and the income from his photos, Pillsbury, who had just quit his job with the San Francisco Examiner to found the Pillsbury Picture Company, was able to fulfill his long-time ambition to buy a studio in Yosemite and purchased the Studio of the Three Arrows later that same year. His background in biology and botany, encouraged by his parents who were both medical doctors, made him aware of the steady reduction in the number and types of wild flowers that blossomed in the meadows there. So in 1912 he built the first lapse-time camera, made the first nature movie showing the dance of a flower raising its face to the sun and managed to persuade the National Park Service to stop the practice of mowing the meadows to produce fodder for their horses.

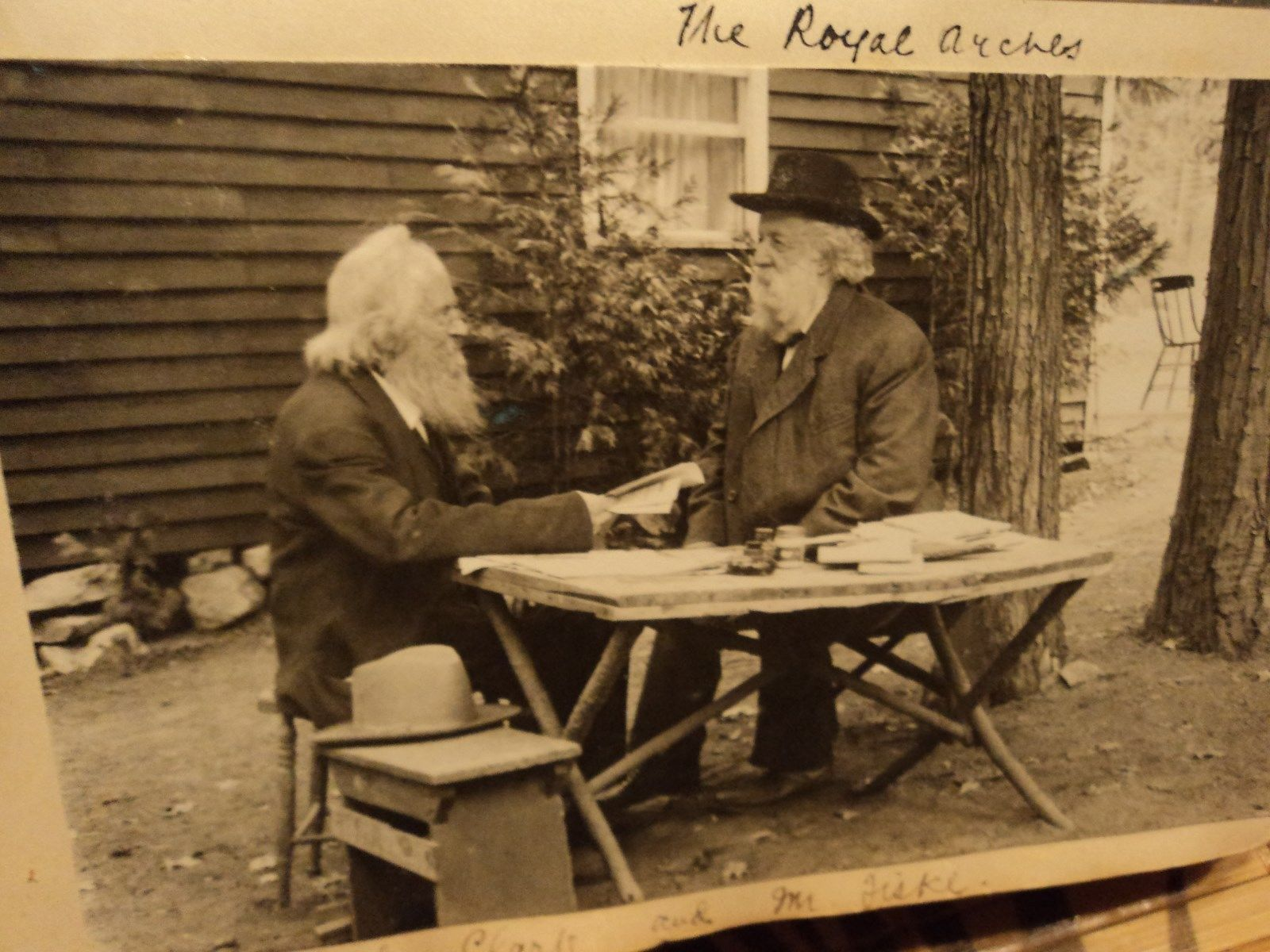
Photograph of George Fiske and Galen Clark

His specimen cards of flowers, hand tinted at the studio, were as often framed as used in the meadows to identify the many types of plants blooming there. His work in Yosemite included both the classical production photos of such artists as Adams, d'orotones that had the depth and clarity of holograms, and his own unique work with flowers and also his candids of the people of Yosemite. That, with his inventions which later included the first microscopic motion picture camera, "Sunset Magazine, May 1927", the X-Ray motion picture camera and the first underwater motion picture camera, "Picturing Miracles of Plant and Animal Life and Popular Science, January 1929", were used on his extensive lecture tours to all the major forums and universities in the United States, England and the South Seas. His many nature films, eventually shown in theaters as well as in schools, clubs and for his lecture tours awakened the public to the need for conservation in the wake of Muir's death in 1914. Pillsbury gave advice to photographers for shooting pictures at Yosemite National Park in a 1921 handbook.

His first major use of his panorama camera were the many panoramas taken documenting the Yukon gold rush. In 1899, on his second trip to the Yukon, the first having taken place the year before, 1898, Pillsbury made a solo journey from the headwaters of the Yukon River to the Pacific Ocean of 1,981 miles, Skagway to Nome, Alaska. He also used the panorama for vertical photos of nature, many of these created as d'orotones. Over his career he invented multiple still format and motion picture cameras, 21 have been documented to date. These included the first lapse-time camera, used to record the life cycle of plants from the time they emerged from the ground through blossoming, germination and death. Work on this camera began in 1910. CineMicroscopy, flower dramatics, were popular in theaters and schools from primary to university for decades.

== 1906 San Francisco earthquake and fire ==
He used panorama and conventional cameras to capture the panorama images that went around the world in the immediate aftermath of the 1906 San Francisco earthquake and fire. He worked for the San Francisco Examiner as a photojournalist from 1903 to March 1906, but left to establish the Pillbury Picture Company, based in Oakland, just a month before the earthquake.

Pillsbury later recalled that he still had his Examiner press pass when the earthquake hit the following month, and he knew many of the policemen, so was able to gain access to good locations to photograph panoramas of the burning city. He took photos using several cameras. One of these was the swinging lens circuit servomechanism panoramic camera which he invented as his senior project in mechanical engineering at Stanford University in 1897. There is a link to the Library of Congress, and multiple other sources for these on the Foundation website ACPillsburyFoundation.com.

== More innovations ==
In 1925, Pillsbury first showed the film from his invention of the microscopic motion picture camera, a tandem inline, high magnification unprecedented scientific achievement. These were followed by his invention in 1929 of the first X-Ray motion picture camera which revolutionized pre-operative surgery; he put such inventions into what he called Knowledge Commons to ensure these would not be slowed down in application by attempts to profit from this advance in human understanding of the life beyond human sight. In 1930, he invented the first undersea motion picture camera and became the first filmmaker to use it. This historic filming took place in Pago-Pago Bay, American Samoa. Pillsbury used a color matching index with Pathecolor and at this time Technicolor, learned from his earlier work with flowers. This was also the first lapse-time movie recording the almost imperceptible movements of sea life, such as making star fish appear to dance. A short tribute movie on the ACPillsburyFoundation.com including this footage and other cinematic techniques such as aerial Cinematography applied to water falls in Yosemite, overcoming the early jerkiness of movie cameras and their flicker. The Foundation's website includes menus taking you to cited sources about his over 70 motion pictures, panoramas in the Library of Congress and other sources, with articles extracted from 3 Million pages of scanned magazines and catalogues from 1898 - the 1940s, citing his "how to" techniques pioneering the early history of film that are useful today.

Popular Mechanics issue with an article about Pillsbury's work on pages 710-713 (readable pdf)

For smaller formats he preferred 5 X 7 Graflex images. developed them at his new home based business in Oakland, and sent them to many major newspapers around the world on the photo-wire facsimile machines he innovated for Hearst Newspapers 1903 - 1906. . He became world famous through this work of photojournalism, which also led to his championship of John Muir in Muir's battle to save the Hetch Hetchy Valley in the western part of Yosemite National Park from becoming a reservoir for the profit of San Francisco real estate, water and electric power developers.

Pillsbury's approach for saving the Hetch Hetchy was cinema, which from this time on became his focused specialization and advocacy, opposed to the then defining terms of 'Conservationism' vs. 'Preservationism'. Conservationism, as defined by its primary advocate Gifford Pinchot, who Muir had broken with a decade earlier, meant, actually, 'keep it until we need to use it'. Preservationism meant perpetual private property trusts vs. multi-use by public lands with politicians having many constituencies who overrun rare life forms from Sequoias to Wild Flowers. In an act that violated these principles the Hetch Hetchy Valley was traded to San Francisco by in a competition between presidential candidates Woodrow Wilson and Teddy Roosevelt for votes.

Pillsbury's 1912 movie, "Plant and Animal Life in Yosemite" was shown to the superintendents of the National Parks at their annual conference, which was held from October 14–16, 1912.

In the aftermath of the earthquake, he returned to a career as a landscape photographer when he purchased a studio in Yosemite Valley. During this period he also produced art photographs and started using motion picture cameras, producing the first nature films which he showed in Yosemite at his Studio of the Three Arrows. Here is also invented the first lapse-time motion picture camera for the specific purpose of saving the wild flowers of Yosemite that were then threatened with extinction from excessive mowing.

His candid photos captured the sense of wonder experienced by people in Yosemite as they saw its natural beauties. His inventions in later life included the microscopic motion picture camera, the X-Ray Motion picture camera and the underwater motion picture camera. His work was done without filters because his background as a photojournalist and his life philosophy had led him to the conviction that his job was to produce images and let the viewer bring to that experience the interpretation that Life, Wildlife, and Nature are to be respected because humanity is part of the natural world and not its dominator, free to consume at will, or its creator.

== Missouri Botanical Garden ==
In 1927 Pillsbury oversaw the establishment and operation of a time lapse film studio at the Missouri Botanical Garden in St. Louis, Missouri for the purpose of plant study and botanical research.

== Legacy ==
Four of Pillsbury's orotone photographs of Yosemite waterfalls were part of an exhibition on the art of Yosemite which appeared at the Autry National Center, the Oakland Museum of California, the Nevada Museum of Art and the Eiteljorg Museum of American Indians and Western Art from 2006 to 2008.

His granddaughter Melinda Pillsbury-Foster, wrote a biography of Pillsbury.
