= Yosemite Cemetery =

Cemetery in Yosemite Valley

Coordinates: 37°44′56″N 119°35′20″W

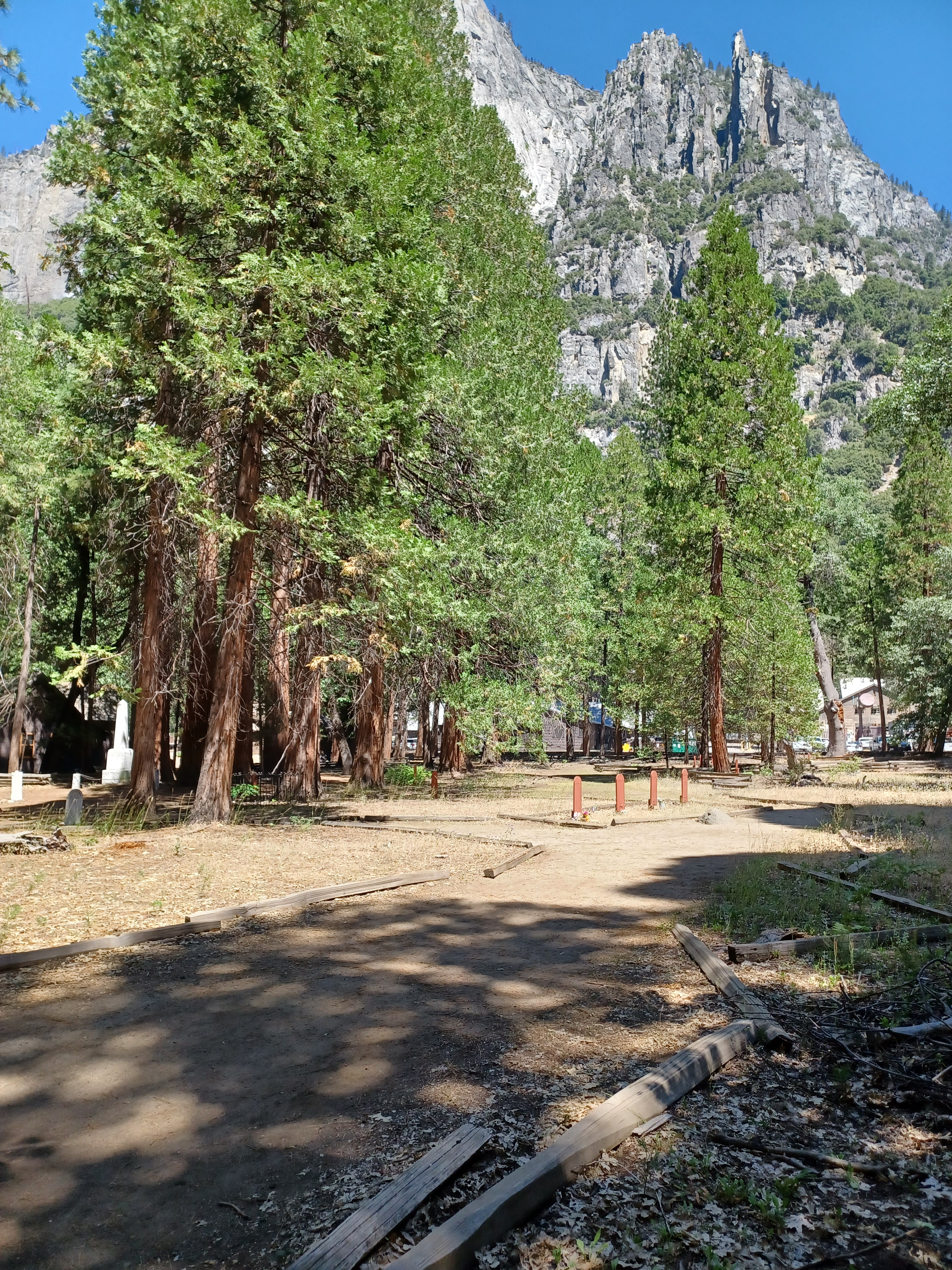
- Interactive map of Yosemite Cemetery

Details
- Established: 1870s
- Location: Yosemite Village, Mariposa County, California
- Country: United States
- Size: 0.25 arce
- No. of graves: approx. 60 graves
- Find a Grave: Yosemite Cemetery

Yosemite Cemetery, also known as Pioneer Cemetery, is a cemetery built in the 1870s and located on the west end of Yosemite Village, in Mariposa County, California. In 2014, the Yosemite Conservancy worked in restoring the cemetery and graves. Many of the graves are from the earliest European-descent pioneers, and a few of the graves were for Native Americans that had lived in the valley.

== Notable burials ==
- George Anderson (1835–1884), first person to summit Half Dome in 1875.
- Lucy Brown, one of the few Native American survivors of the Mariposa Battalion's 1851 raid of Yosemite Valley.
- Galen Clark (1814–1910), writer and conservationist
- George Fiske (1835–1918), landscape photographer.
- Florence Hutchings (1864 – 1881), the first non-Ahwahnechee born in Yosemite Valley
- James Mason Hutchings (1820–1902), businessman.
- James Chenowith Lamon (1817–1875), the earliest person of European descent to settle in Yosemite Valley in 1860.
- Forest Sanford Townsley (1882–1943), chief ranger at Yosemite National Park for 27 years.

== Gallery ==
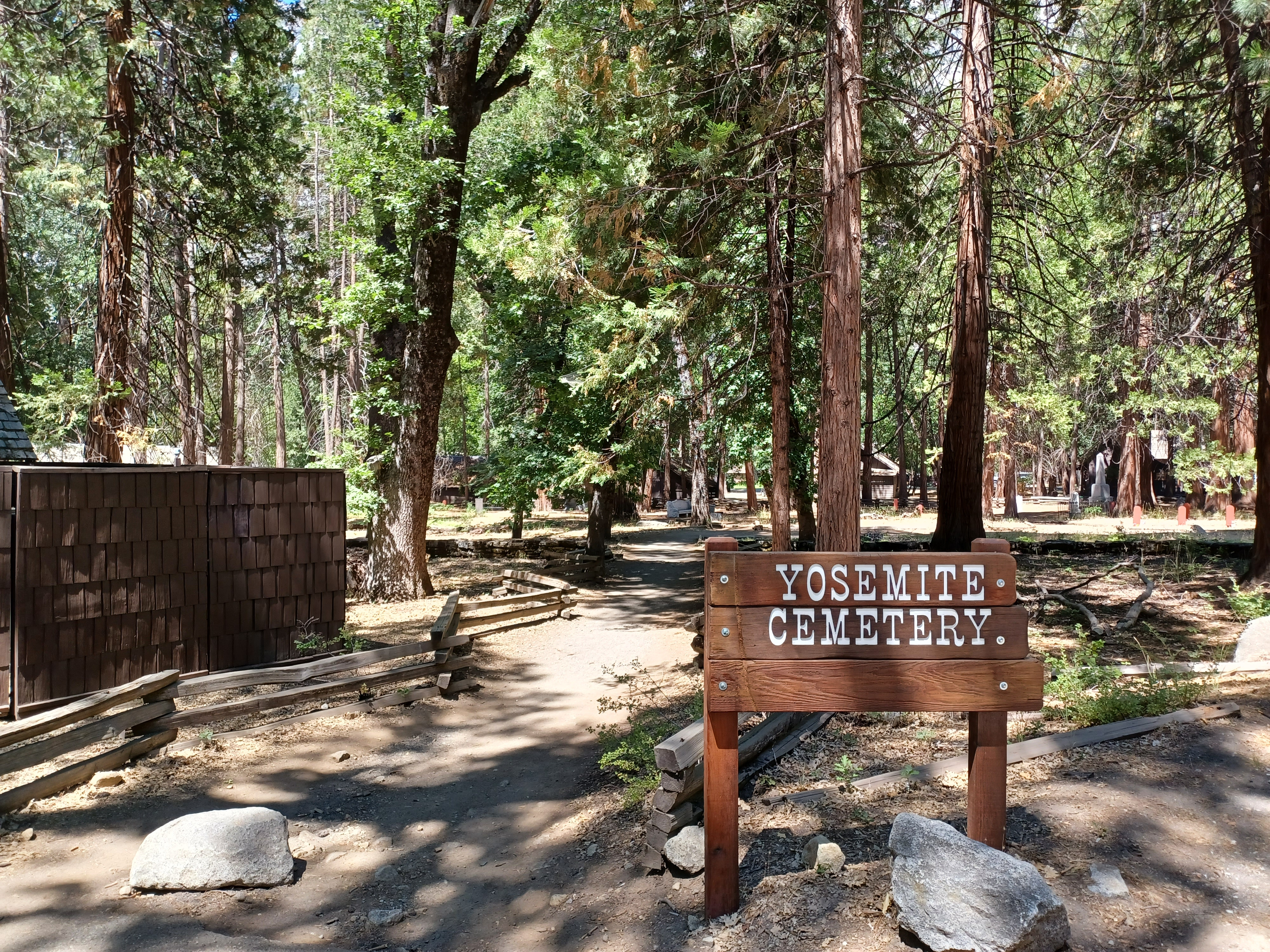

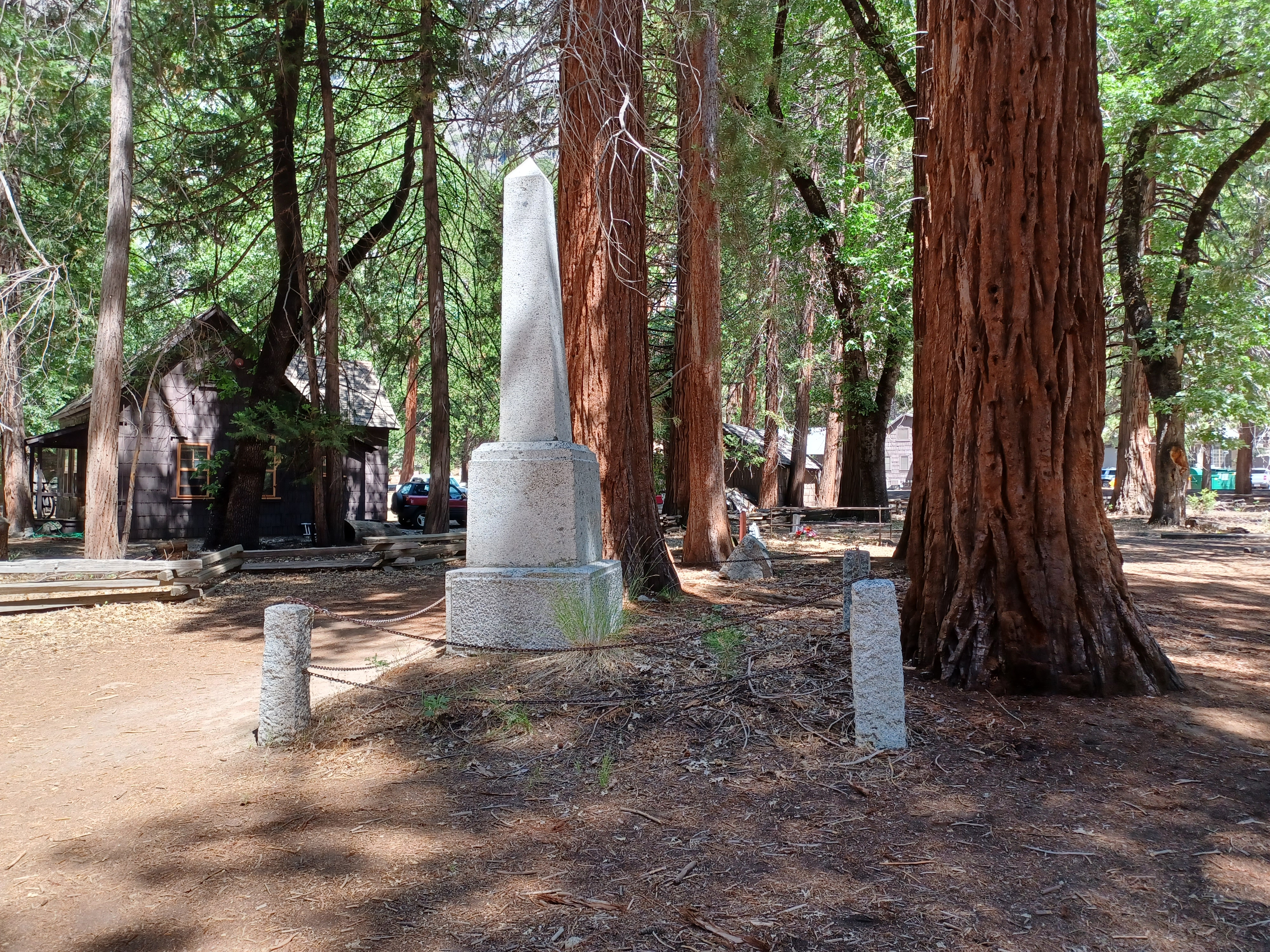

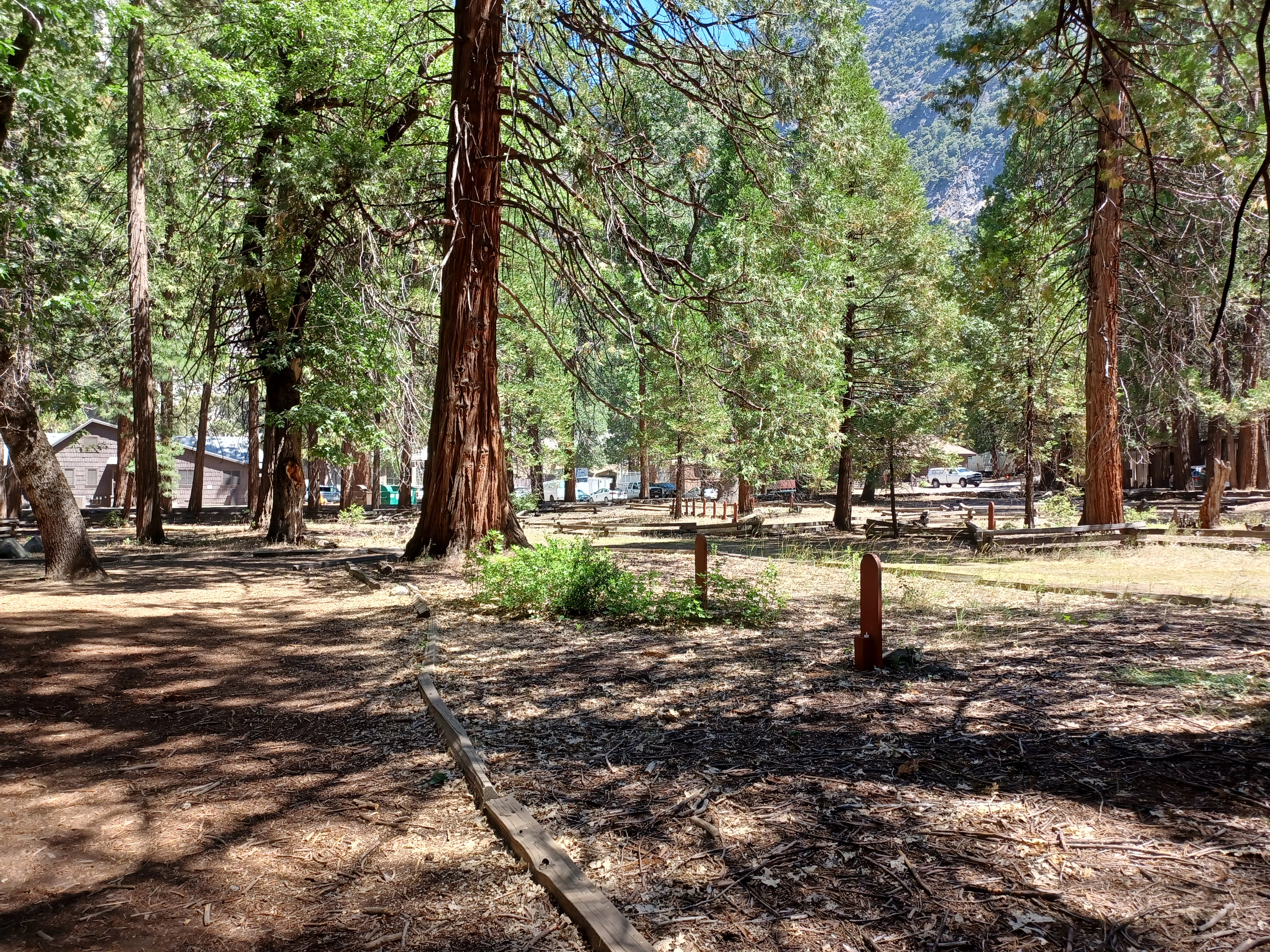

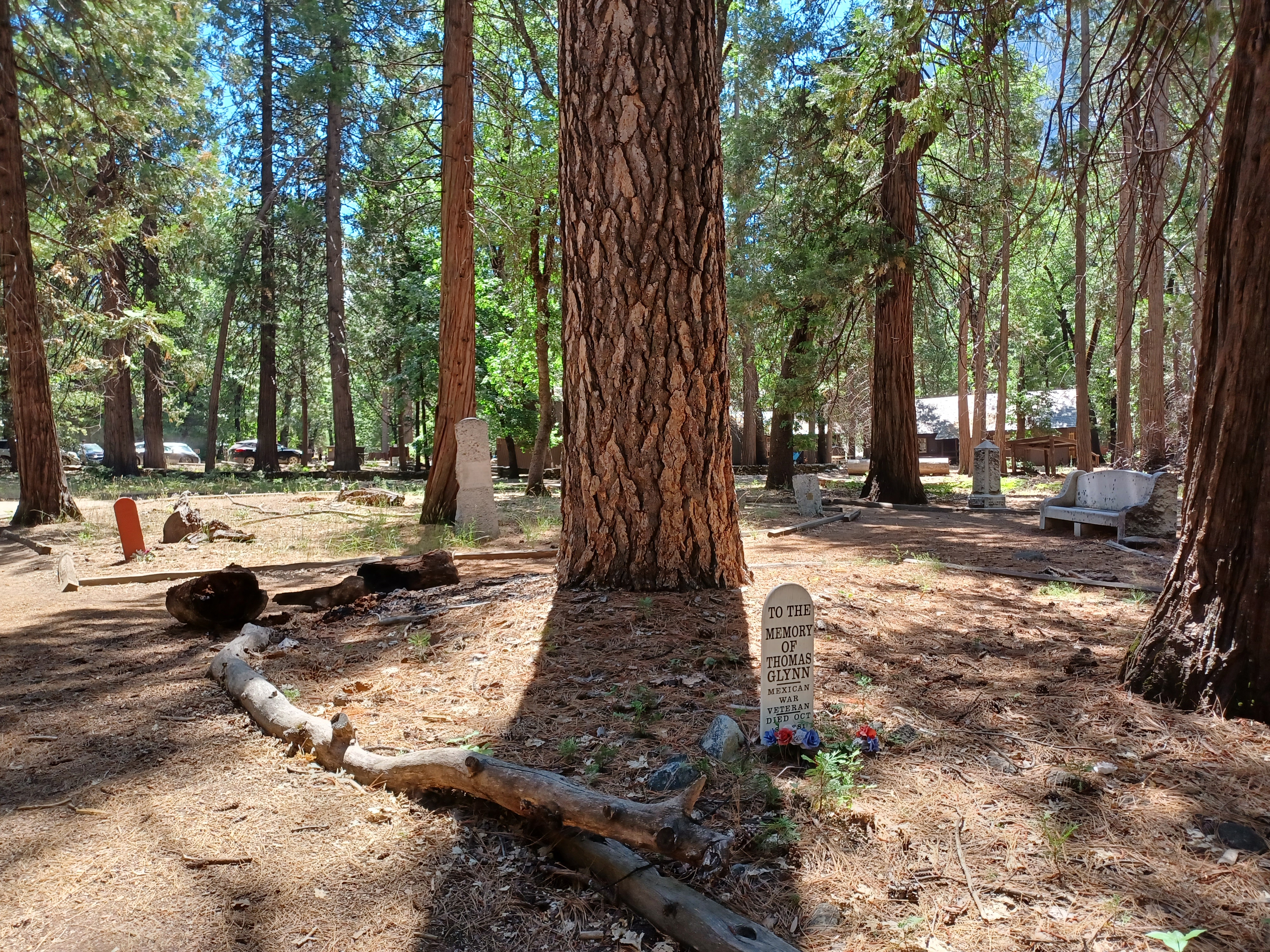

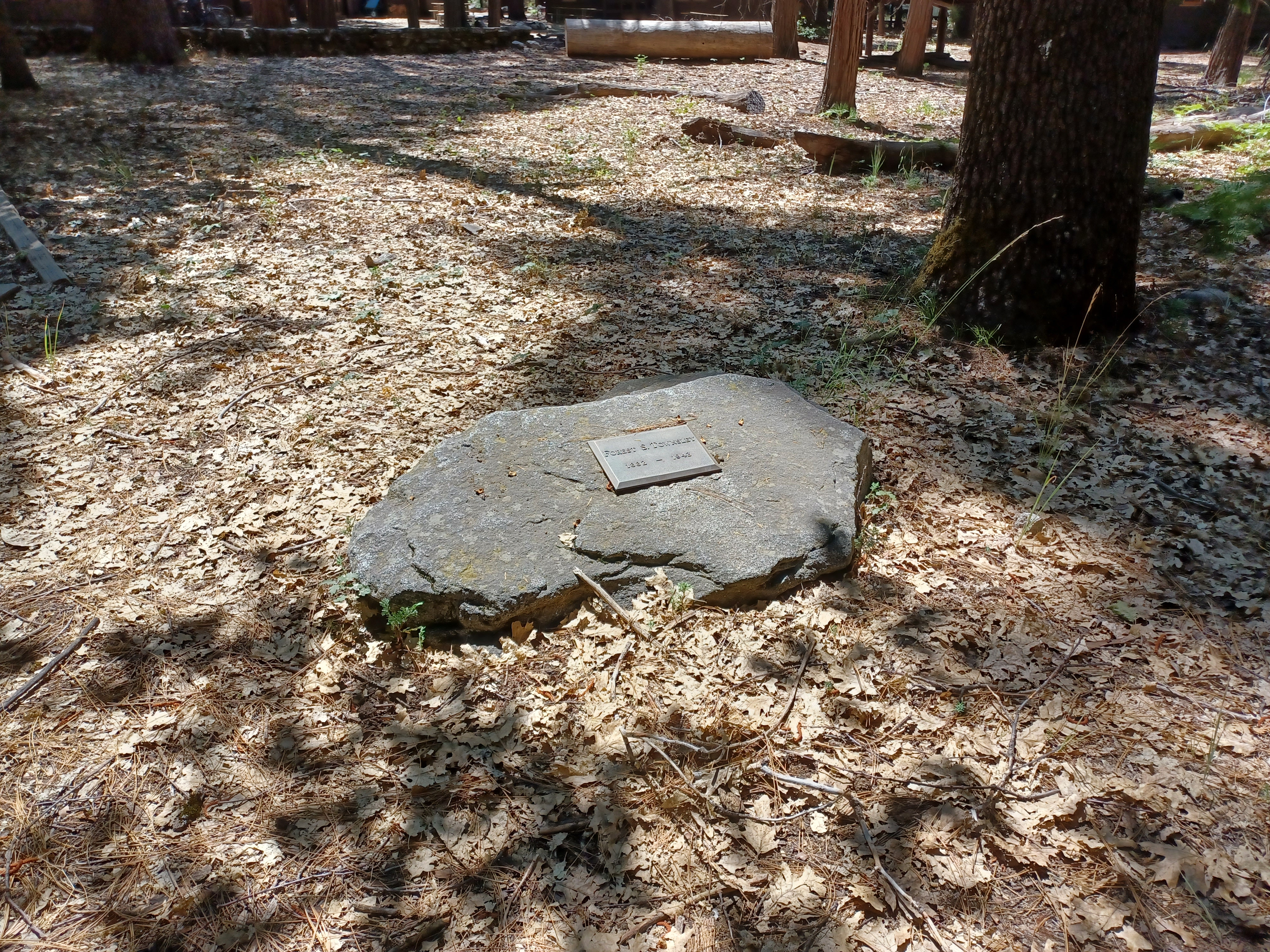

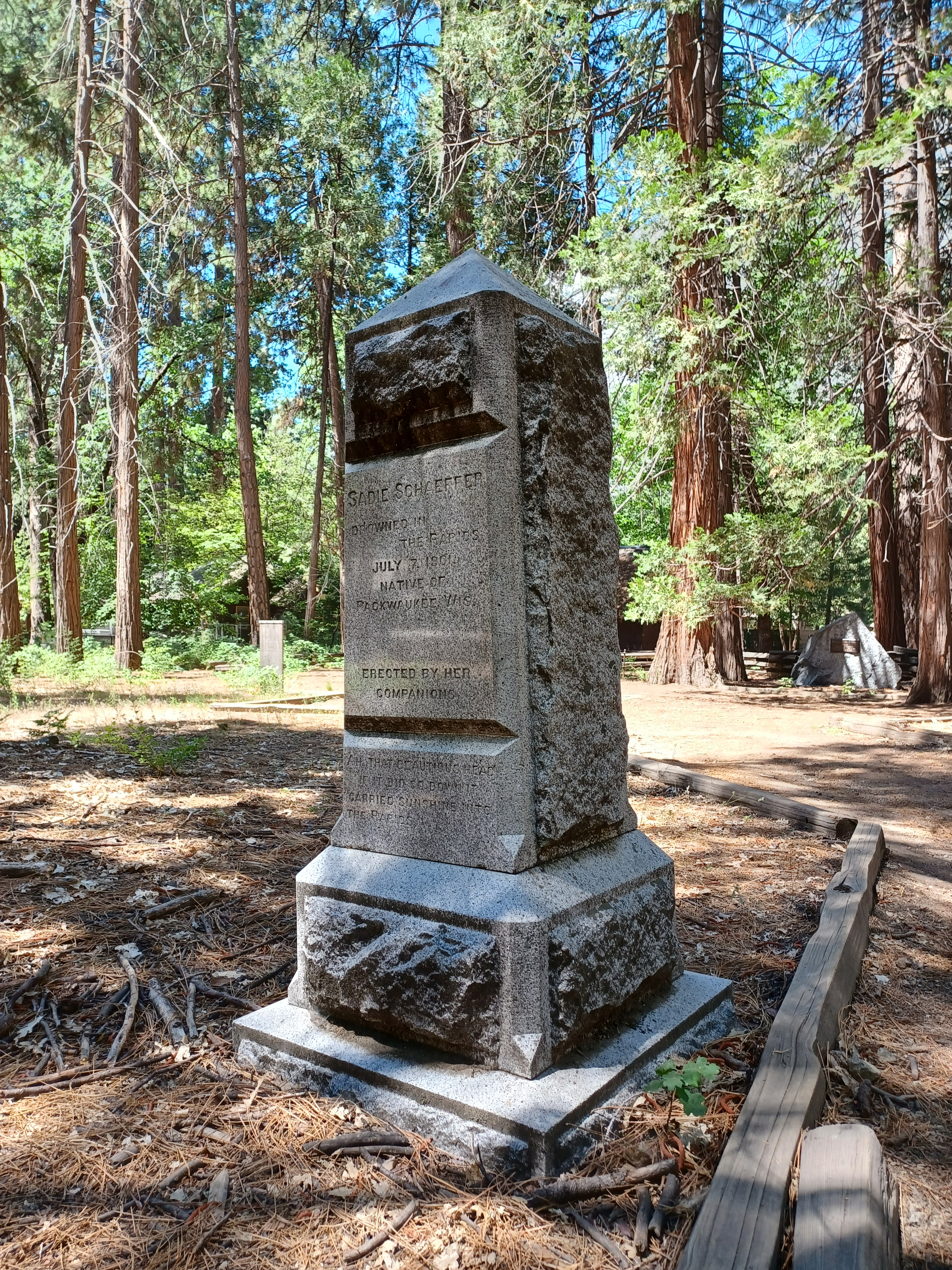

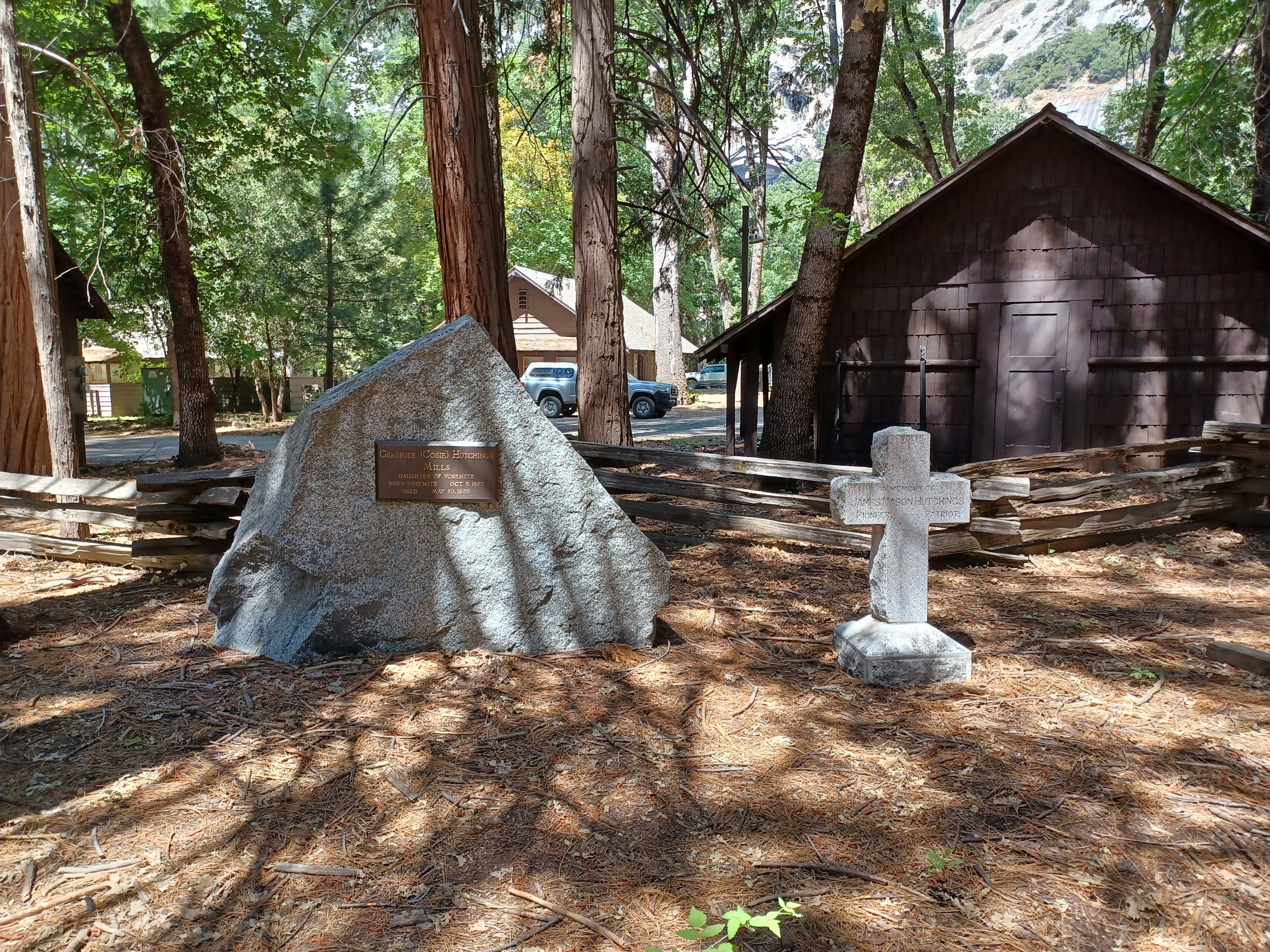

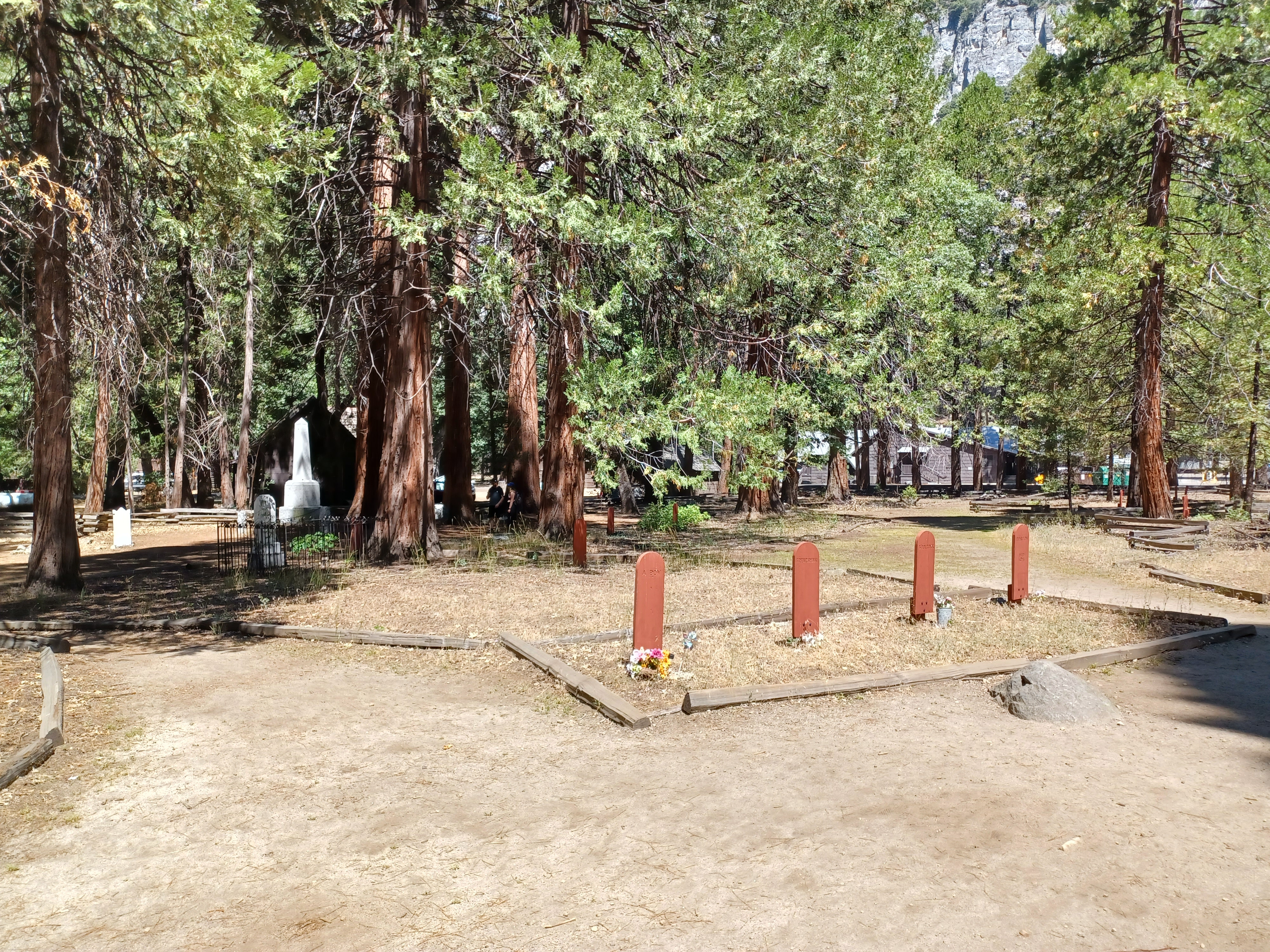

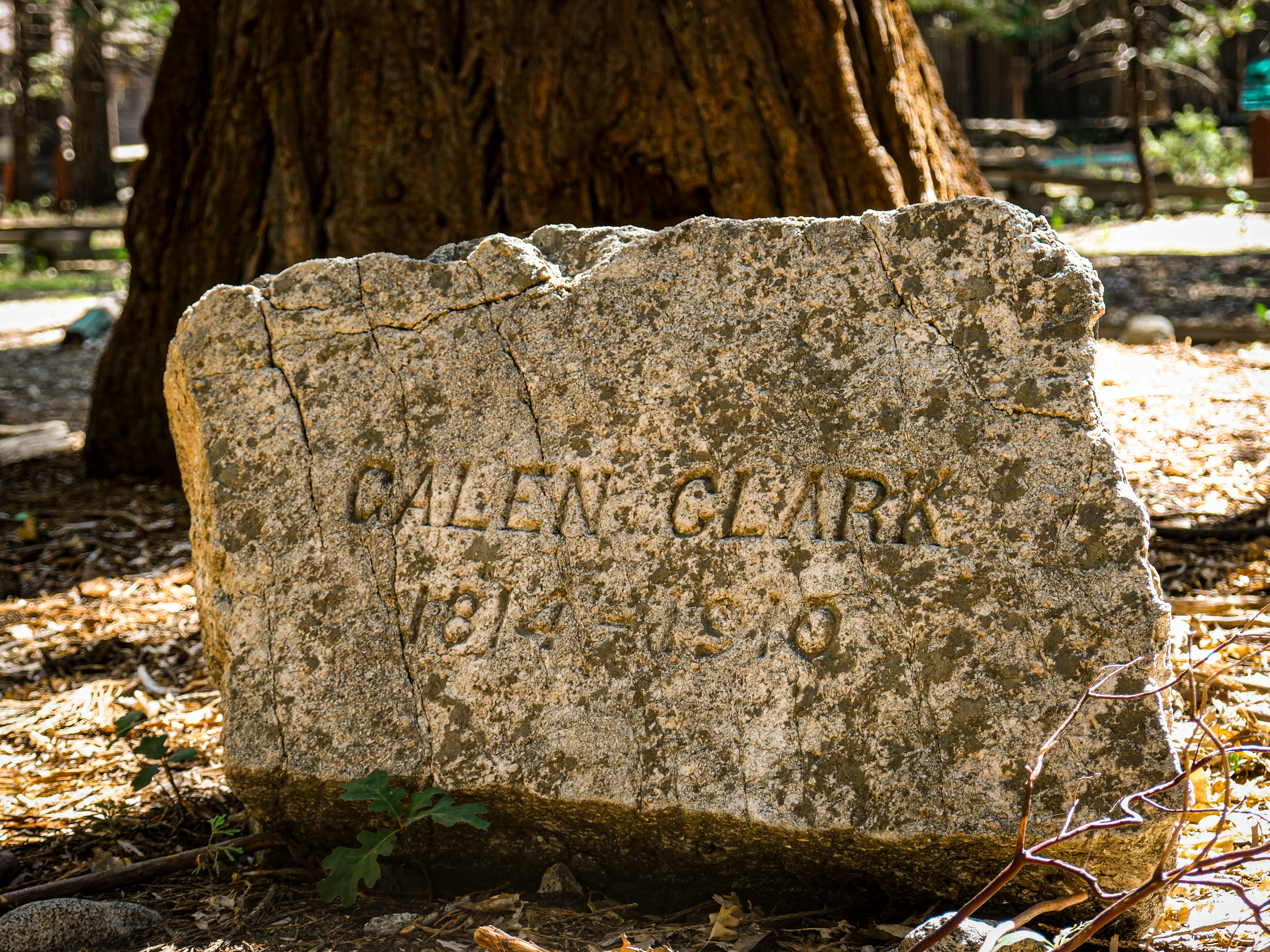

== See also ==
- List of cemeteries in California
- Pioneer cemetery
