= Simmons Peak =

Mountain in Yosemite National Park, USA

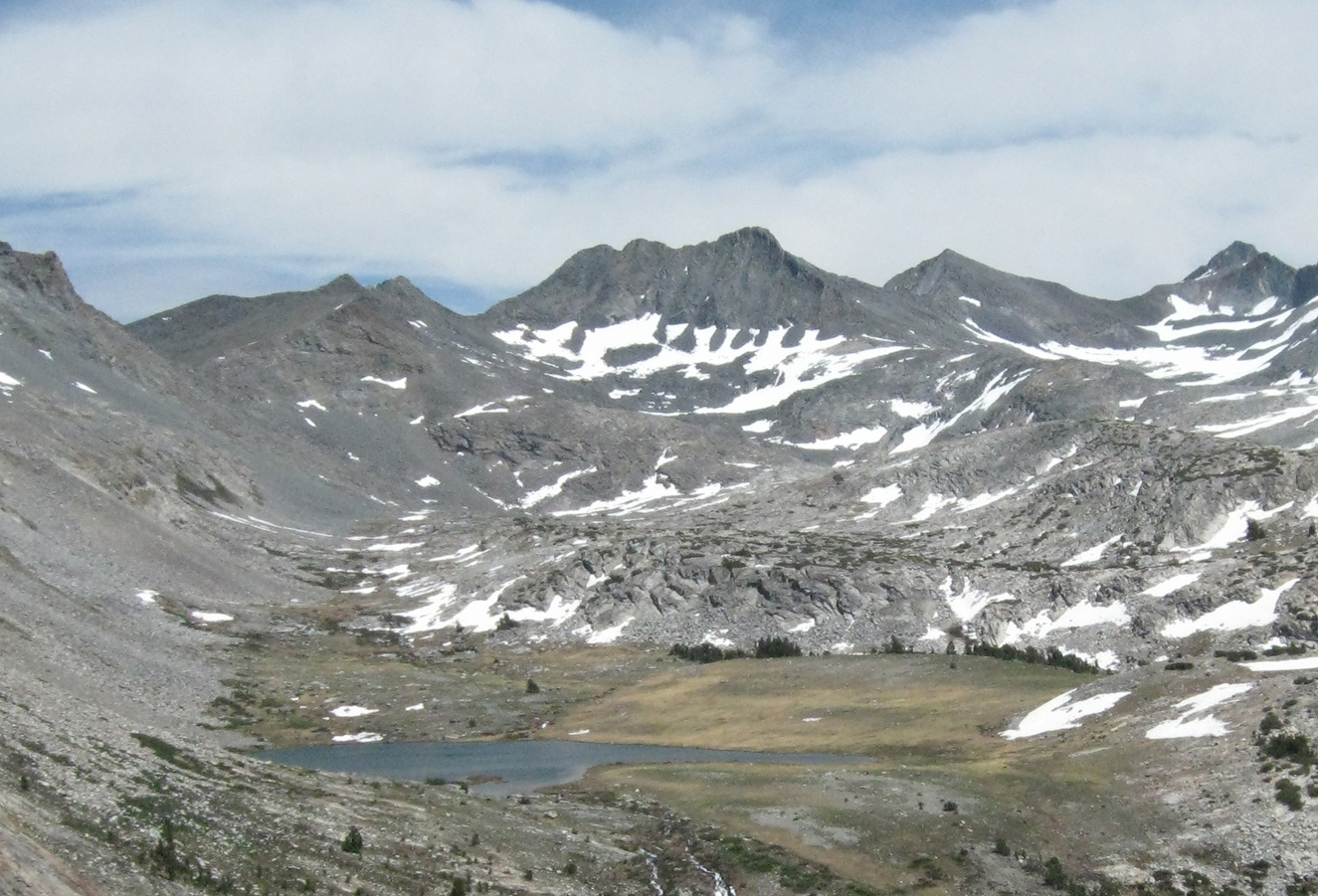
- Northwest aspect, from Vogelsang Pass

Highest point
- Elevation: 12,567 ft (3,830 m) NAVD 88
- Prominence: 377 ft (115 m)
- Parent peak: Mount Maclure
- Coordinates: 37°45′39″N 119°17′40″W

Geography
- Location within California Location within the United States
- Location: Madera and Tuolumne counties, California, U.S.
- Parent range: Ritter Range, Cathedral Range; Sierra Nevada
- Topo map(s): USGS Mount Florence, California

Climbing
- First ascent: Al Steck and George Steck
- Easiest route: scramble to class 4"Simmons Peak". SummitPost.org.

Simmons Peak is a mountain, in the Tuolumne Meadows region of Yosemite National Park. In difficulty, its routes range from scrambling to class 4. It is a few miles north of Mount Lyell.

Simmons Peak is the 12th-highest mountain in Yosemite, if not often climbed, partially due to its not being on the Sierra Club's Sierra Peaks Section SPS List.

== Near to Simmons Peak ==
All of the following are near, to Simmons Peak:

Mountain	Distance
Parsons Peak	1.3 miles (2.1 km)
Mount Maclure	1.4 miles (2.3 km)
Amelia Earhart Peak	1.8 miles (2.9 km)
Mount Florence	1.9 miles (3.1 km)
Mount Lyell	1.9 miles (3.1 km)
