= Amelia Earhart Peak =

Summit in Tuolumne County, California

- Location within California Location within the United States

Highest point
- Elevation: 11,978 ft (3,651 m) NAVD 88
- Parent peak: Simmons Peak
- Coordinates: 37°47′11″N 119°17′18″W

Geography
- Location: Tuolumne County, California, U.S.
- Parent range: Sierra Nevada
- Topo map: USGS Vogelsang Peak

Amelia Earhart Peak is a summit in Tuolumne County, California, in the United States. With an elevation of 11,978 feet (3,651 m), Amelia Earhart Peak is the 304th highest summit in the state of California.

The summit was named in the 1960s for aviator Amelia Earhart.
