= Charles Leander Weed =

American photographer (1824–1903)

Charles Leander Weed was an American photographer, who was born in New York state on July 17, 1824, and died in Oakland, California on August 31, 1903. He is perhaps best known for being one of the earliest photographers, if not the first photographer, to enter and photograph what is now Yosemite National Park.

In 1854, during the California Gold Rush, Weed moved to Sacramento, California, and was a camera operator in the daguerreotype portrait studio of George J. Watson. In 1855, Weed adopted the wet collodion technique, and his photographs of Gold Rush miners and settlement were much admired.

Entrepreneur James Hutchings and others ventured into the area of what is now known as Yosemite Valley in 1855, becoming the Valley's first tourists. After returning to Mariposa Hutchings wrote an article about his experience which appeared in the August 9, 1855 issue of the Mariposa Gazette and was later published in various forms nationally.

Hutchings brought Weed to the Valley in the summer of 1859. Weed took the first known photographs of the Valley's features, and a September exhibition in San Francisco presented them to the public. Hutchings published four installments of "The Great Yo-semite Valley" from October 1859 to March 1860 in his magazine; these articles contained woodcuts based on Weed's photographs. A book by Hutchings titled Scenes of Wonder and Curiosity in California collected these articles and the book stayed in print well into the 1870s.

Beginning in 1860, Weed started extensive traveling, including trips to Hong Kong (where he briefly established a studio) and Hawaii. During his travels, he also visited Shanghai and Japan. He made two separate trips to Japan, one in 1867 and another in 1868. He is believed to be the first photographer to use a mammoth camera in Japan, and took photographs of Nagasaki, Edo, Yokohama and Kamakura. There are currently 72 of Weed's photographs of Japan known to survive, including 32 in public collections in Japan (20 half-stereo photographs at the Yokohama Archives of History; 3 mammoth size at Nihon University; and 9 stereo photographs at JCII Camera Museum), 31 portfolio size in a private collection in Japan (Okayama Yoji collection), and 9 in public collections outside of Japan (7 at the Canadian Centre for Architecture, all mammoth size; 2 at the Freer Gallery of Art, mammoth size; and 1 at the Wilson Centre for Photography, London, mammoth size). An exhibition of Weed's photographs of Japan was organized at the Yokohama Archives of History Jan. 28-March 12, 2023. There is an exhibition catalog.

Weed presented his work at the Paris Exposition Universelle, where he won an award for landscape photography.

In 1872, Weed made another visit to Yosemite, probably in the company of well-known Yosemite photographer Eadweard Muybridge. Weed concluded his career by working as a photoengraver.

== Family ==
Charles Leander Weed was born 1824 in Conesus, Livingston or Elmira, New York, the son of Royal Newland Weed and Ruth Austin. He married Sarah P. Irish on May 1, 1876, in Oakland, Alameda, California. He died August 31, 1903. Both are buried in Oakland. They had one known child Mary E Weed.

== Gallery ==
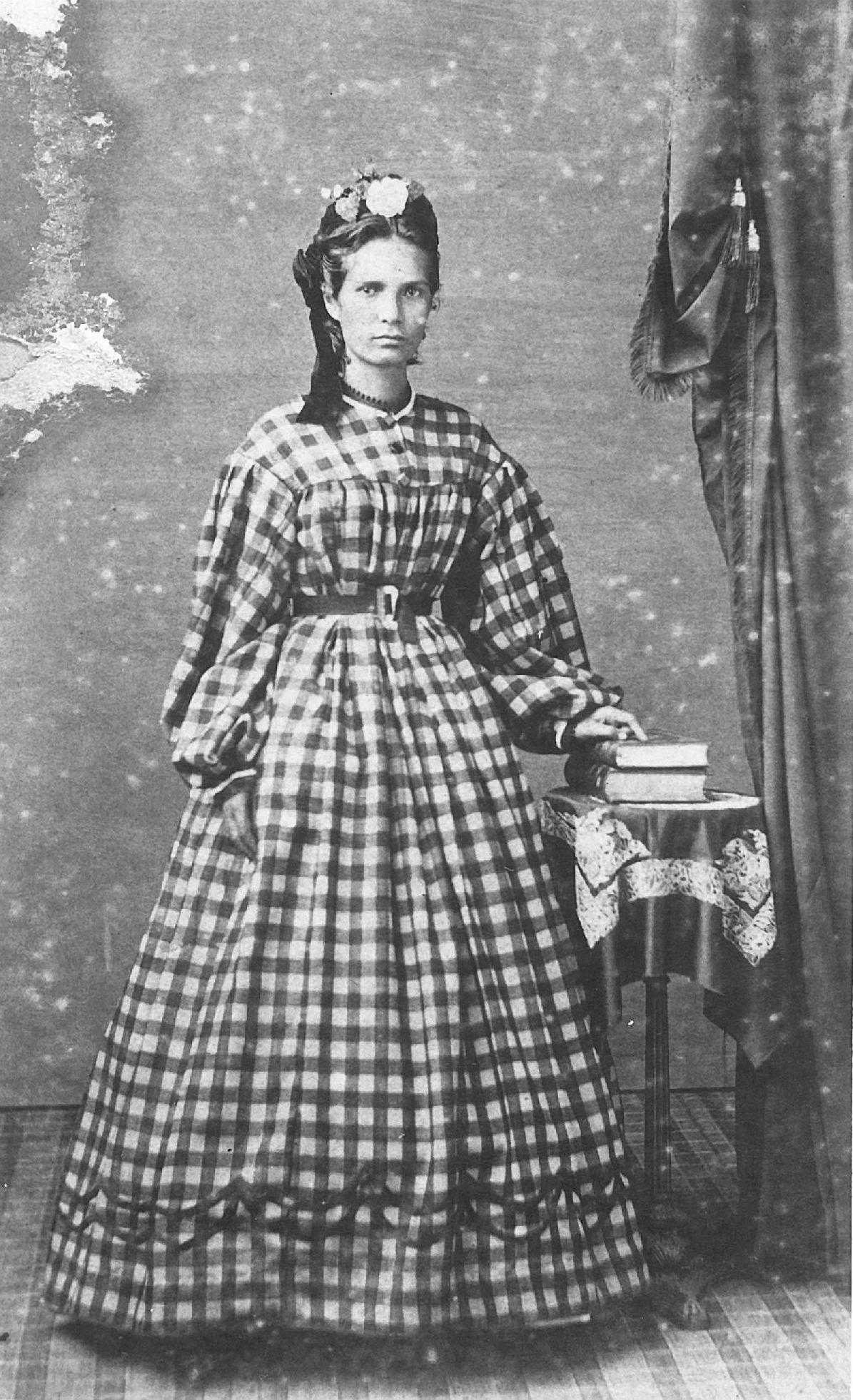
Emma Metcalf, photograph by Charles L. Weed, 1865.

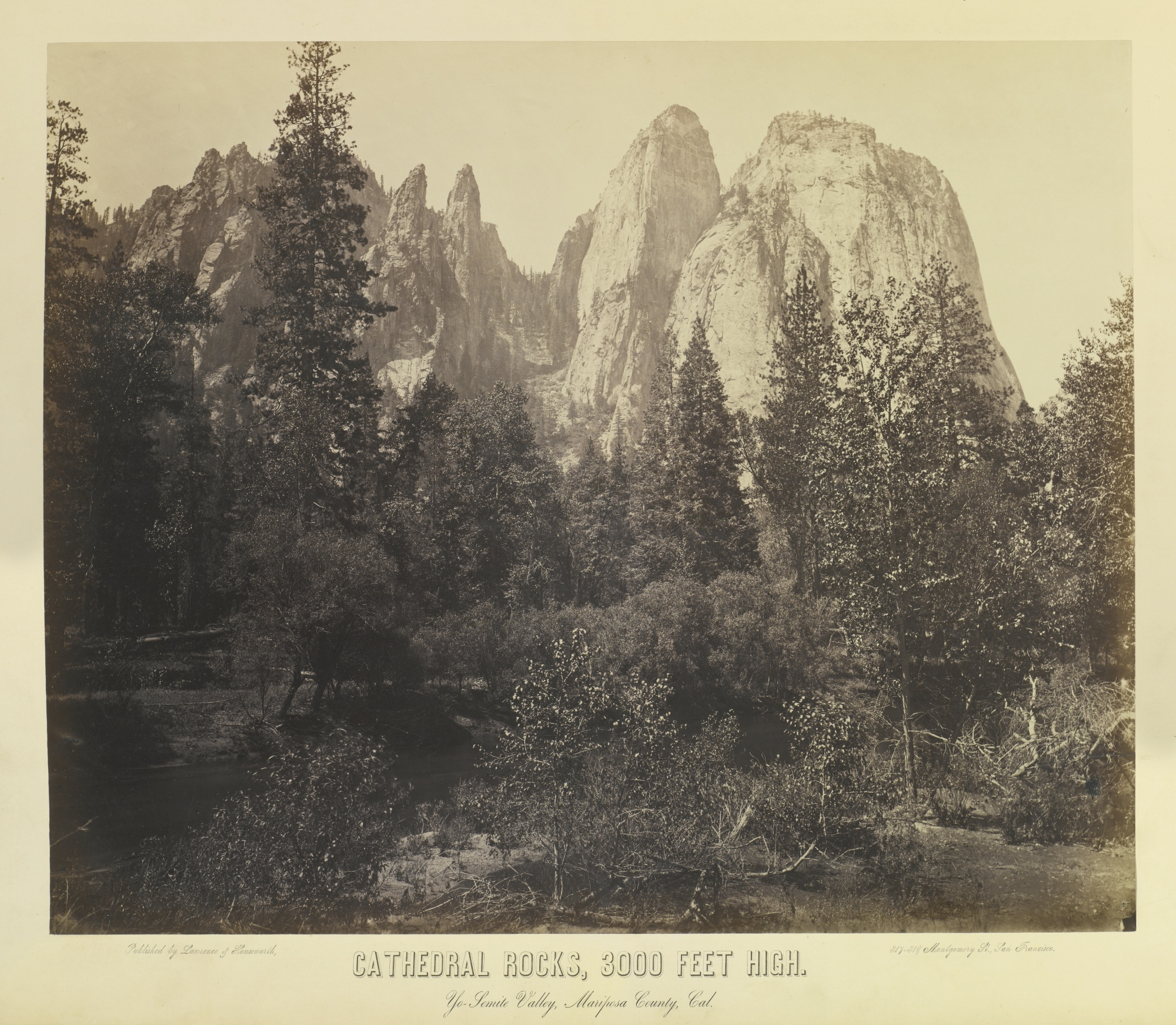
One of 30 mammoth-plate albumen prints of Yosemite Valley, and the Big Trees, Calaveras County, California taken in 1864 by Charles Leander Weed
