= Parsons Peak =

Mountain in California, United States

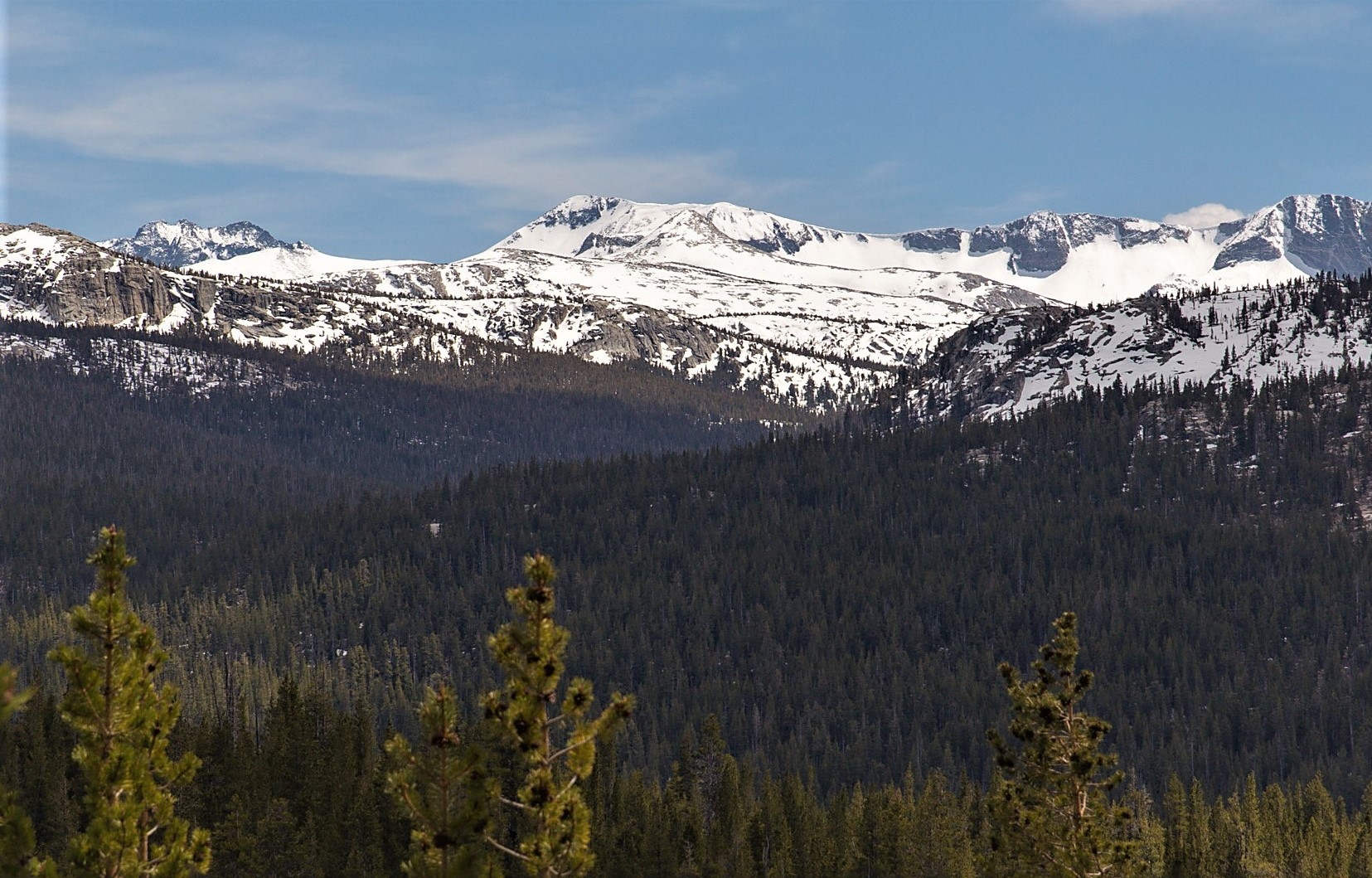
- North aspect centered, from Tioga Road

Highest point
- Elevation: 12,153 ft (3,704 m) NAVD 88
- Prominence: 624 ft (190 m)
- Parent peak: Simmons Peak
- Listing: California county high points 8th
- Coordinates: 37°46′37″N 119°18′28″W

Geography
- Location within California
- Location: Madera and Tuolumne counties, California, U.S.
- Parent range: Cathedral Range; Sierra Nevada
- Topo map: USGS Vogelsang Peak

Climbing
- First ascent: Marion Randall Parsons, prior to 1931
- Easiest route: Easy scramble, class 2

Parsons Peak is a mountain in Yosemite National Park and the Cathedral Range of California's Sierra Nevada. The peak, located on the Madera–Tuolumne county line, rises to an elevation of 12,153 feet (3,704 m). The mountain has a ridge extending northwest from the summit. On this ridge is a point, referred to as Parsons Peak-Northwest Ridge, which rises to an elevation of about 8,848 feet (2,697 m) and at this point the boundaries of Mariposa, Tuolumne, and Madera counties meet. This point is the highest point in Mariposa County.

Most of the precipitation that falls on the mountain is snow due to the very high elevation.

The peak was named for Edward Taylor Parsons, who for many years was a director of the Sierra Club.

== See also ==
- List of highest points in California by county
- Simmons Peak
