= Floy Joy =

Floy Joy may refer to:

- Floy Joy (band), a 1980s Synthpop band
- "Floy Joy" (song), a 1971 song by The Supremes
- Floy Joy (album), a 1972 album by The Supremes
