= Delbert Floy =

American politician (1927–2005)

Member of the Iowa Senate from the 42nd district
- In office January 9, 1967 – January 12, 1969
- Preceded by: Vernon Kyhl
- Succeeded by: Leigh Curran

Member of the Iowa Senate from the 46th district
- In office January 11, 1965 – January 9, 1967
- Preceded by: J. Henry Lucken
- Succeeded by: Merle Hagedorn

Personal details
- Born: February 28, 1927 Thornton, Iowa, U.S.
- Died: September 27, 2005 (aged 78) Mason City, Iowa, U.S.
- Party: Democratic

Delbert Floy (February 28, 1927 – September 27, 2005) was an American politician who served in the Iowa Senate from 1965 to 1969 as a member of the Democratic Party, representing Iowa's 46th Senate district from 1965 to 1967 and Iowa's 42nd Senate district from 1967 to 1969.

He died on September 27, 2005, in Mason City, Iowa, at age 78.
