= Floy Campbell =

American painter (1873–1945)

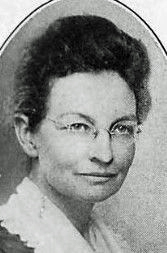
- Born: August 31, 1873; Weston, Missouri
- Died: August 27, 1945 (aged 71); Boulder, Colorado
- Education: Art Students League of New York; Académie Colarossi; Kansas City Art Association and School of Design

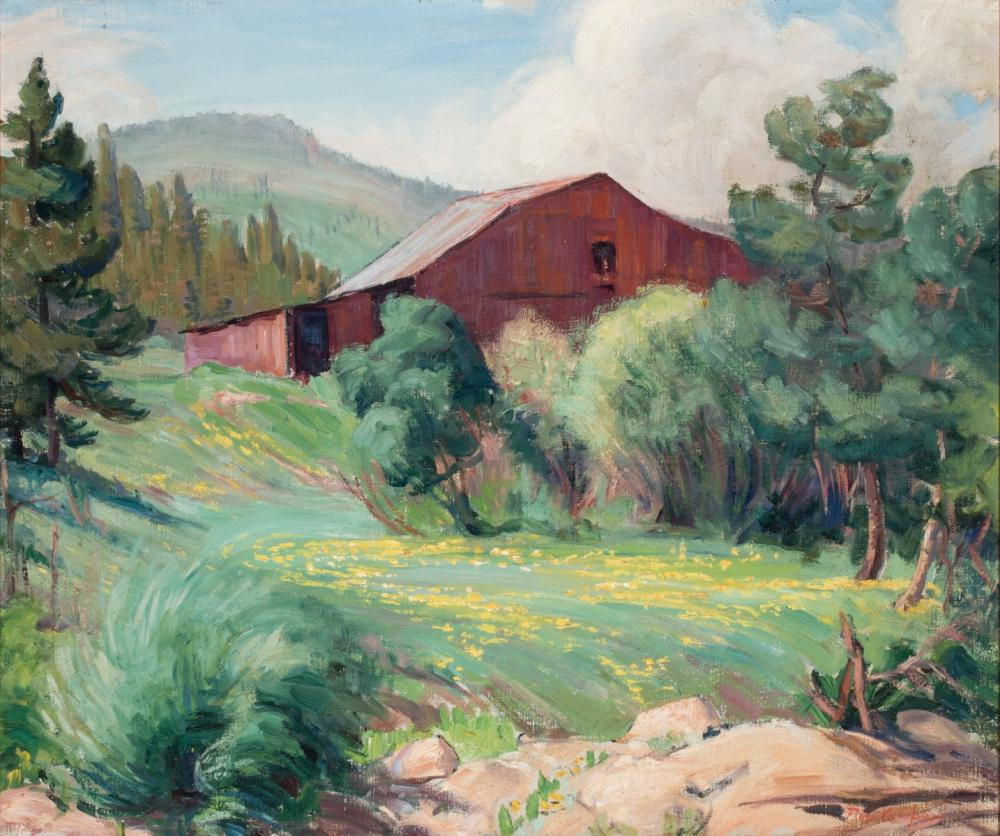

Floy Campbell (August 31, 1873_{,} Weston, Missouri – August 27, 1945, Boulder, Colorado) was an American painter known for her landscape, still life, and portrait paintings. Campbell’s style was greatly influenced by French Impressionism and European Expressionism.

== Life ==
Floy Campbell was born in Weston, Missouri. A graduate of Central High School in Kansas City, MO, Campbell continued her education at Columbia University, the Kansas City Art Association and School of Design (today the Kansas City Art Institute), Art Students League of New York, and the Académie Colarossi in Paris, France.

Campbell moved back to Kansas City in 1896, where she opened her own artist studio in the newly-built Lyceum Building and was hired as an art instructor at the Manual Training High School. At Manual Training High School Campbell taught free hand drawing. Campbell was a member of the Kansas City Paint Club, the Kansas City Society of Artists, the Kansas City Art Club, Society of Women Artists in Paris, and the Boulder Artists Guild.

In 1913, Campbell moved to Puerto Rico to teach art at the University of Puerto Rico. When she returned to Kansas City in 1920, Campbell remained active in the local arts community and continued to teach as head of the art departement at The Kansas City Junior College. She published magazine articles and a novel, and was a strong advocate for the arts and the importance of financial support for artists. Upon her death, she bequeathed her estate to The Kansas City Art Institute.

Campbell died in 1945 in Boulder, Colorado. She is buried at the Green Mountain Cemetery in Boulder.
