= Yosemite Valley Chapel =

Chapel in California, United States

- U.S. National Register of Historic Places
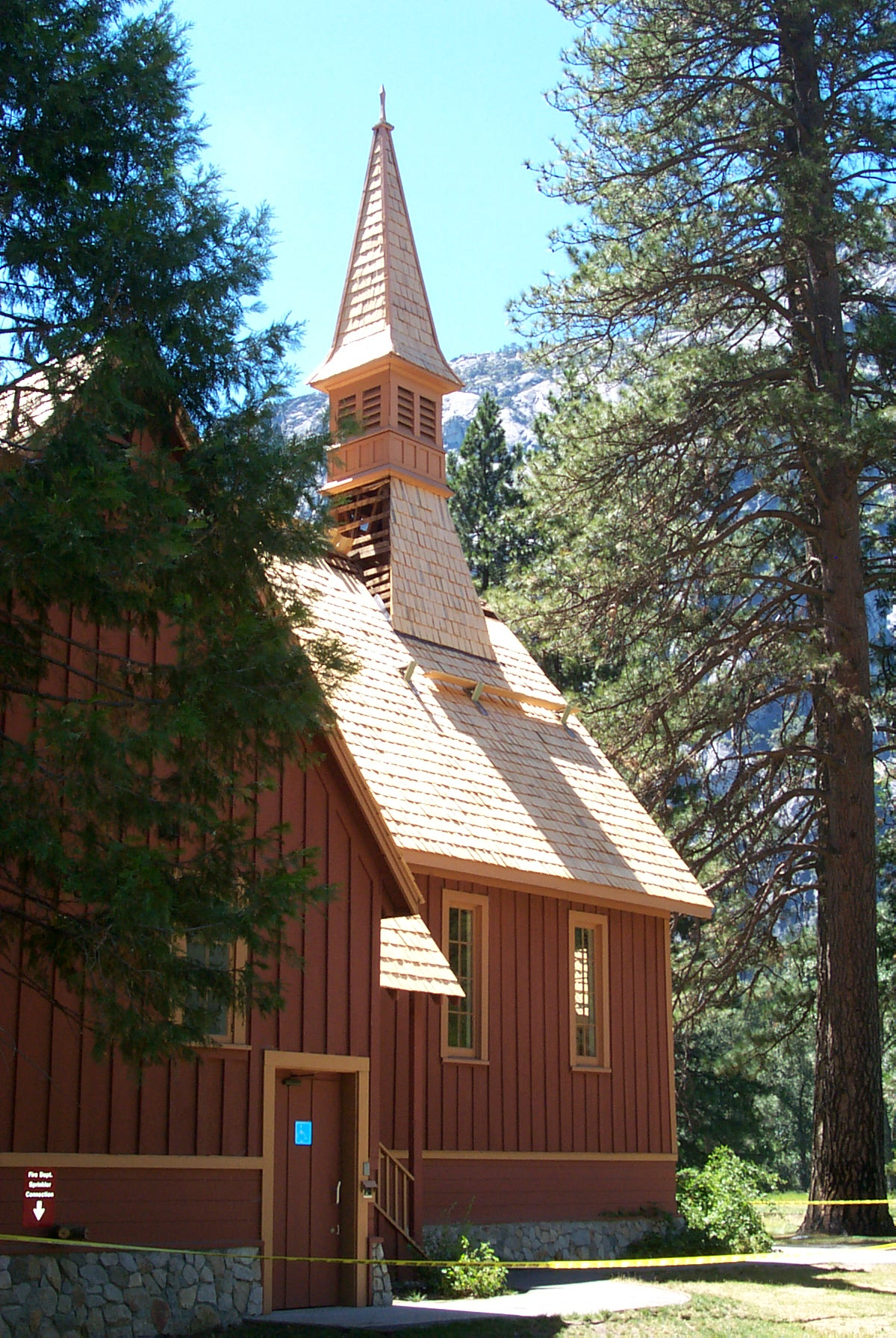

- Location within California Location within the United States
- Location: Yosemite Valley, off CA 140, Yosemite National Park, California
- Coordinates: 37°44′27″N 119°35′26″W
- Area: 1 acre (0.40 ha)
- Built: 1879
- Architectural style: Carpenter Gothic
- NRHP reference No.: 73000256
- Added to NRHP: December 12, 1973

The Yosemite Valley Chapel was built in the Yosemite Valley of California in 1879.

== History ==
The wooden chapel was designed by San Francisco architect Charles Geddes in the Carpenter Gothic style. It was built by Geddes' son-in-law, Samuel Thompson of San Francisco, for the California State Sunday School Association, at a cost of between three or four thousand dollars.

The chapel was originally built in the "Lower Village" as called then, its site at the present day trailhead of the Four Mile Trail. The chapel was moved to its present location in 1901, as the old Lower Village dwindled.

== Description ==
As stipulated in the organization's application for permission, the chapel is an interdenominational facility. The L-shaped frame chapel covers an area of about 1,470 square feet (137 m^{2}). It is clad in board and batten siding with a prominent steeple. It seats about 250 people.

Preservation

The chapel was restored in 1965, when its foundations were raised in response to a 1964 flood, but was damaged in the 1997 Yosemite Valley floods and required repair. The chapel was placed on the National Register of Historic Places on December 12, 1973.
