= James Mason Hutchings =

- Portrait by Bradley & Rulofson, 1875
- Born: February 10, 1820; Towcester, Northamptonshire, England
- Died: October 31, 1902 (aged 82); Yosemite, California, USA
- Resting place: Yosemite Cemetery
- Children: Florence Hutchings; Gertrude Hutchings Mills; William Mason Hutchings

James Mason Hutchings (February 10, 1820 – October 31, 1902) was an American businessman and one of the principal promoters of what is now Yosemite National Park.

== Biography ==
Born in Towcester in England, Hutchings immigrated to the U.S. in 1848, then went to California in 1849 during the Gold Rush. He became wealthy as a miner, lost it all in a bank failure, then became wealthy again from publishing.

In 1853, he published The Miner's Ten Commandments.

On July 5, 1855 James Hutchings set out on what would be one of the most historic trips to the region, leading the second tourist party into Yosemite. (The first tourist party, in 1854, was led by Robert Bruce Lamon, but no account of the trip is known to be written.) He then became one of the first settlers in Yosemite Valley. Hutchings published an illustrated magazine, Hutchings' Illustrated California Magazine that told the world about Yosemite and the Sierra. It was said "...upon the return of Hutchings' party, the descriptions staggered the skeptics and silenced the croakers. From this time forward can be considered the commencement of the visits of tourists." He was a tireless promoter, of himself and Yosemite. After Yosemite Valley was granted to California as protected land in 1864, Hutchings, through his interpretation of existing preemption laws, believed he was entitled to 160 acres (647,000 m²) of land in the Valley. He sued, unsuccessfully, to have those acres deeded to himself; the U.S. Supreme Court ruled Congress could establish the Yosemite Grant. He did, however, get a generous payment from the state to help compensate for loss of land use. In 1875, he was banished from Yosemite Valley because of his constant challenging of the law prohibiting the construction of buildings on public lands.

Hutchings remarried twice and was an innkeeper for the Calaveras Big Tree Grove Hotel, north of Yosemite. Hutchings' prominence in Yosemite Valley allowed him to connect with figures of great importance to the history of Yosemite, including John Muir, Galen Clark and James McCauley.

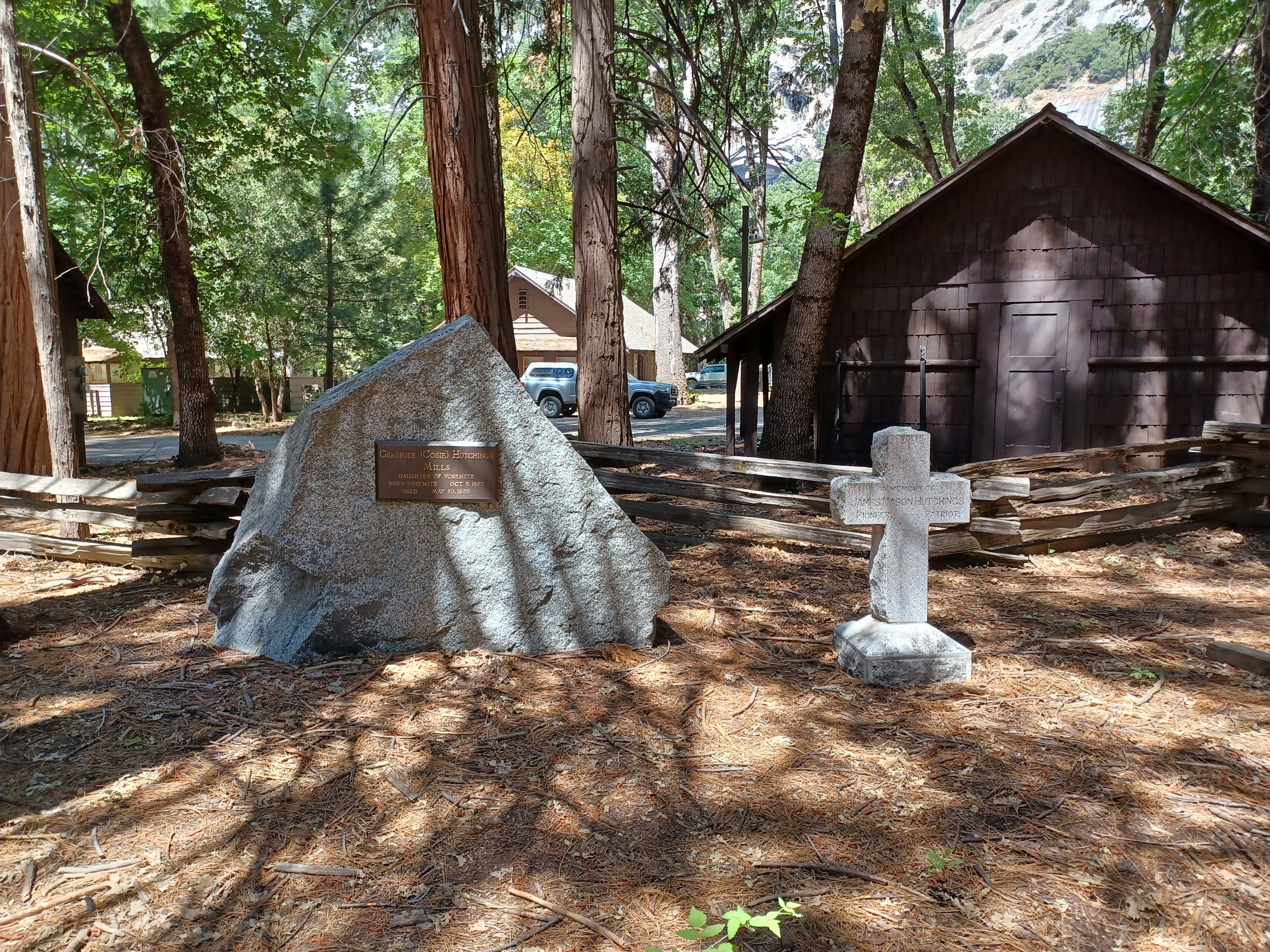
Graves of James Mason Hutchings (right) and Gertrude Hutchings Mills (left) at Yosemite Cemetery

While visiting Yosemite, Hutchings was killed on October 31, 1902, when his horse reared and threw him from his buggy. He is buried at Yosemite Cemetery.
