= National Register of Historic Places listings in Yosemite National Park =

This is a list of the National Register of Historic Places listings in Yosemite National Park.

This is intended to be a complete list of the properties and districts on the National Register of Historic Places in Yosemite National Park, California, United States. The locations of National Register properties and districts for which the latitude and longitude coordinates are included below, may be seen in a Google map.

There are 46 properties and districts listed on the National Register in the park and five National Historic Landmarks. Four more properties associated with the park are located just outside the park boundaries.

This National Park Service list is complete through NPS recent listings posted June 20, 2025.

== Current listings ==
	Name on the Register	Image	Date listed	Location	City or town	Description
1	Acting Superintendent's Headquarters	Acting Superintendent's Headquarters	June 9, 1978 (#78000362)	Pioneer Yosemite History Center; 37°32′20″N 119°39′17″W	Wawona	
2	Ahwahnee Hotel	Ahwahnee Hotel	February 15, 1977 (#77000149)	1 Ahwahnee Drive, Yosemite Valley; 37°44′45″N 119°34′22″W	Yosemite National Park	
3	Buck Camp Patrol Cabin	Buck Camp Patrol Cabin	July 18, 2014 (#14000406)	Jct. of Buck Cr. & Buck Camp Tr. 37°33′47″N 119°29′23″W	Yosemite National Park	
4	Camp 4	Camp 4	February 21, 2003 (#03000056)	Northside Dr., Yosemite Valley; 37°44′30″N 119°36′09″W	Yosemite National Park	
5	Camp Curry Historic District	Camp Curry Historic District	November 1, 1979 (#79000315)	Curry Village, Yosemite Valley; 37°44′36″N 119°34′16″W	Yosemite National Park	
6	Crane Flat Fire Lookout	Crane Flat Fire Lookout	April 4, 1996 (#96000354)	North of Big Oak Flat Rd., near Crane Cr., Yosemite National Park; 37°45′34″N 119°49′10″W	Aspen Valley	part of the Historic Park Landscapes in National and State Parks Multiple Property Submission (MPS)
7	Degnan's Restaurant	Degnan's Restaurant	September 5, 2017 (#100001558)	9001 Village Dr., Yosemite Village; 37°44′53″N 119°35′08″W	Yosemite National Park	
8	Frog Creek Cabin	Frog Creek Cabin	July 18, 2014 (#14000414)	South shore of Lake Eleanor, along Frog Creek; 37°58′59″N 119°50′37″W	Yosemite National Park	1936-built cabin, used originally to support trout egg collection
9	Glacier Point Trailside Museum	Glacier Point Trailside Museum	April 4, 1978 (#78000357)	Glacier Point; 37°43′50″N 119°34′23″W	Yosemite National Park	
10	Glen Aulin High Sierra Camp	Glen Aulin High Sierra Camp	July 18, 2014 (#14000415)	At confluence of Tuolumne River and Alkali Creek; 37°54′32″N 119°25′08″W	Yosemite National Park	
11	Great Sierra Mine Historic Site	Great Sierra Mine Historic Site	May 24, 1978 (#78000382)	Southwest of Lee Vining; 37°55′39″N 119°16′05″W	Yosemite National Park	
12	Great Sierra Wagon Road	Great Sierra Wagon Road	August 25, 1978 (#78000373)	Northwest of Yosemite Valley; 37°50′32″N 119°43′20″W	Yosemite National Park	
13	Half Dome Cables and Trail	Half Dome Cables and Trail	August 15, 2012 (#12000494)	P.O. Box 577; 37°44′49″N 119°31′47″W	Yosemite National Park	
14	Hodgdon Homestead Cabin	Hodgdon Homestead Cabin	June 9, 1978 (#78000356)	Pioneer Yosemite History Center; 37°32′20″N 119°39′19″W	Wawona	
15	Chris Jorgensen Studio	Chris Jorgensen Studio	April 13, 1979 (#79000280)	Pioneer Yosemite History Center; 37°32′20″N 119°39′19″W	Wawona	
16	Lake Vernon Snow Survey Shelter		July 18, 2014 (#14000416)	Terminus of Lake Vernon Tr. 38°01′10″N 119°42′55″W	Yosemite National Park	
17	LeConte Memorial Lodge	LeConte Memorial Lodge	March 8, 1977 (#77000148)	Yosemite Valley; 37°44′24″N 119°34′42″W	Yosemite National Park	
18	Mariposa Grove Museum	Mariposa Grove Museum	December 1, 1978 (#78000381)	Southeast of Wawona; 37°30′50″N 119°35′54″W	Yosemite National Park	
19	May Lake High Sierra Camp		July 18, 2014 (#14000417)	Eastern shore of May Lake; 37°50′42″N 119°29′28″W	Yosemite National Park	
20	McCauley Cabin	McCauley Cabin	March 8, 1977 (#77000359)	Tuolumne Meadows; 37°52′40″N 119°22′01″W	Yosemite National Park	
21	McCauley and Meyer Barns	McCauley and Meyer Barns	June 15, 1978 (#78000353)	North of El Portal; 37°42′00″N 119°45′18″W	Yosemite National Park	
22	McGurk Cabin	McGurk Cabin	June 4, 1979 (#79000281)	South of Yosemite Valley; 37°40′40″N 119°37′27″W	Yosemite National Park	
23	Merced Grove Ranger Station	Merced Grove Ranger Station	June 15, 1978 (#78000358)	North of El Portal; 37°44′56″N 119°50′21″W	Yosemite National Park	
24	Merced Lake High Sierra Camp		July 18, 2014 (#14000407)	Along north bank of Merced River, directly east of Merced Lake; 37°44′24″N 119°24′24″W	Yosemite National Park	
25	Merced Lake Ranger Station		July 18, 2014 (#14000408)	Jct. of Merced Lake Tr. & Lewis Cr. 37°44′18″N 119°23′45″W	Yosemite National Park	
26	Ostrander Lake Ski Hut	Ostrander Lake Ski Hut	July 18, 2014 (#14000409)	Ostrander Lake Tr. 37°37′36″N 119°32′59″W	Yosemite National Park	
27	Parsons Memorial Lodge	Parsons Memorial Lodge	April 30, 1979 (#79000283)	Tuolumne Meadows; 37°52′42″N 119°22′00″W	Yosemite National Park	
28	Rangers' Club	Rangers' Club	May 28, 1987 (#87001414)	Yosemite Village; 37°44′50″N 119°35′12″W	Yosemite National Park	
29	Sachse Spring Snow Survey Shelter		July 18, 2014 (#14000418)	Off Kibbie Ridge Tr. near Sachse Spring; 38°04′51″N 119°50′34″W	Yosemite National Park	
30	Snow Creek Ski Hut		July 18, 2014 (#14000410)	Off Tenaya Lake Trail, westerly shoulder of Mt. Watkins; 37°47′17″N 119°31′22″W	Yosemite National Park	
31	Snow Flat Snow Survey Shelter		July 18, 2014 (#14000411)	Terminus of service road off May Lake Rd. 37°49′31″N 119°29′52″W	Yosemite National Park	
32	Soda Springs Cabin	Soda Springs Cabin	April 19, 1979 (#79000282)	Tuolumne Meadows; 37°52′44″N 119°21′56″W	Yosemite National Park	
33	Sunrise High Sierra Camp		July 18, 2014 (#14000412)	Along north bank of Long Meadow Creek, overlooking Long Meadow (southeast of Sunrise Lakes); 37°47′43″N 119°25′58″W	Yosemite National Park	
34	Tioga Pass Entrance Station	Tioga Pass Entrance Station	December 14, 1978 (#78000372)	Southwest of Lee Vining; 37°54′39″N 119°15′27″W	Yosemite National Park	
35	Tuolumne Meadows		November 30, 1978 (#78000371)	Southwest of Lee Vining; 37°52′17″N 119°22′20″W	Yosemite National Park	Listing is for CCC camp structures in the meadow area
36	Tuolumne Meadows High Sierra Camp	Tuolumne Meadows High Sierra Camp	July 18, 2014 (#14000419)	Along north bank of Dana Fork of Tuolumne River, east of Tuolumne Meadows; 37°52′39″N 119°19′58″W	Yosemite National Park	
37	Tuolumne Meadows Ranger Stations and Comfort Stations	Tuolumne Meadows Ranger Stations and Comfort Stations	December 18, 1978 (#78000370)	Tuolumne Meadows; 37°52′24″N 119°21′16″W	Yosemite National Park	
38	Vogelsang High Sierra Camp	Vogelsang High Sierra Camp	July 18, 2014 (#14000413)	Along Fletcher Creek, immediately southwest of Fletcher Lake; 37°47′43″N 119°20′44″W	Yosemite National Park	
39	Wawona Covered Bridge	Wawona Covered Bridge	January 11, 2007 (#06001261)	Pioneer Yosemite History Center; 37°32′19″N 119°39′17″W	Wawona	
40	Wawona Hotel and Pavilion	Wawona Hotel and Pavilion	October 1, 1975 (#75000223)	On CA 41 in Yosemite National Park; 37°32′11″N 119°39′13″W	Wawona	
41	Yosemite Transportation Company Office	Yosemite Transportation Company Office	June 9, 1978 (#78000355)	Pioneer Yosemite History Center; 37°32′20″N 119°39′17″W	Wawona	
42	Yosemite Valley	Yosemite Valley	December 14, 2006 (#04001159)	Yosemite National Park; 37°43′43″N 119°36′07″W	Yosemite National Park	
43	Yosemite Valley Archeological District		January 20, 1978 (#78000361)	Address Restricted	Yosemite National Park	
44	Yosemite Valley Bridges	Yosemite Valley Bridges	November 25, 1977 (#77000160)	8 bridges over Merced River, Yosemite Valley; 37°43′58″N 119°36′00″W	Yosemite National Park	
45	Yosemite Valley Chapel	Yosemite Valley Chapel	December 12, 1973 (#73000256)	Off CA 140 in Yosemite Valley; 37°44′27″N 119°35′26″W	Yosemite National Park	
46	Yosemite Village Historic District	Yosemite Village Historic District	March 30, 1978 (#78000354)	Yosemite Village; 37°44′55″N 119°35′18″W	Yosemite National Park	

== Associated properties ==
The following properties are on property owned by the National Park Service and administered by Yosemite National Park, but are not within the park proper:

	Name on the Register	Image	Date listed	Location	City or town	Description
1	Bagby Stationhouse, Water Tanks and Turntable	Bagby Stationhouse, Water Tanks and Turntable	April 13, 1979 (#79000316)	CA 140; 37°40′27″N 119°46′47″W	El Portal	
2	Hetch Hetchy Railroad Engine No.6	Hetch Hetchy Railroad Engine No.6	January 30, 1978 (#78000360)	CA 140; 37°40′30″N 119°46′46″W	El Portal	
3	Track Bus No. 19	Track Bus No. 19	May 22, 1978 (#78000363)	CA 140; 37°40′30″N 119°46′46″W	El Portal	
4	Yosemite Valley Railroad Caboose No. 15	Yosemite Valley Railroad Caboose No. 15	May 22, 1978 (#78000352)	CA 140; 37°40′30″N 119°46′46″W	El Portal	

== See also ==
- National Register of Historic Places listings in Mariposa County, California
- National Register of Historic Places listings in Tuolumne County, California
- National Register of Historic Places listings in California
