= National Register of Historic Places listings in Mariposa County, California =

Location of Mariposa County in California

This is a list of the National Register of Historic Places listings in Mariposa County, California.

This is intended to be a complete list of the properties and districts on the National Register of Historic Places in Mariposa County, California, United States. Latitude and longitude coordinates are provided for many National Register properties and districts; these locations may be seen together in a Google map.

There are 45 properties and districts listed on the National Register in the county, including 4 National Historic Landmarks.

This National Park Service list is complete through NPS recent listings posted September 4, 2026.

== Current listings ==
	Name on the Register	Image	Date listed	Location	City or town	Description
1	Acting Superintendent's Headquarters	Acting Superintendent's Headquarters	June 9, 1978 (#78000362)	Pioneer Yosemite History Center; 37°32′20″N 119°39′17″W	Wawona	
2	Ahwahnee Hotel	Ahwahnee Hotel	February 15, 1977 (#77000149)	1 Ahwahnee Drive, Yosemite Valley; 37°44′45″N 119°34′22″W	Yosemite National Park	
3	Bagby Stationhouse, Water Tanks and Turntable	Bagby Stationhouse, Water Tanks and Turntable	April 13, 1979 (#79000316)	CA 140; 37°40′27″N 119°46′47″W	El Portal	
4	Big Gap Flume		May 12, 1975 (#75000438)	East of Groveland, off CA 120 in Stanislaus National Forest; 37°49′19″N 120°03′34″W	Groveland	
5	Bower Cave		June 16, 2003 (#01000719)	Address Restricted	Greeley Hill	
6	Camp 4	Camp 4	February 21, 2003 (#03000056)	Northside Dr., Yosemite Valley; 37°44′30″N 119°36′09″W	Yosemite National Park	
7	Camp Curry Historic District	Camp Curry Historic District	November 1, 1979 (#79000315)	Curry Village, Yosemite Valley; 37°44′36″N 119°34′16″W	Yosemite National Park	
8	Coulterville Main Street Historic District	Coulterville Main Street Historic District	March 12, 1982 (#82002205)	Main St. 37°42′38″N 120°11′50″W	Coulterville	
9	Crane Flat Fire Lookout	Crane Flat Fire Lookout	April 4, 1996 (#96000354)	North of Big Oak Flat Rd., near Crane Cr., Yosemite National Park; 37°45′34″N 119°49′10″W	Aspen Valley	part of the Historic Park Landscapes in National and State Parks Multiple Property Submission (MPS)
10	Degnan's Restaurant	Degnan's Restaurant	September 5, 2017 (#100001558)	9001 Village Dr., Yosemite Village; 37°44′53″N 119°35′08″W	Yosemite National Park	
11	El Portal Archeological District		August 18, 1978 (#78000359)	Address Restricted	Mariposa	
12	El Portal Old Schoolhouse	El Portal Old Schoolhouse	February 1, 2011 (#10001190)	Chapel Lane; 37°40′29″N 119°47′11″W	El Portal	
13	Glacier Point Trailside Museum	Glacier Point Trailside Museum	April 4, 1978 (#78000357)	Glacier Point; 37°43′50″N 119°34′23″W	Yosemite National Park	
14	Half Dome Cables and Trail	Half Dome Cables and Trail	August 15, 2012 (#12000494)	P.O. Box 577; 37°44′49″N 119°31′47″W	Yosemite National Park	
15	Hetch Hetchy Railroad Engine No. 6	Hetch Hetchy Railroad Engine No. 6	January 30, 1978 (#78000360)	CA 140; 37°40′30″N 119°46′46″W	El Portal	
16	Hodgdon Homestead Cabin	Hodgdon Homestead Cabin	June 9, 1978 (#78000356)	Pioneer Yosemite History Center; 37°32′20″N 119°39′19″W	Wawona	
17	Hornitos Masonic Hall No. 98	Hornitos Masonic Hall No. 98	August 3, 2005 (#05000775)	2877 Bear Valley Rd. 37°30′05″N 120°14′14″W	Hornitos	
18	Chris Jorgensen Studio	Chris Jorgensen Studio	April 13, 1979 (#79000280)	Pioneer Yosemite History Center; 37°32′20″N 119°39′19″W	Wawona	
19	LeConte Memorial Lodge	LeConte Memorial Lodge	March 8, 1977 (#77000148)	Curry Village, Yosemite Valley; 37°44′24″N 119°34′42″W	Yosemite National Park	
20	Mariposa County Courthouse	Mariposa County Courthouse	December 7, 1977 (#77000306)	5088 Bullion St. 37°29′20″N 119°57′59″W	Mariposa	
21	Mariposa County High School Auditorium	Mariposa County High School Auditorium	May 2, 1991 (#91000547)	5074 Old Highway N. 37°29′21″N 119°57′47″W	Mariposa	
22	Mariposa Grove Museum	Mariposa Grove Museum	December 1, 1978 (#78000381)	Southeast of Wawona; 37°30′50″N 119°35′54″W	Yosemite National Park	
23	Mariposa Town Historic District	Mariposa Town Historic District	May 15, 1991 (#91000560)	Roughly bounded by Charles, 11th, Jones and 4th sts. 37°29′14″N 119°57′54″W	Mariposa	
24	McCauley and Meyer Barns	McCauley and Meyer Barns	June 15, 1978 (#78000353)	North of El Portal; 37°42′00″N 119°45′18″W	Yosemite National Park	
25	McGurk Cabin	McGurk Cabin	June 4, 1979 (#79000281)	South of Yosemite Valley; 37°40′40″N 119°37′27″W	Yosemite National Park	
26	Merced Grove Ranger Station	Merced Grove Ranger Station	June 15, 1978 (#78000358)	North of El Portal; 37°44′56″N 119°50′21″W	Yosemite National Park	
27	Merced Lake High Sierra Camp		July 18, 2014 (#14000407)	Along north bank of Merced River, directly east of Merced Lake; 37°44′24″N 119°24′24″W	Yosemite National Park	
28	Merced Lake Ranger Station		July 18, 2014 (#14000408)	Jct. of Merced Lake Tr. & Lewis Cr. 37°44′18″N 119°23′45″W	Yosemite National Park	
29	Ostrander Lake Ski Hut	Ostrander Lake Ski Hut	July 18, 2014 (#14000409)	Ostrander Lake Tr. 37°37′36″N 119°32′59″W	Yosemite National Park	
30	Rangers' Club	Rangers' Club	May 28, 1987 (#87001414)	Yosemite Village; 37°44′50″N 119°35′12″W	Yosemite National Park	
31	St. Joseph Catholic Church, Rectory and Cemetery	St. Joseph Catholic Church, Rectory and Cemetery	April 16, 1991 (#91000424)	4983-4985 Bullion St. 37°28′57″N 119°57′37″W	Mariposa	
32	Snow Creek Ski Hut		July 18, 2014 (#14000410)	Off Tenaya Lake Trail, westerly shoulder of Mt. Watkins; 37°47′17″N 119°31′22″W	Yosemite National Park	
33	Snow Flat Snow Survey Shelter		July 18, 2014 (#14000411)	Terminus of service road off May Lake Rd. 37°49′31″N 119°29′52″W	Yosemite National Park	
34	Sunrise High Sierra Camp		July 18, 2014 (#14000412)	Along north bank of Long Meadow Creek, overlooking Long Meadow (southeast of Sunrise Lakes); 37°47′43″N 119°25′58″W	Yosemite National Park	
35	Track Bus No. 19	Track Bus No. 19	May 22, 1978 (#78000363)	CA 140; 37°40′30″N 119°46′46″W	El Portal	
36	Vogelsang High Sierra Camp	Vogelsang High Sierra Camp	July 18, 2014 (#14000413)	Along Fletcher Creek, immediately southwest of Fletcher Lake; 37°47′43″N 119°20′44″W	Yosemite National Park	
37	Wawona Covered Bridge	Wawona Covered Bridge	January 11, 2007 (#06001261)	Pioneer Yosemite History Center; 37°32′19″N 119°39′17″W	Wawona	
38	Wawona Hotel and Pavilion	Wawona Hotel and Pavilion	October 1, 1975 (#75000223)	On CA 41 in Yosemite National Park; 37°32′11″N 119°39′13″W	Wawona	
39	Yosemite Transportation Company Office	Yosemite Transportation Company Office	June 9, 1978 (#78000355)	Pioneer Yosemite History Center; 37°32′20″N 119°39′17″W	Wawona	
40	Yosemite Valley	Yosemite Valley	December 14, 2006 (#04001159)	Yosemite National Park; 37°43′43″N 119°36′07″W	Yosemite National Park	
41	Yosemite Valley Archeological District		January 20, 1978 (#78000361)	Address Restricted	Yosemite National Park	
42	Yosemite Valley Bridges	Yosemite Valley Bridges	November 25, 1977 (#77000160)	8 bridges over Merced River, in Yosemite Valley; 37°43′57″N 119°33′31″W	Yosemite National Park	
43	Yosemite Valley Chapel	Yosemite Valley Chapel	December 12, 1973 (#73000256)	Off CA 140 in Yosemite Valley; 37°44′28″N 119°35′30″W	Yosemite National Park	
44	Yosemite Valley Railroad Caboose No. 15	Yosemite Valley Railroad Caboose No. 15	May 22, 1978 (#78000352)	CA 140; 37°40′30″N 119°46′46″W	El Portal	
45	Yosemite Village Historic District	Yosemite Village Historic District	March 30, 1978 (#78000354)	Yosemite Village; 37°44′55″N 119°35′18″W	Yosemite National Park	

== Former listing ==
	Name on the Register	Image	Date listed	Date removed	Location	City or town	Description
1	Degnan House and Bakery	Degnan House and Bakery	September 5, 1975 (#75002146)	March 19, 1981	Southside Dr., Yosemite Valley	Yosemite National Park	House was removed, while bakery was relocated to the Pioneer Yosemite History Center.

== See also ==
- List of National Historic Landmarks in California
- National Register of Historic Places listings in California
- California Historical Landmarks in Mariposa County, California
