= Ostrander Lake =

Lake in Mariposa County, California, US

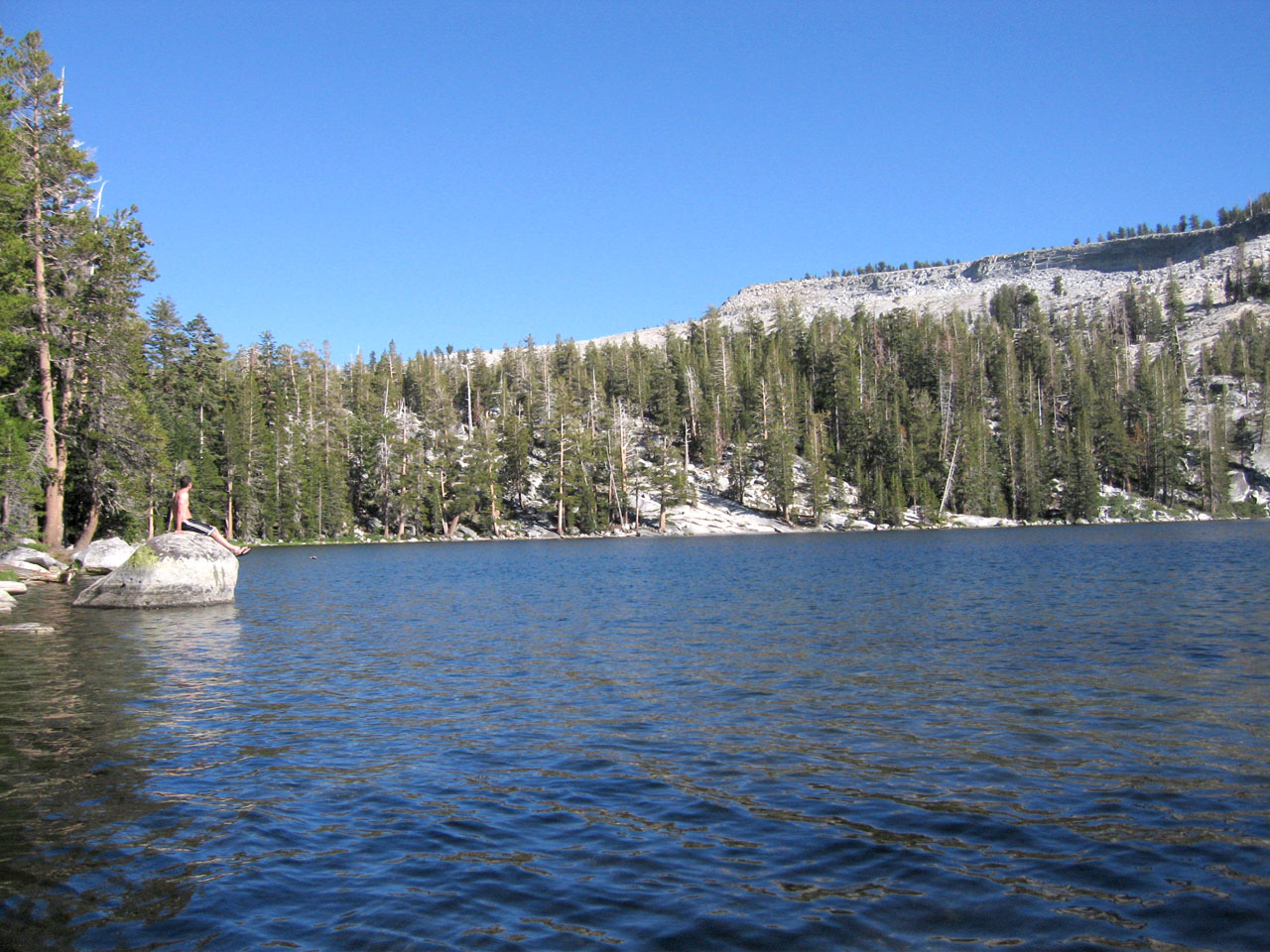
- August 2005

- Location within California Location within the United States
- Location: Yosemite National Park, Mariposa County, California, US
- Coordinates: 37°37′28″N 119°33′02″W
- Primary outflows: Bridalveil Creek
- Basin countries: United States
- Surface elevation: 8,500 ft (2,600 m)

Ostrander Lake is located in Yosemite National Park, approximately 10 miles (16 km) south of Yosemite Valley and 10 miles (16 km) east of the Badger Pass Ski Area, at an elevation of 8,500 feet (2,600 m). The lake is a popular destination for cross-country skiers during the winter. It is the primary source of Bridalveil Creek, which feeds Bridalveil Falls.

== Hiking Trail ==
The hike to Ostrander Lake is a long and strenuous 12.7 miles (20.4 km) out and back hike starting from the trailhead located just after Bridalveil Creek on the Glacier Point road. This hike requires a Backcountry Permit, if staying overnight, which is available at the Wilderness Center in Yosemite Village. The hike begins with a fairly level path through an extensive burned over and regrowth area, with both shaded and sunny areas. The second half of the hike climbs, steep at times, over 1,500 feet (460 m) in elevation in about 3 miles. Portions of the 4th and 5th miles are not shady and can make for warm hiking on summer afternoons. Hikers will have a nice view of Clark Range before dropping down to the north shore of the lake. Several excellent campsites can be found on the west side of the lake, particularly on the benches overlooking the rocky ridge that forms the eastern shore backdrop. Fishing is fair for 10-12" rainbow trout. In the summer, the lake is a great backpacking destination because the ski hut is unoccupied but its presence keeps away the hordes of hikers looking for a "wilderness" destination.

The lake is named for a descendant of Alexander Ostrander (1783) of Smithfield NY. This branch of Ostrander family settled in Colorado (Georgetown, Granby, Hot Sulphur Springs, Golden) prior to 1872, and some moved from Colorado to California.

== The Ostrander Ski Hut ==
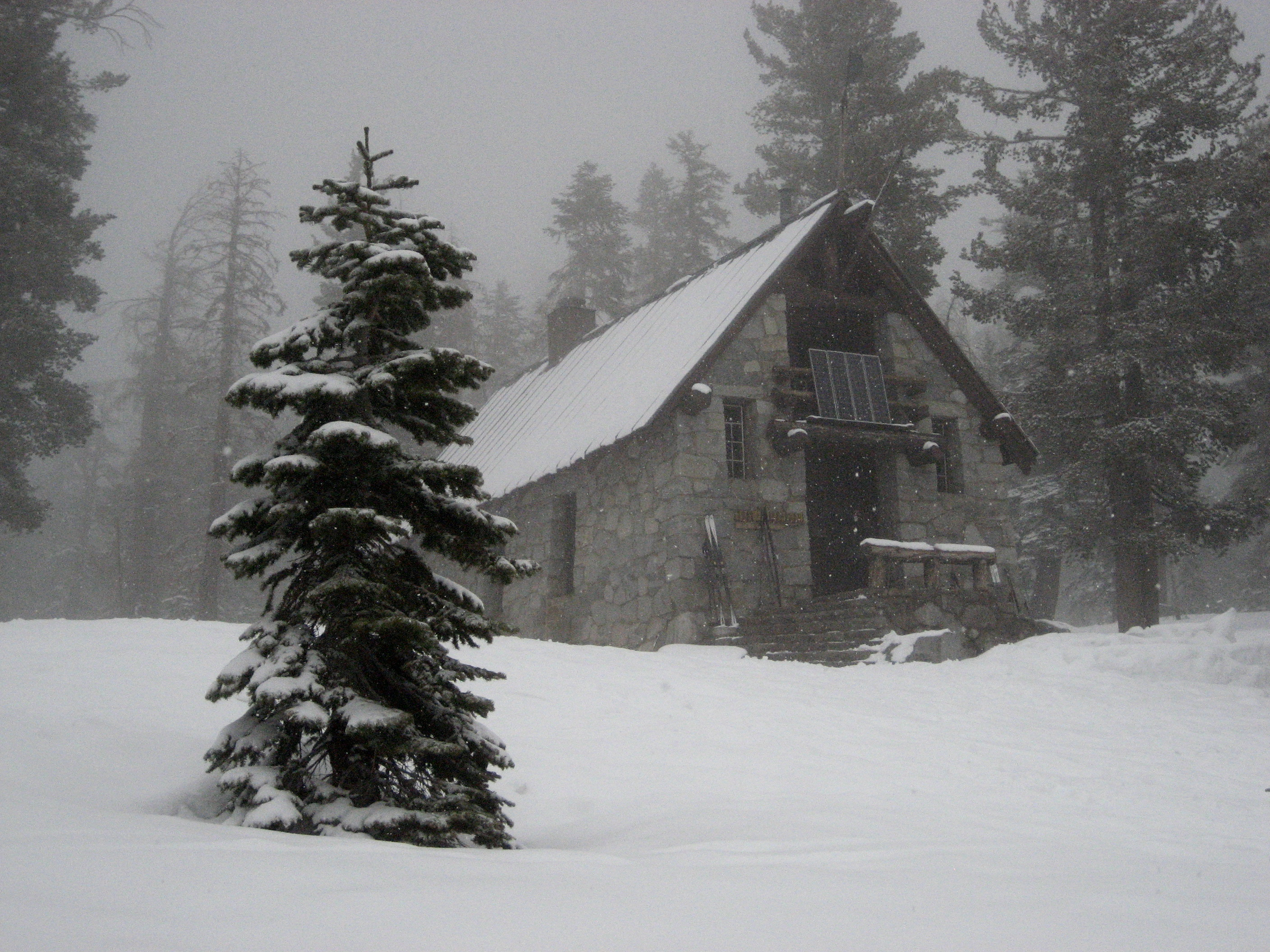
Ostrander Ski Hut, March 2007

The Ostrander Ski Hut is a two-story stone structure built in 1941 by the Civilian Conservation Corps specifically for cross-country skiers. It was intended to be part of a larger system of winter trails and huts along the Sierra Crest that never were developed.

The hut sits in a small glacial cirque at the edge of Ostrander Lake. Very basic overnight accommodations and cooking facilities are available at the hut. It sleeps 25 people and has bunks, mattresses, wood stove, a kitchen with a gas stove for cooking and assorted pots and pans available for the visitor's use. Drinking and wash water is hauled from the lake in buckets; treatment is the individual visitor's responsibility. Light is from solar powered lights.

In winter, when the Glacier Point Road is closed at Badger Pass Ski area, the trail to Ostrander Ski Hut is ten miles one way. The trip is not for novices. The hut is operated by the Yosemite Conservancy, a non-profit educational organization in Yosemite National Park. It is staffed with a hutmaster during the winter months.

== See also ==
- List of lakes in California
