= Charles Sumner (disambiguation) =

Charles Sumner (1811–1874) was an American politician from Massachusetts.

Charles Sumner may also refer to:

- Charles Pinckney Sumner (1776–1839), American attorney, abolitionist, and politician
- Charles Sumner (bishop) (1790–1874), English bishop
- Charles A. Sumner (1835–1903), U.S. representative from California
- Charles Burt Sumner (1837–1927), Congregational minister and founding trustee of Pomona College
- Charles K. Sumner (1874–1948), American architect
- Charles Sumner, birth name of Howard Hall (actor) (1867–1921), American actor and writer
- Charlie Sumner (politician) (1867–1925), British politician and trade unionist
- Charlie Sumner (1930–2015), American football player
