= McGurk Cabin =

Historic house in California, United States

- U.S. National Register of Historic Places
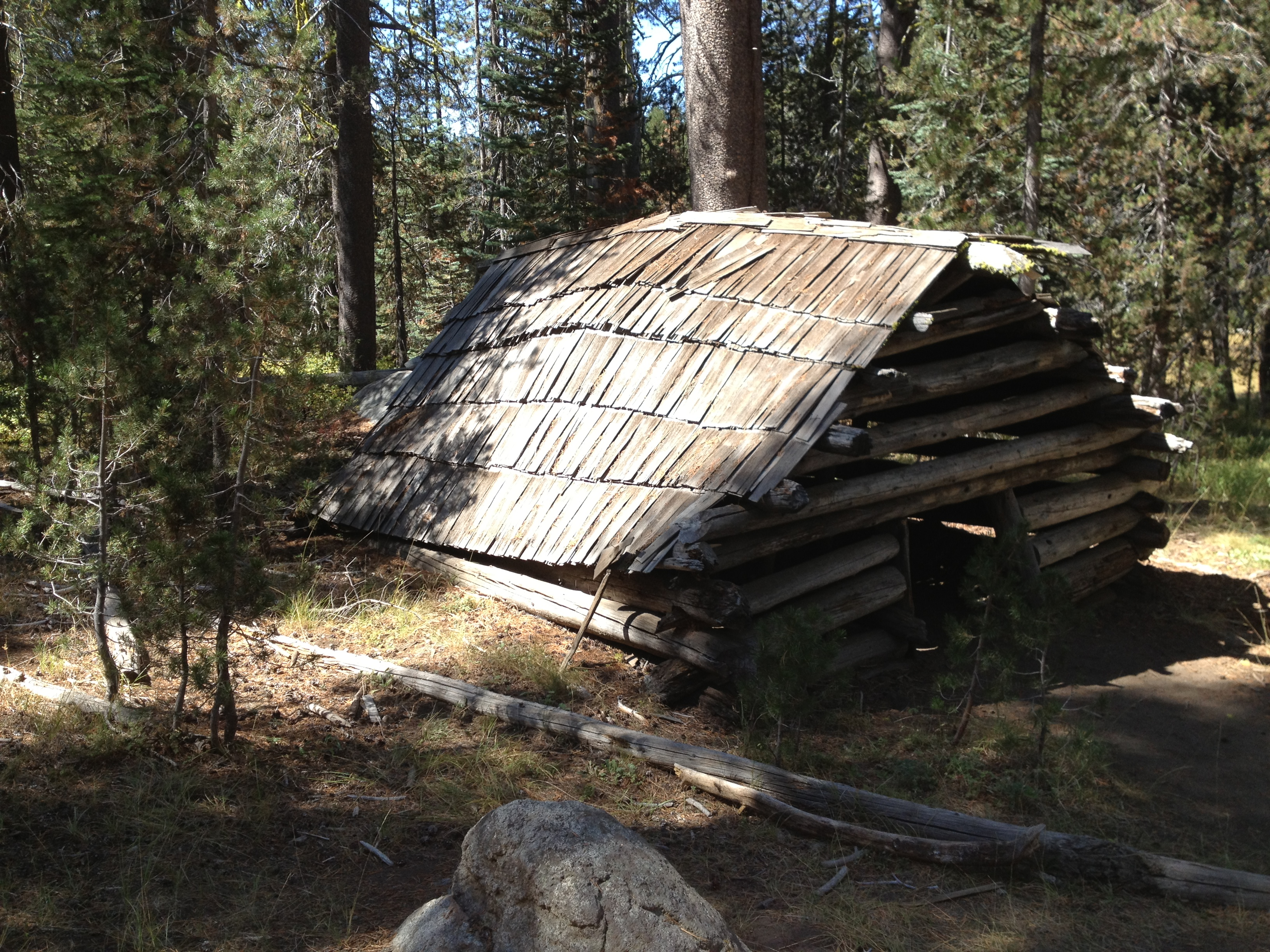

- Location within California Location within the United States
- Nearest city: Yosemite Village, California
- Coordinates: 37°40′40″N 119°37′27″W
- Area: less than one acre
- Built: 1895
- Architect: Davanay, Hugh
- NRHP reference No.: 79000281
- Added to NRHP: June 4, 1979

The McGurk Cabin in Yosemite National Park was the seasonal home of Yosemite cattleman Jack McGurk from 1895 to 1897. Located on the edge of McGurk's Meadow, just to the north of the Glacier Point Road, the cabin was used by a series of owners beginning with Hugh Davanay, from whom McGurk bought the property in 1895. McGurk was evicted by the Army in 1897 after a dispute over title to the land. The log cabin is a one-room structure, about 14 feet (4.3 m) square, with saddle-notched peeled lodgepole pine logs. The only opening is a low door on the south side. The cabin was stabilized in 1958 by Sierra Club volunteers. It is one of the few structures left in the park that remain from the pre-park era.

The cabin was listed on the National Register of Historic Places on June 4, 1979.

== See also ==
- National Register of Historic Places listings in Yosemite National Park
- National Register of Historic Places listings in Mariposa County, California
