= Glacier Point Trailside Museum =

- U.S. National Register of Historic Places
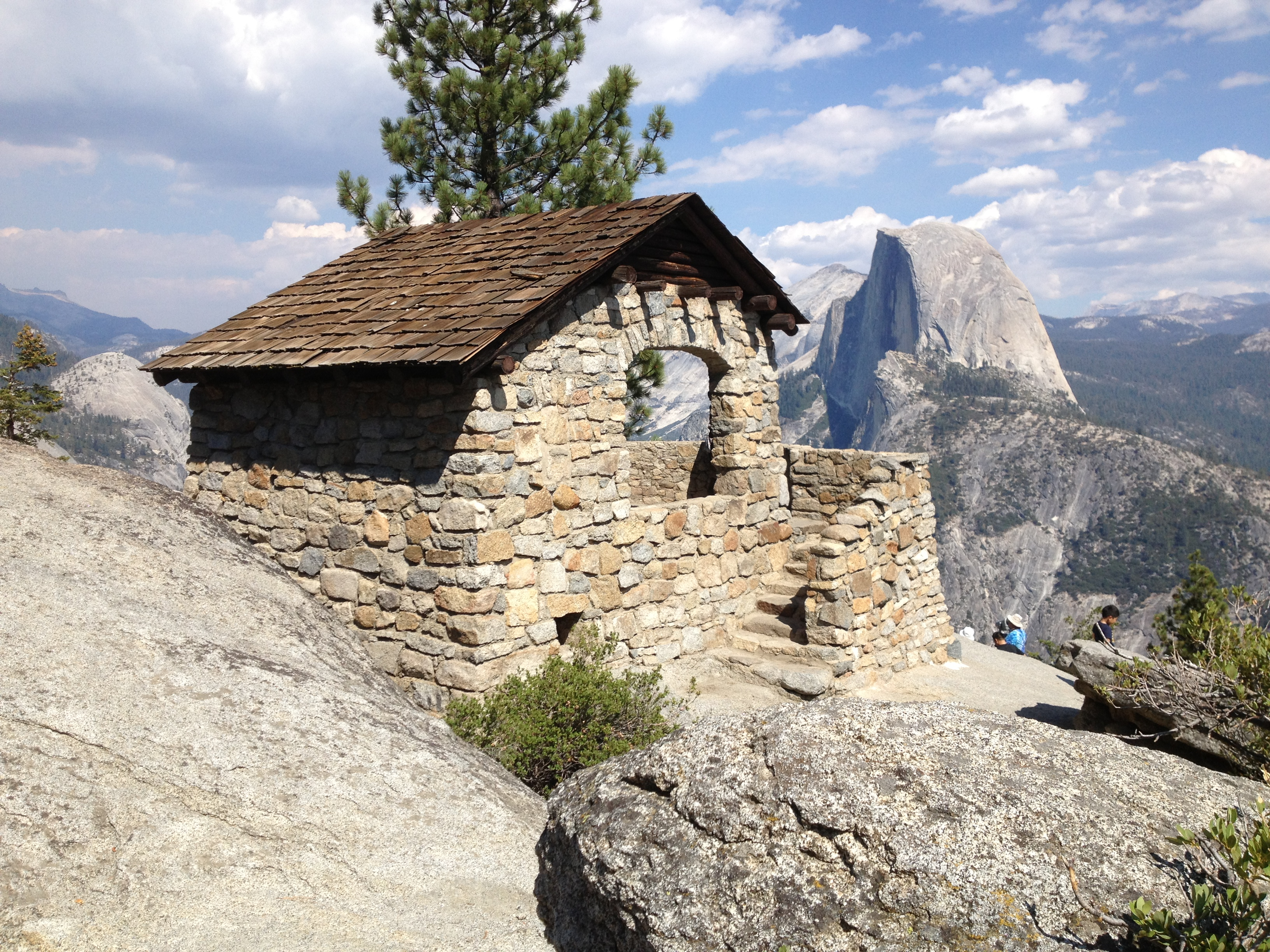

- Location within California Location within the United States
- Nearest city: El Portal, California
- Coordinates: 37°43′50″N 119°34′23″W
- Built: 1924
- Architect: National Park Service
- Architectural style: National Park Service Rustic
- NRHP reference No.: 78000357
- Added to NRHP: April 4, 1978

The Glacier Point Trailside Museum was one of the first projects in Yosemite National Park by Herbert Maier in what would become the National Park Service Rustic style. Located at Glacier Point, it was funded by Laura Spelman Rockefeller's estate as a project for the Yosemite Museum. It was the first "trailside museum" in the National Park system and was a prototype for enhanced visitor interpretation services in the parks.

The museum is in reality a small stone shelter with arched openings on the north, east, and west sides. The roof is supported by log timbers.

== See also ==
- Architects of the National Park Service
- National Register of Historic Places listings in Yosemite National Park
- National Register of Historic Places listings in Mariposa County, California
