= Merced Grove =

Giant sequoia grove in Yosemite National Park, California, United States

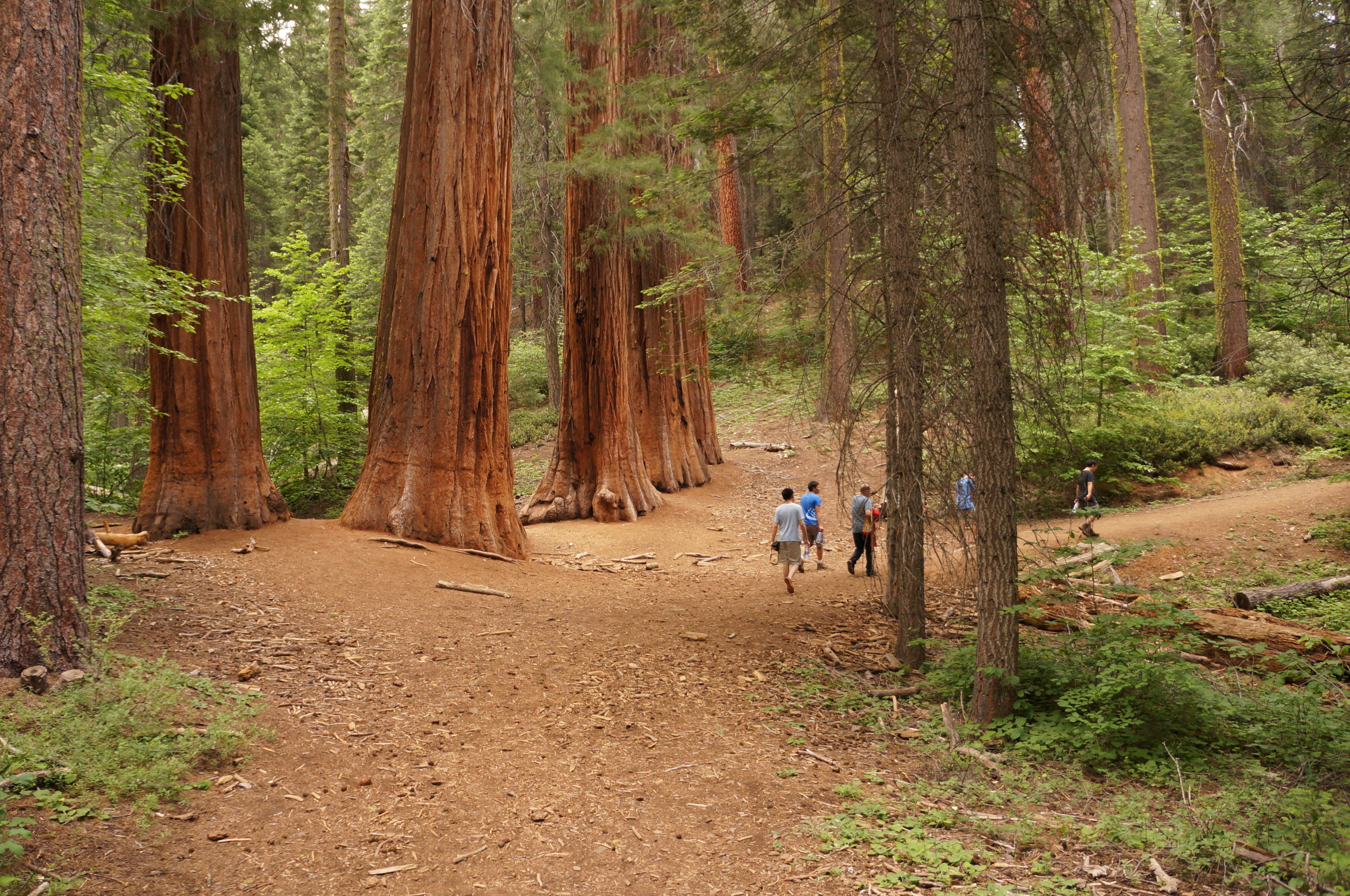
- Merced Grove

- Location within California
- Interactive map of Merced Grove

Geography
- Location: Mariposa County, California, United States
- Coordinates: 37°44′58″N 119°50′14″W
- Elevation: 5,469 feet (1,667 m)

Ecology
- Dominant tree species: Sequoiadendron giganteum

Merced Grove is a giant sequoia grove located about 3.6 km (2.2 mi) west of Crane Flat in the Merced River watershed of Yosemite National Park, California. The grove occupies a small valley at an elevation of 5,469 feet (1,667 m) and is accessible by a 2.5 km (1.6 mi) dirt trail.

The grove hosts about 20 large trees with a relatively open understory, and are spread out over the last 0.4 km (0.25 mi) of the trail.

== History ==
The first road to Merced Grove, a stagecoach route, opened in 1875. This made the grove accessible to visitors from across the country, who could take a train to Merced, then travel by stagecoach through Coulterville and into Yosemite.

Yosemite National Park opened to automobiles in 1913, marking a new era of accessibility for visitors. Foresta, a private summer camp near the park's western entrance, was established near Merced Grove. The grove quickly became a popular stopover for the first automobile travelers heading into the park. Merced Grove was the first Yosemite destination to open to automobiles each spring after the winter months of impassable roads.

== Fire ==
Humans have been protecting Merced Grove from wildfires since 1909, when soldiers and foresters first intervened to extinguish a wildfire threatening the grove. In recent years, firefighters successfully defended the area from several major blazes, including the Motor Fire in 2011, the Rim Fire in 2013, the El Portal Fire in 2014, and the Ferguson Fire in 2018.

== Merced Grove Ranger Station ==
The Merced Grove Ranger Station was designed by the National Park Service and completed in 1935 as a replacement for the 1915 checking station on the Coulterville Road. It was listed on the National Register of Historic Places in 1978.

== See also ==
- List of giant sequoia groves
- Mariposa Grove - a sequoia grove in the southernmost part of Yosemite National Park.
- Tuolumne Grove - a nearby giant sequoia grove
