= Pioneer Yosemite History Center =

Open air museum in California

Coordinates: 37.5387°N 119.6559°W

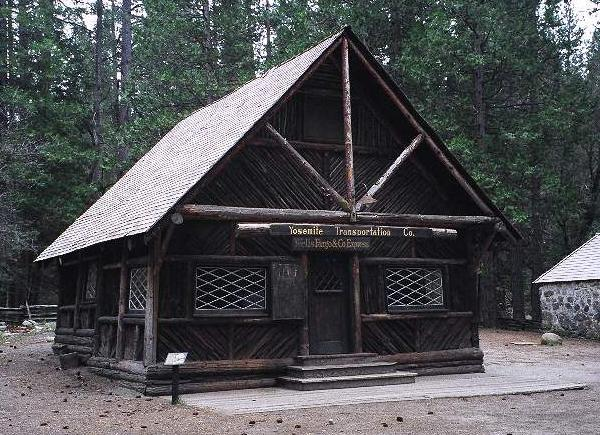
Wells Fargo Office in Pioneer Yosemite History Center

The Pioneer Yosemite History Center is an assembled collection of historic buildings from Yosemite National Park that is located in Wawona, California. Visitors can walk around the buildings year round, and the interiors are open in the summer on a limited basis. There are also special programs and carriage rides in the summer.

The buildings include:

- Acting Superintendent's Headquarters
- Blacksmith shop
- Cavalry office
- Chris Jorgenson Studio
- Degnan's Bakery
- George Anderson Pioneer Home
- Hodgdon Homestead Cabin
- Powderhouse and jail
- Ranger patrol cabin
- Wawona Covered Bridge
- Yosemite Transportation Company Office (a.k.a. Wells Fargo Office)

The Acting Superintendent's Headquarters, the Chris Jorgenson Studio, the Hodgdon Homestead Cabin, the Wawona Covered Bridge, and the Yosemite Transportation Company Office are all listed on the National Register of Historic Places.
