= Tuolumne Meadows Ranger Stations and Comfort Stations =

- U.S. National Register of Historic Places
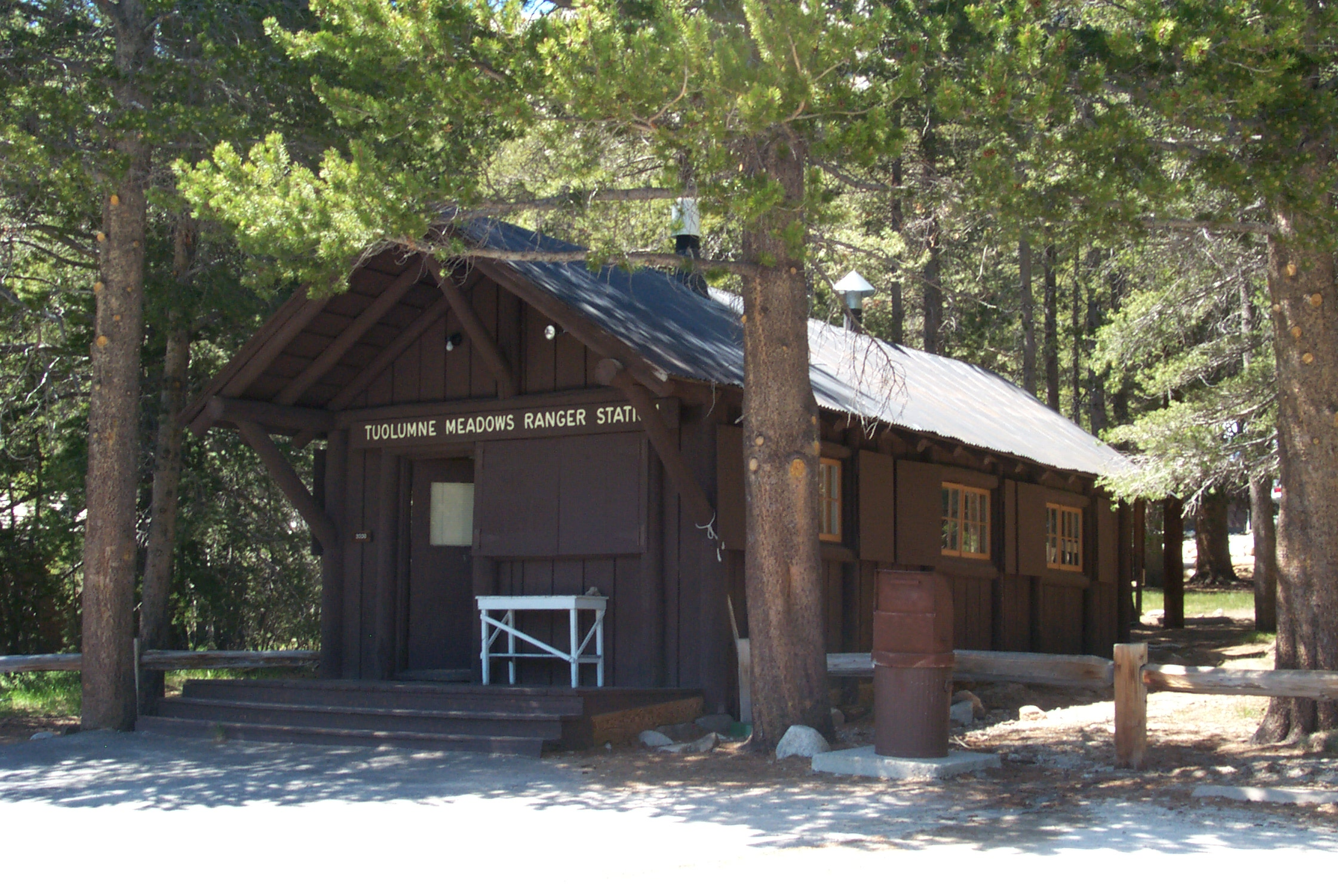
- Tuolumne Meadows Ranger Station, at Tuolumne Meadows

- Location within California Location within the United States
- Nearest city: Lee Vining, California
- Coordinates: 37°52′24″N 119°21′16″W
- Built: 1924
- Architect: National Park Service
- Architectural style: National Park Service Rustic
- NRHP reference No.: 78000370
- Added to NRHP: December 18, 1978

The Tuolumne Meadows Ranger Station and Comfort Stations are examples of National Park Service Rustic design in Yosemite National Park. They are within the Tuolumne Meadows Historic District at Tuolumne Meadows. The ranger station was built in 1924 using peeled log construction. The ranger station doubled as the park entrance station for the Tioga Road. Its function was partly superseded by a newer structure in 1936, using larger quantities of stonework.

== Later structures ==
Later structures, such as the comfort station or public toilet, was designed by the National Park Service Branch of Plans and Designs and was built by Civilian Conservation Corps labor.

Other structures, including bunk houses and mess halls were built in the Tuolumne Meadows Historic District at the same time to similar design standards. The original CCC mess hall, built in 1934, has become the Tuolumne Meadows Visitor Center.

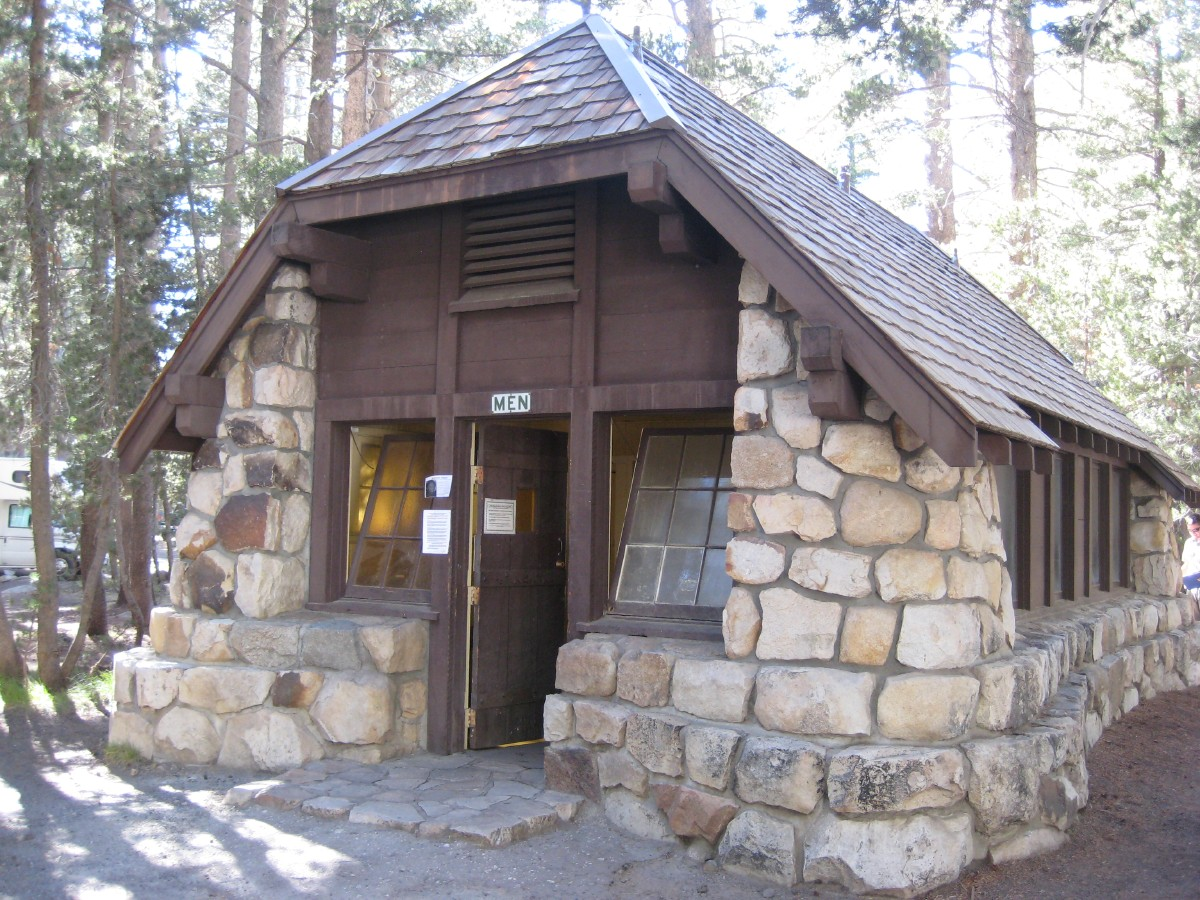
Tuolumne Meadows Comfort Station

== See also ==
- History of the Yosemite area
- National Register of Historic Places listings in Mariposa County, California
- Tuolumne Meadows
