= Hornitos Masonic Hall No. 98 =

- U.S. National Register of Historic Places
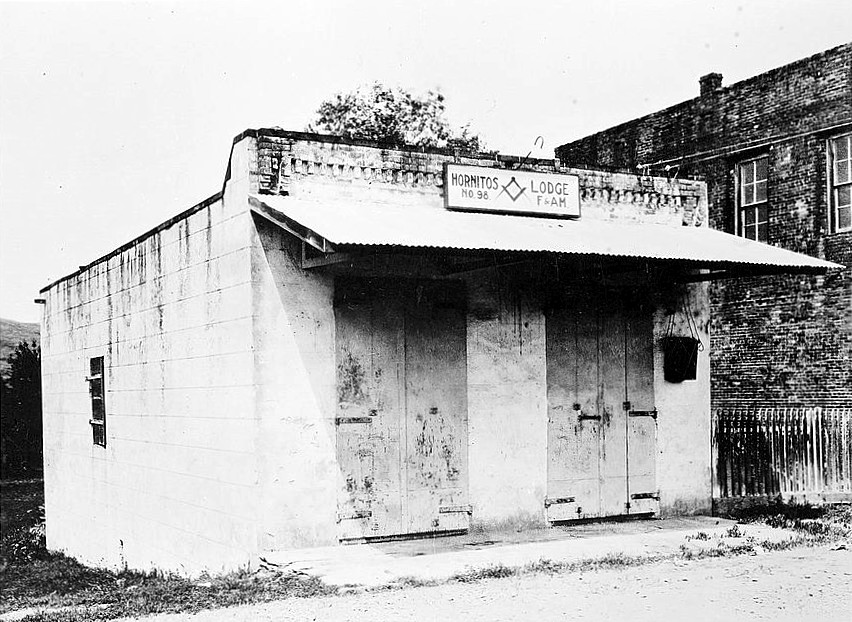
- Hornitos Masonic Hall in 1925.

- Location within California Location within the United States
- Location: 2877 Bear Valley Rd., Hornitos, California
- Coordinates: 37°30′5″N 120°14′14″W
- Area: less than one acre
- Architectural style: Mid 19th Century Revival
- NRHP reference No.: 05000775
- Added to NRHP: August 3, 2005

The Hornitos Masonic Hall No. 98 is a historic Masonic Hall building in Hornitos, Mariposa County, California.

== History ==
It was built in 1855 by Italian stonemasons who worked in the gold mines of the Mother Lode of the California Gold Rush. It is classified as an unreinforced masonry building because its walls have no metal support. All rock, granite, and brick materials came from local sources.

During the first twenty years of its existence, the building served many different purposes, operating as a photography studio, a jewelry and watch store, tailor shop and finally as the Fashion Saloon.

Masonic Hall

It was purchased by Masons in August 1873 for $220, and they renovated it for a Masonic Hall. Sometime in early 1875, the Masonic Hornitos Lodge No. 98 began holding regular meetings in the building and have occupied it ever since.

The building was listed on the National Register of Historic Places in 2005.

== See also ==
- National Register of Historic Places listings in Mariposa County, California
