= Yosemite Transportation Company Office =

- U.S. National Register of Historic Places
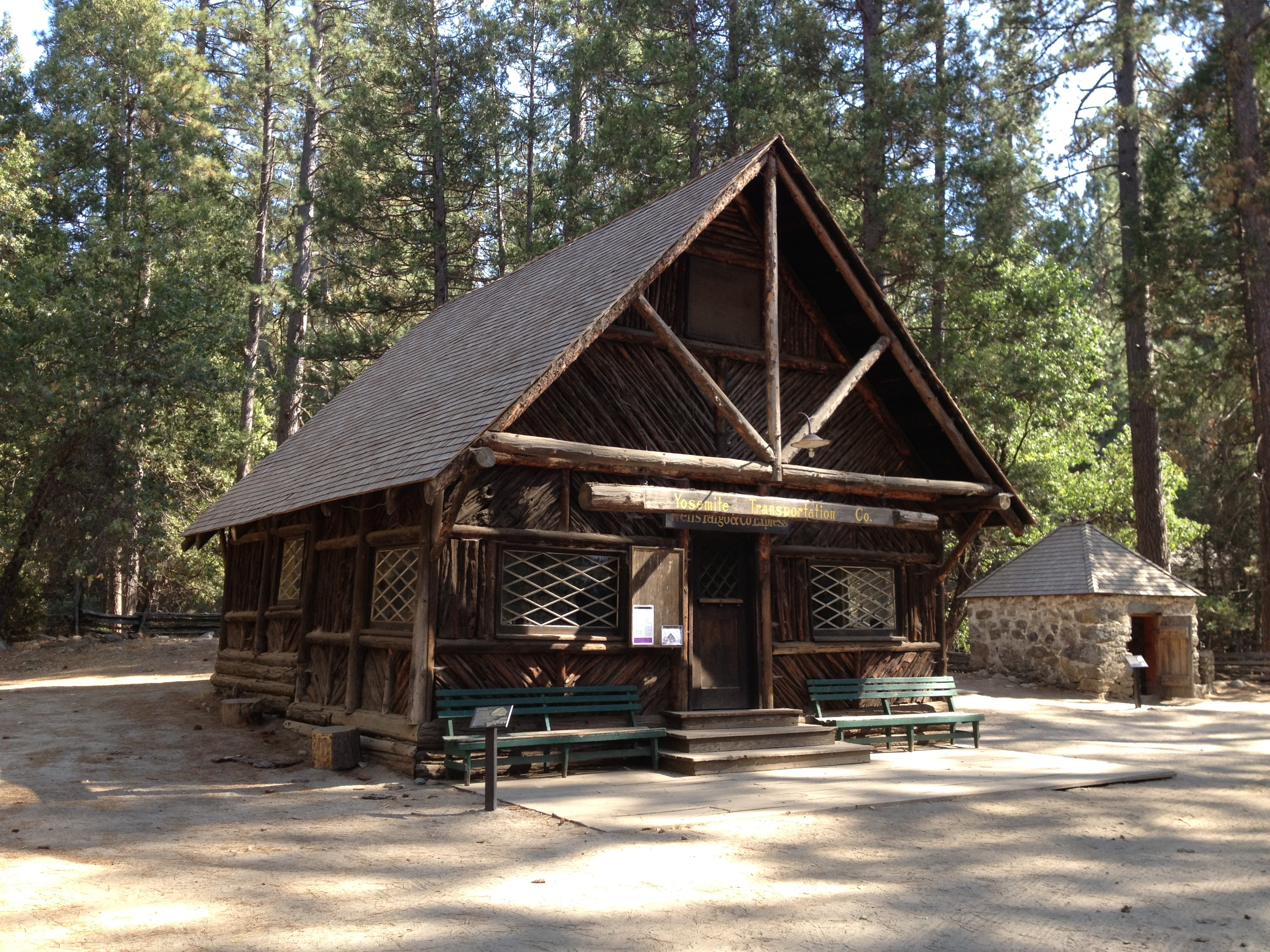

- Location within California Location within the United States
- Nearest city: Wawona, California
- Coordinates: 37°32′20″N 119°39′17″W
- Area: less than one acre
- Built: 1910
- Architect: Yosemite Valley Railroad
- Architectural style: Rustic
- NRHP reference No.: 78000355
- Added to NRHP: June 9, 1978

The Yosemite Transportation Company Office, also known as the Wells Fargo Office, was built in the Yosemite Valley of the U.S. state of California in 1910 to house facilities of motor stage and horse stage services between the nearest rail terminal at El Portal and Yosemite National Park. The rustic log structure also provided telegraph and express services.

== Description ==
The 1-1/2 story log structure measures 23 feet (7.0 m) by 21 feet (6.4 m), with a prominent front porch, accented by a decorative log truss. The building is an example of the Rustic architecture as it was applied at Yosemite, with strips of cedar bark applied in a decorative pattern.

== History ==
After 1927 the importance of stage services declined with the completion of a paved automobile road into the valley, and the YTC Office became a clearinghouse for accommodations in the Yosemite Valley. In the late 1930s the building was converted to a residence.

The National Park Service management plan for the Yosemite Valley planned for the removal of buildings considered intrusive in the Old Yosemite Village area. The YTC building was designated for demolition during the Mission 66 program, but was instead moved to the Pioneer Yosemite History Center at Wawona in Yosemite National Park for preservation, part of an ensemble of other buildings moved from elsewhere in Yosemite.

The Yosemote Transportation Company Office was placed on the National Register of Historic Places on June 9, 1978.

== See also ==
- History of the Yosemite area
- National Register of Historic Places listings in Mariposa County, California
