= Charles K. Sumner =

American architect

- Born: Charles Sumner Kaiser; 1874; Wilkes-Barre, Pennsylvania, United States
- Died: May 25, 1948 (aged 73–74); Palo Alto, California, United States
- Other names: Charles Kaiser Sumner
- Education: Columbia University School of Architecture
- Occupation: architect
- Known for: primarily residential, with occasional commercial or institutional clients
- Notable work: fifty houses in Palo Alto, with twenty houses on the Stanford University campus

Charles Kaiser Sumner (1874–1948) was an American architect, who practiced primarily in California.

== Formative years ==
Born as Charles Sumner Kaiser in Wilkes-Barre, Pennsylvania in 1874, Charles Kaiser attended the Columbia University School of Architecture. He received a traveling scholarship to Europe and the Middle East and was hired by McKim, Mead and White in New York, where he worked for Charles Follen McKim.

== Career ==
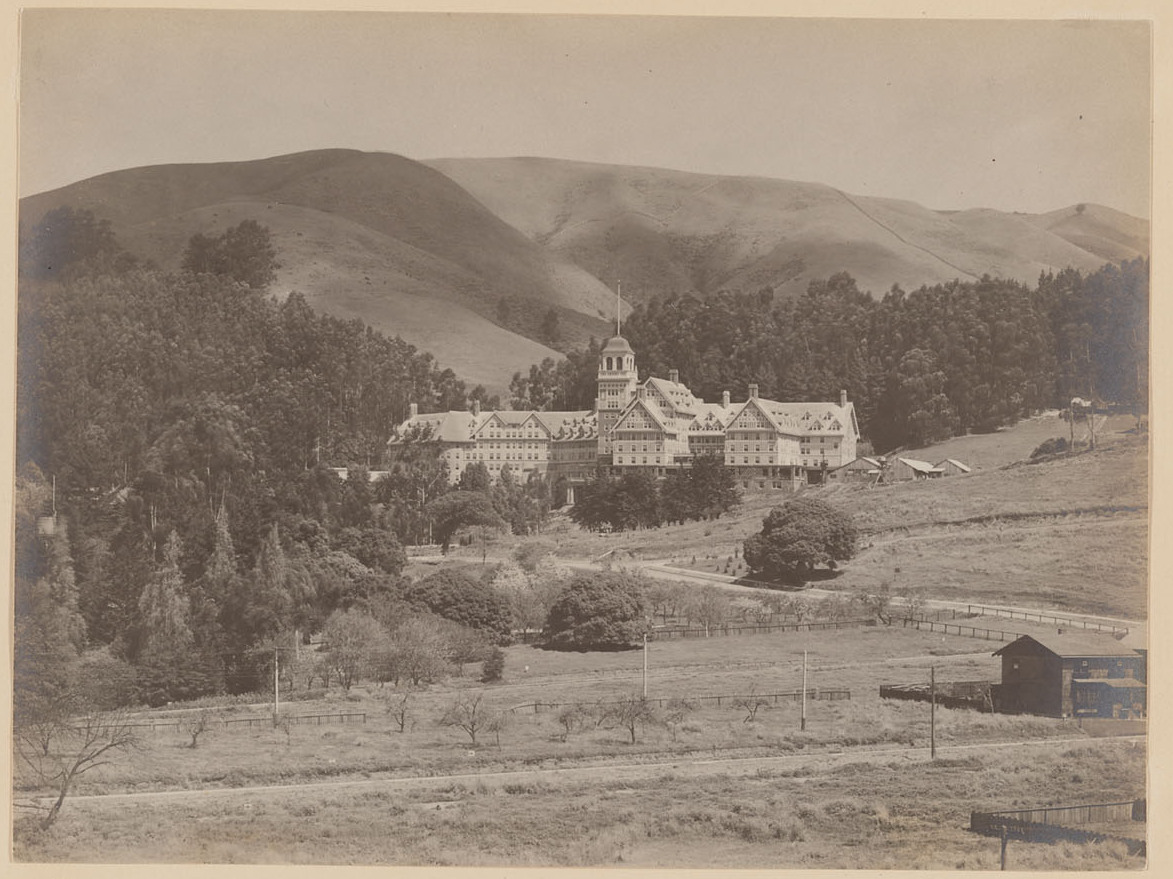
The Claremont Club, c. 1915

Kaiser, as he was still known at the beginning of the twentieth century, moved to Berkeley, California in 1906 and opened a practice there, designing houses and the Claremont Club, as well as houses and the Farmers and Merchants Bank in Sacramento. In 1916, he moved to Palo Alto and established his practice in San Francisco.

Responding to anti-German sentiment during World War I, he reversed his middle and last names in 1917, calling himself "Charles Kaiser Sumner."

Sumner designed as many as fifty houses in Palo Alto, with twenty houses on the Stanford University campus. His work was primarily residential, with occasional commercial or institutional clients. At the request and personal expense of National Park Service director Stephen T. Mather, Sumner designed the Rangers' Club in Yosemite National Park in 1928. It is now a National Historic Landmark.

== Later years and death ==
Sumner practiced until 1941. He died in Palo Alto on May 25, 1948.
