= Hetch Hetchy Railroad =

Railroad in California, USA (1917–1949)

Overview
- Headquarters: Groveland
- Locale: East Central California
- Dates of operation: 1917–1949

Technical
- Track gauge: 4 ft 8 1/2 in (1,435 mm) standard gauge

The Hetch Hetchy Railroad (HHRR) was a 68-mile (109 km) standard gauge Class III railroad constructed by the City of San Francisco to support the construction and expansion of the O'Shaughnessy Dam across Hetch Hetchy Valley.

Based in Groveland, the HHRR operated from 1917 to 1949. It primarily carried construction crews and materials, but also took excursion passengers, freight, and mail. The line extended from its western terminus at Hetch Hetchy Junction (a junction with the Sierra Railroad at Sierra milepost 26, 1,000 feet (300 m) elevation at 37.802°N 120.488°W), topping out at Poopenaut Pass at 5,064 feet (1,544 m) elevation (37.9012°N 119.8381°W), to its eastern terminus at about 3,800 feet (1,200 m) elevation on the rim of the Hetch Hetchy Valley (est. 37.947°N 119.783°W) above the construction site.

The mountainous terrain resulted in steep grades (over 4%) and extremely sharp curves (30 degrees, a 190-foot (58 m) radius), requiring trains to move slowly, at speeds of less than 8 miles per hour (13 km/h).

== History ==
=== Construction of O'Shaughnessy Dam ===
With the passage of the Raker Act in 1913, San Francisco began to plan to tap the Tuolumne River watershed for water and power. A key element of the plan was a new reservoir in the Hetch Hetchy Valley, but access to the area was poor, so a railroad was planned. The first 9 miles (14 km) were completed in 1915, and the remaining 59 miles (95 km) were completed by October 1917. Construction costs for the HHRR were about US$3 million, far less than what the city might have paid contractors to transport concrete and other materials for the dam over the rough terrain.

Hetch Hetchy Railroad operated as a common carrier from July 1918 to February 1925 while the dam was under construction. As a common carrier it was subject to rules of the California Railroad Commission, so there are published time tables and tariffs for this period. However, unlike most common carriers, the president of the railroad was San Francisco Mayor James Rolph, and the vice president and general manager was the construction project's chief engineer Michael O'Shaughnessy. Revenue to support operation of the railroad was generated by charging timber companies and others along the line for freight. The line also carried mail for those in the area.

Since the support of the public in San Francisco was essential to the remote construction project's success, excursion trains were run to the site. For about US$30, passengers would board a sleeper car in San Francisco on Friday night, crossing California's Central Valley overnight, then boarding Hetch Hetchy line excursion cars on Saturday morning. Tourists spent two days viewing the construction site and the surrounding forest, spending Saturday night in bunkhouses and eating meals prepared on site. On Sunday afternoon they boarded the train for the trip back down the mountain, met the sleeper cars for the Sunday night valley crossing, and arrived back in San Francisco on Monday morning in time to go to work.

=== Raising the O'Shaughnessy Dam ===
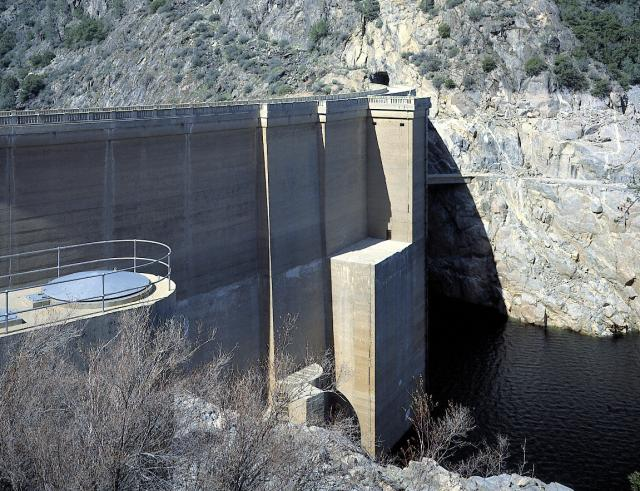
O'Shaughnessy Dam

Intensive operations supporting the construction of the dam were complete in 1923, but the rail line continued operating as a freight and mail hauler, especially in winter when roads were too muddy for freight or were snowbound.

Between 1934 and 1938 the line was pressed back into construction service while the height of the dam was increased from 364 feet (111 m) to the present 430 feet (130 m) above bedrock. Since repairs were necessary before the line could again haul heavy freight to support construction hauling, and it was the height of the Great Depression, an Emergency Relief Act provided about 600 workers to refurbish the line. Operations of the restored line were turned over to the Sierra Railroad, and the reconstituted railroad started operations May 13, 1935, with a train of four cars powered by Sierra engines #30 and #32.

=== Decline and deconstruction ===
The amount of freight that remained to be hauled after construction activity ceased in 1938 was not sufficient to continue using steam engines; gasoline locomotives were used instead. Rain washouts and difficulties clearing heavy snowfalls made winter operations very difficult. The station at Hetch Hetchy Junction was removed in 1938. Sidings and spurs were ripped up and the steel sold to support the war effort in the early 1940s, and structures in Groveland were removed in 1944. Roads into the area improved, and with low usage the railroad tracks deteriorated. In 1949, the entire line was dismantled.

An abandoned HHRR bridge across the Tuolumne River was removed between 1967 and 1971 to clear the canyon for the expansion of Lake Don Pedro.

Several parts of the railroad's right-of-way were used for roadbeds: State Highway 120 in Big Oak Flat, and Cherry Lake Road to Camp Mather and beyond to the O'Shaughnessy Dam.

== Stations ==
- Milepost 50 — Jones Station — The site is marked by an old apple tree. In 2004, volunteers with metal detectors found stove parts, several nails indicating building locations, cans, buttons, cooking implements, and many other artifacts.

== Rolling stock ==
=== Locomotives ===
Seven locomotives saw regular service. Six were owned by the HHRR and one was leased from the Sierra Railroad.

==== Hetch Hetchy Railroad #1 ====
The Heisler locomotive #1 was a geared locomotive engine that was needed to negotiate the 4% slope most of the railroad track was built on. It was the first locomotive purchased, secondhand, when San Francisco began buying locomotives for the HHRR in 1917. War time (World War I) restrictions and waiting periods precluded buying anything but the Heiselers. Heisler locomotive #2 was bought new for $24,100 and had immediate delivery.

==== Hetch Hetchy Railroad #2 ====
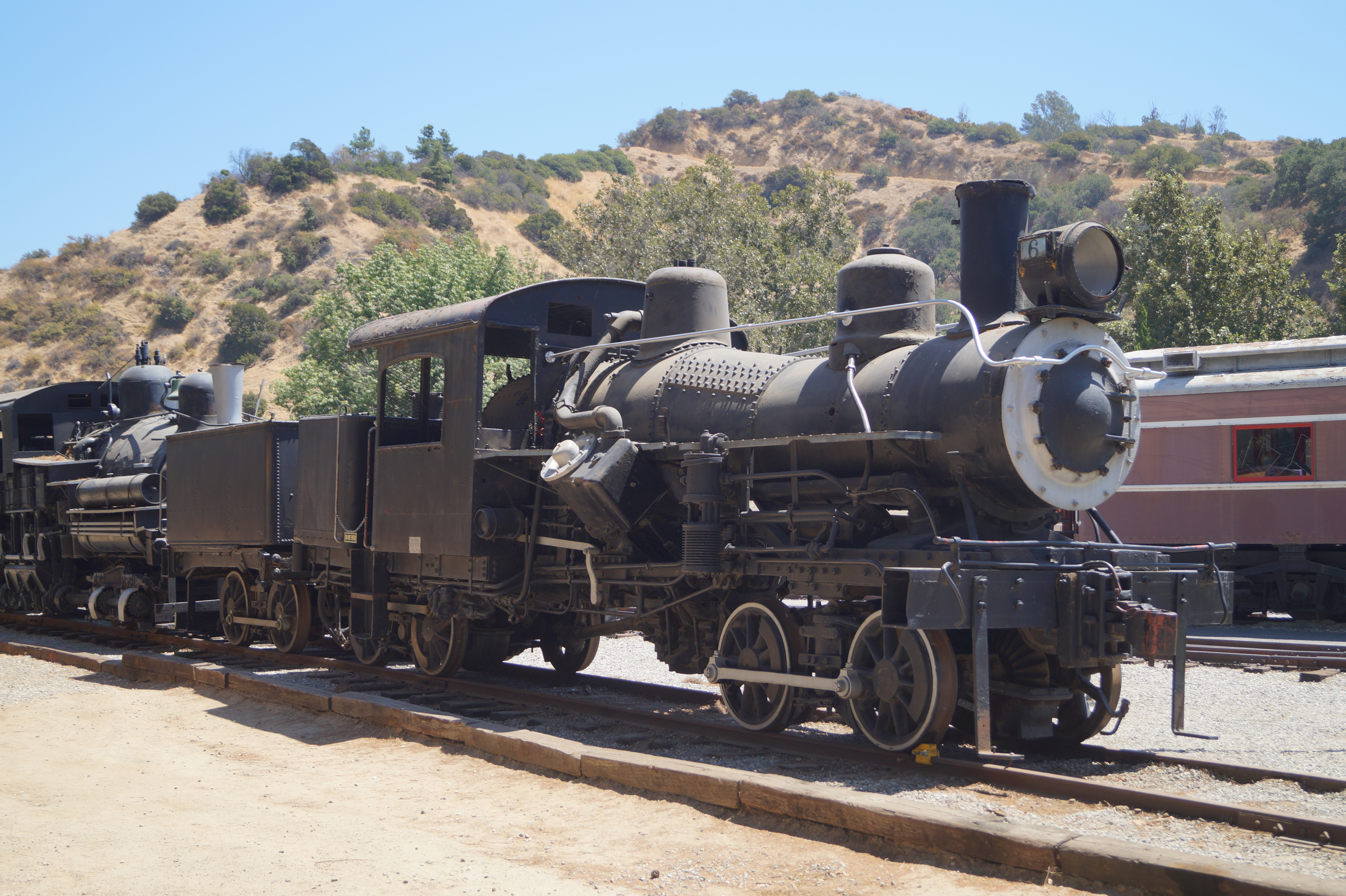
Hetch Hetchy Railroad #2 in the Travel Town Museum in Los Angeles, 2017

The Heisler locomotive that would eventually become Pickering Lumber #2 was one of the first locomotives purchased when San Francisco began buying for the HHRR in 1917. Built in 1918, it may have worked tender to tender with Hetch Hetchy #4. In 1923 #2 was sold to Standard Lumber Company which became Pickering Lumber.

==== Hetch Hetchy Railroad #3 ====
Baldwin #35780 was built in 1910 and saw first service as Youngstown & Ohio River #1. It became Hetch Hetchy Railroad #3 in 1919. In 1927, about three years after HHRR passenger service was discontinued, this engine was sold and transported to Grants Pass to become California & Oregon Coast #301. In 1941 it became Ideal Cement Company #301, which was retired around 1950.

The numbers for HHRR #3: 2-8-2, cylinders with 21-inch (530 mm) bore and 24-inch (610 mm) stroke, 46-inch (1,200 mm) drivers, 165 pounds per square inch (1.14 MPa) boiler pressure, 167,000 pounds (75.7 t) total weight, 131,000 pounds (59.4 t) on drivers, 31,330 pounds-force (139.36 kN) TE.

==== Hetch Hetchy Railroad #4 ====
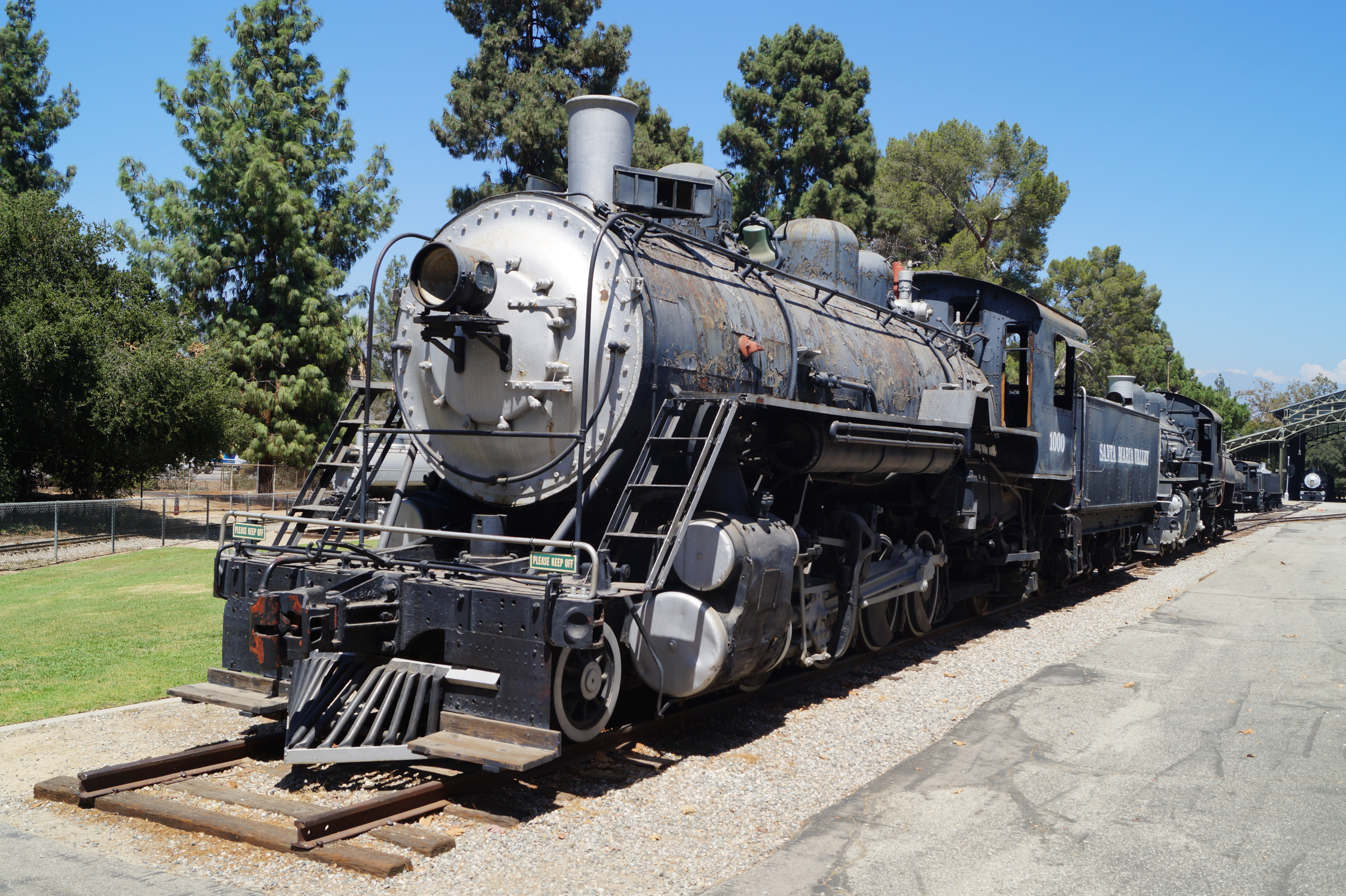
Hetch Hetchy Railroad #4 (renumbered #1000) in the Travel Town Museum in Los Angeles, 2017

Hetch Hetchy Railroad #4 was built in 1920 by American Locomotive Company. This 2-8-2 Mikado had cylinders with 20-inch (510 mm) bore and 28-inch (710 mm) stroke, 48-inch (1,200 mm) drivers, weighed 97 short tons (88 t) and had an overall length of 79 feet 10 inches (24.33 m). In 1924 when HHRR sold five engines, this one went to the Newaukum Valley Railroad in Washington where it was renumbered #1000. In 1944 it was sold to the Santa Maria Valley Railroad, and in 1958 it was donated to the Travel Town museum in Los Angeles, California.

==== Hetch Hetchy Railroad #5 ====
Hetch Hetchy #5 is a 2-6-2 built by Alco/Cooke in 1921, construction number 62965. This engine saw service on HHRR through the raising of the dam in the 1930s, then in 1937 it was sold to Weyerhaeuser who moved it to Vail, Washington and gave it #100. In 1948 Weyerhaeuser moved it to Sutherlin, Oregon where it rests in Central Park (43.39063°N 123.30926°W).

In November 2007, talks began between the City of Sutherlin and (OTM) Oregon Transportation Museum's owner Don Kirk, to relocate his museum to Sutherlin. Those talks specified, that if the museum relocates to Sutherlin, the city would agree to OTM looking at #100's fitness for a possible full operating condition restoration, for use in museum tourist excursion service.

==== Hetch Hetchy Railroad #6 ====
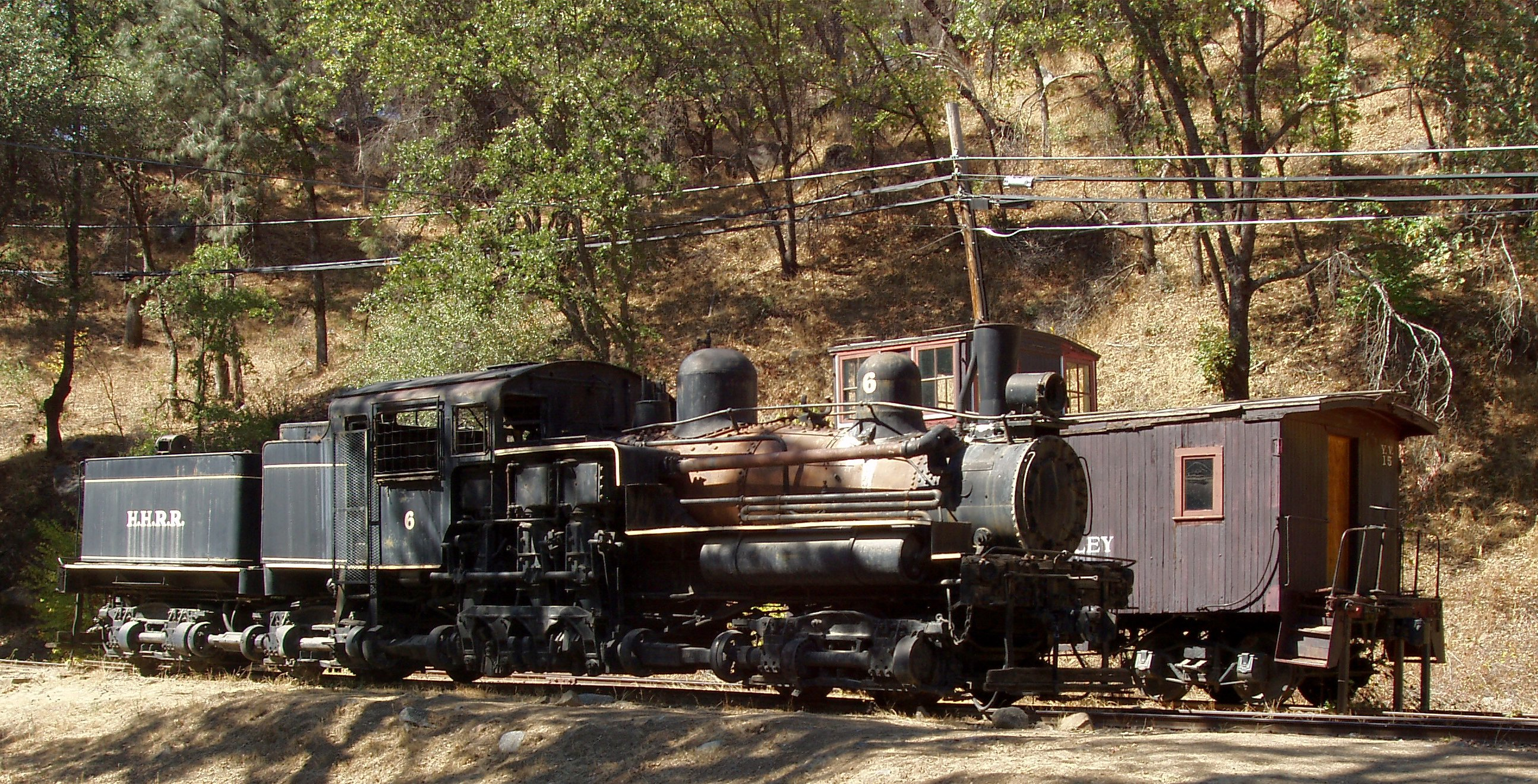
Hetch Hetchy Railroad Number 6

Hetch Hetchy #6 is a three truck 167,200 pounds (75,800 kg) Class C Shay locomotive built in 1921. Hetch Hetchy Railroad Engine No.6 was added to the National Register of Historic Places, in 1978.

==== Sierra Railroad #12 ====
Sierra #12 is the oldest three truck Shay in existence. It was built for the Sierra Railroad in 1903, leased to the HHR during construction of the dam, and then sold to Standard Lumber (which became Pickering Lumber) in 1924. It was sold to Connel Brothers Trucking around 1962 and then to the Pacific Locomotive Association in 1966. It is currently stored out of service at the Niles Canyon Railway.

=== Other stock ===
Hetch Hetchy Railroad Motorcar No. 19 appears in a list of equipment invited to Railfair '99. This motorcar is in the collection of Railtown 1897.
