= Hetch Hetchy 6 =

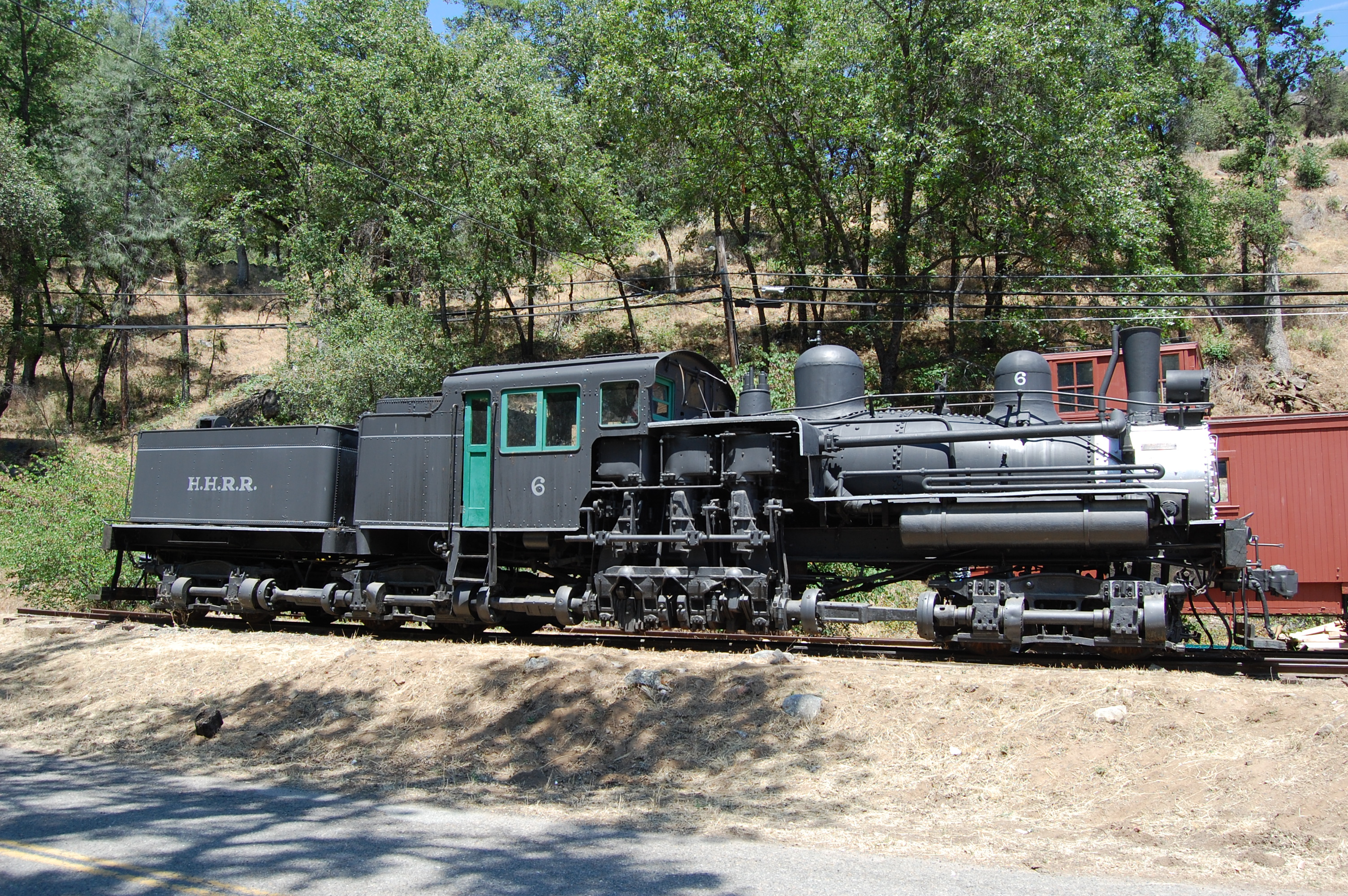
- Hetch Hetchy Engine No. 6
Type and origin
- Power type: Steam
- Builder: Lima Locomotive Works
- Serial number: 3170
- Model: 80-ton Class C Shay
- Build date: November 1921
Specifications
- Configuration
  - Whyte: 3-truck Shay
  - AAR: B-B-B
  - UIC: B’B′B′ n3t
- Gauge: 4 ft 8 1/2 in (1,435 mm)
- Driver dia.: 36 in (914 mm)
- Adhesive weight: 167,200 lb (76 t)
- Total weight: 167,200 lb (76 t)
- Fuel type: Oil
- Fuel capacity: 1,800 US gal (6,814 L)
- Water cap.: 3,500 US gal (13,249 L)
- Boiler: 50 in (1,270 mm)
- Cylinders: Three
- Cylinder size: 13 1/2 in × 15 in (343 mm × 381 mm)
Performance figures
- Tractive effort: 35,100 lbf (156 kN)
Career
- Operators: 1921–1926: Hetch Hetchy Railroad; 1926–1958: Pickering Lumber Corp.
- Numbers: 6
- Retired: 1958
- Current owner: El Portal Transportation Museum
- Disposition: Static display
- Hetch Hetchy Railroad Engine No.6
- U.S. National Register of Historic Places
- Location within California Location within the United States
- Location: CA 140, El Portal, California
- Coordinates: 37°40′27″N 119°47′11″W
- Area: less than one acre
- Built: 1921
- Architect: Lima Locomotive Co.
- Architectural style: 3T Shay Locomotive
- NRHP reference No.: 78000360
- Added to NRHP: January 30, 1978

Hetch Hetchy Railroad no. 6 is a standard gauge three truck Shay locomotive built for the Hetch Hetchy Railroad by Lima Locomotive Works in 1921.

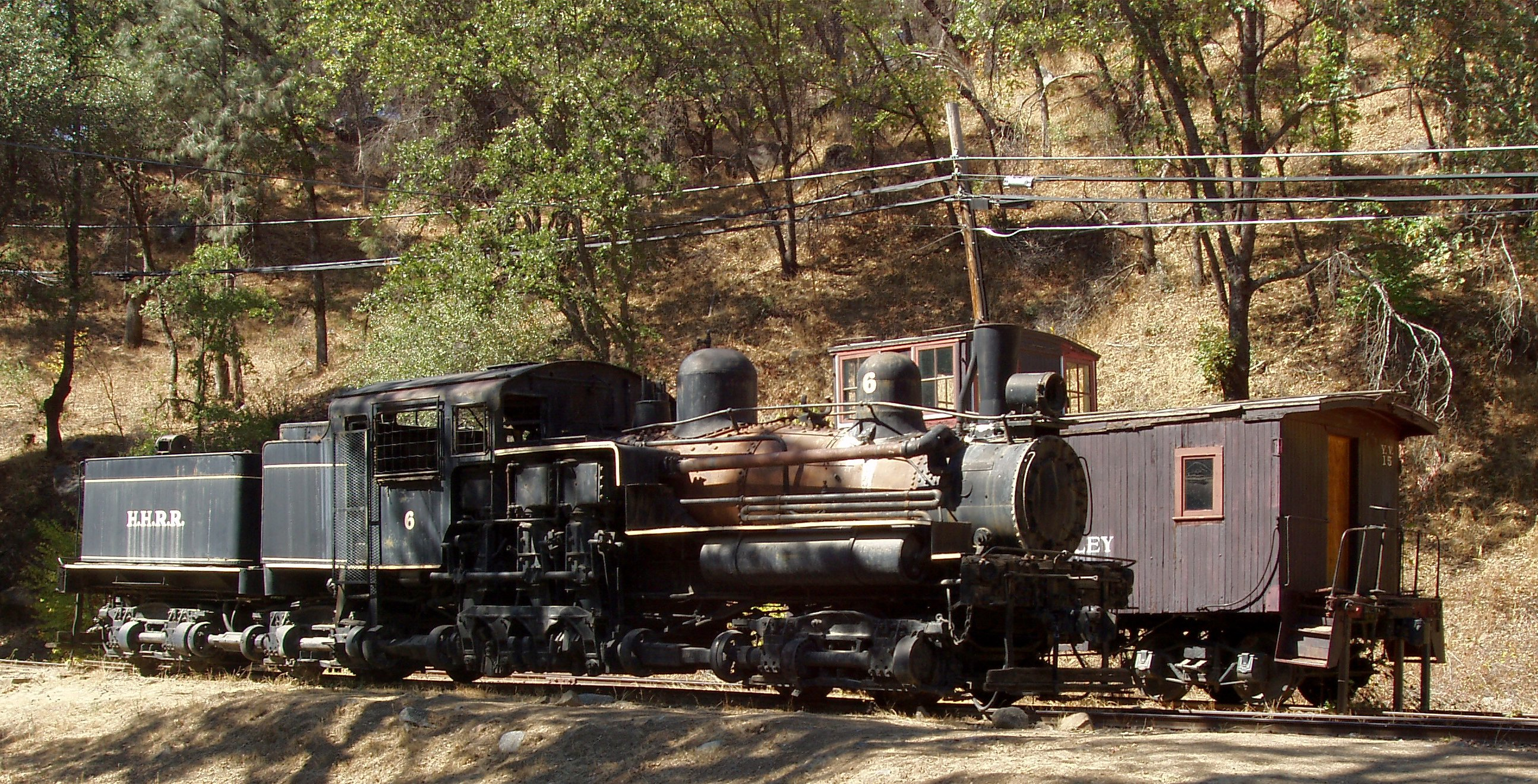
Hetch Hetchy Engine No. 6 prior to restoration

Although it operated as a common carrier, the Hetch Hetchy Railroad was built by the City of San Francisco to build the O'Shaughnessy Dam across Hetch Hetchy Valley as part of the city's water supply. The dam was completed in 1923 and the railroad scaled back operations, selling some of its equipment, including #6, which was sold to Pickering Lumber Corporation in Standard, California. The locomotive served Pickering's logging operations until 1958 when it was retired.

The railroad operated four Shays at different times. Number 6 was by far the largest, the only three truck Shay of the lot and weighing more than twice as much as the others.

It is in a small collection of railroad equipment owned by the National Park Service near El Portal, California. Number 6 was added to the National Register of Historic Places in 1978 as Hetch Hetchy Railroad Engine No.6.
