= Hodgdon Homestead Cabin =

Historic house in California, United States

- U.S. National Register of Historic Places
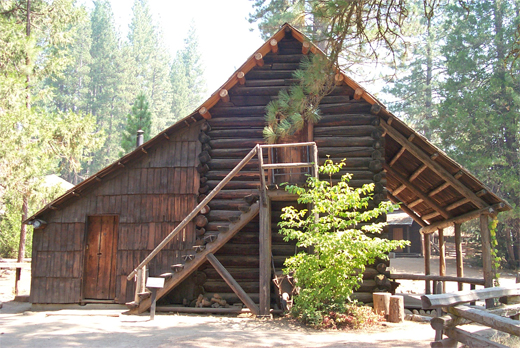

- Location within California Location within the United States
- Location: Yosemite National Park, Wawona, California
- Coordinates: 37°32′20″N 119°39′19″W
- Area: less than one acre
- Built: 1879
- Architect: Hodgdon, Jeremiah
- NRHP reference No.: 78000356
- Added to NRHP: June 9, 1978

The Hodgdon Homestead Cabin was built by Jeremiah Hodgdon in 1879 in the Aspen Valley area of what became Yosemite National Park. The two-story log cabin, measuring 22 feet (6.7 m) by 30 feet (9.1 m), was located in an inholding in the park, owned by Hodgdon's descendants. In the 1950s the family proposed to demolish the structure. The National Park Service acquired it and moved it to its Pioneer Yosemite History Center at Wawona, where the restored cabin is part of an exhibit on early settlement and development of the Yosemite area. In addition to housing Hogdon, the cabin housed workers on the Great Sierra Wagon Road in the 1880s, as a patrol cabin for U.S. Army troops who managed the new national park in the 1890s, and as a historic landmark at the old Aspen Valley Resort.

The cabin is built of peeled logs, saddle-notched, with split log wedge chinking. A shed addition to the rear gives the structure the shape of a saltbox and is a frame structure covered with wood shingles. The cabin is fronted by a porch.

The Hodgdon Cabin was placed on the National Register of Historic Places on June 9, 1978.

== See also ==
Other structures at the Pioneer Yosemite History Center include:

- Acting Superintendent's Headquarters
- Chris Jorgenson Studio
- Wawona Covered Bridge
