= Acting Superintendent's Headquarters =

- U.S. National Register of Historic Places
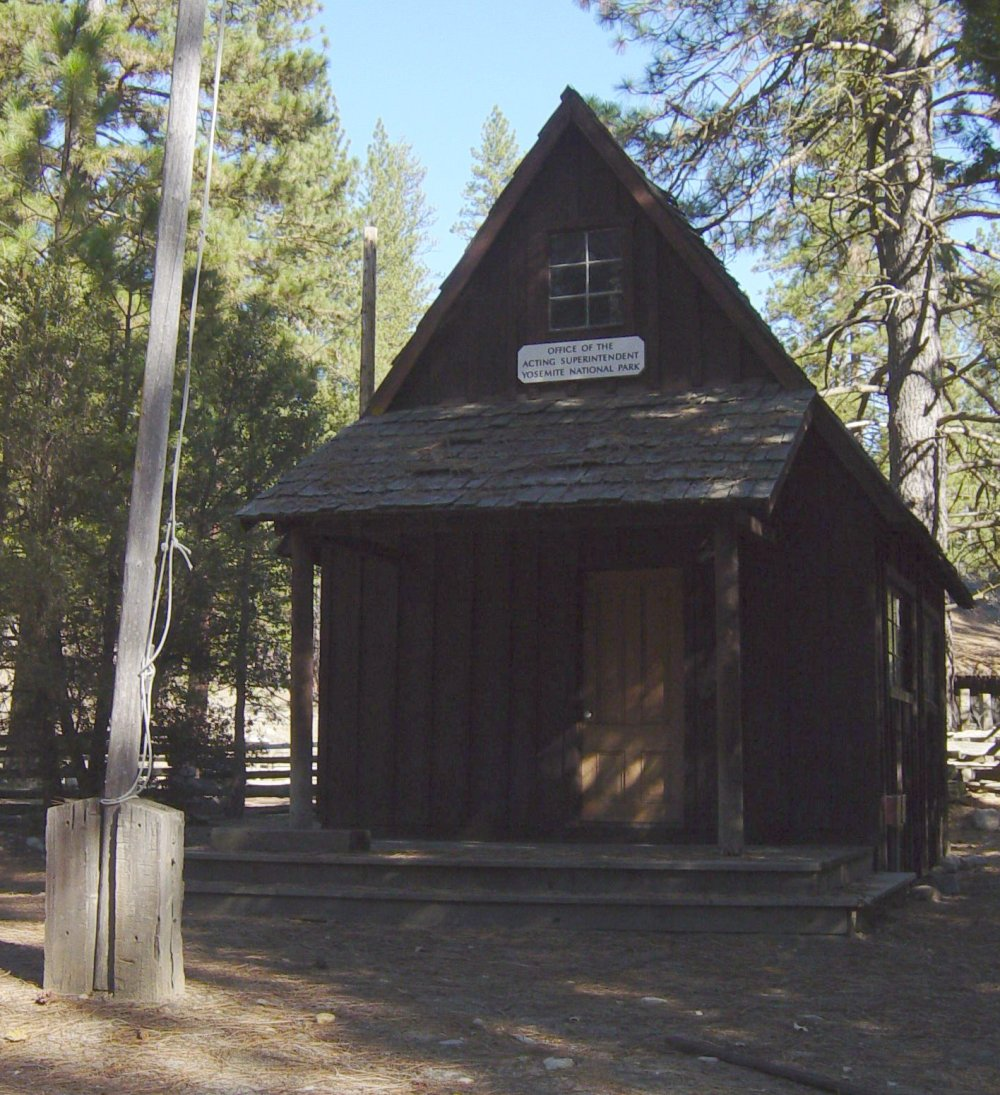

- Location within California Location within the United States
- Location: Yosemite National Park, Wawona, California
- Coordinates: 37°32′20″N 119°39′17″W
- Area: less than one acre
- Built: 1904
- Architect: U.S. Army
- NRHP reference No.: 78000362
- Added to NRHP: June 9, 1978

The Acting Superintendent's Headquarters in Yosemite National Park was built by the U.S. Army at Camp A.E. Wood in the Wawona district of the park in 1904 to house the commander of the military administration that operated the park in the years prior to the establishment of the National Park Service. It was moved to the Yosemite Valley in 1906. The Acting Superintendent's Headquarters is the last remaining structure at Wawona associated with the park's military administration. The cabin followed the military to the Yosemite Valley, remaining there until 1958, when it was moved back to Wawona. It is part of the Pioneer Yosemite History Center.

The cabin is a 15-foot (4.6 m) by 12-foot (3.7 m) 1 1/2-story frame structure with board-and-batten siding and redwood shingle roof. The roof is very steeply pitched. A small porch fronts the building. It was used as a residence while in the Yosemite Valley. It is now part of an exhibit on the Army administration in the park.

The Acting Superintendent's Headquarters was placed on the National Register of Historic Places on June 9, 1978.

== See also ==
- Other structures at the Pioneer Yosemite History Center include:

- Chris Jorgenson Studio
- Hodgdon Homestead Cabin
- Wawona Covered Bridge

- National Register of Historic Places listings in Yosemite National Park
