= Merced Grove Ranger Station =

- U.S. National Register of Historic Places
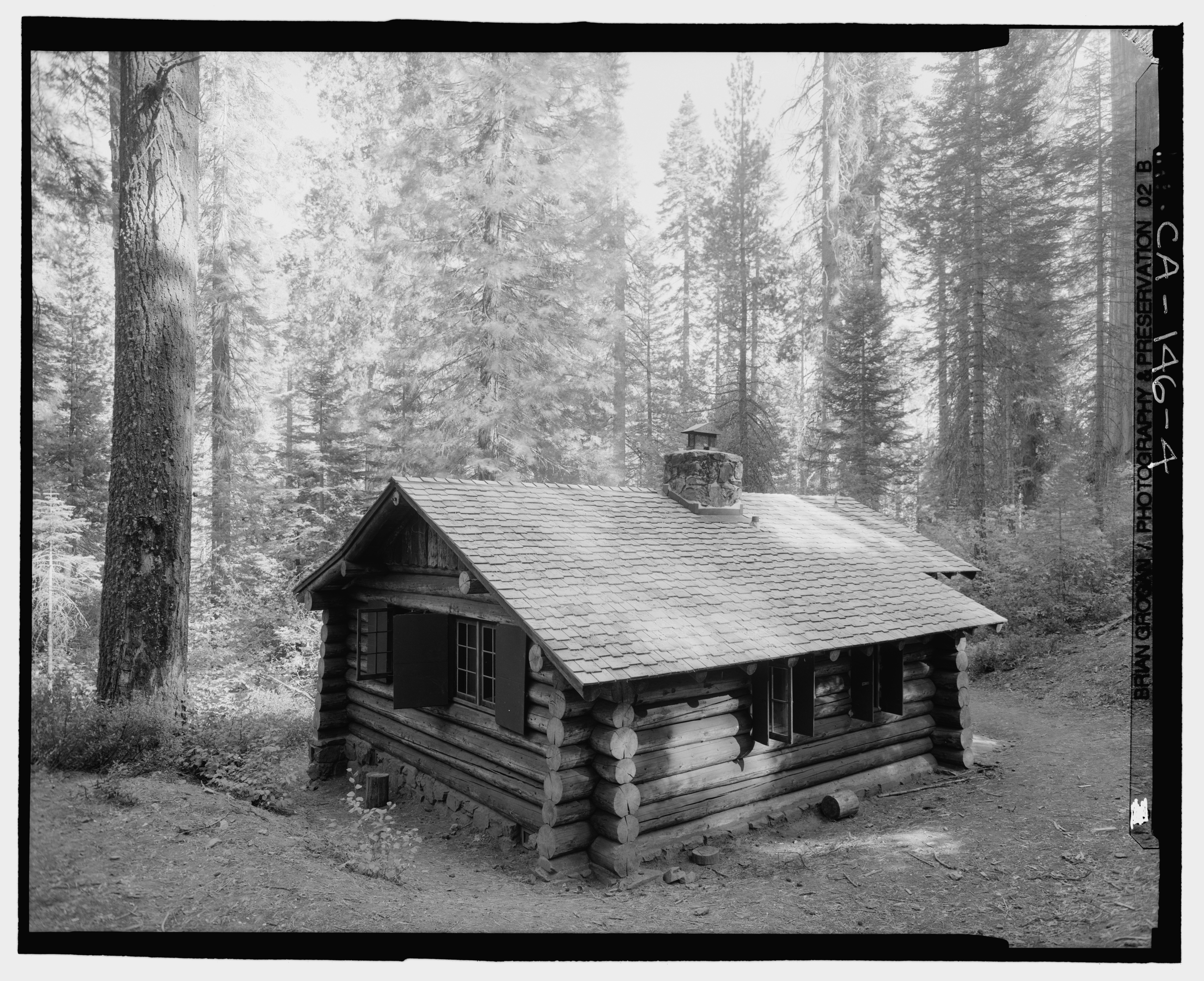
- Merced Grove Ranger Station in 2001

- Location within California Location within the United States
- Location: N. of El Portal in Yosemite National Park, El Portal, California
- Coordinates: 37°44′56″N 119°50′21″W
- Built: 1934–1935
- Architect: National Park Service
- NRHP reference No.: 78000358
- Added to NRHP: June 15, 1978

The Merced Grove Ranger Station in Yosemite National Park was designed by the National Park Service and completed in 1935. The station is located near the Merced Grove of giant sequoias in the Crane Flat region of the park. It was listed on the National Register of Historic Places in 1978.

== Design ==
This design, inspired by pioneer log cabins in the Sierra foothills, features sloped log ends and tightly fitted logs, making it a unique architectural design within the park. It stands as a notable example of Yosemite’s rustic architecture blending naturally with its surroundings.

Measuring approximately 24 by 28 feet (7.3 by 8.5 meters), the cabin features precisely adzed logs, eliminating the need for chinking and creating exceptionally tight walls for a log structure. The building consists of a living room, bedroom, and kitchen. To the north of the cabin, up a hill, are two small outhouses.

== Use ==
The Merced Grove Ranger Station was built as a replacement for the 1915 checking station on the Coulterville Road, the first stagecoach road into Yosemite. The cabin served as a summer retreat for Yosemite Park Superintendents, including Carl Russell, who worked on his writing of Yosemite history there.
