= Chris Jorgensen Studio =

- U.S. National Register of Historic Places
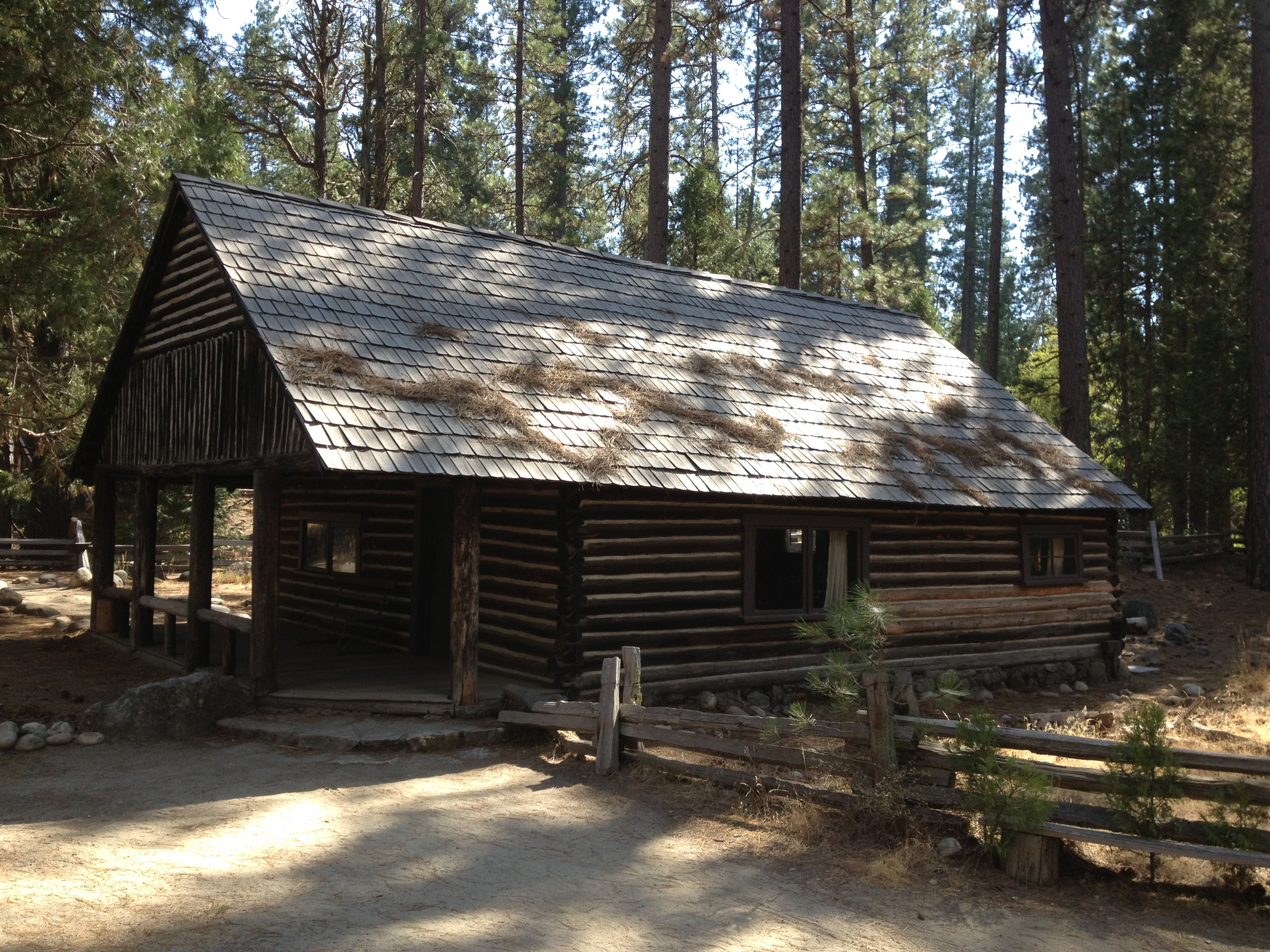
- Chris Jorgensen Studio

- Location within California Location within the United States
- Location: Pioneer Yosemite Historic Center, Yosemite National Park, California
- Coordinates: 37°32′20″N 119°39′19″W
- Area: less than one acre
- Built: 1899
- Architect: Jorgensen, Christian
- NRHP reference No.: 79000280
- Added to NRHP: April 13, 1979

The Chris Jorgensen Studio is a one-room log building, built in 1904 as an artist's studio for Chris Jorgensen in the Yosemite Valley. Jorgensen, an instructor and assistant director of the California School of Fine Arts, arrived in Yosemite in the 1890s. Jorgensen studied and depicted local Native Americans from 1899, collecting native basketwork. The National Park Service acquired the Jorgensen Studio in 1919, calling it the Yosemite Museum. Jorgensen donated his basket collection to the museum in 1923. Jorgensen's widow, Angela Ghiardelli, donated many of Jorgensen's works to the museum following his death in 1935.

From the 1920s the Park Service worked to remove what were regarded as intrusive structures in the center of the valley. The Jorgensen Studio was moved to the Wawona area in 1962 to become part of the Pioneer Yosemite History Center as part of a Mission 66 program to assemble historic structures at the location.

The one story cabin measures 22 feet (6.7 m) by 37 feet (11 m) with a steep gable roof that extends beyond the front of the cabin to form a porch. The gable over the porch is decorated by a vertical log infill pattern, with a sleeping loft within. a massive stone fireplace dominates the left side elevation

The Jorgensen Studio was placed on the National Register of Historic Places on April 13, 1979.

== See also ==
Other structures at the Pioneer Yosemite History Center include:

- Acting Superintendent's Headquarters
- Hodgdon Homestead Cabin
- Wawona Covered Bridge
