= Yosemite Village Historic District =

Historic district in California, United States

- U.S. National Register of Historic Places
- U.S. Historic district
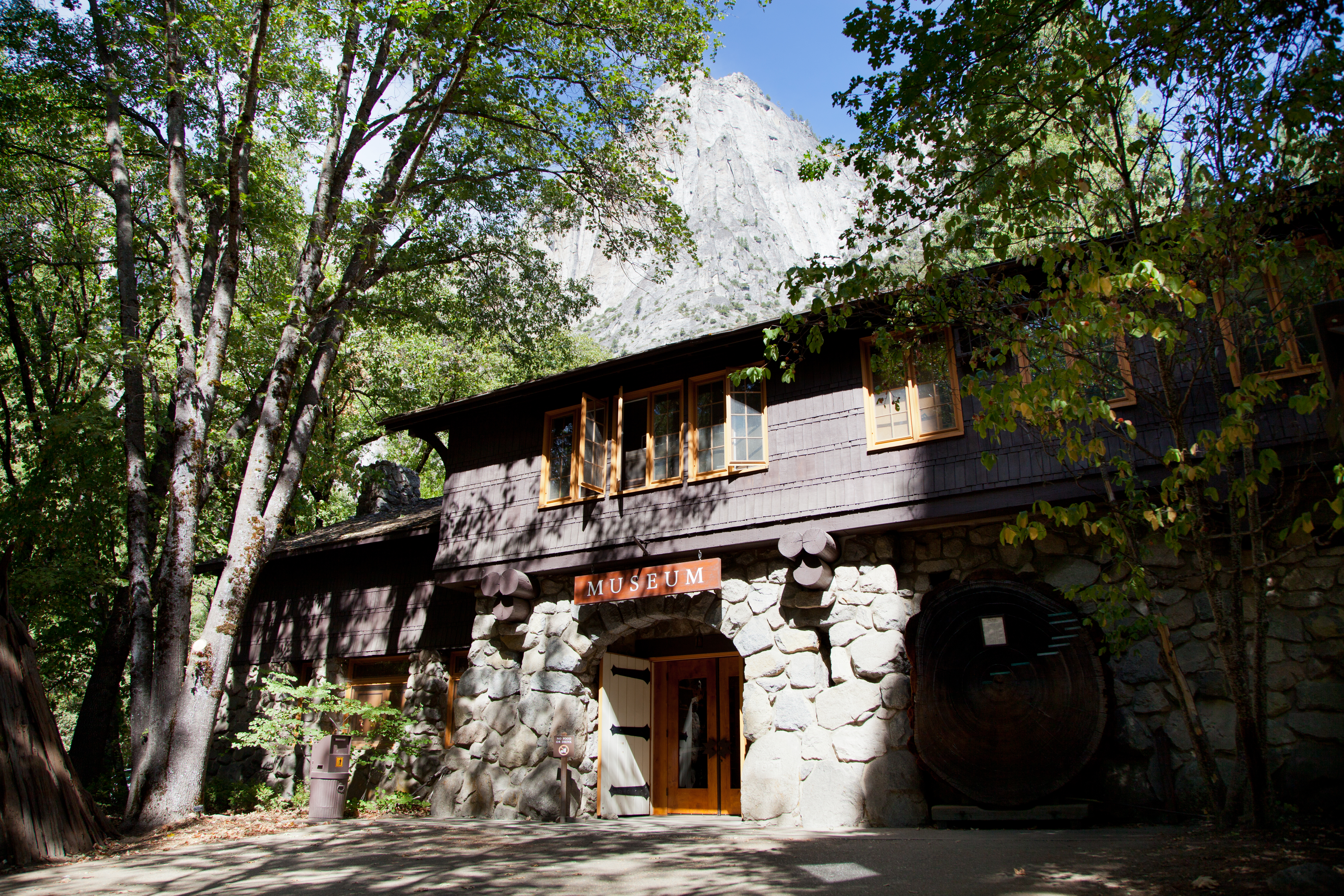

- Location within California Location within the United States
- Nearest city: El Portal, California
- Coordinates: 37°44′55″N 119°35′18″W
- Area: 46 acres (19 ha)
- Built: 1855
- Architect: Multiple
- Architectural style: Rustic
- NRHP reference No.: 78000354
- Added to NRHP: March 30, 1978

The Yosemite Village Historic District encompasses the primary built-up section of the Yosemite Valley as it was developed by the National Park Service for Yosemite National Park. The district includes visitor services areas, park personnel residences and administrative facilities. It is located to the north of the Merced River. The district includes the National Historic Landmark Rangers' Club.

== Settlement ==
The Yosemite Village area was settled beginning about 1865, when James Mason Hutchings built a so-called winter cabin for his family as a permanent residence. Hutchings was a successful publisher, and had visited the valley as a tourist in 1855. Nine years later he moved there, successfully lobbying the federal government to cede the valley to the State of California as a park. Hutchings built a mill and planted an apple orchard. No buildings remain from the Hutchings place, but apple trees and a depression that may have been a mill flume remain. The present built-up area was established in 1918, and includes several older buildings that were moved to Yosemite Village from elsewhere. Four buildings were built by the U.S. Army during its tenure as the custodian of Yosemite National Park prior to the establishment of the National Park Service. The other buildings were built from 1918 on as the Park Service moved personnel and services out of the old Yosemite Village that had grown awkwardly around the Sentinel Hotel in the middle of the valley. Most of the structures in the historic district are houses. A portion of the park's administrative district is included in the historic district, including the park headquarters. The period of development in the historic district extends until 1951.

=== John Muir ===
J.M. Hutchings had bought a hotel near the present historic district in 1863. In 1869 he hired John Muir to mill wood from downed trees for new cabins. Muir stayed at first with the Hutchings, then built his own cabin. The location of this cabin is not known with certainty, but is believed to be within the historic district. Muir lived in the cabin for two years, during which time he developed his philosophy of wildland preservation.

== Significant structures ==
The most significant building in the historic district is the Rangers' Club, built at the personal expense of Park Service director Stephen T. Mather in 1924 to house rangers. The National Historic Landmark structure is an early example of the National Park Service rustic style in the park.

Early residences used wood shingles and natural materials, and were rustic in character. From the mid-1920s, following the construction of the Rangers' Club, houses were more explicitly rustic. The Park Superintendent's Residence was built a little apart from the other houses in 1912 by the Army. The Superintendent's Residence was extensively remodeled in the 1920s to National Park Service rustic standards. The residential district was laid out in an informal style by Park Service landscape architect Charles Punchard.

Non-residential buildings include the Administration Building (1924) designed by architect Myron Hunt, the Post Office (1925), and the Museum Building or Valley District Building (1926), both designed by Park Service architect Herbert Maier. All are rustic in character. Other buildings in the area include the Pohono Indian Studio (1925), which is used as a gift shop, and the Ansel Adams Gallery, a complex of five buildings incorporating what was first known as Best's Studio.

The Yosemite Village district was placed on the National Register of Historic Places on March 30, 1978.
