= Track Bus No. 19 =

Historic American railcar

- Hetch Hetchy Motor Car No. 19
- U.S. National Register of Historic Places
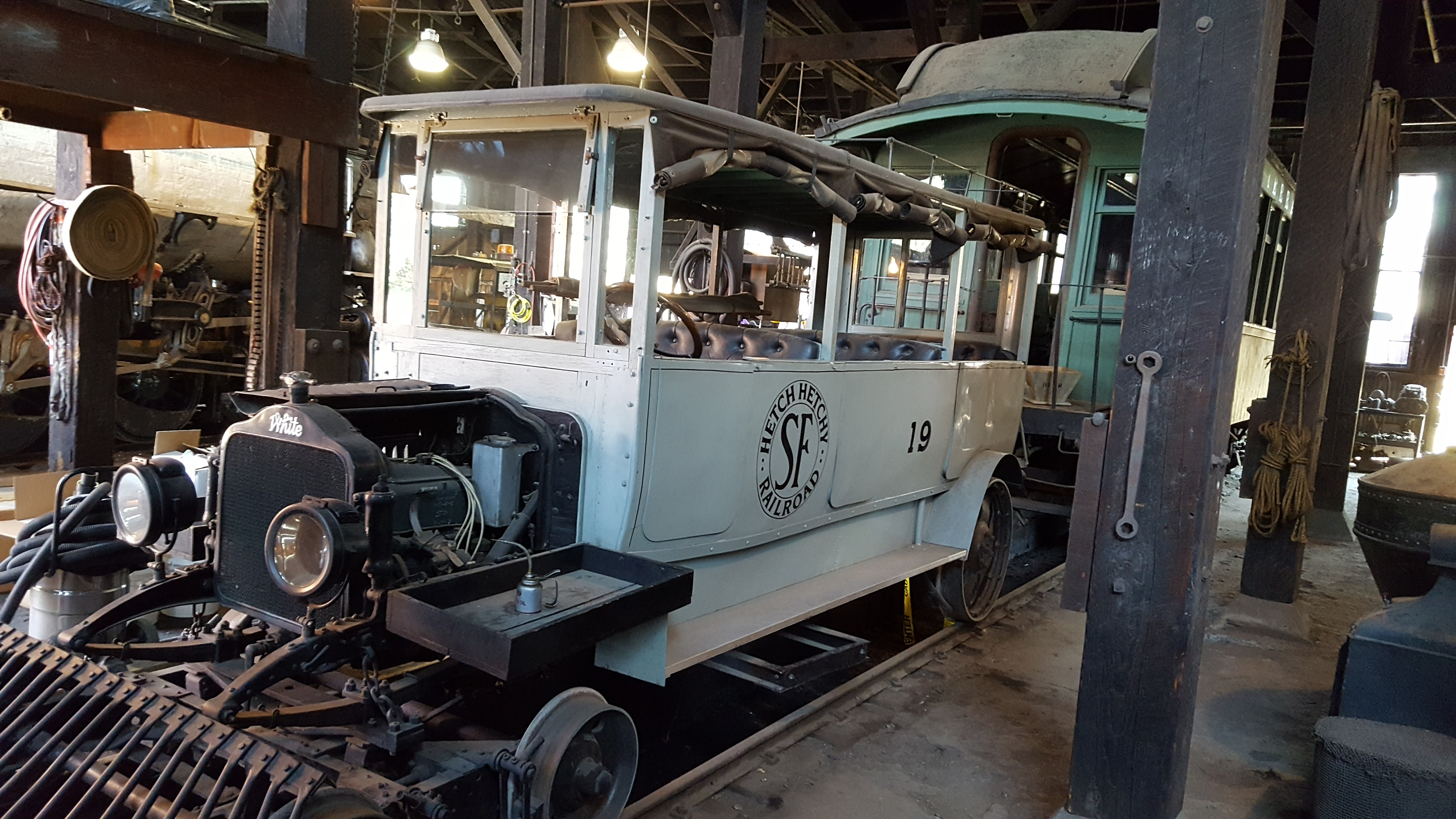

- Location within California Location within the United States
- Location: Railtown 1897 State Historic Park
- Coordinates: 37°57′1″N 120°25′2″W
- Built: 1919
- Built by: Thomson-Graf-Edler
- NRHP reference No.: 78000363
- Added to NRHP: May 22, 1978

Track Bus No. 19 is a motorized rail car built on a White Motor Company standard truck chassis. It was built by Thomson-Graf-Edler in 1919 for the Hetch Hetchy Railroad and used as an ambulance to transport sick, injured or dead workers, and to carry passengers. An additional five similar railcars were ordered, none were exactly the same.

The car sat unused after it was moved to Modesto, then was restored and displayed at the Yosemite Transportation Museum in El Portal. In 1997 No. 19 was donated to Railtown 1897 State Historic Park in Jamestown California.
