= McCauley and Meyer Barns =

- U.S. National Register of Historic Places
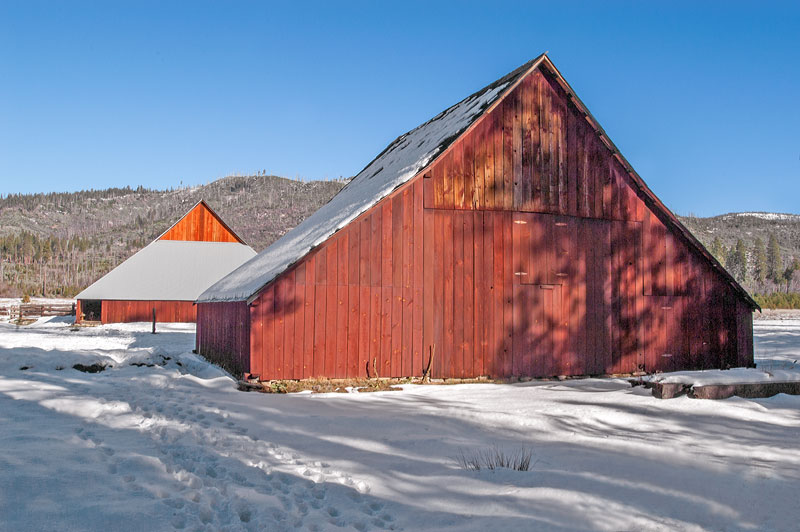
- The Meyer Barns

- Location within California Location within the United States
- Nearest city: El Portal, California
- Coordinates: 37°42′0″N 119°45′18″W
- Area: less than one acre
- Built: 1870
- Architect: James McCauley, George Meyer
- Architectural style: Morman Pole Barn
- NRHP reference No.: 78000353
- Added to NRHP: June 15, 1978

The McCauley and Meyer Barns in Yosemite National Park are the last barns in the park that retain their original characteristics as structures built by homesteaders. The McCauley barn and the two Meyer barns represent different construction techniques and styles of design.

The McCauley Barn was built about 1883 by Irish-born James McCauley, who operated hotels in the Yosemite Valley. McCauley's ranch was to be his winter home, since Glacier Point, where he operated the Glacier Point Mountain House, was not suitable for winter living. McCauley purchased the land in 1883 and began to live full-time at the ranch in 1897. McCauley's son Fred inherited the ranch after James' death in an wagon accident in 1911. Fred dispersed the property, which became known as "Foresta" and was unoccupied after 1955. The National Park Service acquired the ranch in 1974. The barn is a wood structure, with a log cribwork core using V-notched joints, measuring 40 feet (12 m) by 80 feet (24 m). A long center bay is flamed by two more open bays along the long axis of the barn. The overhanging gable roof structure is peeled logs, once covered with wood shingles but now covered with sheet metal. The logs were not chinked, and are presently sheathed with vertical boards. The design is unusual. The "Mormon Pole Barn" style dates to the 1850s in the Genesee Valley.

George Meyer operated a homestead established by his brother Henry in the 1870s in Big Meadow. A ship carpenter in Germany, Meyer married James McCauley's niece Elizabeth in 1900, acquiring the McCauley Ranch in 1923. Meyer Barn No. 1 is a saltbox-shaped timber-framed structure built in the early 1880s. The principal portion of the barn measures 30 feet (9.1 m) by 20 feet (6.1 m), with a lean-to addition 30 feet (9.1 m) by 16 feet (4.9 m). The barn is sheathed in vertical wood siding with a steeply pitched metal roof. The framing is believed to have been built flat and raised into position in five bents.

Meyer Barn No. 2, nearby Barn No. 1 in Big Meadow, is similar in character to the McCauley Barn, measuring about 50 feet (15 m) square, with a hipped roof. It was built in the late 1870s. The center consists of a 25-foot (7.6 m) high saddle-notched log crib that supports the center of the steep roof. The crib was surrounded by stalls for livestock on three sides. The exterior wall is a frame structure covered in vertical board sheathing. The log roof structure was covered with shingles, now by sheet metal.

The barns were listed on the National Register of Historic Places on June 15, 1978.
