= Wawona Covered Bridge =

- U.S. National Register of Historic Places
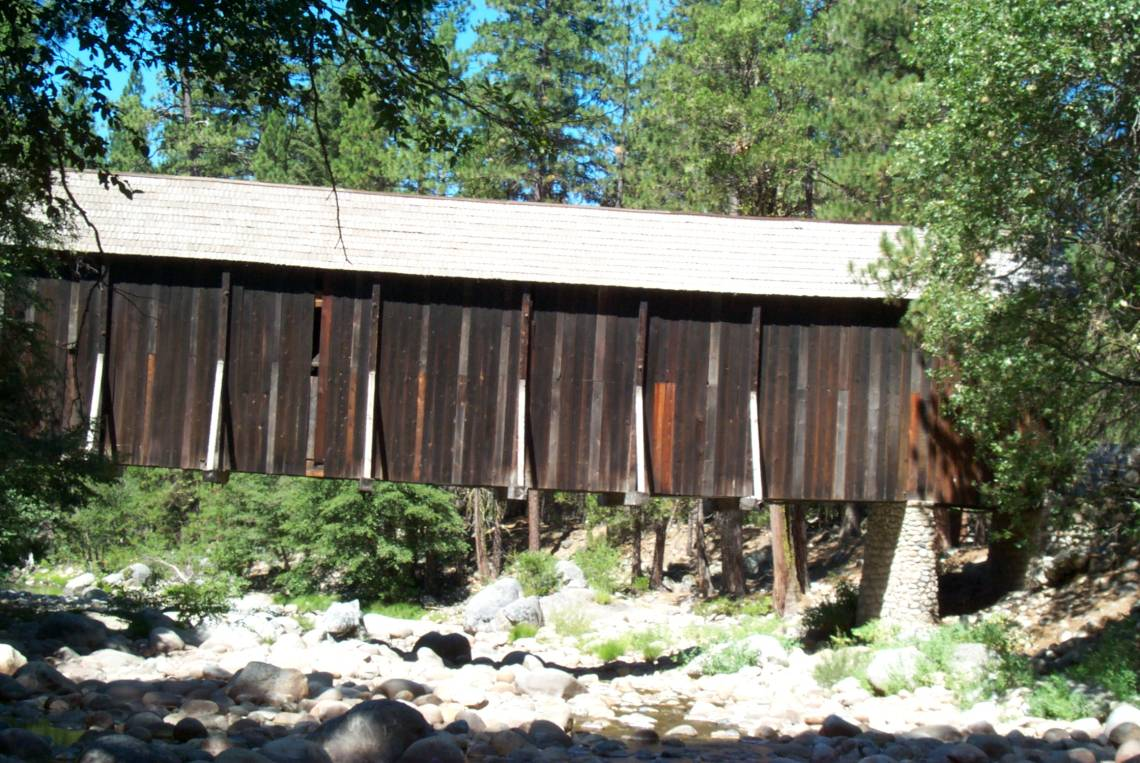

- Location within California Location within the United States
- Location: Pioneer Yosemite History Center, Wawona, California
- Coordinates: 37°32′19″N 119°39′17″W
- Area: 1 acre (0.40 ha)
- Built: 1868
- Architectural style: Modified Queen-post through
- NRHP reference No.: 06001261
- Added to NRHP: January 11, 2007

The Wawona Covered Bridge is a covered bridge spanning the South Fork Merced River near Wawona, California, in Yosemite National Park. The open bridge (without the covering) was built by Galen Clark, the steward of what was then called the Yosemite Grant, in 1868, without its cladding. The open bridge was a component of Clark's proposed new road from Wawona to the Yosemite Valley. Clark was unable to complete the road, which he sold to the Washburn Group of investors along with his stopover lodging (Clark's Station) in 1874. In mid-1875 the Washburn Group completed the road to Yosemite Valley. It is one of twelve remaining covered bridges in California.

== Covered bridge ==
The modified queen post truss was covered with Douglas fir cladding in 1878, enclosing the Ponderosa pine structure and its iron tie rods. The bridge served automobile traffic until 1937, when a new bridge was built about 200 metres (660 ft) to the southwest. The bridge was repaired by Civilian Conservation Corps labor the same year. In 1955 the bridge was damaged by flooding. Marked for replacement on account of the damage and its poor general condition, the bridge was instead reconstructed after National Park Service landscape architect Thomas Chalmers Vint intervened in its favor. Work was funded as part of the Park Service's Mission 66 program, using the bridge as the centerpiece of an interpretive exhibit on the history of the Wawona area. The Pioneer Yosemite History Center was established nearby. The bridge was repaired, with damaged elements replaced in kind. Since 1957 the bridge has had a number of repairs and replacements as materials have deteriorated.

== See also ==
- List of bridges documented by the Historic American Engineering Record in California
- List of covered bridges in California

Other structures at the Pioneer Yosemite History Center include:

- Acting Superintendent's Headquarters
- Chris Jorgenson Studio
- Hodgdon Homestead Cabin
