= Great Sierra Wagon Road =

- U.S. National Register of Historic Places
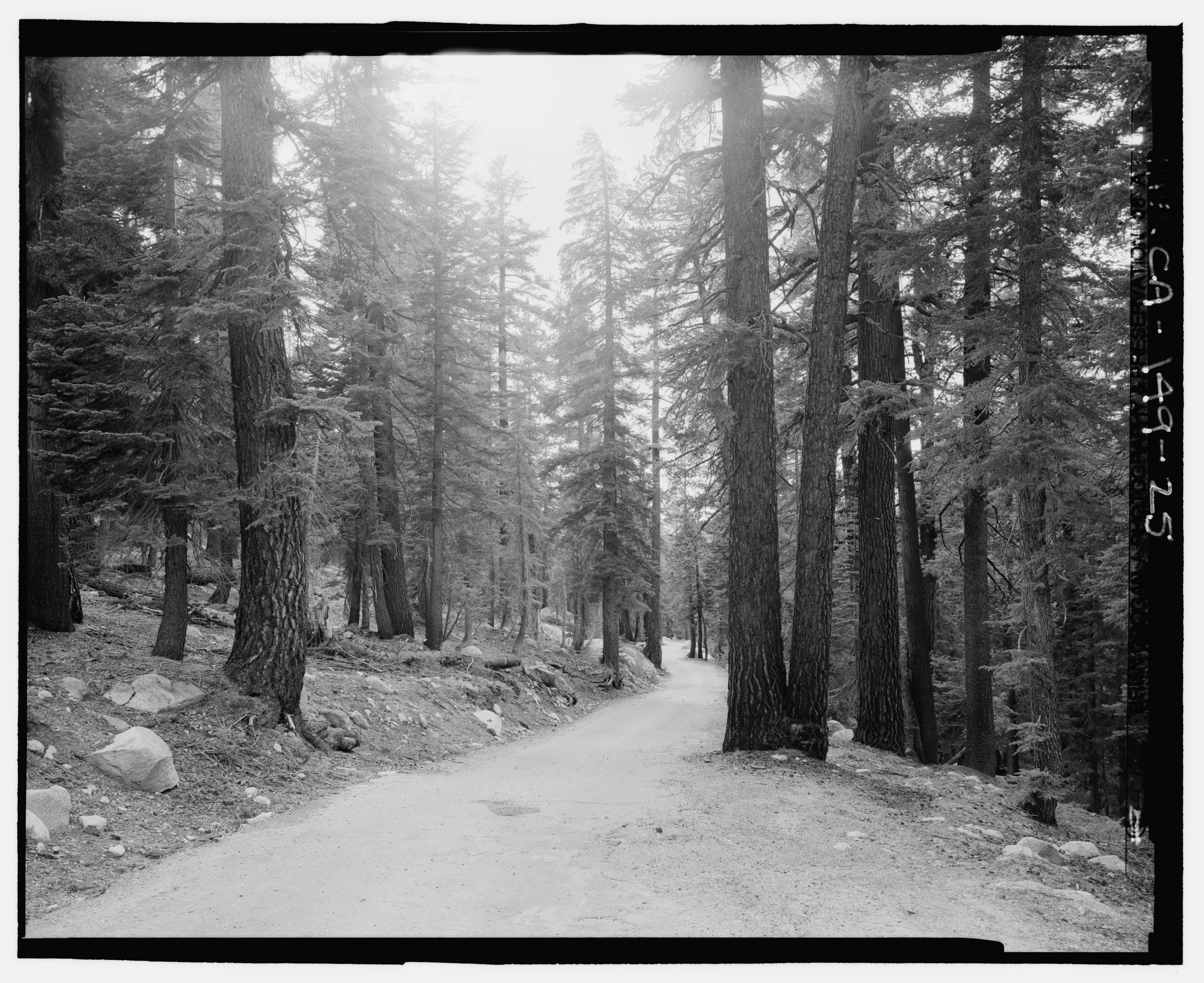
- Old Tioga Road in 2001

- Location within California Location within the United States
- Nearest city: Yosemite Valley, California
- Coordinates: 37°50′32″N 119°43′20″W
- Area: 107 acres (43 ha)
- Built: 1882
- Architect: Great Sierra Consolidated Silver
- NRHP reference No.: 78000373
- Added to NRHP: August 25, 1978

The Great Sierra Wagon Road was a route through the Sierra Nevada in California, built to bring supplies to the Great Sierra Mine on Tioga Hill in the high country of what was to become Yosemite National Park. The road was built in 1882 by the Great Sierra Silver Mining Company, extending over 56.25 miles (90.53 km), in 130 days. The mine promptly shut down, leaving the road without a purpose. In 1915 the road was purchased by Stephen T. Mather, the independently wealthy first director of the National Park Service, who donated it to the Park Service. The Park Service opened the road to the public, calling it the Tioga Road. Designated California State Route 120, the road traverses the park from its west to east entrances.

The portion of the road that was listed on the National Register of Historic Places on August 25, 1978, is now known as the Old Tioga Road, left behind when the Tioga Road was realigned to avoid Aspen Valley in the western part of the park. The Old Tioga Road is a park service road, not open to the public apart from a short section that provides access to private inholdings. The road preserves stone retaining walls, known as "Chinese Walls" after the Chinese laborers who built them. The service road section remains largely unchanged from its original construction.
