= Rangers' Club =

- U.S. National Register of Historic Places
- U.S. National Historic Landmark
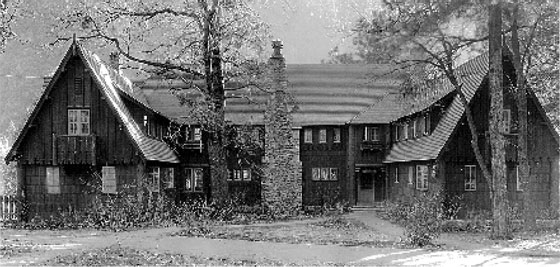

- Location within California Location within the United States
- Location: Yosemite National Park, California
- Coordinates: 37°44′50.17″N 119°35′12.42″W
- Built: 1920
- Architect: Charles K. Sumner
- NRHP reference No.: 87001414

Significant dates
- Added to NRHP: May 28, 1987
- Designated NHL: May 28, 1987

The Rangers' Club is a building in Yosemite Valley in Yosemite National Park that was donated by the independently wealthy first director of the National Park Service, Stephen Tyng Mather. He intended it to be used by the newly hired park rangers who were taking over from the departing army troops. He specifically intended it to blend into the natural environment. Its use of rustic stylings was part of a trend to the use of rustic design and natural materials in Park Service buildings until the 1940s.

== Concept ==
The Rangers' Club was designed by San Francisco architect Charles K. Sumner. Construction was completed in August 1924, at a cost to Mather of $39,380. The Rangers' Club was intended to foster a sense of esprit de corps among the newly created ranger service. Mather hoped that the example at Yosemite would encourage Congress to appropriate money to build similar facilities at other national parks, a vain hope. The Rangers' Club was the first significant structure on the north side of Yosemite Valley, part of a Mather strategy to relocate park services.

== Description ==
The Rangers' Club is a U-shaped wood-frame structure, 2 1/2 stories high, centering on a massive stone chimney in the center of the U. The interior is clad in redwood shingles, with board-and-batten siding on the gable ends. The building rests on a granite rubblestone foundation. Peeled log pilasters emphasize the corners of the frame building, originally extending through the roof. The gable ends feature balconies at the second floor, with jigsaw-pattern railings. The wood shingle roof is steeply pitched with shed roof dormers in the main section and steeply pitched gable dormers on the outer side of the flanking wings.

The interior arrangement has not been substantially altered. The first floor features a living room and dining room connected by a hallway, which itself features nooks furnished with bookshelf-partitions on its north and south sides, featuring decorative fir tree designs. Columns and beams are dressed and trimmed, with rough-hewn ceiling joists supporting diagonal ceiling sheathing. Downstairs interior spaces are finished in plaster with dark wood wainscoting. The building's original furnishings remain in the living and dining rooms. Upstairs a central hall runs to the ends of the wings, flanked by individual and dormitory rooms. The building's kitchen and bathrooms have been updated, and the partial basement contains mechanical equipment.

An adjoining L-shaped garage-woodshed and a transformer house are similarly designed, and complement the main building.

The Rangers' Club was declared a National Historic Landmark in 1987. The building was altered in 2008 to install new earthquake-resistant foundations and other seismic strengthening measures.
