= Briceburg, California =

Ghost town in Mariposa County, California

Briceburg
- Ghost town
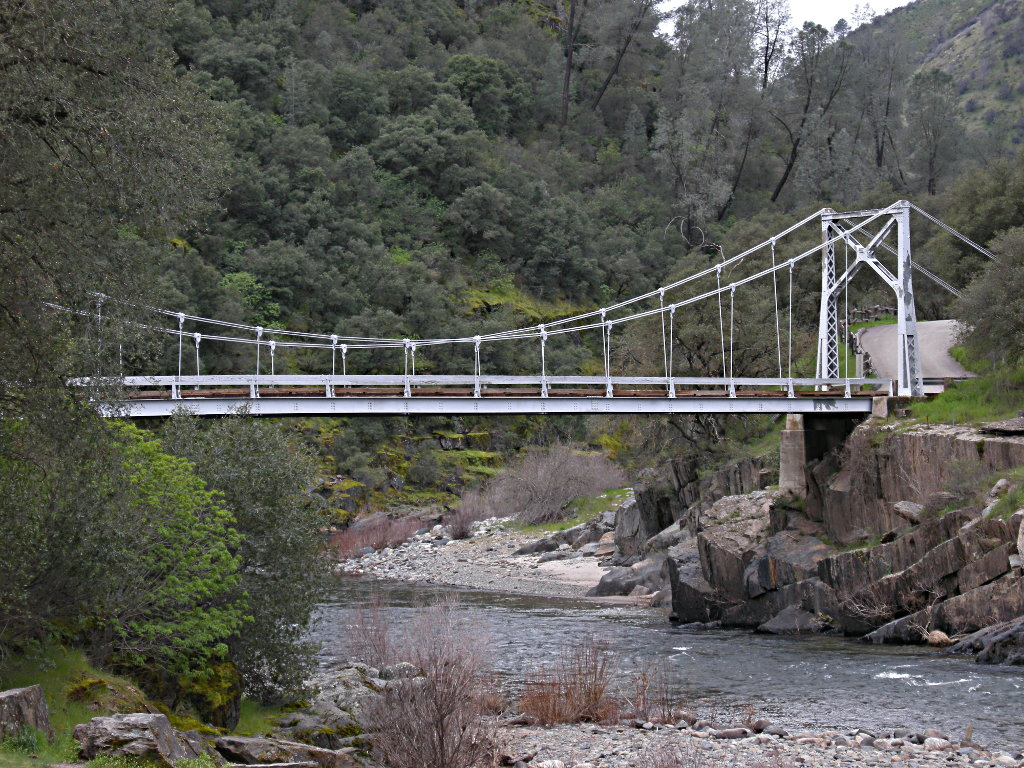
- Bridge over the Merced River at Briceburg

- Location in California
- Coordinates: 37°36′18″N 119°58′01″W
- Country: United States
- State: California
- County: Mariposa
- Named: 1926
- Elevation: 1,139 ft (347 m)
- GNIS feature ID: 1656298

Briceburg, formerly known as Bear Creek, is an unincorporated community in Mariposa County, California, United States, located along the Merced River near its confluence with Bear Creek, approximately 5 miles (8 km) north-northwest of Midpines. It is named for William M. Brice, who established a general store at the site in 1926.

== History ==
The area was originally known to settlers as Bear Creek. The Merced River canyon served as a route to Yosemite Valley from the 1850s, a period when gold mining took place along the river and its tributaries during the California Gold Rush.

Around 1924, a convict labor camp was established at the site, with 255 prisoners building 16.7 miles (26.9 km) of highway through the river canyon from Briceburg to El Portal, near the entrance to Yosemite. The camp was abandoned in 1926 when the All-Year Highway was completed, at which point William M. Brice moved his store to the south side of the river and the community took his name.

The suspension bridge connecting the community to California State Route 140 was completed in 1937. Built by 30 Civilian Conservation Corps enrollees under Forest Service engineer J. W. Nute, it spans 160 feet (49 m) across the Merced River. The bridge has been documented by the Historic American Engineering Record as HAER CA-1923.

=== 2019 fire and microgrid ===
The Briceburg fire of October 2019 burned 5,563 acres (2,251 ha) in the surrounding area. Following the fire, Pacific Gas & Electric installed a stand-alone power system consisting of solar panels, batteries, and a backup generator rather than rebuild traditional distribution lines through the high fire-risk terrain.

== Geography ==
Briceburg sits at an elevation of 1,139 feet (347 m) in the Merced River canyon. The community is accessed via a bridge over the Merced River connecting Highway 140 with Briceburg Road.

== Transportation ==
The Yosemite Valley Railroad operated through the Merced River canyon from 1907 to 1945, running 77 miles (124 km) from Merced to El Portal. Briceburg was a station on the line at milepost 60.8. The last scheduled train ran on August 24, 1945, after completion of the All-Year Highway had reduced passenger traffic, and the closure of both the Yosemite Sugar Pine Lumber Company and Yosemite Portland Cement Company had eliminated major freight customers. The former railroad grade now serves as a hiking trail and gravel road providing access to BLM campgrounds downstream.

California State Route 140, one of the principal routes leading to Yosemite National Park, passes through Briceburg. The Ferguson Slide of 2006 buried a section of the highway approximately 9 miles (14 km) east of Briceburg under roughly 798,000 tons of rock, closing the route for months.

== Recreation ==
The Bureau of Land Management operates the Merced River Recreation Area at Briceburg. The Briceburg Visitor Center, housed in a 1926 stone building that originally served as a general store, is open seasonally from late May through Labor Day. Three developed campgrounds—McCabe Flat, Willow Placer, and Railroad Flat—are located downstream along the former railroad grade.

The Merced River through Briceburg is part of the National Wild and Scenic Rivers System, designated in 1987 with a downstream extension added in 1992. The canyon is the only known habitat of the limestone salamander (Hydromantes brunus), a species endemic to the Merced River gorge. The river offers whitewater rafting, typically from April through early June during spring snowmelt.

== See also ==
- Bagby
- Clearing House
