= Bagby Stationhouse, Water Tanks and Turntable =

- U.S. National Register of Historic Places
- U.S. Historic district
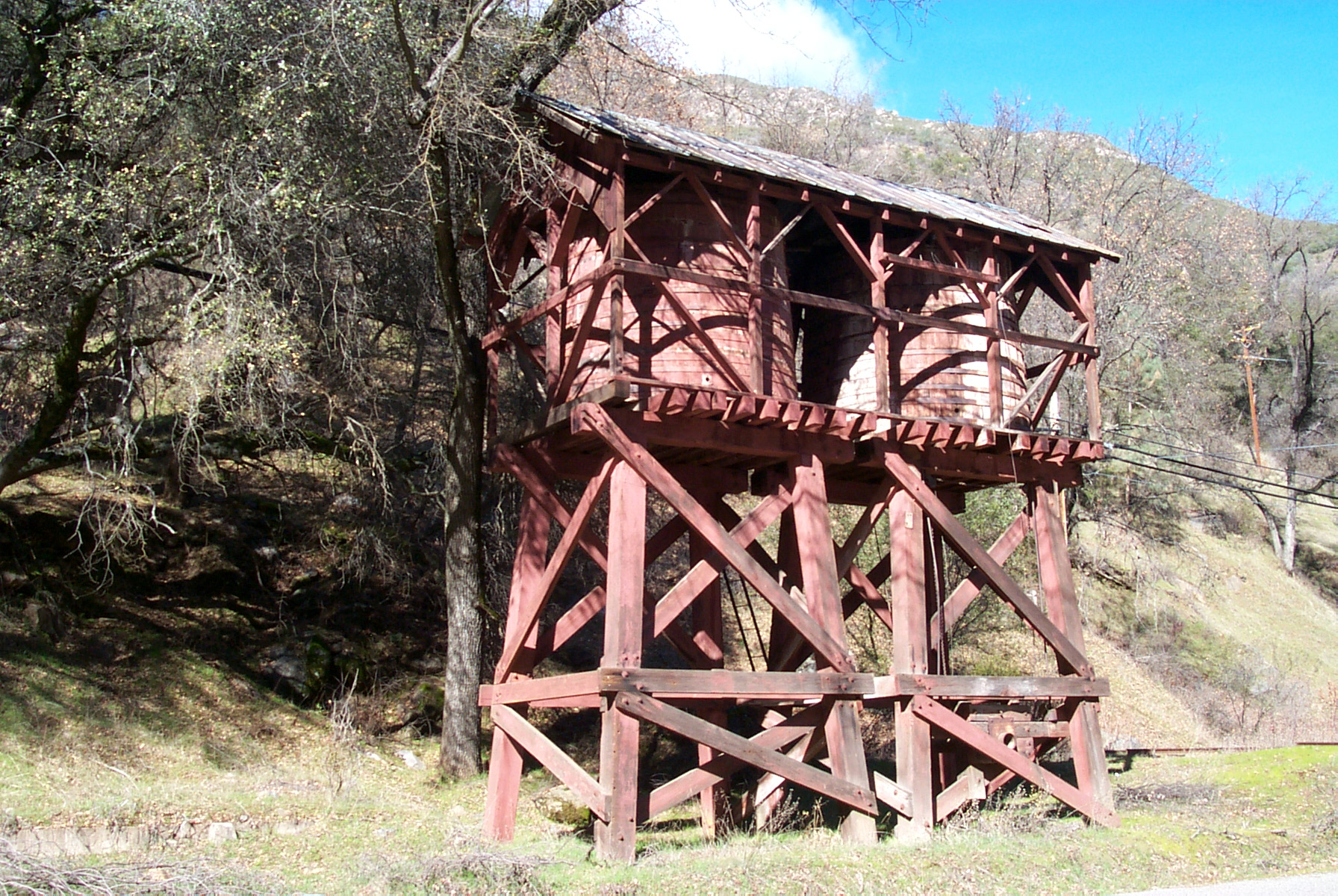
- Bagby water tanks

- Location within California Location within the United States
- Location: CA 140, El Portal, California
- Coordinates: 37°40′27″N 119°46′47″W
- Area: less than one acre
- Built: 1907
- Architect: Yosemite Valley Railroad
- Architectural style: Armstrong gallows frame
- NRHP reference No.: 79000316
- Added to NRHP: April 13, 1979

The Bagby Stationhouse, Water Tanks and Turntable are associated with the Yosemite Valley Railroad (YVRR), which ran from Merced, California to El Portal at the entrance to Yosemite National Park. The railroad operated from 1907 to 1945.

The structures now located at El Portal were built in Bagby, and were moved from that location in 1966 when the townsite was to be inundated by the filling of Lake McClure behind New Exchequer Dam.

== Stationhouse ==
Bagby Stationhouse is a rectangular wood-frame structure measuring 16 feet (4.9 m) by 40 feet (12 m). The two-story building was designed for a narrow site between the railroad tracks and the Merced River at Bagby. The hipped roof overhangs by 3 feet (0.91 m). The downstairs portion of the station comprises three rooms, a waiting room at one and a freight room at the other, separated by an office. The second floor was built as living accommodations for the stationmaster, with a living room, bedroom, kitchen, bath and enclosed porch. The station is now used by the Yosemite Conservancy.

== Water tanks ==
There are two water tanks at El Portal, salvaged from Bagby. The wood tanks stand on a timber structure and are 30 feet (9.1 m) high overall. A gabled standing seam metal roof runs over both tanks, whose wood sides are held with iron bands. The support framing is 12" x 12" timber.

== Turntable ==
The turntable was built at Bagby. It is reputed to be the last manually operated gallows-frame standard-gauge turntable left in the United States. The turntable was built of heavy timber, tied together with iron rods. The central gallows is a 16-foot (4.9 m) timber frame, with a king post truss composed of one-inch iron rods from the frame to the ends of the turntable.The turntable pivoted on wheels running on a single circular rail, 8 feet (2.4 m) in diameter.

The structures are located on National Park Service-owned property in El Portal, just outside Yosemite National Park proper, and are administered by the park. The ensemble was placed on the National Register of Historic Places on April 13, 1979.

== See also ==
- National Register of Historic Places listings in Yosemite National Park
- National Register of Historic Places listings in Mariposa County, California
