= Midpines, California =

Census-designated place in Mariposa County, California

Midpines
- Census-designated place
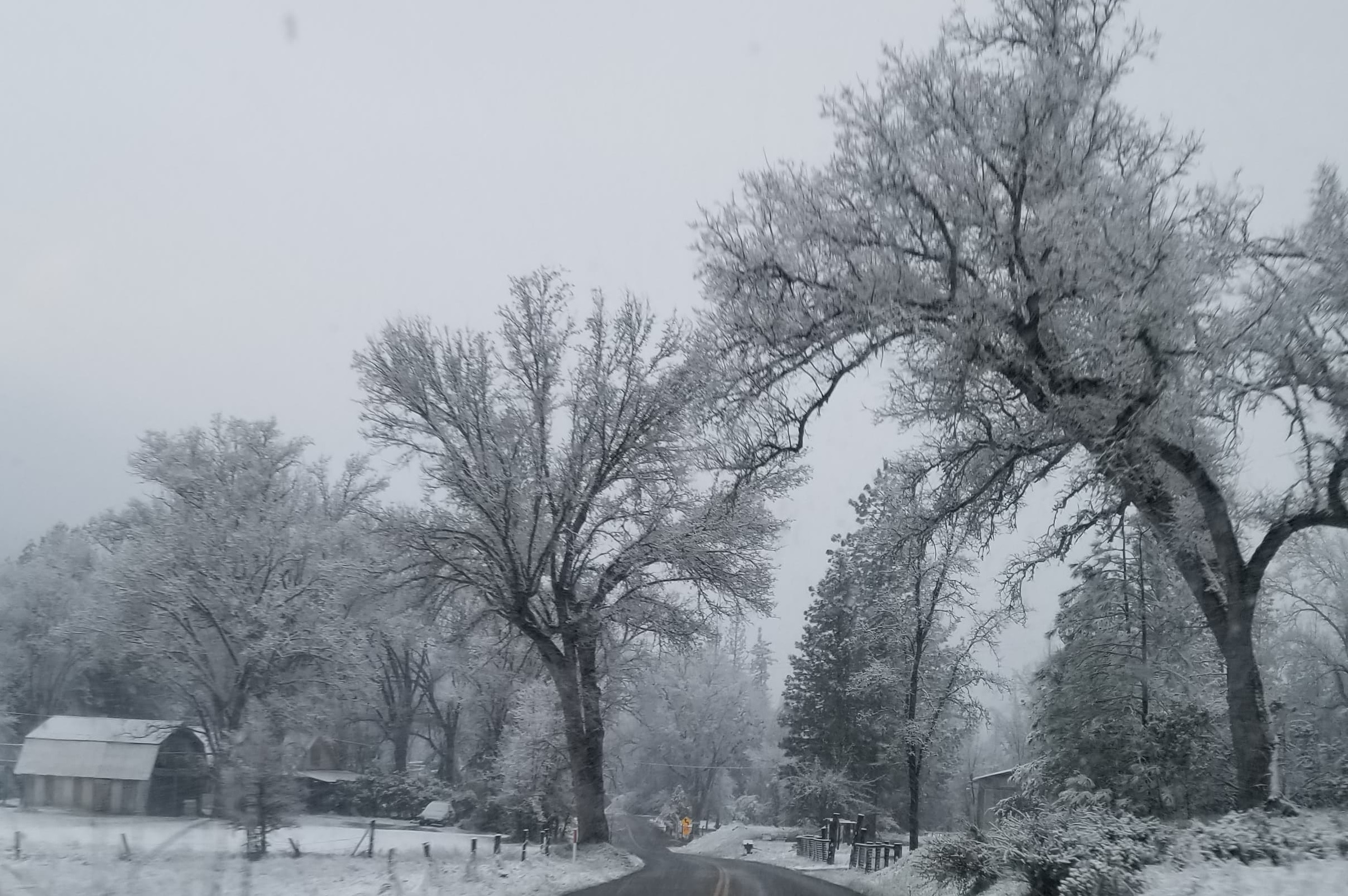
- Midpines in winter

- Location within California Location within the United States
- Coordinates: 37°33′08″N 119°55′44″W
- Country: United States
- State: California
- County: Mariposa

Area
  - Total: 4.362 sq mi (11.30 km^{2})
  - Land: 4.359 sq mi (11.29 km^{2})
  - Water: 0.03 sq mi (0.078 km^{2})
- Elevation: 2,687 ft (819 m)

Population (2020)
  - Total: 379
- Time zone: UTC-8 (Pacific)
  - Summer (DST): UTC-7 (PDT)
- ZIP Code: 95345
- GNIS feature ID: 2583080

Midpines is a census-designated place in Mariposa County, California, United States. It lies among the Sierra Nevada foothills of the central part of the state at an elevation of 2,687 feet (819 m), 5 miles (8 km) northeast of Mariposa, the county seat, and 22 miles (35 km) by road southwest of El Portal. It is composed of scattered residential areas along both sides of State Route 140, which is one of three principal routes to Yosemite National Park, some 30 miles (48 km) to the east of Midpines. The population was 379 at the 2020 census, down from 1,204 in 2010, when the CDP was drawn to cover significantly more area.

Midpines began as a resort, founded by Newell D. Chamberlain, in 1926. The first post office opened in 1929.

== History ==
=== Whitlock Mining District ===
Before its development as a resort community in the 1920s, the area surrounding Midpines was a productive gold mining region known as the Whitlock Mining District, situated approximately five miles north of Mariposa and east of the primary Mother Lode belt.

Placer mining began in the district shortly after the start of the California Gold Rush in 1849, with lode (hard rock) mining following soon after. Gold discovery in the district is credited to early prospectors including Lafayette Bunnell, Champlin Spencer, Thomas Whitlock, and John Sherlock. At its peak, the district hosted over 70 lode mines. Notable operations included the Buffalo, Champion, Colorado, Diltz, Golden Key, Landrum, Nutmeg, Schroeder, Spread Eagle, and Whitlock mines. The Whitlock Mine was a major operation, using a 20-stamp mill for ore processing.

The district supported several small settlements that are now ghost towns. The community of Colorado (often designated as Colorado Quartz) established a post office in 1858 that operated until 1901; the town of Whitlock maintained a post office from 1899 to 1910. Mining activity continued into the 20th century, highlighted by the 1932 discovery at the Diltz Mine of a 52-pound-Troy (24 kg) mass of specimen gold, which yielded over 43 pounds (20 kg) of refined gold.

In 2008, a historical marker dedicated to the Whitlock Mining District was placed by E Clampus Vitus (Matuca Chapter 1849) in front of the Midpines Country Store.

== Geography ==
Midpines is in central Mariposa County and according to the U.S. Census Bureau covers an area of 4.36 square miles (11.3 km^{2}), of which 0.03 square miles (0.08 km^{2}), or 0.69%, is water. The community is in the valley of Bear Creek, which flows northwest to join the Merced River at Briceburg.

== Demographics ==
Historical population
Census	Pop.	Note	%±
2010	1,204		—
2020	379		−68.5%
U.S. Decennial Census; 1850–1870 1880-1890; 1900 1910 1920; 1930 1940 1950; 1960 1970 1980; 1990 2000 2010

Midpines first appeared as a census-designated place in the 2010 United States census.

The 2020 United States census reported that Midpines had a population of 379. The population density was 86.9 inhabitants per square mile (33.6/km^{2}). The racial makeup of Midpines was 201 (53.0%) White, 1 (0.3%) African American, 32 (8.4%) Native American, 6 (1.6%) Asian, 0 (0.0%) Pacific Islander, 70 (18.5%) from other races, and 69 (18.2%) from two or more races. Hispanic or Latino of any race were 110 persons (29.0%).

The census reported that 375 people (98.9% of the population) lived in households, 4 (1.1%) lived in non-institutionalized group quarters, and no one was institutionalized.

There were 167 households, out of which 52 (31.1%) had children under the age of 18 living in them, 76 (45.5%) were married-couple households, 7 (4.2%) were cohabiting couple households, 36 (21.6%) had a female householder with no partner present, and 48 (28.7%) had a male householder with no partner present. Fifty-two households (31.1%) were one person, and 25 (15.0%) were one person aged 65 or older. The average household size was 2.25. There were 107 families (64.1% of all households).

The age distribution was 70 people (18.5%) under the age of 18, 16 people (4.2%) aged 18 to 24, 105 people (27.7%) aged 25 to 44, 119 people (31.4%) aged 45 to 64, and 69 people (18.2%) who were 65 years of age or older. The median age was 44.8 years. For every 100 females, there were 110.6 males.

There were 233 housing units at an average density of 53.5 units per square mile (20.7 units/km^{2}), of which 167 (71.7%) were occupied. Of these, 114 (68.3%) were owner-occupied, and 53 (31.7%) were occupied by renters.

== Bibliography ==
- Clark, William B. (1970). Gold Districts of California. Bulletin 193. California Division of Mines and Geology. OCLC 20442556.
- Salley, Harold E. (1977). California Post Offices, 1849–1976. La Mesa, Calif.: Rosa Publishing. ISBN 978-0960132416. OCLC 3514080.
