= Bagby, California =

Ghost town and former railroad hub in Mariposa County, California

Bagby
- Ghost town
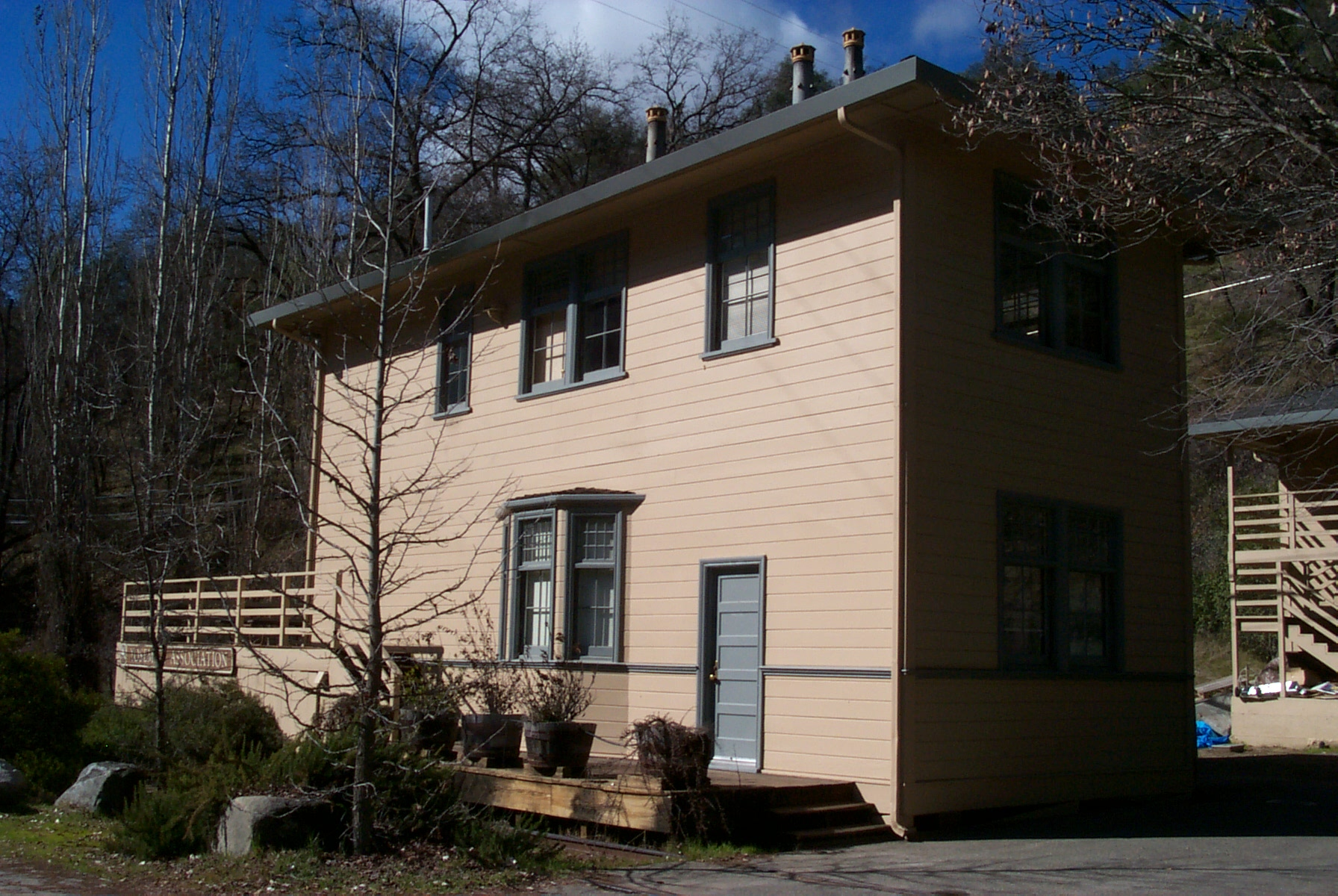
- The relocated Bagby stationhouse at El Portal

- Location in California
- Coordinates: 37°36′39″N 120°08′04″W
- Country: United States
- State: California
- County: Mariposa
- Founded: c. 1850
- Elevation: 827 ft (252 m)
- GNIS feature ID: 1658039

Bagby (formerly Ridley's Ferry and Benton Mills) is a ghost town in Mariposa County, California, on the Merced River. The site originated as a ferry crossing around 1850 and later became a stamp mill center and a stop on the Yosemite Valley Railroad (1907–1945). The townsite was submerged in 1967 when Lake McClure was expanded behind the New Exchequer Dam.

== History ==
=== Ridley's Ferry and Benton Mills ===
Thomas E. Ridley operated a ferry across the Merced River at the site beginning around 1850. In 1859, John C. Frémont built a dam across the river and a 48-stamp mill to process ore from his Mariposa Grant, naming the works Benton Mills after his father-in-law, Senator Thomas Hart Benton.

=== Post office and railroad ===
In 1897, an application for a post office under the name Benton Mills was rejected because Mono County held prior claim to the name. Applicant N. C. Ray chose "Bagby" after Benjamin Abner Bagby, a local businessman who operated a hotel, store, and saloon on the north bank of the river.

The Yosemite Valley Railroad, built from Merced between 1905 and 1907, passed through Bagby en route to El Portal at the entrance to Yosemite National Park. The station included water tanks and a turntable for servicing steam locomotives. The railroad ceased operations in August 1945.

=== Submergence ===
In 1966, the Bagby stationhouse, water tanks, and turntable were relocated to El Portal before the townsite was inundated. The structures—the only surviving Yosemite Valley Railroad station complex—were listed on the National Register of Historic Places in 1979 (NRHP #79000316). Construction of the New Exchequer Dam, completed in 1967, expanded Lake McClure and submerged the former townsite.

== Geography ==
The site lies near the crossing of California State Route 49 and the Merced River. The Bagby Recreation Area, managed by the Merced Irrigation District, provides access to the upper reach of the reservoir near the submerged townsite.

== See also ==
- Bear Valley
- Briceburg
- Bagby Stationhouse, Water Tanks and Turntable
- Lake McClure
- Yosemite Valley Railroad
- List of ghost towns in California
