= Hotel Del Portal =

Historic Hotel

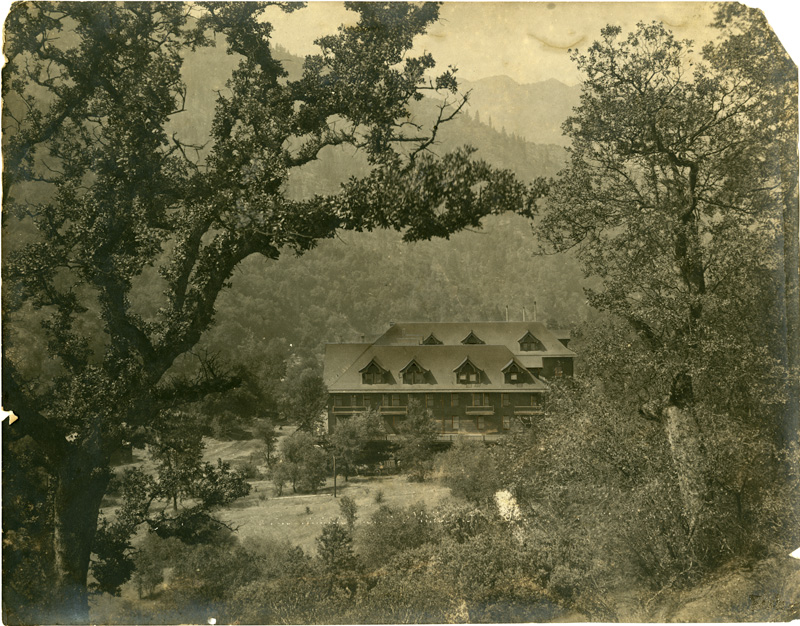
- Hotel Del Portal, El Portal California, by George Fiske.
- Interactive map of the Hotel Del Portal area

General information
- Location: El Portal, California, United States
- Coordinates: 37°40′29″N 119°47′03″W
- Opening: 1908
- Management: Yosemite Valley Railroad

Technical details
- Floor count: 4

Other information
- Number of rooms: 130

Hotel Del Portal was one of the early first-class hotels established by the Yosemite Valley Railroad to take passengers from Merced to the terminus at El Portal, California, just outside of Yosemite National Park. The hotel set the standard for elegance in the Yosemite area. When automobiles replaced horses and wagons for transportation to Yosemite, business at the Del Portal Hotel started to slow. A fire destroyed the hotel in 1917.

== History ==
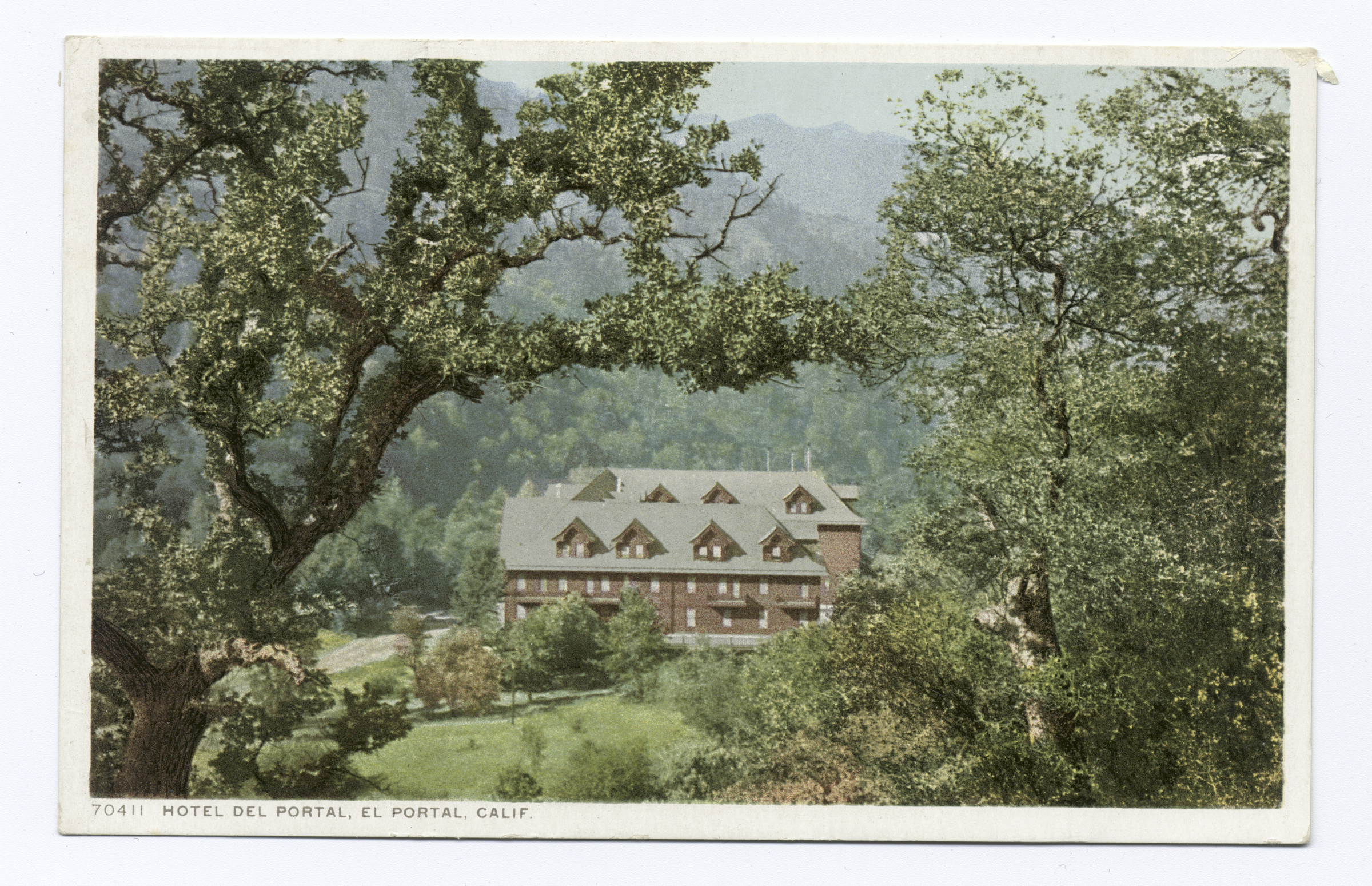
Hotel Del Portal, El Portal.

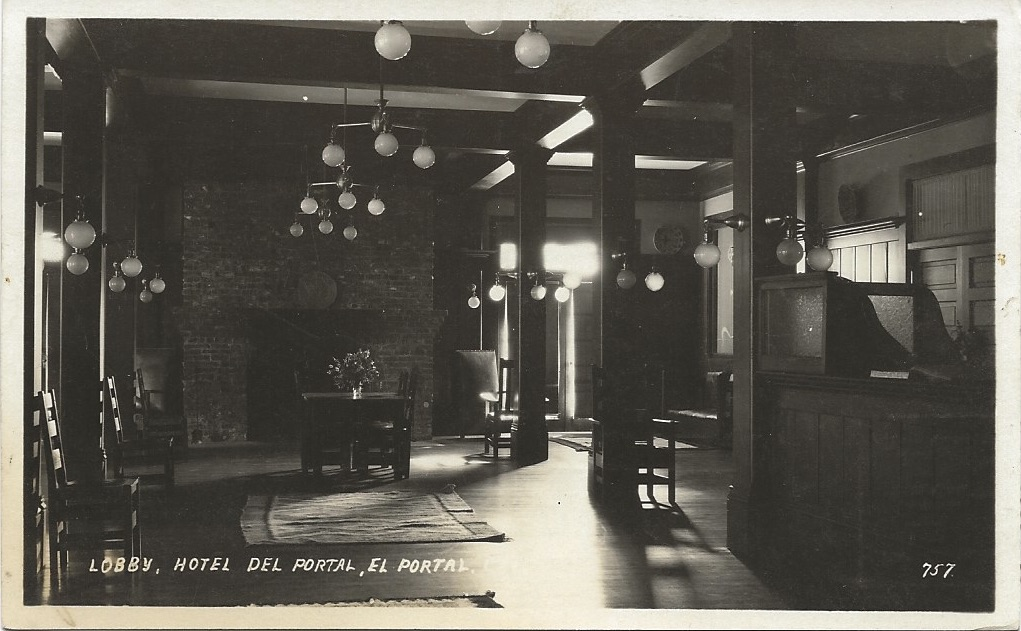
Interior lobby of the Hotel Del Portal, El Portal.

Work on a four-story Hotel Del Portal began in the fall of 1907 and completed in 1908 by a subsidiary corporation of the Yosemite Valley Railroad. It was located at El Portal, California in Mariposa County, 11.5 miles (19 km) west-southwest of Yosemite Village, at an elevation of 1,939 feet (591 m); on the western boundary of Yosemite National Park.

The hotel was a four-hour ride from Merced via a railway coach.

On October 1, 1917, the Desmond Park Service moved to the Hotel Del Portal during the winter. The hotel was owned by the Yosemite Valley Railroad company, but the Desmond Company leased and operated it and the automobile stage line between El Portal and Yosemite Valley. The Desmond Park Service Company changed its name to the Yosemite National Park Company in December 1917 and was reorganized in 1920.

On October 27, 1917, a fire destroyed the hotel including the Desmond Company's records. The fire was started by a defective attic flue.

In April 1918, the new El Portal Inn replaced the Hotel Del Portal. The smaller and less elegant Inn was a two-story, twenty-room hotel. It was operated by the Yosemite Terminal Company, a subsidiary of the Yosemite Valley Railroad. On July 9, 1932, the El Portal Inn was burned down due to defective kitchen equipment. A new hotel, next to highway 140, was built by December 1932.

== See also ==
- El Portal, California
- Yosemite National Park
