= Clearing House, California =

Unincorporated community in California, United States

Clearing House
- Unincorporated community
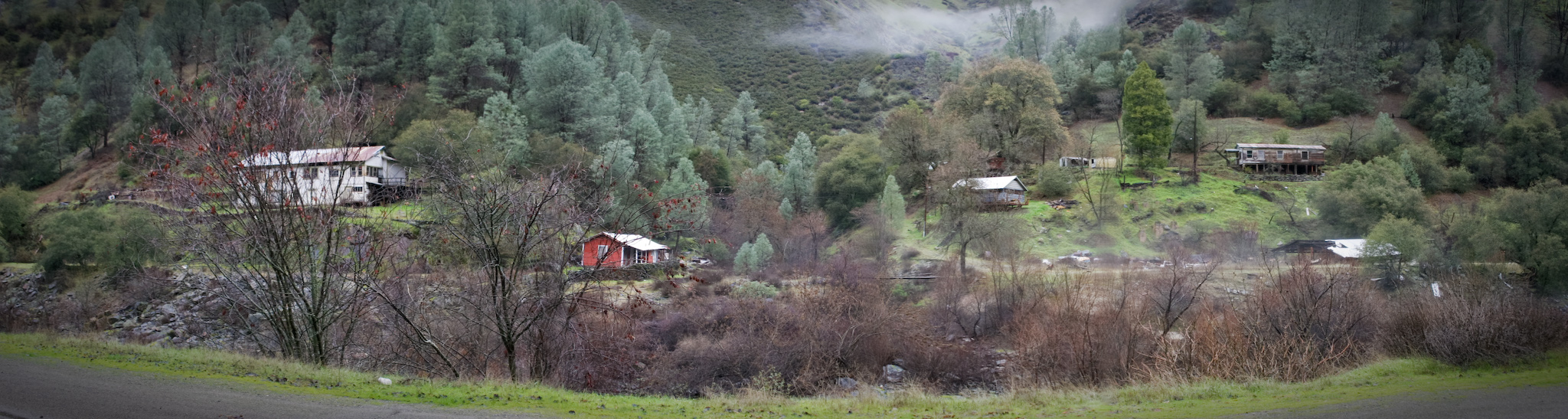
- Panoramic view of Clearing House from California State Route 140

- Location in California Clearing House (the United States)
- Coordinates: 37°39′54″N 119°52′03″W
- Country: United States
- State: California
- County: Mariposa
- Elevation: 1,555 ft (474 m)
- GNIS feature ID: 1655902

Clearing House (formerly Clearinghouse) is an unincorporated community in Mariposa County, California, United States. It is located on the north bank of the Merced River, 5 miles (8 km) west of El Portal.

The Clearinghouse post office operated from 1913 to 1933. The place name comes from the Clearinghouse Mine, so named as it was an exchange place for gold bullion and certificates during the Panic of 1907.

After the construction of the Yosemite Valley Railroad, Clearing House became a railroad stop. The mines continued to operate into the 1950s.
