= Yosemite Valley Railroad =

Former short-line railroad in central California (1907–1945)

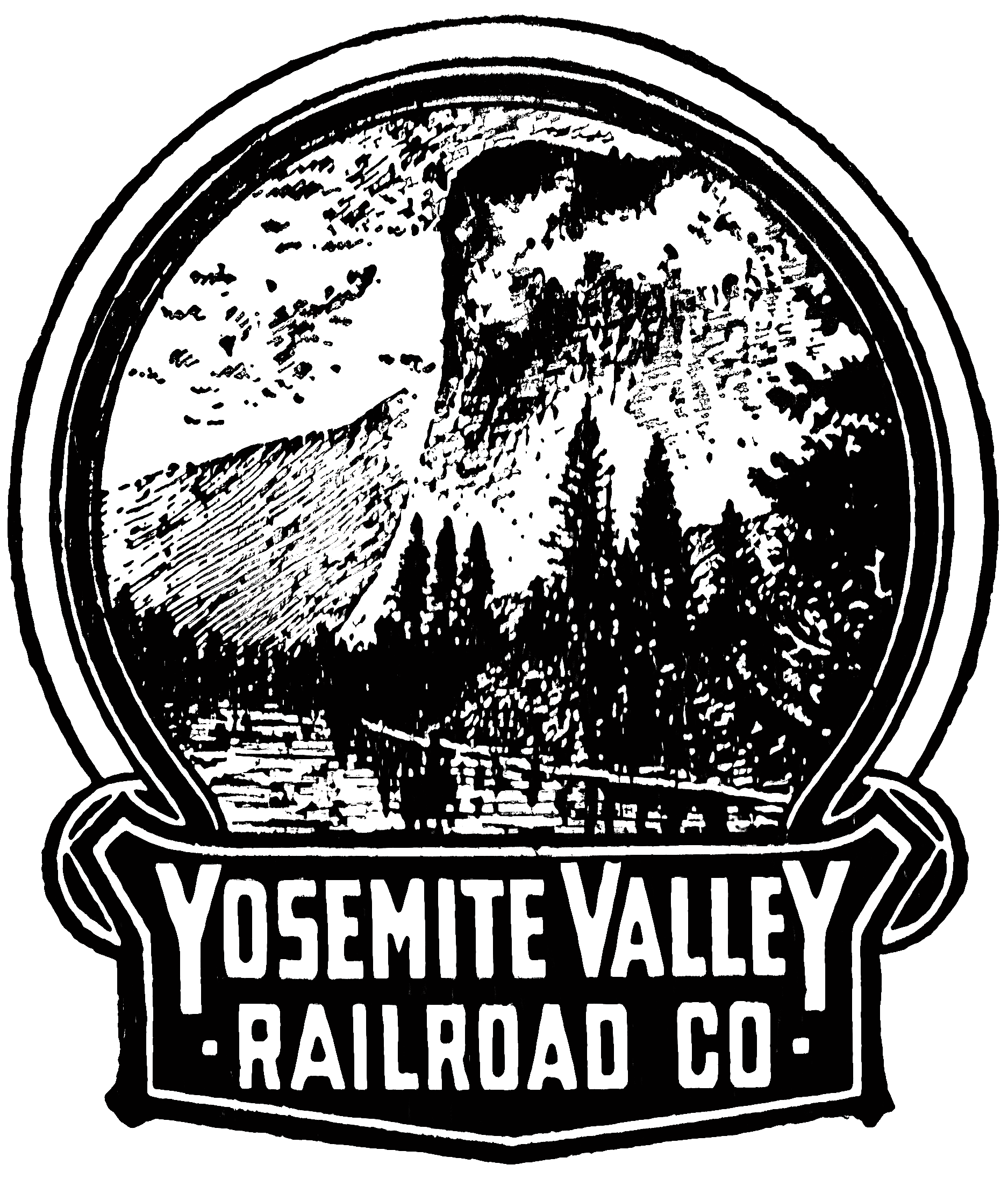

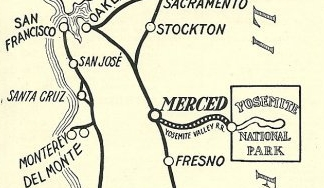
- Route of the Yosemite Valley Railroad

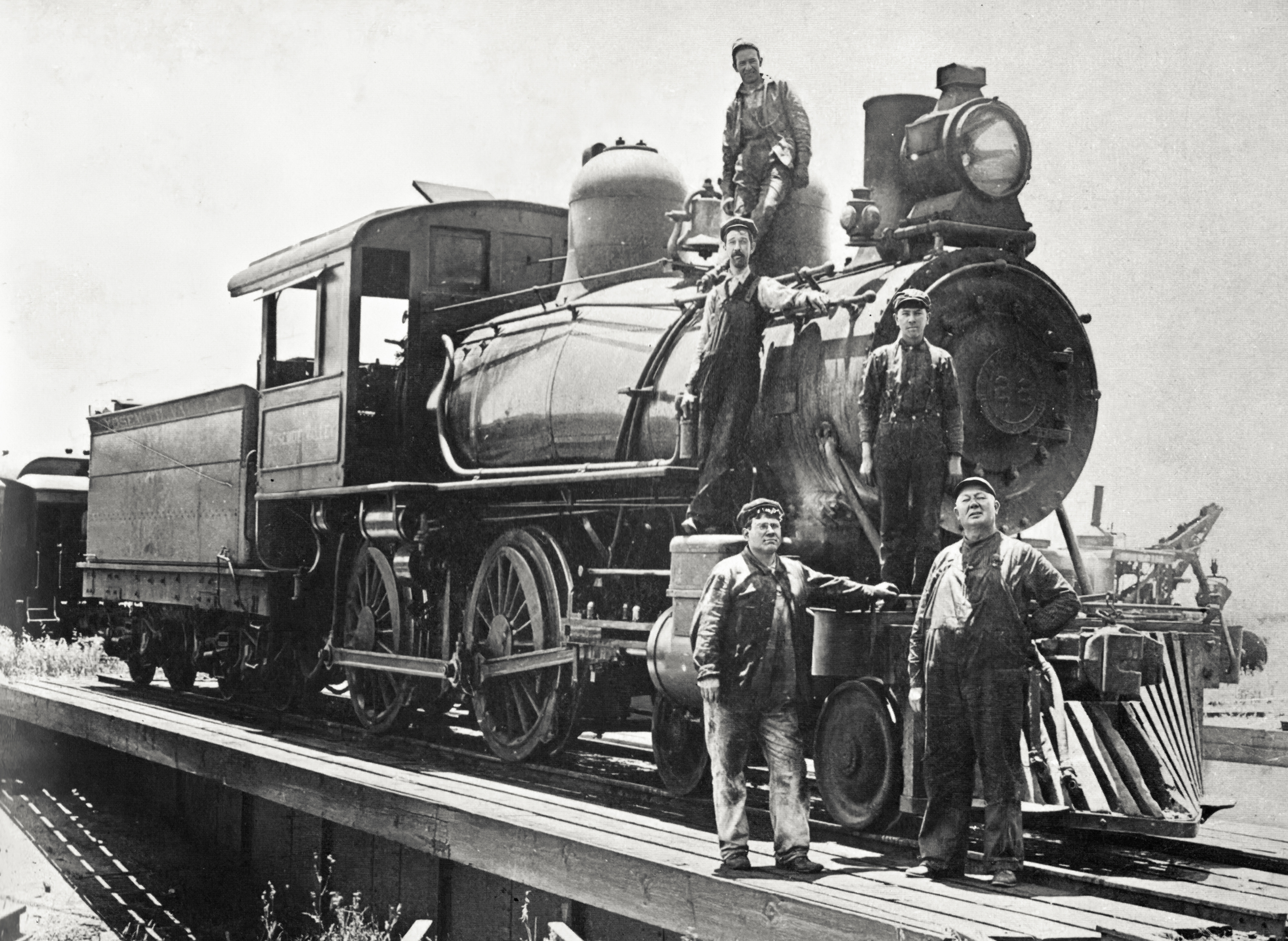
- Engine Number 22 on the Merced turntable

Overview
- Headquarters: Merced, California
- Locale: Merced River, California
- Dates of operation: 1902–1945

Technical
- Track gauge: 4 ft 8 1/2 in (1,435 mm) standard gauge
- Electrification: None
- Length: 80 miles (130 km)

Other
- Website: Yosemite Valley Railroad

The Yosemite Valley Railroad (YVRR) was a short-line railroad in Merced and Mariposa counties, California, that operated from 1907 to 1945. The railroad ran 78 miles (126 km) from Merced along the Merced River canyon to El Portal, on the western boundary of Yosemite National Park. Railroad construction was prohibited within the park, so passengers disembarked at El Portal and continued to Yosemite Valley by stagecoach or, after 1913, by motor stage. Overnight accommodations were available at the Hotel Del Portal until its destruction by fire in 1917.

The YVRR replaced the stagecoach routes that had served Yosemite-bound travelers since the mid-1870s. The railroad's opening in 1907 reduced through traffic on the Coulterville Road, which had been the primary tourist route to Yosemite via the historic mining town of Coulterville. By the 1920s, automobiles had begun to overtake the railroad in tourist volume. The completion of the All-Year Highway and the decline in recreational travel during World War II eliminated most remaining demand for rail passenger service.

In addition to passenger traffic, the YVRR served as a freight carrier, transporting logs for the Yosemite Lumber Company and limestone for the Yosemite Portland Cement Company. The closure of both operations in the early 1940s hastened the railroad's decline. The last regularly scheduled train ran on August 24, 1945. Some structures and rolling stock survive on display in El Portal, but little else remains.

Among its notable passengers, the YVRR carried two presidents: William Howard Taft in October 1909 and Franklin D. Roosevelt on July 15, 1938.

== Background ==
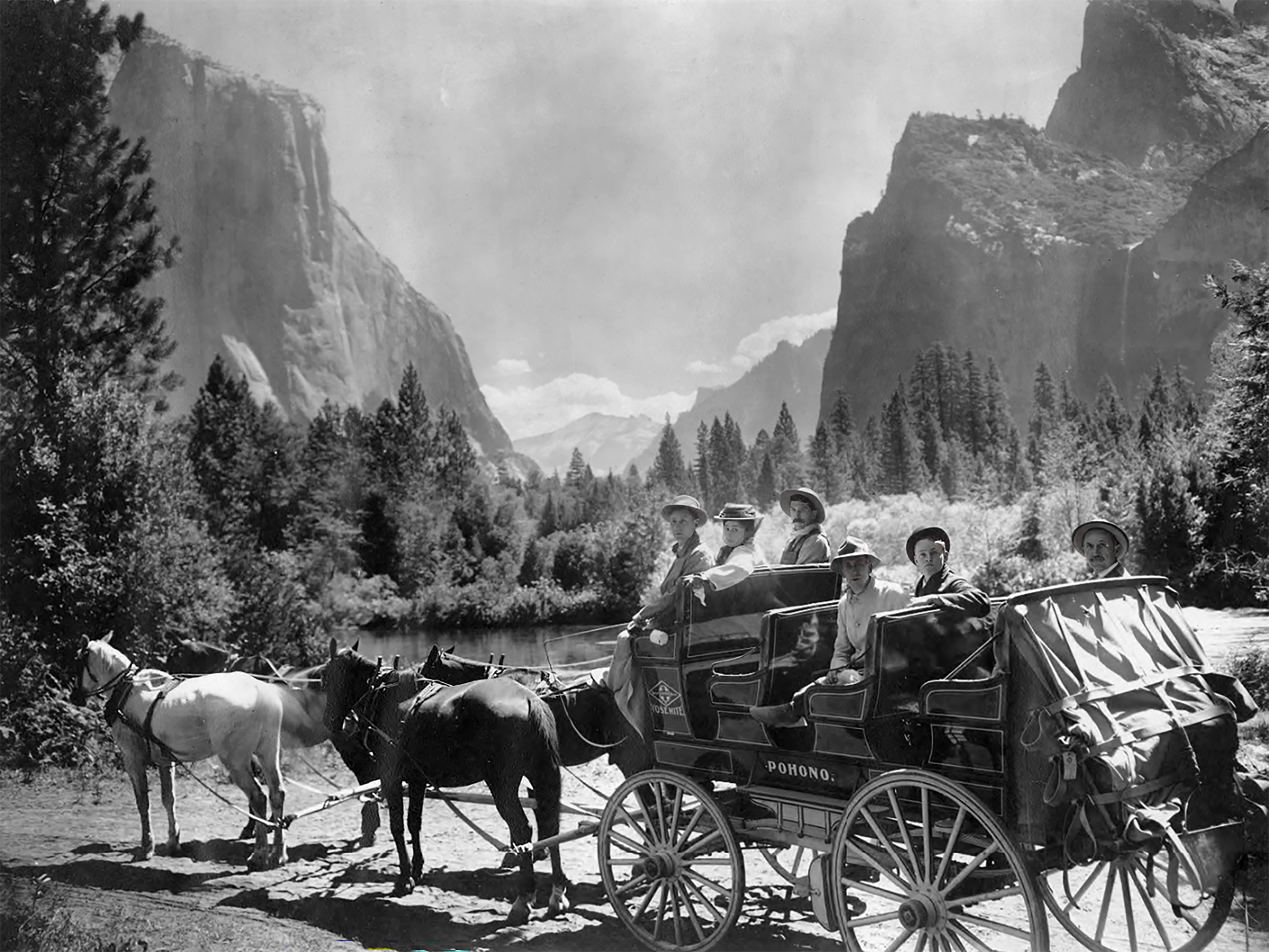
Yosemite stagecoach tour in 1900

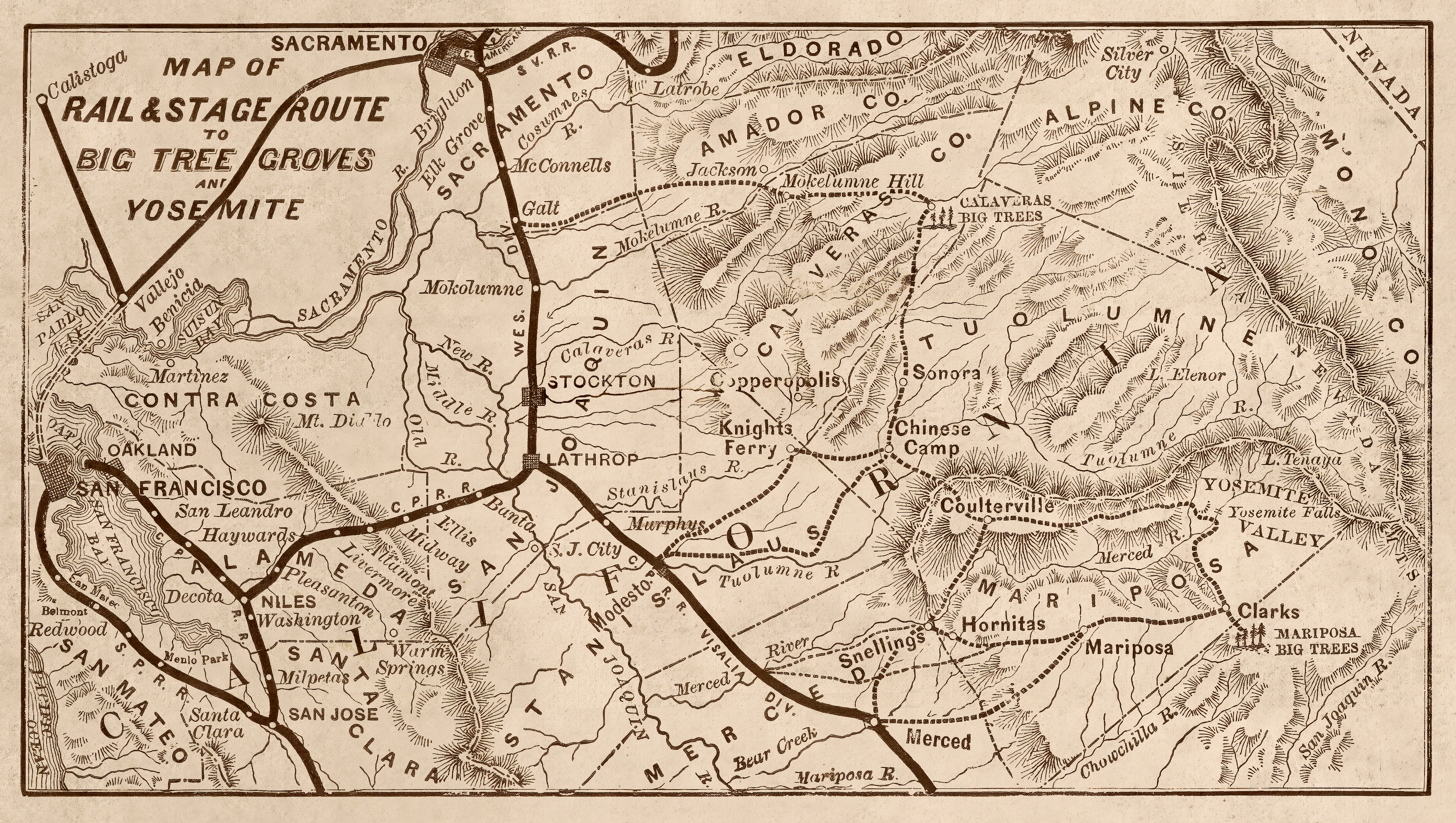
Stagecoach routes to Yosemite before the YVRR opened

Before the railroad's construction, the only access to Yosemite was a two-day stagecoach journey that was uncomfortable and carried the risk of robbery. The Southern Pacific's "Cannon-ball" stage from Raymond to Yosemite Valley was faster, completing the trip in twelve to fourteen hours, but the fare put it beyond the reach of most travelers.

== Origins ==
=== Right of way ===
The Yosemite Valley Railroad ran from Merced to El Portal, a distance of 78 miles (126 km), following the Merced River for much of its length. At Merced, connections were made with the Southern Pacific and Santa Fe railways.

Several companies had shown interest in building a rail line to Yosemite, but a group of Oakland and San Francisco financiers secured the right of way for the most practical route. The company hired Nathaniel C. Ray in 1902 as chief engineer. The northern boundary of Yosemite National Park then extended further north than its present location, and Congress prohibited railroads from entering any national park. After several legislative attempts to adjust the boundary, a bill passed in 1905 transferred certain lands from the park to the forest reserve, allowing the YVRR to obtain a permit to operate within the reserve in 1907.

=== Construction ===
Tracklaying began on November 1, 1905, with the arrival of the first ten carloads of rail. The company purchased two locomotives from the Northern Pacific Railway, a steam shovel, and a small narrow-gauge work engine. A labor shortage prompted the company to advertise for 1,000 workers at wages of $2.25 per day. The resulting rush caused overcrowding in Merced hotels and long lines at the employment office, prompting the company to post a sign: "Bus leaves for camp each morning at 7 AM. Everybody can have a job. Don't ask questions!" The workforce grew to about 1,500 men in January 1906, though turnover was high.

The railroad's first regularly scheduled train left the Santa Fe depot, six miles outside Merced, on December 18, 1905 — the third anniversary of the railroad's incorporation. The company was complying with its state charter, which required five miles of track to be in regular operation within three years. Tracks reached Merced Falls on March 4, 1906, and regular service began on May 25, 1906.

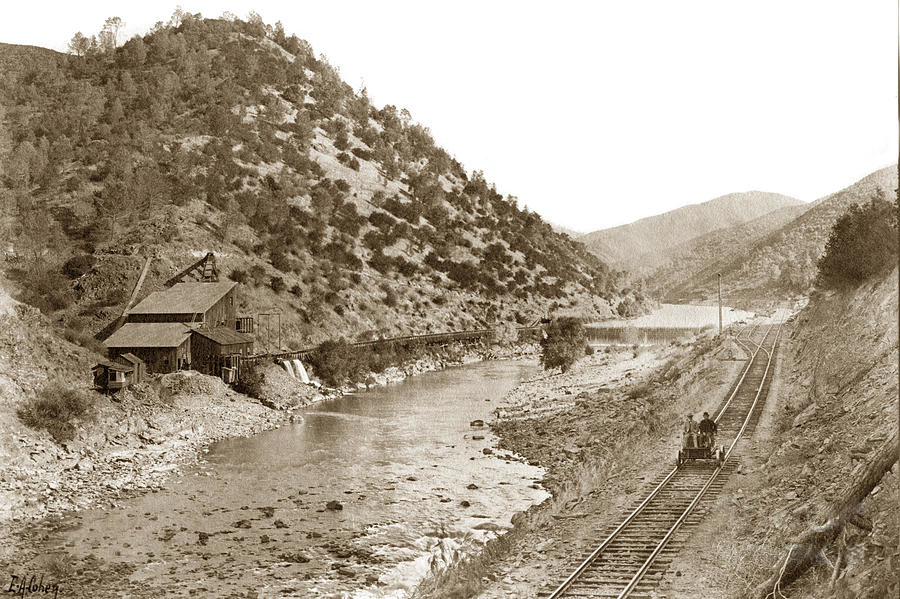
Railroad tracks at Clearing House, 72 miles from Merced

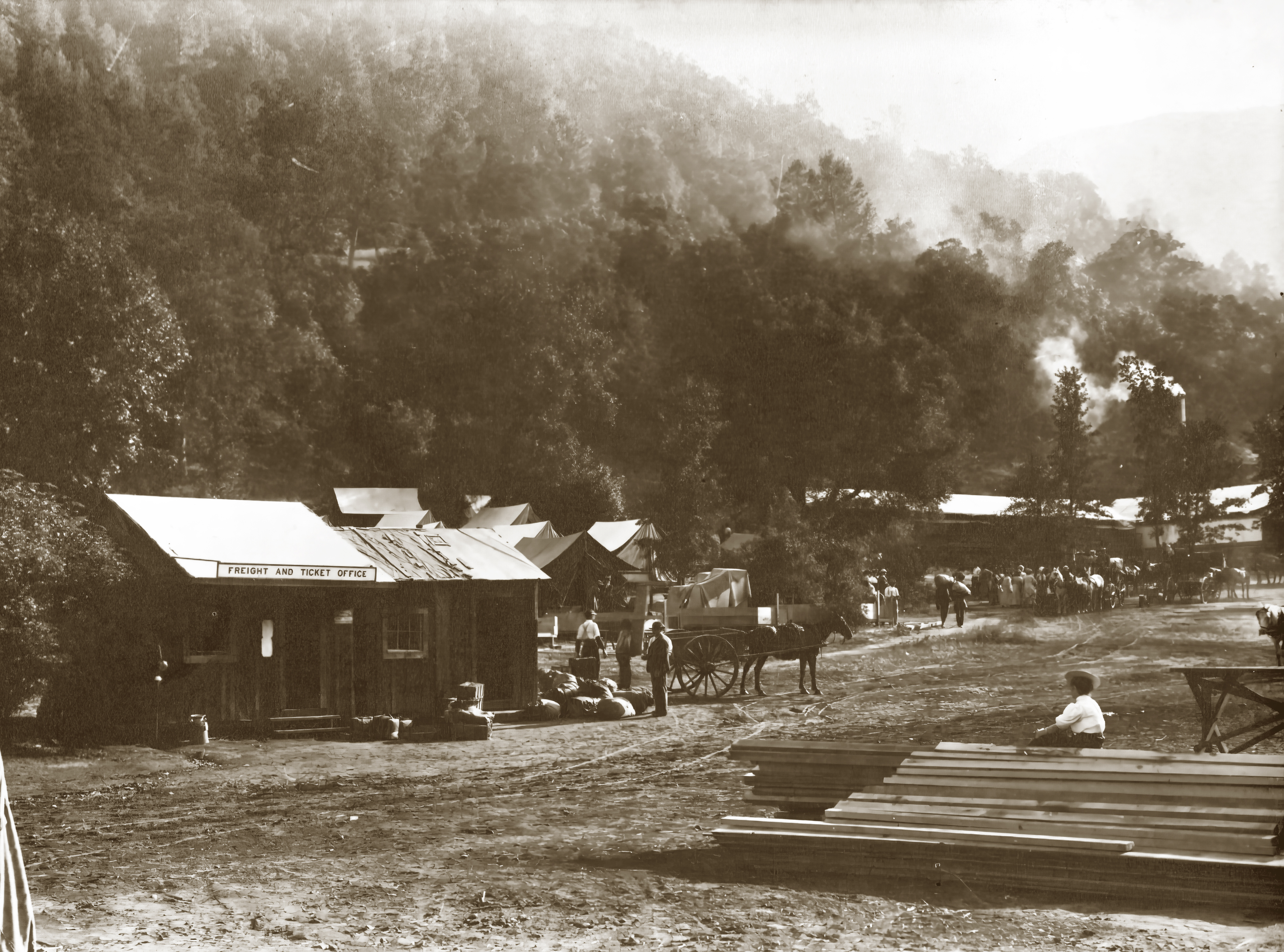
Temporary railroad station at El Portal under construction in June 1907

Construction to El Portal ran through rough foothill and mountain terrain. Supplies and equipment were transported by pack horses, ropes, sleds, two-wheeled horse carts, wheelbarrows, and drags. By May 1907, the rails had nearly reached the boundary of Yosemite National Park, but the government refused to grant further right of way into the valley. The railroad instead built a stagecoach road covering the six miles from El Portal to Yosemite Valley at a cost of $73,260.

The entire roadbed was blasted out of solid rock, requiring approximately 3,000,000 pounds (1,400,000 kg) of dynamite and powder and 285 miles (459 km) of fuse. Three Howe truss bridges crossed the canyon at Hopeton, Pleasant Valley, and Bagby, with 65 smaller bridges and trestles along the route. The completed line had 63.5 miles of grades and 32.9 miles of curves, with a maximum grade of 1–2%. The main line used Bessemer rail weighing 70 pounds per yard, and there were 505 curves and 10,265 miles of yards and sidings. A telephone and telegraph line was completed along the route on July 1, 1907, connecting Yosemite with the outside world.

=== First full-length run ===
On May 15, 1907, the YVRR's first full-length run departed Merced for El Portal with 12 passengers aboard. Through connections at Merced, tourists could reach Yosemite in less than a day from San Francisco (9 hours) or Los Angeles (16 hours).

The schedule allowed passengers to leave Merced at 2:00 p.m. and arrive at El Portal at 6:00 p.m. After dinner and an overnight stay at the tent hotel, passengers departed the next morning and arrived at the Sentinel Hotel before lunch. On the return trip, passengers reached El Portal in the afternoon, stayed overnight, and caught the morning train to Merced, connecting with northbound and southbound Southern Pacific and Santa Fe trains.

In 1907, the first year of operation, recreation visits to Yosemite National Park increased 30% to 7,102. By 1915, annual visits surpassed 30,000.

== Early operations ==
=== 1900s ===
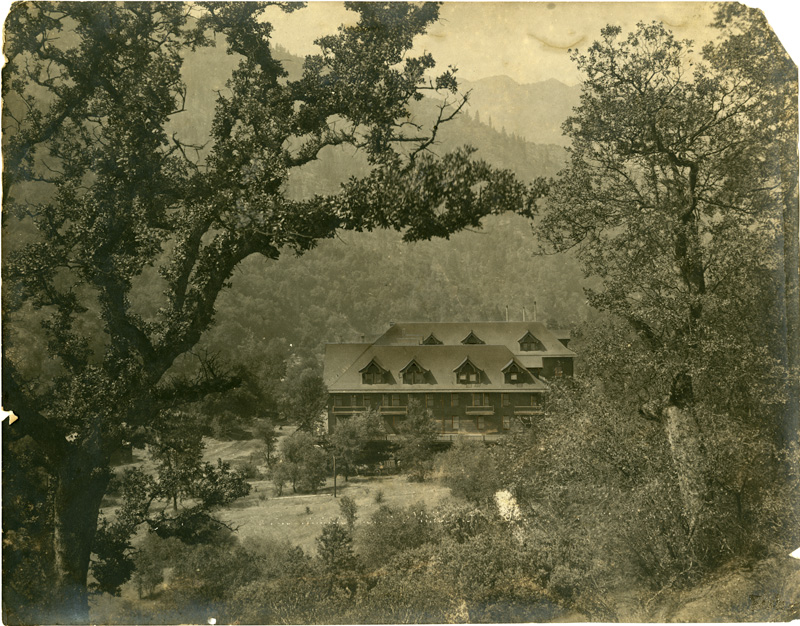
The Hotel Del Portal in 1909

The railroad found early success. Within two months of its first run, it had signed mail and express contracts, and freight revenue from mines and quarries was rising. The Southern Pacific abandoned its competing route and began advertising connections with the Yosemite run.

The railroad's headquarters were in the new Merced depot, which included a roundhouse. At the eastern terminus, the four-story Hotel Del Portal attracted prominent visitors, including Senator Benjamin Tillman, Governor James Gillett, William Randolph Hearst, J. B. Duke, and John Muir.

By late 1907, more than 50 people a day were making the trip. In December 1907, the railroad ran its first winter excursion, giving visitors year-round access to the park for the first time — decades before the All-Year Highway opened to automobile traffic. The railroad carried 23,089 passengers and reported a book profit of $73,000 in its first year of operation.

In 1909, the YVRR established Pullman service, which became one of the most heavily traveled routes by 1910. The railroad partnered with the Selig Polyscope Company to produce a travelogue about the Yosemite run that was screened internationally.

=== 1910s ===
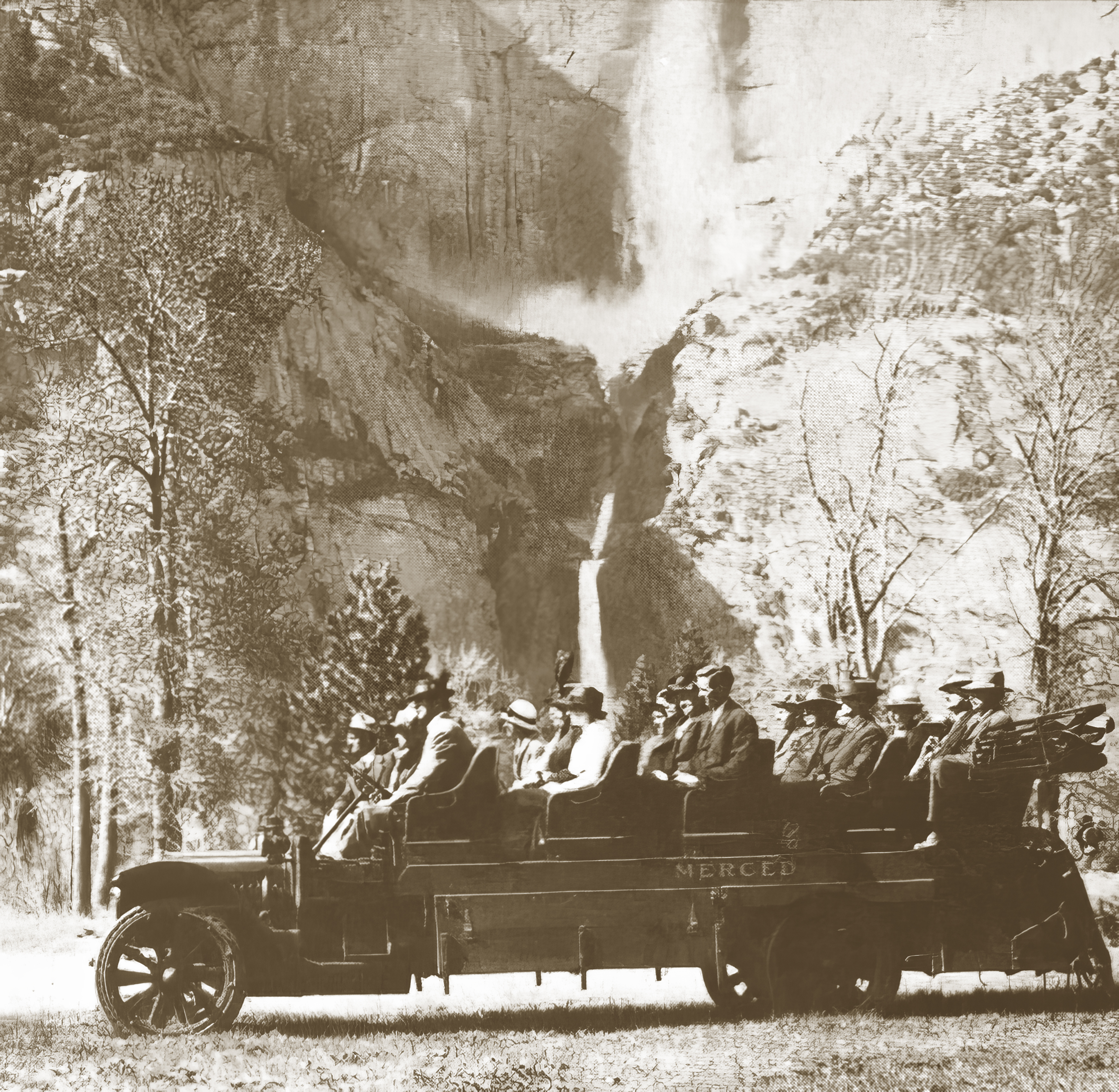
The first automobile stage arrived in Yosemite Valley in 1913

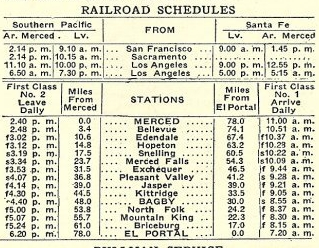
Railroad schedule for 1915–1916

In 1910, the Yosemite Lumber Company began operations, and the railroad transported logs from the mountains to the sawmill at Merced Falls. Standard-gauge flat cars with bulkheads were required for the steep incline grades. Log cars ran from the woods down the incline and along the main line to the mill without reloading, saving labor costs. The lumber traffic doubled the railroad's freight income from $64,000 to $128,000.

In November 1913, the first automobile stage replaced the horse-drawn stages on the 14-mile (23 km) route from El Portal to Yosemite Valley. The 25-passenger White Motor Company buses completed the trip in one hour and thirty-five minutes, compared with four hours by horse stage. By 1915, passenger and freight revenue continued to grow, and 80% of summer passengers were tourists from the Eastern United States.

In 1916, the YVRR leased the Hotel Del Portal and the stage line to the Desmond Park Service Company. The increased visitation enabled the Yosemite National Park concessionaire to expand its offerings, including construction of the Glacier Point Hotel in 1917.

A fire on October 27, 1917, destroyed the Hotel Del Portal, causing an estimated $100,000 in losses. The El Portal Inn, operated by a YVRR subsidiary, replaced it by the start of the next tourist season.

== "Grand Central of the West" ==
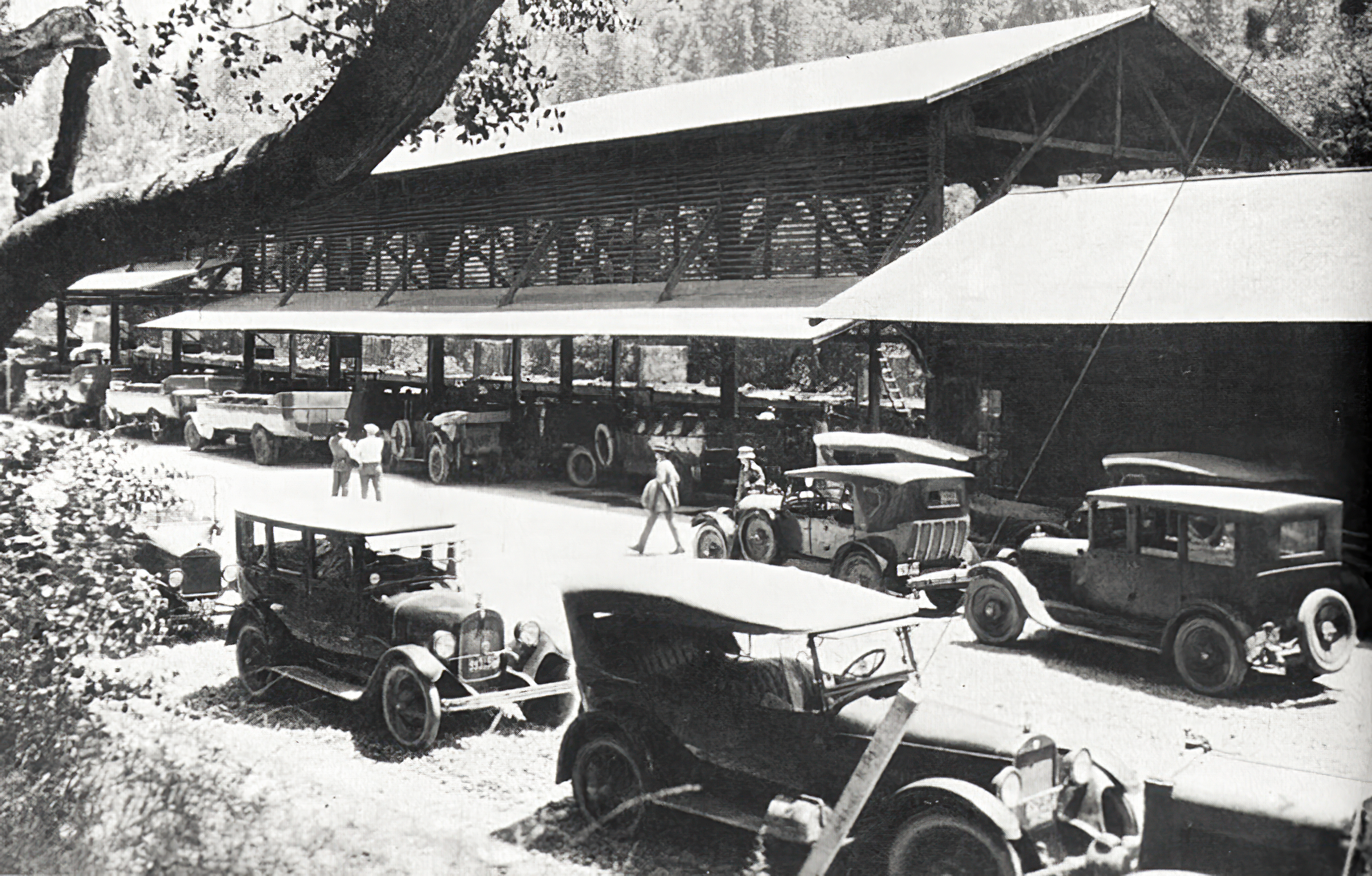
In the 1920s, White Motor Company vehicles lined up at the El Portal train shed to transport arriving tourists

After World War I, the YVRR earned the nickname "Grand Central of the West." Despite growing competition from buses and private automobiles, the railroad continued to attract visitors, including Prince Axel of Denmark and King Albert of Belgium, who traveled in private rail cars.

In 1921, Yosemite surpassed Yellowstone National Park in annual attendance by approximately 10,000 visitors. The railroad set records that year, carrying 2,000 passengers in a single day. Heavy Yosemite-bound specials and regular log trains to Merced Falls brought the payroll to 350 employees. In 1925, passenger travel reached an all-time high, with more than 85,000 paying riders.

To compete with the growing popularity of private automobiles, the YVRR offered auto-ferrying services, building platforms at Merced and El Portal to load cars onto flat cars. The service attracted wealthy passengers and Hollywood figures, including Buster Keaton, Roscoe Arbuckle, Mae West, Mary Pickford, and Douglas Fairbanks.

=== Exchequer Dam ===
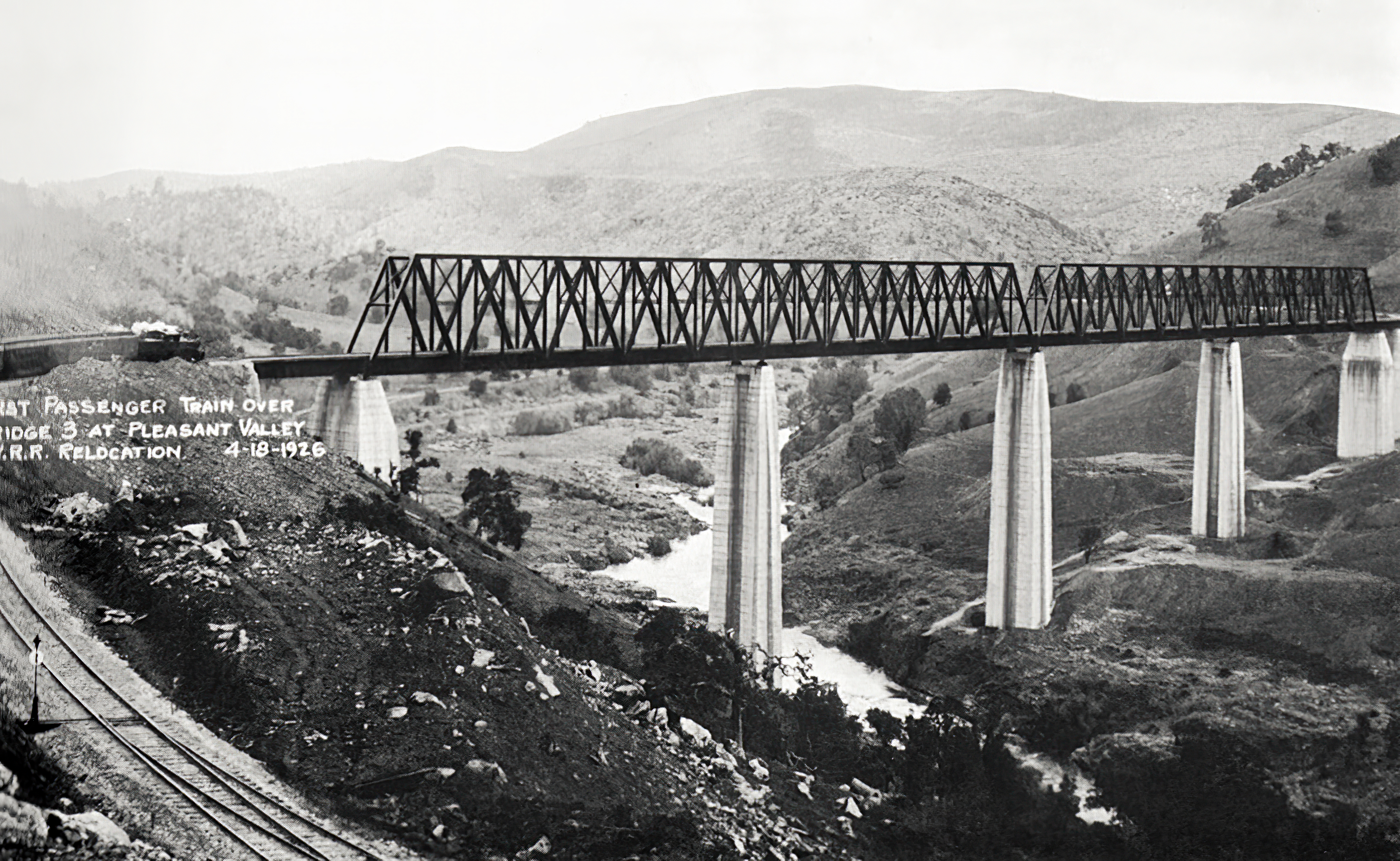
The first passenger train crossing the Barrett Bridge in April 1926

In 1922, the Merced Irrigation District decided to construct the Exchequer Dam on the Merced River. The project required relocating 16.7 miles (26.9 km) of the main rail route, from Merced Falls nearly to Bagby Station.

The relocation involved erecting five steel bridges and two trestles, including the 1,600-foot (490 m) Barrett Bridge spanning the reservoir. Costs exceeded estimates because of unstable rock conditions; the four tunnels on the new line required timbering for nearly their entire length, and bridge abutments used far more concrete than planned. The new line's first scheduled passenger train ran on April 18, 1926. A dedication ceremony for the dam was held on June 23, 1926, when President Coolidge pressed a button in the White House to set the powerhouse machinery in motion.

== Decline ==
The YVRR earned steady passenger revenue during its first two decades, but the completion of a modern highway in 1926 and the rising popularity of automobiles and buses caused a sharp decline in ridership. The Yosemite Lumber Company's suspension of operations in 1927 cut freight revenue by half.

=== Great Depression ===
The stock market crash of 1929 and the ensuing Great Depression worsened the railroad's finances, leading to bankruptcy in 1935. In a final effort, the YVRR was publicly offered for sale as a "real railroad as a Christmas gift" for five million dollars in newspapers throughout California.

The railroad was re-incorporated and showed a small gross profit between 1935 and 1937, aided by increased freight traffic from the reopened lumber mill. A flood then wiped out 30 miles (48 km) of track along the Merced River, and a fire in Merced destroyed the tool shed and several passenger cars. Rehabilitation loans from the Southern Pacific and the Santa Fe were required to restore operations.

In 1938, President Franklin D. Roosevelt rode the YVRR and toured Yosemite Valley, with a lunch stop at the Mariposa Grove. The railroad picked up Roosevelt's party from the Southern Pacific at Merced and pulled ten cars, including the president's private car, to El Portal using three freshly painted, decorated locomotives. By evening, the presidential party was on its way back to Merced.

=== Abandonment ===
In 1939, passenger travel nearly doubled as the country recovered from the Depression. Despite running 79 special trains and nearly reaching $100,000 in gross profit, revenue was insufficient to cover fixed costs. The sale of the Yosemite Lumber Company's timber rights to the federal government ended any prospect of refinancing. On October 25, 1944, the railroad applied to the Interstate Commerce Commission for permission to abandon operations. The last train ran on August 24, 1945. Dismantling was complete by the end of 1946; most locomotives and equipment were scrapped or sold.

== Legacy ==
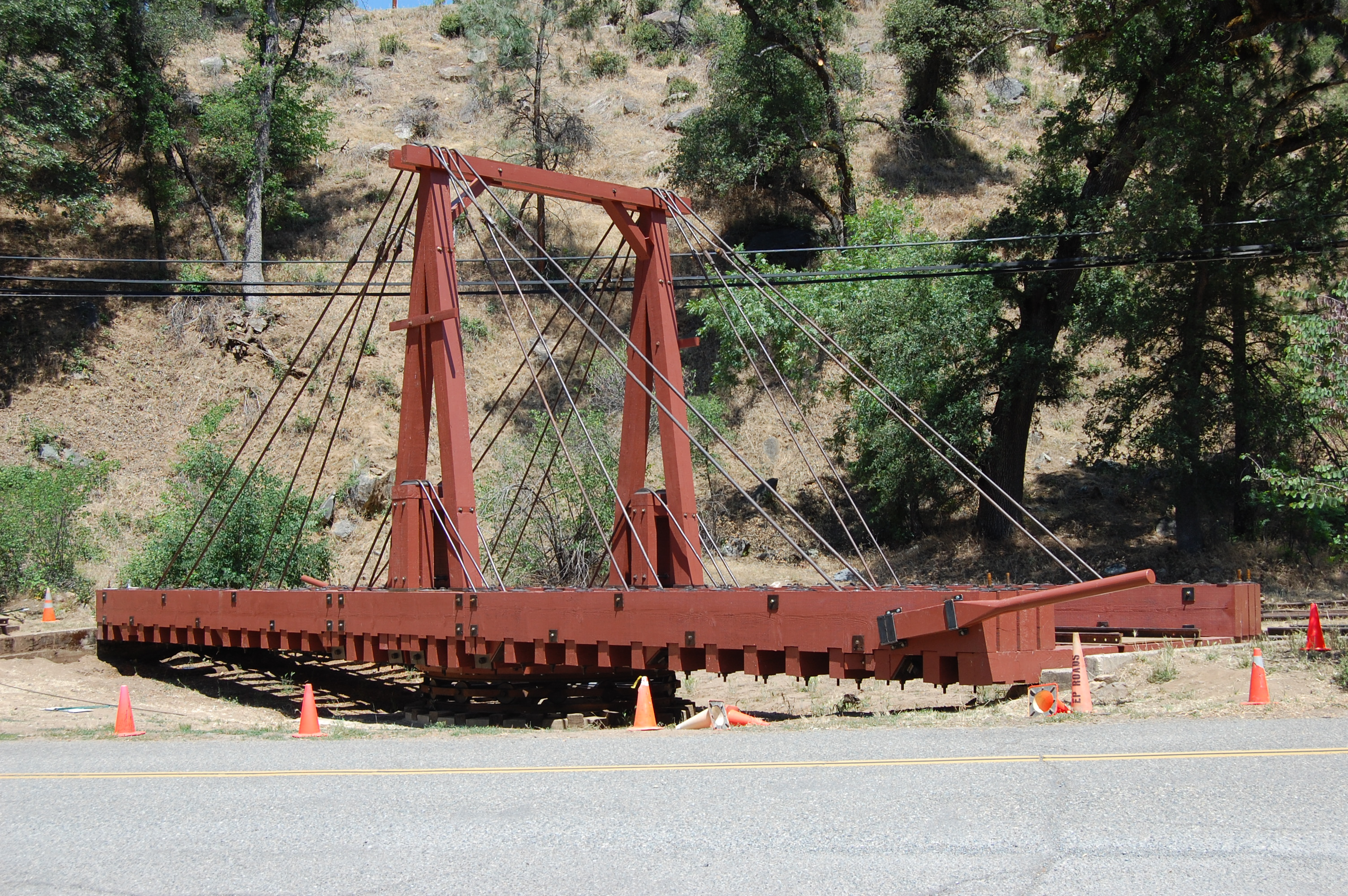
A replica of the original hand-powered "Armstrong" turntable at El Portal

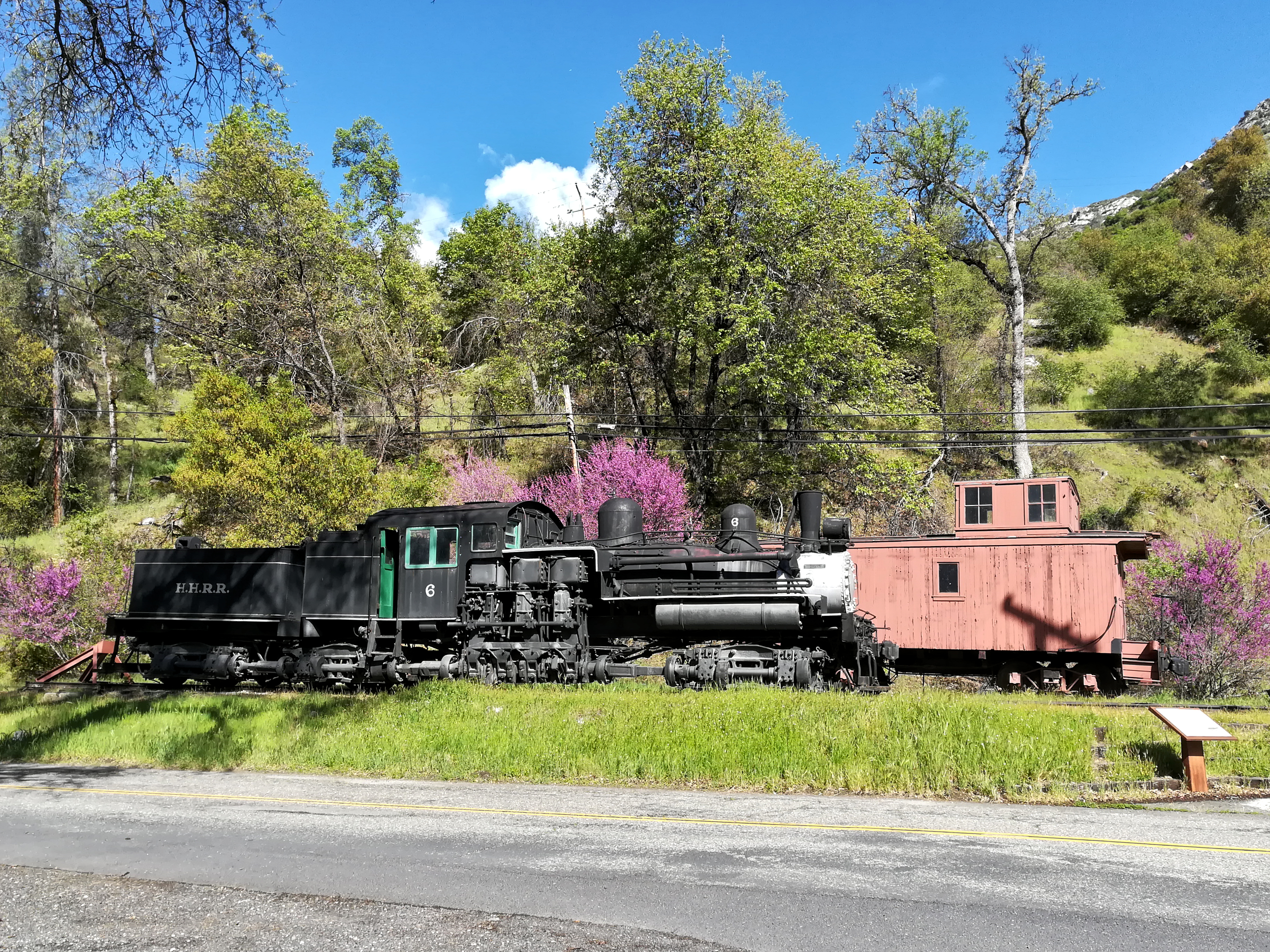
Caboose No. 15 with Hetch Hetchy RR Shay No. 6 in El Portal

The El Portal Inn, which had replaced the Hotel Del Portal as the railroad's terminus hotel, burned down in 1932. Some sections of the rerouted railbed were submerged when Exchequer Dam was expanded in the 1960s, though a few tunnels remain under Lake McClure and in Merced Canyon. The National Park Service relocated surviving structures, including the original hand-turned turntable, from Bagby to El Portal. Caboose No. 15, one of the few surviving pieces of rolling stock, is also on display there. Locomotive No. 29, sold to a Mexican railroad after the YVRR's closure, is on static display in Veracruz, Mexico.

The 1996 film Color of a Brisk and Leaping Day is based on the YVRR and a young man's attempt to save it from abandonment. The locations team revived the railroad on screen despite its 50-year dismantlement. The New York Times praised the film for its natural beauty and evocation of a vanished American past. It won the Cinematography Award at the 1996 Sundance Film Festival.

== Locomotive roster ==
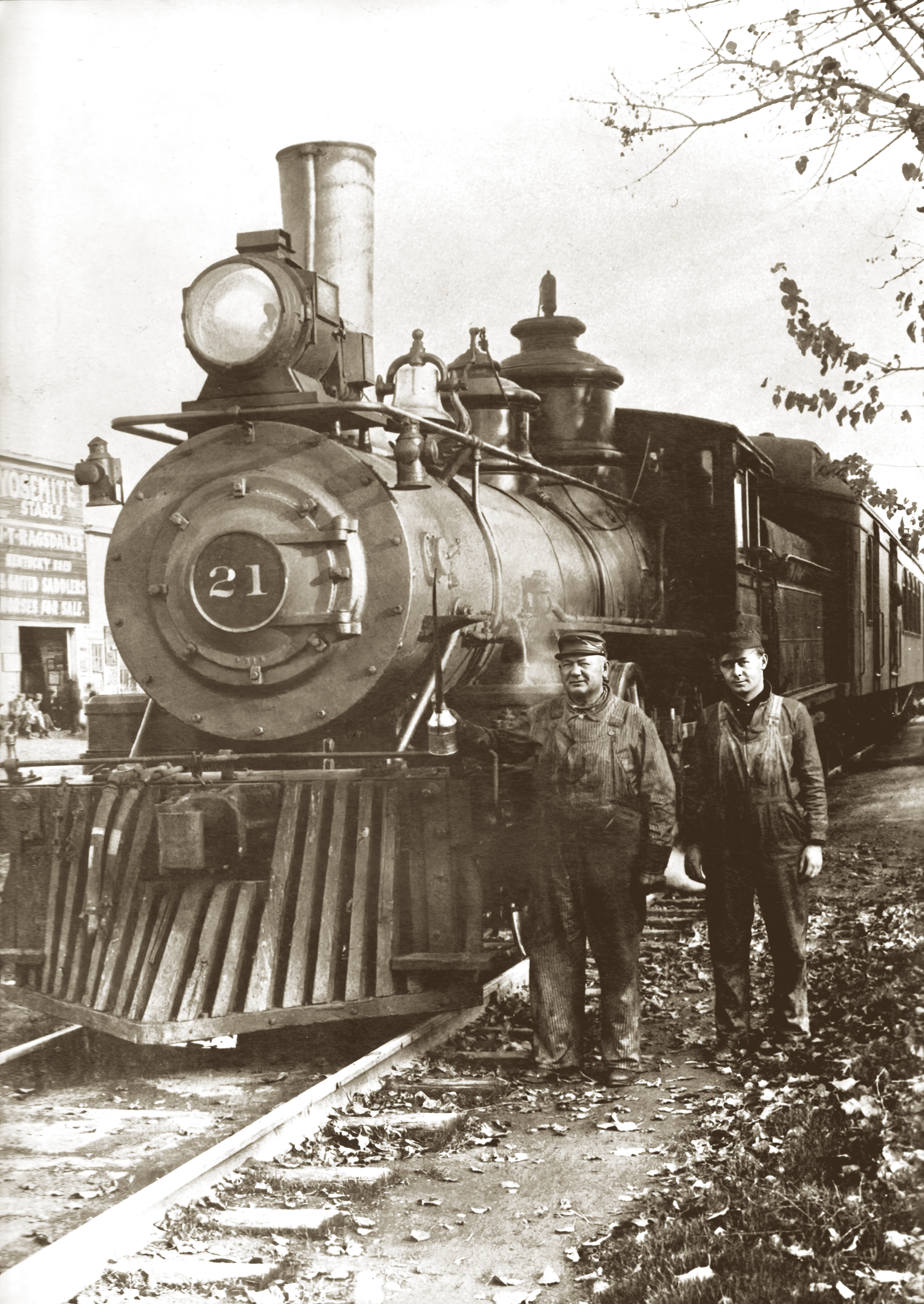
Charlie Grant and his son Jessie with Engine No. 21, one of the line's first locomotives

The YVRR operated ten locomotives during its 38 years of service. All were oil-burning, steam-powered Americans or Moguls, except for No. 11 (later renumbered 26), an unusual 2-8-0 with a sloping firebox. The first three engines were purchased secondhand and used in both construction and regular service. The remaining seven were purchased new from Alco or Baldwin and served until the railroad ceased operations. All engines originally had wooden cabs; most were later replaced with steel cabs, except for Nos. 11 and 20, which were sold before 1925.

No. 21 had a particularly long service history. Originally used for 25 years on the Wabash Railroad, it was sold to the YVRR in 1906. Engineer Charlie Grant, who had a special attachment to the locomotive, accompanied it to the Yosemite Valley Railroad, where he worked for 20 years before retiring in 1926. No. 21 continued to operate into the 1930s before being placed on standby, making it one of the longest-serving 4-4-0 locomotives in American railroading.

No.	Wheel arrangement	Builder	Tractive effort (lbf)	Notes
20	4-4-0	Baldwin, 1880	13,100	Originally Northern Pacific No. 32 (later 838). Purchased October 1905; numbered 1, then renumbered 20. Converted to oil; electric lights added. Sold 1923 to a firm in Mazatlán, Mexico; reported derelict on a beach in 1937.
21	4-4-0	Wabash, 1881	21,082	Formerly Wabash 129. Purchased 1906 for $6,248.40. Stationed at El Portal for emergency service in 1926; stood derelict there for several years. Retired 1932; scrapped at Merced in 1946.
22	4-4-0	Alco (Rogers), 1907	18,720	Purchased new for $13,589. Sold September 1945 to A. E. Perlman; scrapped at Port Chicago in 1948.
23	4-4-0	Alco, 1907	18,720	Purchased new for $14,735. Sold to Perlman; modified by the Modesto and Empire Traction Company for switching. Scrapped in the late 1940s.
25	2-6-0	Baldwin, 1925	28,600	Purchased new for $27,999.36. Leased to the Southern Pacific during World War II. Scrapped in the late 1940s.
26 (1st)	2-8-0	Altoona, 1879	21,082	Originally Pennsylvania Railroad No. 772; later Bayfield and Western No. 4, then Northern Pacific No. 4. Acquired October 1905 as No. 11; renumbered 26 in 1906. Sold June 1917 to Willette and Burr. Stored in a shed near Niles in 1937; scrapped 1941.
26 (2nd)	2-6-0	Alco, 1924	28,600	Purchased new for $30,884. Leased to the Southern Pacific during World War II. Scrapped in the late 1940s.
27	2-6-0	Baldwin, 1913	28,600	Purchased new for $17,340.18. Scrapped 1948.
28	2-6-0	Baldwin, 1917	28,600	Purchased new for $19,851. Wrecked July 1920; rebuilt. Scrapped in the late 1940s.
29	2-6-0	Baldwin, 1922	28,600	Sold to Ferrocarriles Unidos de Yucatán as No. 353. On static display in Veracruz; the only surviving YVRR locomotive.

Yosemite Valley Railroad locomotives

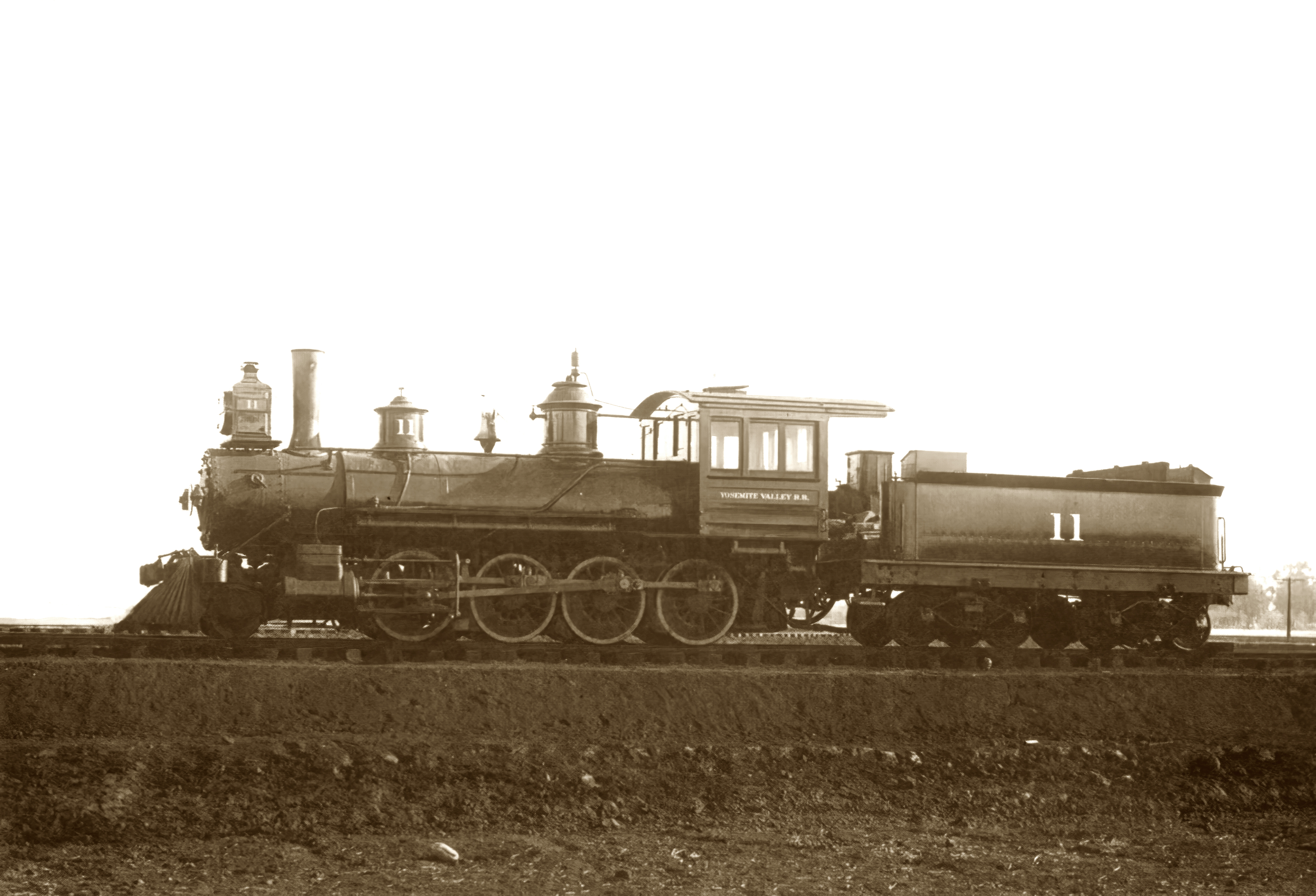
Engine 11

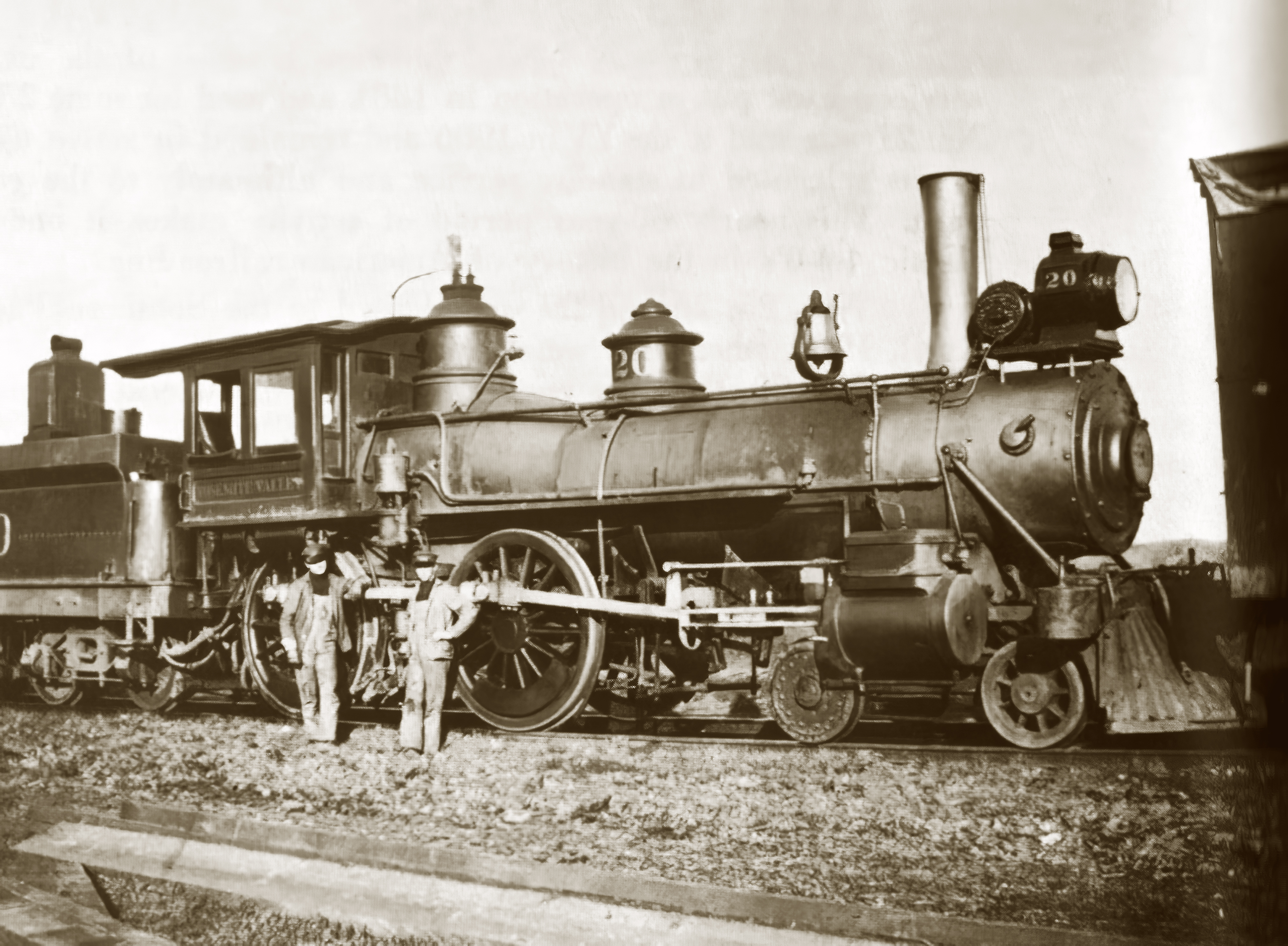
Engine 20

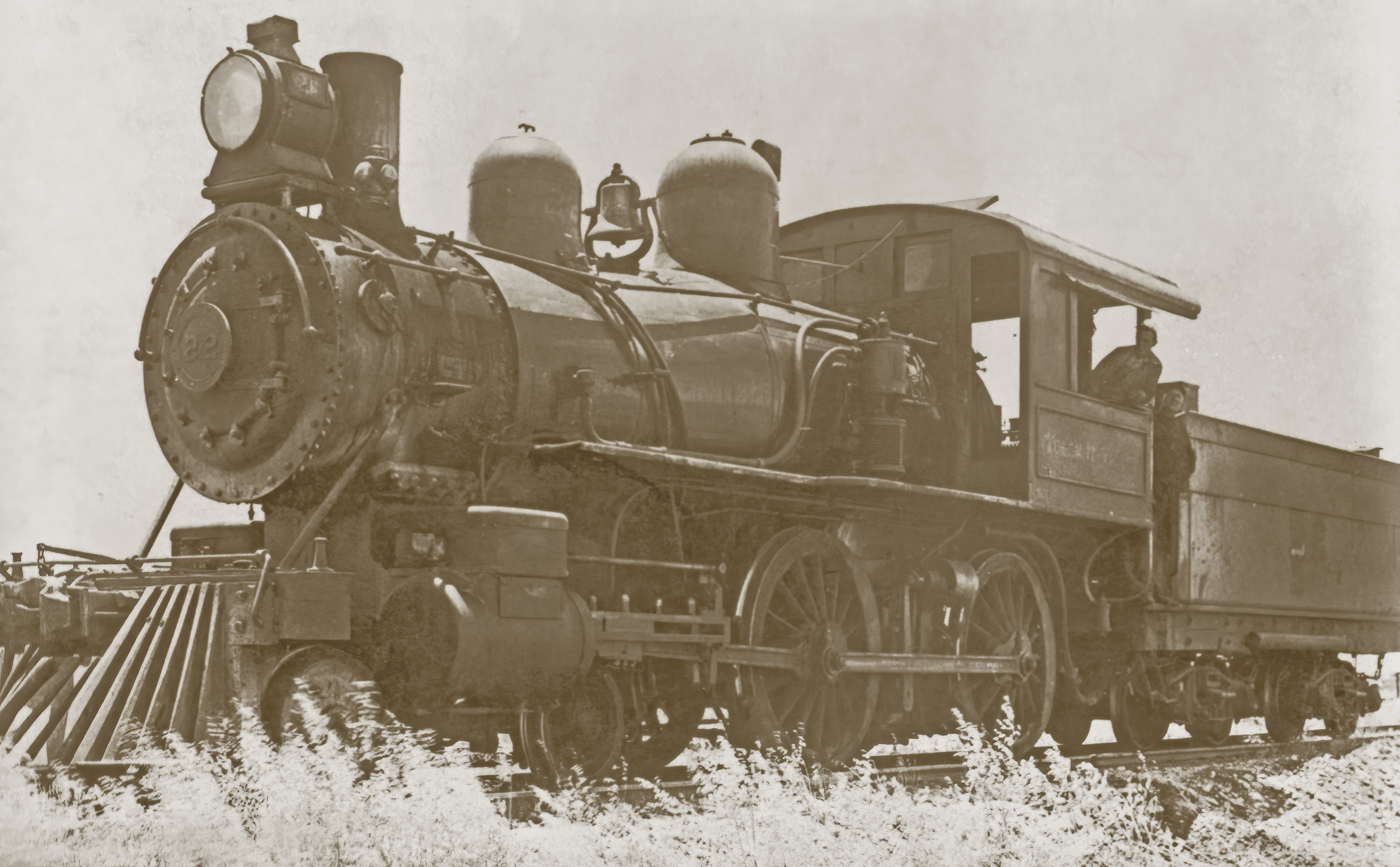
Engine 22

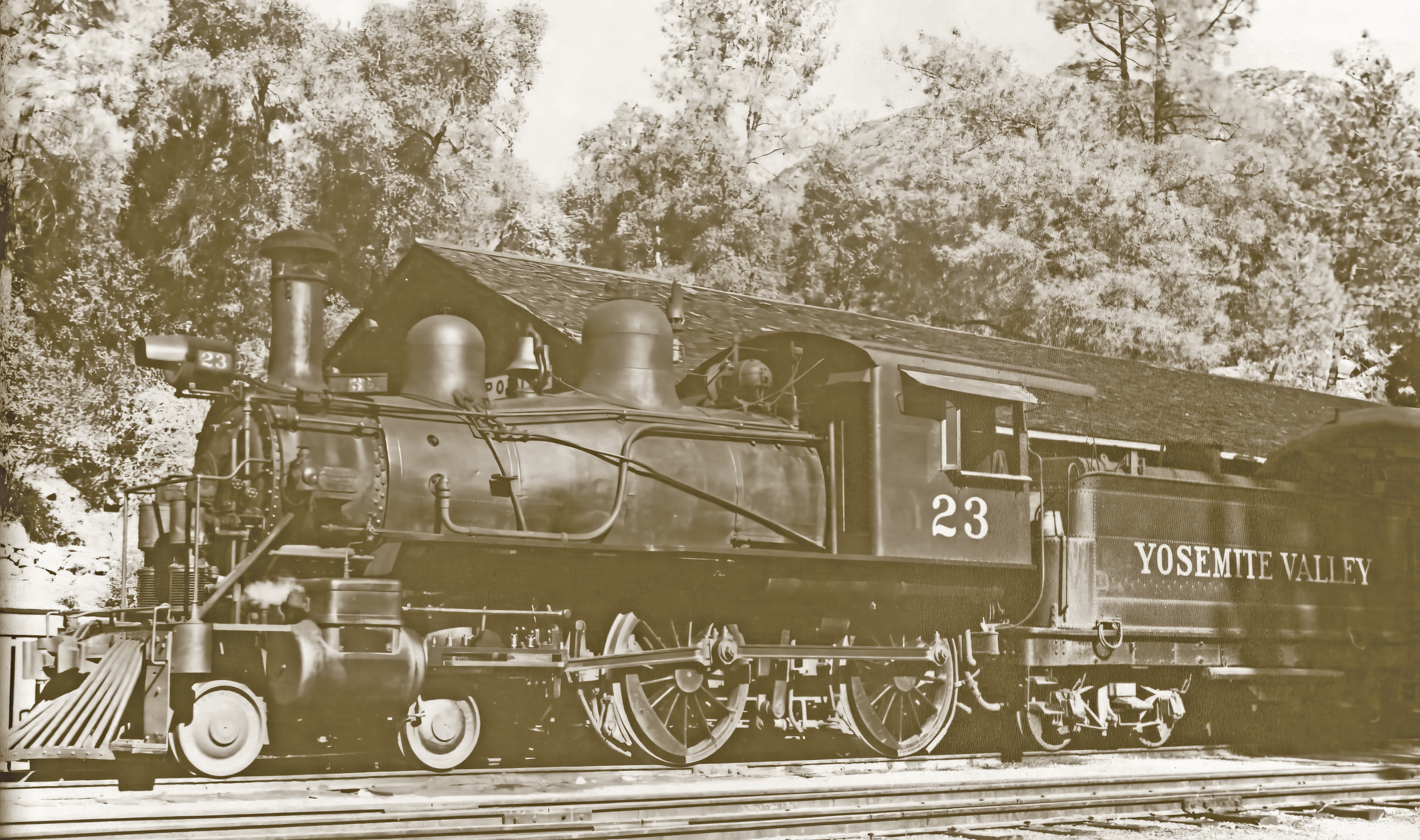
Engine 23

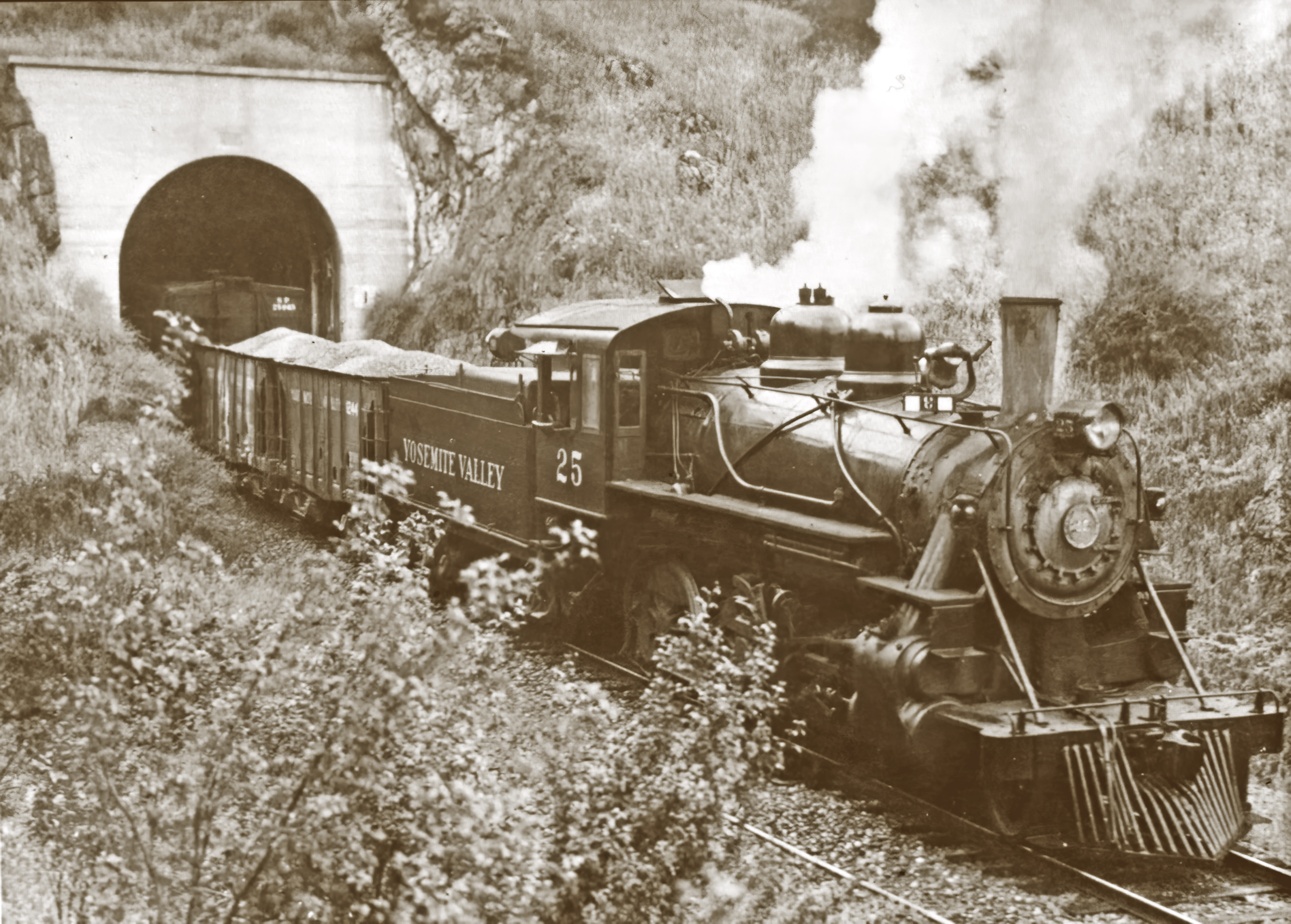
Engine 25

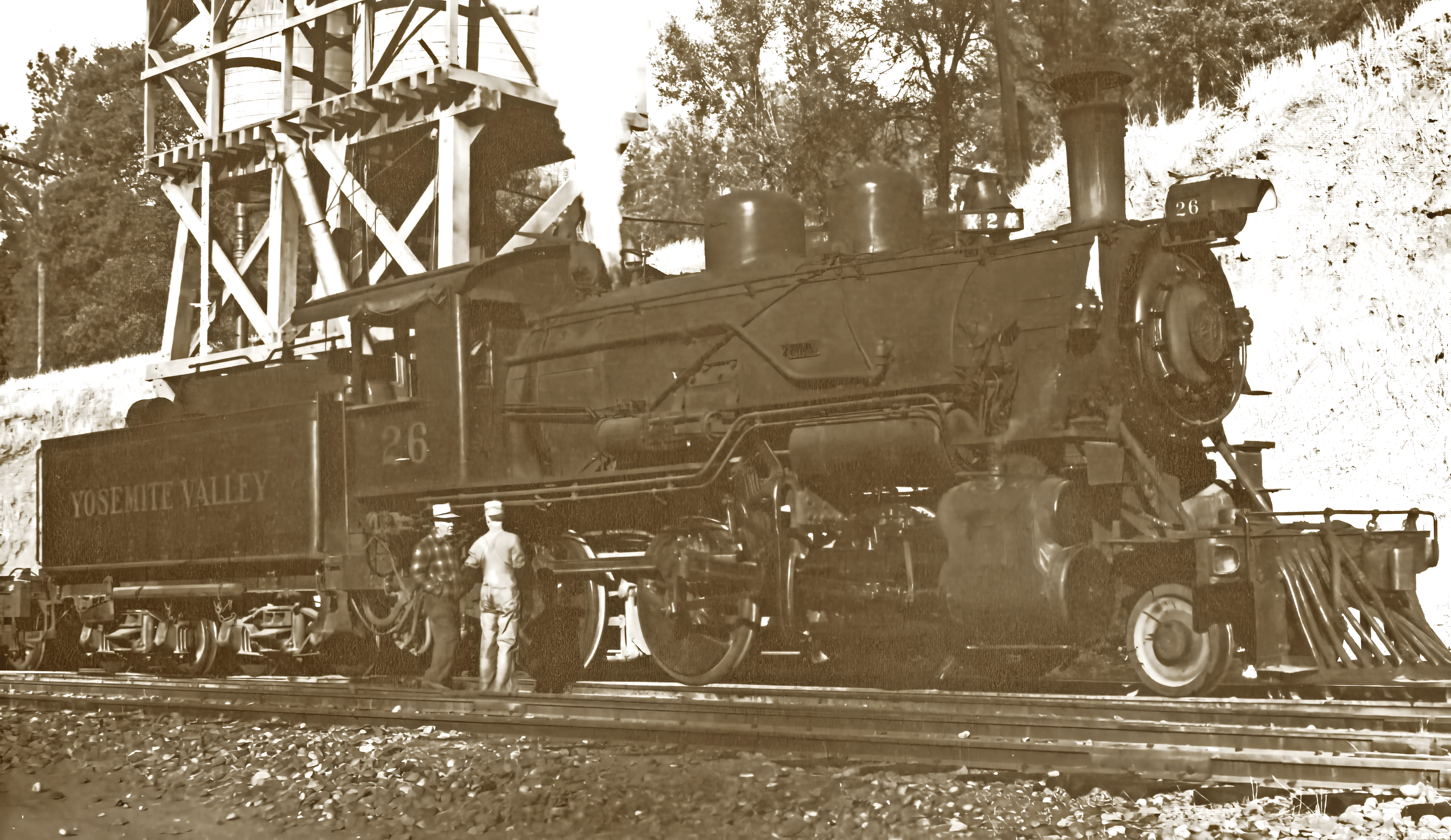
Engine 26

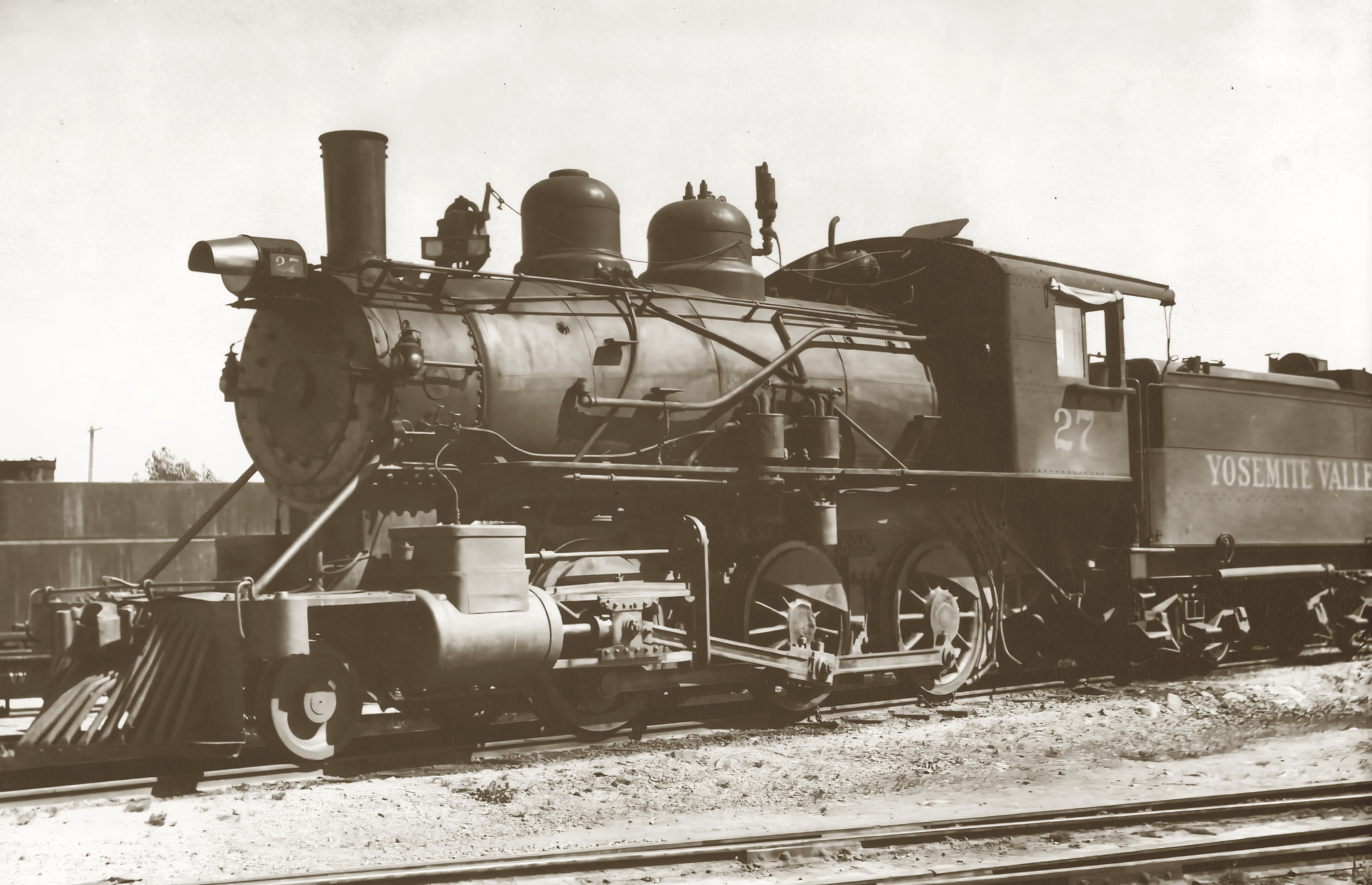
Engine 27

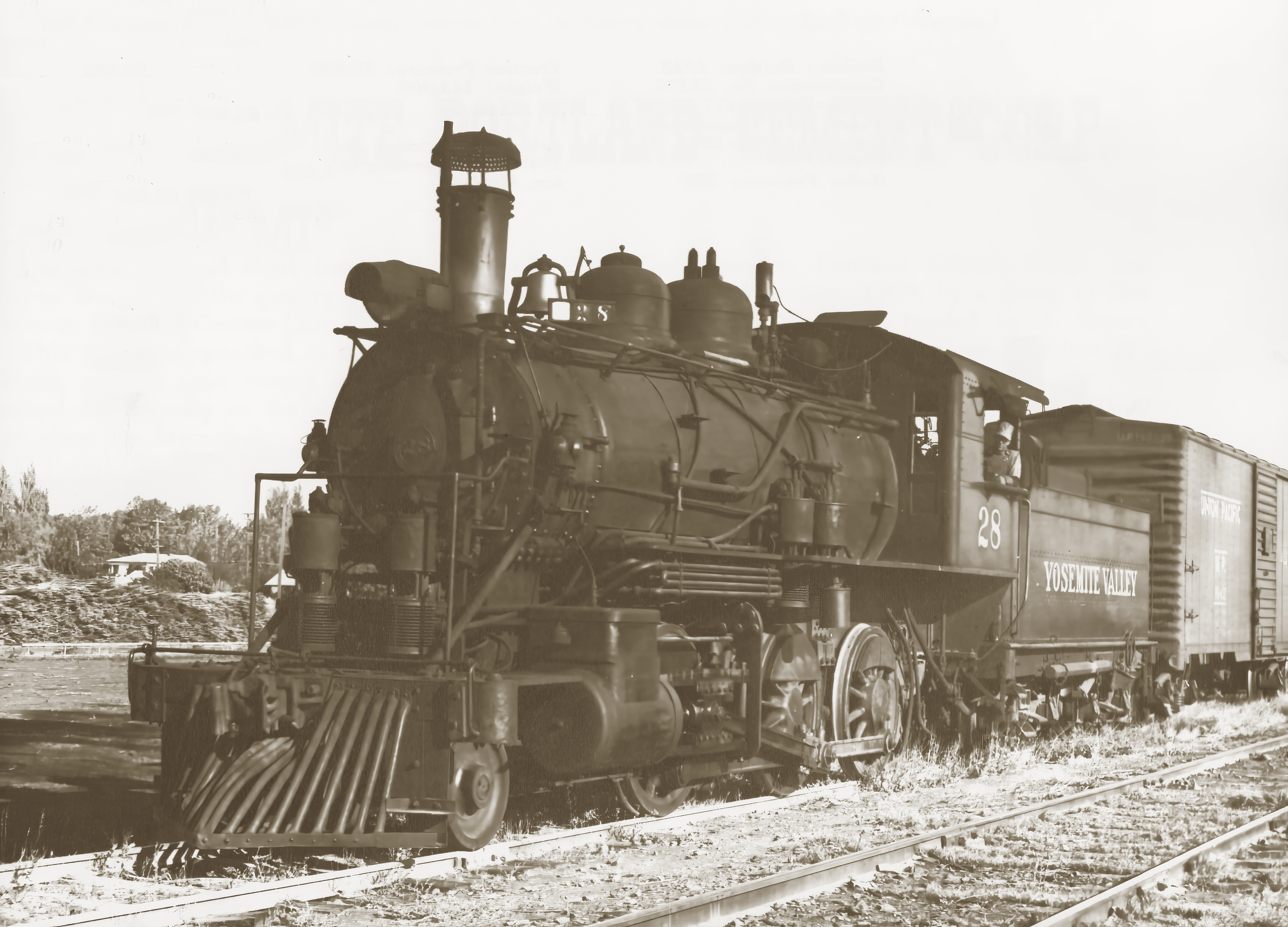
Engine 28

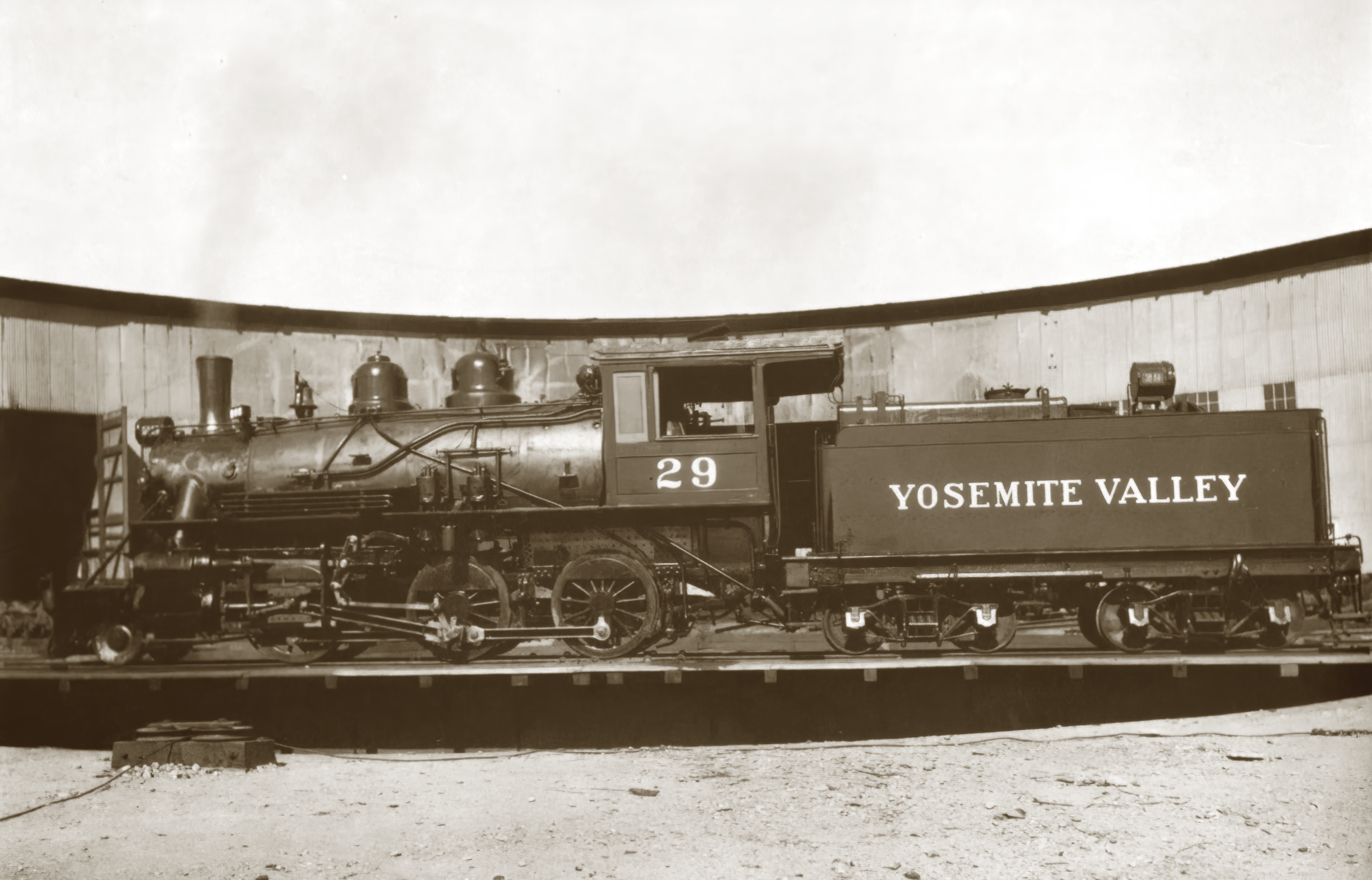
Engine 29

== See also ==
- Hetch Hetchy Railroad
- Sugar Pine Lumber Company
- Yosemite Mountain Sugar Pine Railroad
- California State Route 140
- Merced River
