= El Portal, California =

El Portal
- Census-designated place
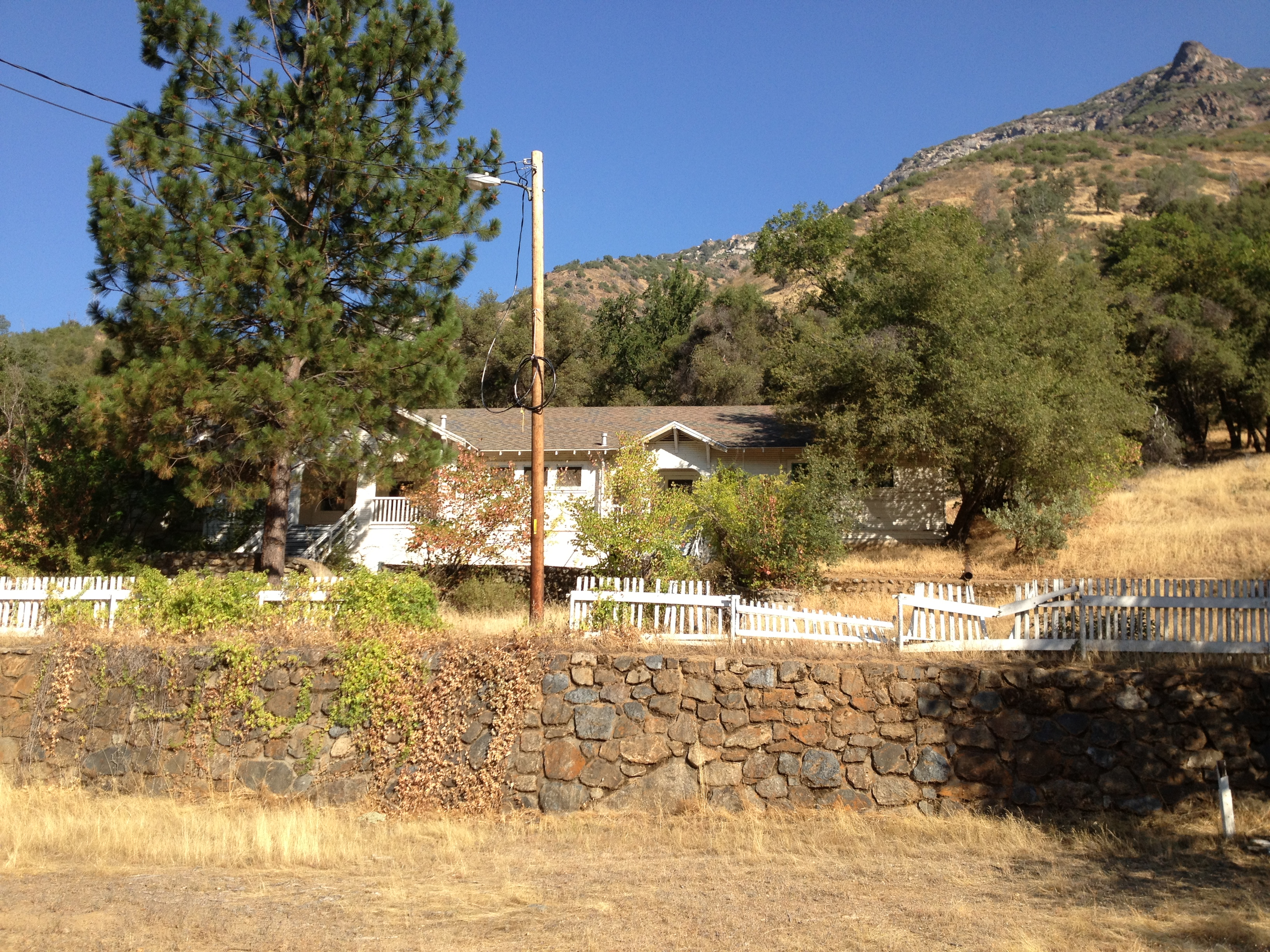
- The Old El Portal Schoolhouse

- Location in Mariposa County, California

- Location within the United States
- Coordinates: 37°40′25″N 119°47′13″W
- Country: United States
- State: California
- County: Mariposa

Area
  - Total: 1.910 sq mi (4.95 km^{2})
  - Land: 1.864 sq mi (4.83 km^{2})
  - Water: 0.046 sq mi (0.12 km^{2}) 2.41%
- Elevation: 1,896 ft (578 m)

Population (2020)
  - Total: 372
  - Density: 199.6/sq mi (77.1/km^{2})
- Time zone: UTC-8 (Pacific (PST))
  - Summer (DST): UTC-7 (PDT)
- ZIP Code: 95318
- GNIS feature ID: 2583008
- FIPS code: 06-22328

El Portal (Spanish for "The Gateway") is a census-designated place in Mariposa County, California, United States. It is located 11.5 miles (19 km) west-southwest of Yosemite Village, at an elevation of 1,939 feet (591 m). The population was 372 at the 2020 census, down from 474 at the 2010 census.

== History ==
The first post office at El Portal opened in 1907.

Work on a four-story Hotel Del Portal began in the fall of 1907 and was completed in 1908 by a subsidiary corporation of the Yosemite Valley Railroad. The hotel was a four-hour ride from Merced via a railway coach. On October 27, 1917, a fire destroyed the hotel including the Desmond Company's records, which was started by a defective attic flue.

== Community ==
El Portal lies along State Route 140 by the Merced River located on the western boundary of Yosemite National Park. It is partly under the administrative jurisdiction of Yosemite National Park. Community buildings include a post office, community center, and a small school. Town businesses include two hotels, a small general store, and a gas station.

El Portal was the terminus of the Yosemite Valley Railroad at the entrance to the National Park, and in 1978 Hetch Hetchy Railroad no. 6 was brought to El Portal and added to the National Register of Historic Places. El Portal is Spanish for "the gateway" derived from this fact.

== Geography ==
According to the United States Census Bureau, the CDP covers an area of 1.91 square miles (4.9 km^{2}), of which 0.05 square miles (0.13 km^{2}), or 2.41%, are water.

== Demographics ==
Historical population
Census	Pop.	Note	%±
2010	474		—
2020	372		−21.5%
U.S. Decennial Census; 1850–1870 1880-1890; 1900 1910 1920; 1930 1940 1950; 1960 1970 1980; 1990 2000 2010

El Portal first appeared as a census-designated place in the 2010 United States census.

The 2020 United States census reported that El Portal had a population of 372. The population density was 199.6 inhabitants per square mile (77.1/km^{2}). The racial makeup of El Portal was 297 (79.8%) White, 3 (0.8%) African American, 6 (1.6%) Native American, 9 (2.4%) Asian, 1 (0.3%) Pacific Islander, 12 (3.2%) from other races, and 44 (11.8%) from two or more races. Hispanic or Latino of any race were 36 persons (9.7%).

The census reported that 356 people (95.7% of the population) lived in households, 16 (4.3%) lived in non-institutionalized group quarters, and no one was institutionalized.

There were 179 households, out of which 45 (25.1%) had children under the age of 18 living in them, 55 (30.7%) were married-couple households, 17 (9.5%) were cohabiting couple households, 53 (29.6%) had a female householder with no partner present, and 54 (30.2%) had a male householder with no partner present. 85 households (47.5%) were one person, and 19 (10.6%) were one person aged 65 or older. The average household size was 1.99. There were 76 families (42.5% of all households).

The age distribution was 63 people (16.9%) under the age of 18, 9 people (2.4%) aged 18 to 24, 155 people (41.7%) aged 25 to 44, 104 people (28.0%) aged 45 to 64, and 41 people (11.0%) who were 65 years of age or older. The median age was 36.7 years. For every 100 females, there were 117.5 males.

There were 231 housing units at an average density of 123.9 units per square mile (47.8 units/km^{2}), of which 179 (77.5%) were occupied. Of these, 51 (28.5%) were owner-occupied, and 128 (71.5%) were occupied by renters.
