= John Wosky =

American architect

- Born: September 11, 1904; Iowa
- Died: July 28, 1979; Sebastopol, California
- Occupation: Architect
- Buildings: Crane Flat Fire Lookout, Chinquapin Ranger Station
- Projects: Generals' Highway Stone Bridges

John Bernard Wosky (September 11, 1904 – July 28, 1979) was an American architect and landscape architect and park superintendent. He worked for the National Park Service from the 1920s through the 1950s and designed a number of works that have been listed on the National Register of Historic Places. He was assigned to Yosemite National Park from 1928 to 1952, initially as the parks's resident architect, and later as its assistant superintendent. He later served as the superintendent at Crater Lake National Park and Hawaii Volcanoes National Park.

== Early years ==
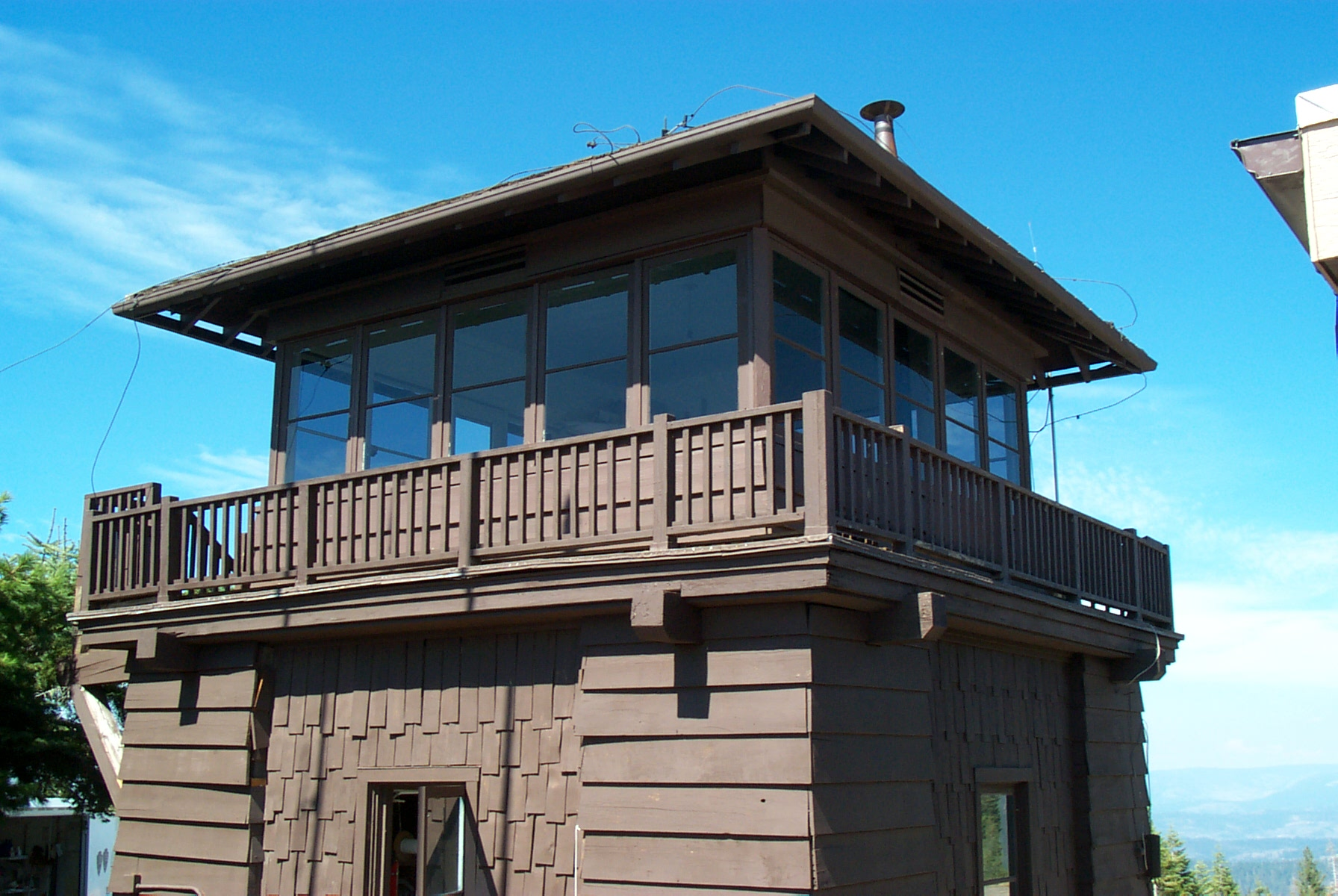
Crane Flat Fire Lookout

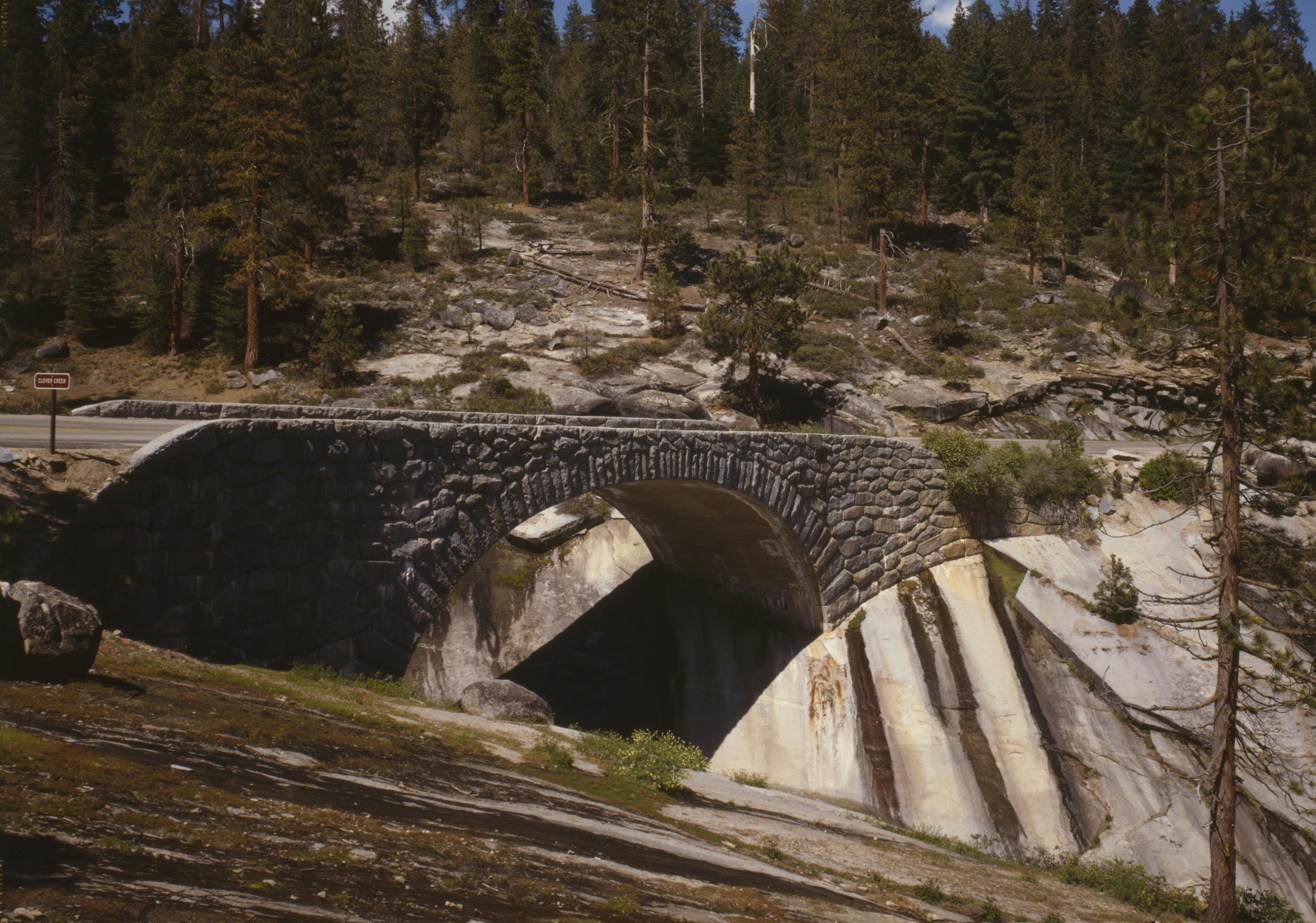
Clover Creek Bridge

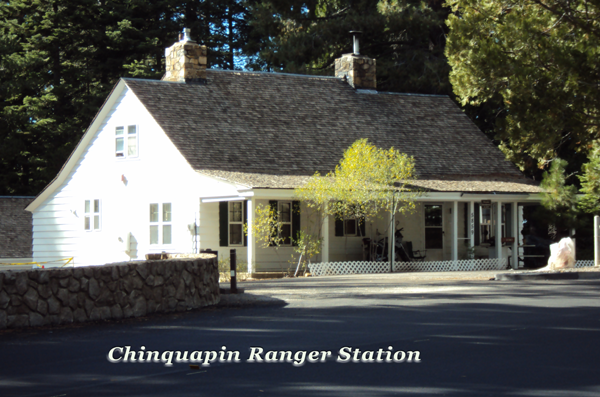
Chinquapin Ranger Station

Wosky was born in Iowa in 1904. His father Joseph Wosky was an immigrant from Bavaria who worked as a blacksmith in an Iowa coalmine. His mother Jane Wosky was an immigrant from Ireland. At the time of the 1920 United States Census, Wosky was living with his parents and three siblings in Des Moines, Iowa.

== Architectural career ==
In 1924, he moved to California and began working as a draftsman in the Los Angeles office of Gilbert Stanley Underwood (1899–1960), an architect best known for his design of National Park lodges, including the Old Faithful Lodge (1923), Bryce Canyon Lodge (1925), and Ahwahnee Hotel (1926). By 1926, he began working with NPS Chief Landscape Architect Thomas Chalmers Vint at the National Park Service (NPS).

Wosky returned to Iowa in approximately 1926. However, he returned to California in 1927 and became employed as an associate landscape architect by the NPS. He trained under Vint and developed a reputation as "an accomplished rustic architect." According to one historical account of NPS landscape architecture, "Vint took the opportunity to develop a designer with little design education into a specialized professional who could, for example, produce Park Service Rustic architecture designs, assess a Bureau of Public Roads location survey, and work with superintendents drafting development outlines." Many of Wosky's works while employed by NPS were in the "rustic" style that became known as "National Park Service rustic" architecture.

From 1928 to 1933, Wosky was assigned to Yosemite National Park as the park's resident landscape architect. In 1929, Lassen and Crater Lake National Parks were also placed within Wosky's area of responsibility. His surviving works at Yosemite include the Crane Flat Fire Lookout (1931), which was designed to blend with its natural surroundings and became a prototype for general use within the Park Service. Other works by Wosky at Yosemite include Buck Creek Cabin (1931), Henness Ridge Fire Lookout and the Chinquapin and Wawona ranger stations. Wosky also designed the Generals' Highway Stone Bridges, including the Clover Creek Bridge, Marble Fork Bridge, and Lodgepole Bridge (1930–1931).

== Administrative career ==
From 1934 to 1952, Wosky was the assistant superintendent at Yosemite. He also served as the park's acting superintendent from March to June 1937.

He also served as the superintendent of Crater Lake National Park from March 1952 to October 1953. From 1953 to 1959, he was the superintendent of Hawaii Volcanoes National Park. He concluded his career as the Chief of Operations for the NPS Western Regional Office.

== Family and death ==
Wosky was married to B. Frances Wosky. They had a daughter, Joan, who was born in approximately 1933 in San Francisco, California. Frances died in 1946, he remarried in 1947 to Naomi Davies.

Wosky died at Sebastopol, Sonoma County, California in July 1979.

== See also ==
- Architects of the National Park Service
