= Chinquapin =

Chinquapin or chinkapin may refer to:

== Plants ==
- Chinquapin or chinkapin, any of the shrubs in the genus Castanopsis
- Chinquapin or chinkapin, any of the several trees and shrubs in the genus Chrysolepis
- Chinquapin or chinkapin, some of the species in the chestnut genus Castanea
  - American chinquapin, Castanea pumila, a dwarf chestnut native to southeastern quarter of the U.S.
- Chinkapin oak (Quercus muehlenbergii), a species of oak whose leaves resemble those of chinkapins
- Dwarf chinkapin oak (Quercus prinoides), a closely related, more shrubby oak species
- Water-chinquapin, a name for the water plant Nelumbo lutea, American lotus
- Chinquapin rose, a name for Rosa roxburghii, an old Chinese rose

== Places ==
- Chinquapin, California, a former settlement in Mariposa County, California
- Chinquapin, North Carolina, a community in Duplin County, North Carolina
- Chinquapin, Texas, Matagorda County, Texas

== Institutions ==
- Chinquapin Preparatory School, a school in Highlands, Texas
- Chinquapin Middle School, a school in Baltimore, Maryland

== Other uses ==
- USS Chinquapin (AN-17), a ship in the US Navy
- Chinquapin Parish, a fictional parish in Louisiana and the setting for the 1987 play Steel Magnolias
- Chinquapin, a name for the redear sunfish (Lepomis microlophus)
- Chinquapin (newsletter), newsletter of the Southern Appalachian Botanical Society

== See also ==
- Chinquapin Grove, former name of Dacula, Georgia
- Chinqua Penn Plantation
