= Aspen Valley, California =

Unincorporated community in California, United States

- Unincorporated community
- Location within California Location within the United States
- Coordinates: 37°49′39″N 119°46′17″W
- Country: United States
- State: California
- County: Tuolumne
- Elevation: 6,161 ft (1,878 m)
- Time zone: UTC-8 (Pacific (PST))
  - Summer (DST): UTC-7 (PDT)
- Area code: 209
- GNIS feature ID: 1657957

Aspen Valley is an unincorporated community in Tuolumne County, California, United States. Its elevation is 6,161 feet (1,878 m). It is located in the western part of Yosemite National Park, approximately eight miles southeast of Mather.

It was the nearest community to the Crane Flat Fire Lookout, which is listed on the National Register of Historic Places.
