= Henness Ridge Fire Lookout =

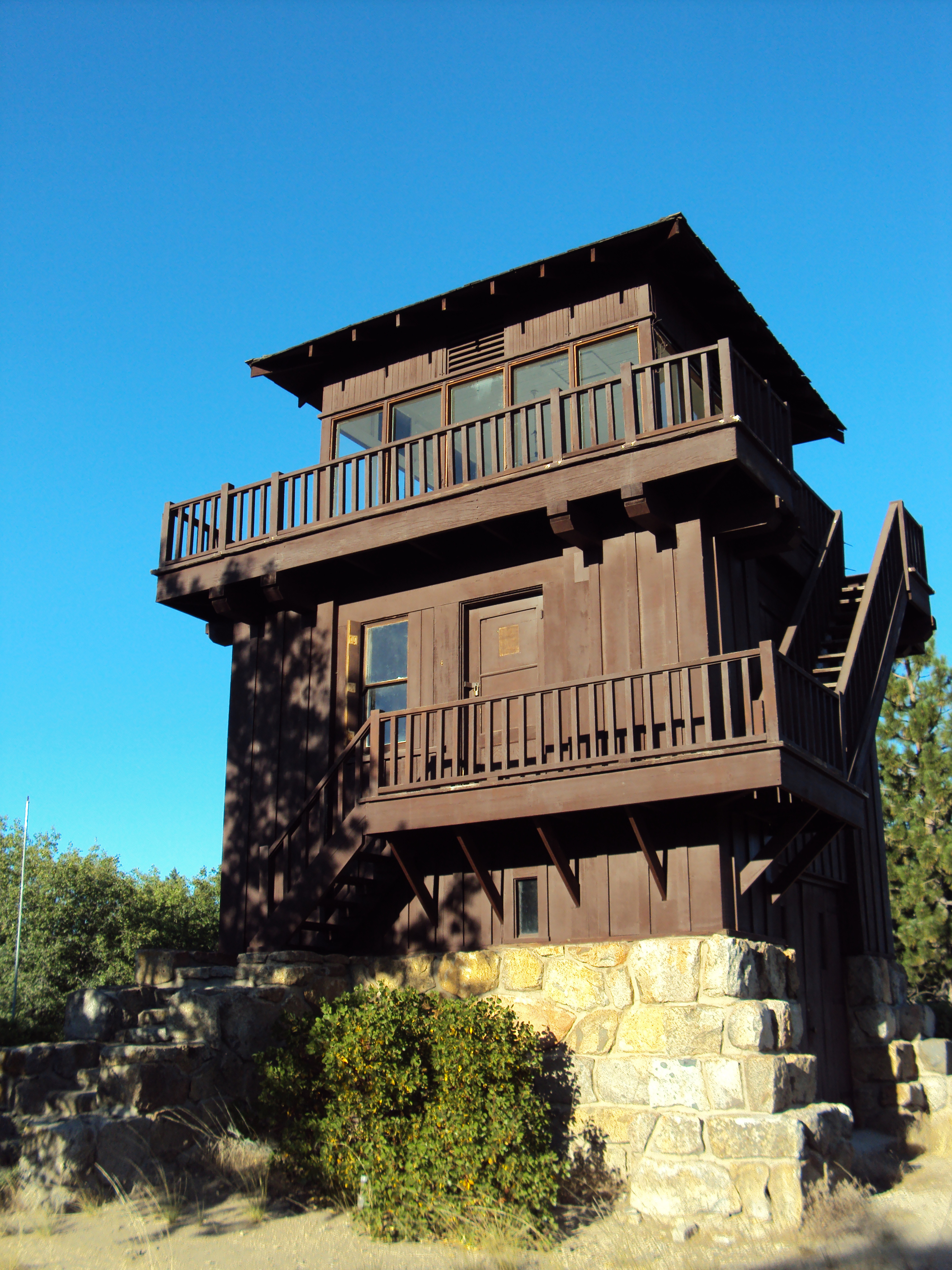
- Henness Ridge Fire Lookout, Built 1934 by the CCC

- Location within California

General information
- Architectural style: National Park Service Rustic
- Location: Yosemite West, California
- Coordinates: 37°38′21.50″N 119°43′13.82″W
- Completed: 1934
- Owner: National Park Service

Design and construction
- Architects: National Park Service Landscape Division; John Wosky

The Henness Ridge Fire Lookout in Yosemite National Park was built in 1934 by the Civilian Conservation Corps (CCC) which was a public work relief program for unemployed men age 18–24. The CCC provided unskilled manual labor related to the conservation and development of natural resources in rural areas of the United States.

One of two examples of the National Park Service Rustic style built in Yosemite, the Henness Ridge Fire Lookout is a three-story structure. On the lowest level, this version has a garage with room for one vehicle. The mid level is an office/bunk area with a 360 view of Yosemite and the surrounding Sierra National Forest. Atop this level is an upper observation area, with an overhanging roof. It is smaller than the underlying office level to provide a walkway around the periphery.

This lookout was the second built in Yosemite, with the prototype built at Crane Flat and was still in use in the 1980s. It was designed in the National Park Service Rustic style, and is one of only four similar structures in California, with the Crane Flat Fire Lookout being the only other in Yosemite. These lookouts were specifically designed to blend with their surroundings, in contrast to the metal towers used by the U.S. Forest Service.

"The 1979 case study recommended certain properties for further evaluation under the National Register criteria. Those included … the Henness Ridge structure is also significant in conservation. It is historic structure number 5300."

== Hiking trails in the Yosemite West Area ==
The hiking trail to the Henness Ridge Fire Lookout begins at an unmarked trailhead at the end of Azalea Lane in Yosemite West. Using the asphalt access road to the right, hike past the water towers and continue 0.7 miles to the Henness Ridge fire lookout tower. Of the four that were built, this historic site is one of only two remaining rustic-style lookouts in the state. Built in 1934 by CCC, it was used by the National Park Service for fire detection during the 1960s and 1970s.

At 6300 feet elevation, the site contains montane hardwood forest dominated by black oaks with a Greenleaf manzanita layer. Mixed conifer and hardwood species form the multiple forest layers seen here. Also, white and red fir is present.

== See also ==
- Yosemite West, California
- Yosemite National Park
- Yosemite Valley
- Badger Pass Ski Area
- Mariposa County
- History of the Yosemite area
- Chinquapin, California
