= Phillips' Ferry (Merced River) =

Coordinates: 37°31′29″N 120°19′16″W

Phillips' Ferry was a historical ferry crossing of the Merced River, located in present-day Merced County, California.

== History ==
Phillips' Ferry was one of the three main crossings of the Merced River on the San Joaquin Valley section of the 19th century Stockton - Los Angeles Road. They were located within 2 miles (3.2 km) downstream of the rapids known as Merced Falls. Closest downstream to the falls was Phillips' Ferry; then Belts Ferry − later Murray's Ferry near the later town of Merced Falls; and then Young's Ferry a mile and a half below Murray's Ferry.

=== John Phillips ===
John Phillips was an Englishman who came overland to California in 1849. After a while in the mines he came to Mariposa County and then returned to the East in 1851 and brought out his family the next year to Mariposa County on the Merced River where he established his ferry and a store.

In 1853, John Phillips' ferry was taken as the point for the new Merced County boundary between it and the original Mariposa County. Eventually Murray replaced his ferry with a $12,000 bridge. After a while the ferries lost the economic struggle with the bridge and Phillips moved to Hornitos.

The site of Phillips' Ferry across the Merced River is now marked by the bridge that carries the Hornitos Road across the Merced River.

== See also ==
- Stockton - Los Angeles Road topics
