= Hurricane Ridge Ski and Snowboard Area =

Ski area in Washington, United States

- Location in Washington Location in the United States
- Location: Olympic National Park, Washington, U.S.
- Nearest city: Port Angeles: 17 mi (27 km)
- Coordinates: 47.971°N 123.493°W
- Vertical: 700 feet (213 m)
- Top elevation: 5,500 feet (1,676 m)
- Base elevation: 4,800 feet (1,463 m)
- Trails: 10
- Lift system: 3 surface lifts
- Terrain parks: 1
- Snowfall: 400 inches (33.3 ft; 10.2 m)
- Snowmaking: none
- Night skiing: none
- Website: hurricaneridge.net

The Hurricane Ridge Ski and Snowboard Area is a small ski area in the northwest United States, located on the Olympic Peninsula of Washington. It is within Olympic National Park, seventeen miles (27 km) south of Port Angeles.

Hurricane Ridge is one of only three lift-serviced ski areas operating in a U.S. National Park (Badger Pass in Yosemite National Park, and Boston Mills/Brandywine Ski Resort in Cuyahoga Valley National Park are the others). It is the westernmost ski area in the continental United States.

During months when snow is present, the 17-mile road leading to Hurricane Ridge is prone to avalanches due to high speed wind conditions. Park rangers may close the road leading to the snow park for a whole day.
