= Yosemite Lumber Company =

Defunct logging company in Yosemite National Park, California, US

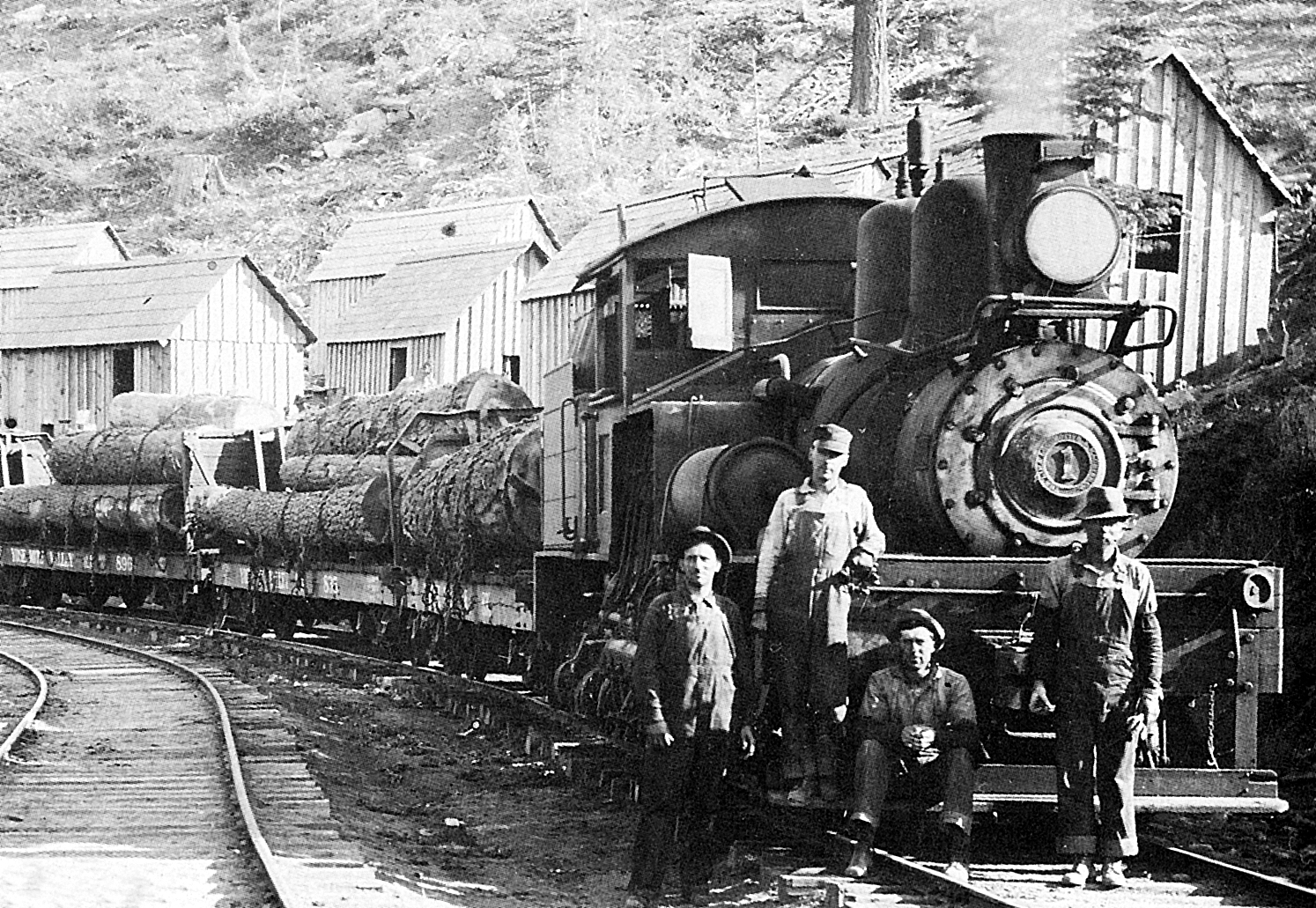

Overview
- Locale: Yosemite National Park
- Dates of operation: 1912–1942

Technical
- Track gauge: 4 ft 8 1/2 in (1,435 mm) standard gauge
- Length: 100 mi (160 km)

The Yosemite Lumber Company was an early 20th century Sugar Pine and White Pine logging operation in the Sierra Nevada. The company built the steepest logging incline ever, a 3,100 feet (940 m) route that tied the high-country timber tracts in Yosemite National Park to the low-lying Yosemite Valley Railroad running alongside the Merced River. From there, the logs went by rail to the company's sawmill at Merced Falls, about fifty-four miles west of El Portal.

Two special acts of Congress allowed the company to harvest timber in Yosemite National Park under the guidance that only "dead and decaying" timber be cut. An immense production allowance of two hundred million board feet suggested this was a loosely interpreted restriction. The company averaged a yearly cut of fifty-five million board feet during its thirty years in business. During that time, Yosemite Sugar Pine ran five shay locomotives across a hundred miles of track.

1n 1937, the federal government forced the sale of 7,200 acres of the company's finest sugar pine tracts, annexing them for protection inside the boundaries of Yosemite National Park. With its remaining timber holdings insufficient the company folded in 1942.

== Logging ==
=== The steepest logging incline ever built ===
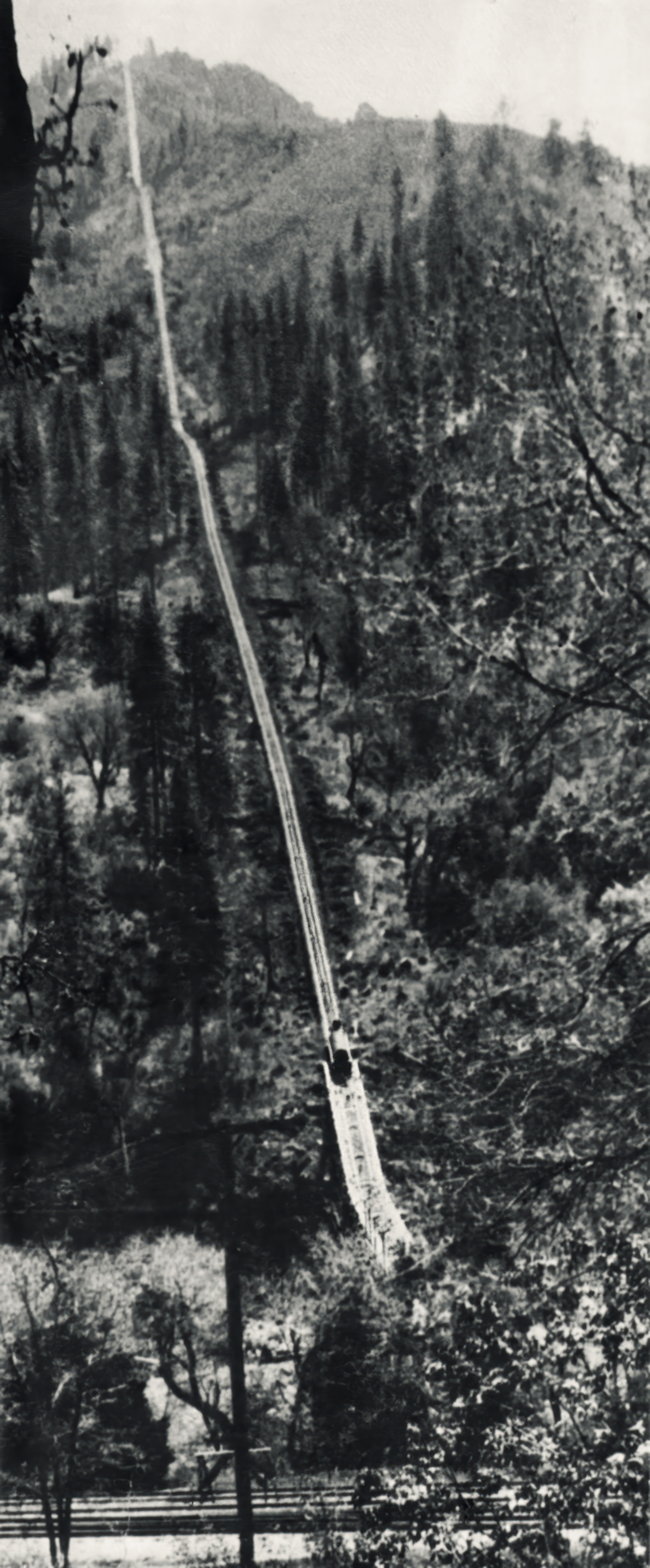
Yosemite Lumber Company El Portal Incline

The Yosemite Lumber Company constructed a railroad incline to access their timber holdings on a high tableland opposite El Portal. The incline, which was the steepest ever built, connected the timberlands high on the tableland with the Yosemite Valley Railroad located in the Merced River valley below.

The Yosemite Lumber Company built the incline in 1912, which spanned 8,100 feet (2,500 m) from El Portal to the top of Hennes Ridge. It featured a 48% grade at the start, changed to a 52% grade for several hundred feet, and then dropped to a 45% grade until reaching the middle of the incline. The last 2,500 feet (760 m) to the summit were the steepest on the line, with a dizzying 78% grade. Loaded log cars were let down the incline as empty cars were pulled up, using a counterbalanced arrangement. The incline had four trestles and two overhead hold-downs. The line speed reached 1,300 feet (400 m) feet per minute, with a handling capacity of about six cars per hour. The incline utilized 8,600 feet (2,600 m) feet of 1.5 inches (3.8 cm) wire rope pulled by a big steam-powered hoist manufactured by Willamette Iron Works.

All supplies and equipment used in the woods had to be pulled up the incline. The donkey yarder, in particular, had to haul itself up to the top of the incline first, which took around three months to complete. Some lumberjacks were so afraid to ride the incline they turned around at first sight and never made it into the woods.

==== Incline sled ====
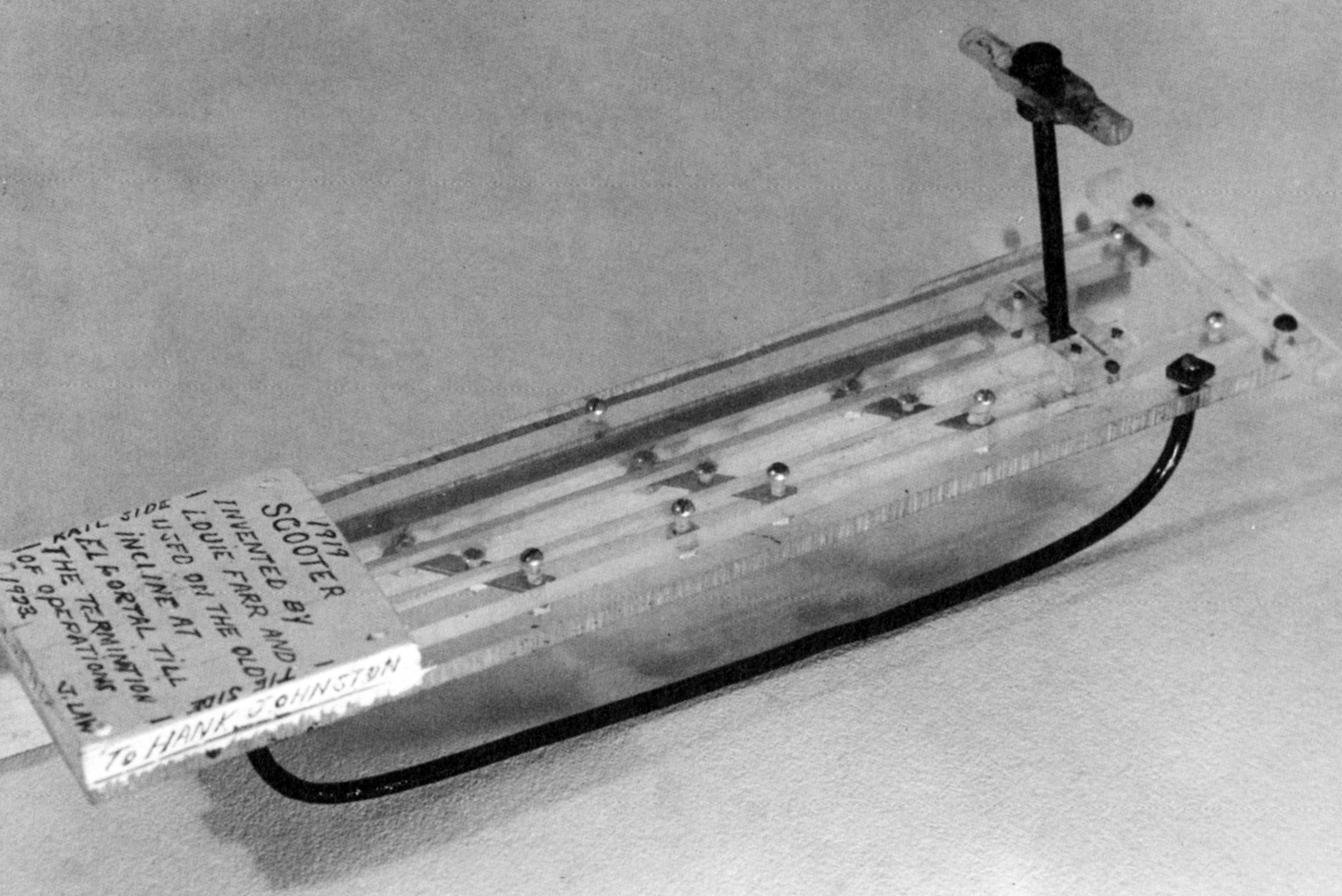
Incline Slide

Yosemite Lumber Company carpenter Louie Farr built a six-foot-long sled for riding down the southside incline above El Portal. The left edge of the sled had two cleats that straddled one rail, fastened to their underside. The right edge had a curved metal bar on the bottom that rode on top of the ties at rail height, keeping the sled level. Ties that were slightly higher than normal were trimmed to accommodate the bar. Pulling back on the front handle tightened the cleats against the rail, providing a friction brake. Many loggers rode the sled down the steep 8,100 feet (2,500 m) slope over the years, with the record from top to bottom being two and a half minutes, exceeding 35 miles per hour (56 km/h). However, many loggers were injured when the sled jumped the track at high speeds, leading to its discontinuation.

=== Timber operations ===
The Yosemite Lumber Company constructed its own logging railroad to reach their timber holdings. They started with a small two-truck Shay locomotive in 1912. A second, larger three-truck Shay was added the following year. The company used Yosemite Valley Railroad standard gauge bulk-head flat cars to haul timber. This meant that the same cars could move from the woods to the mill, loading only once.

The company claimed a cut of 35,000,000 feet of lumber in the first year, employing nearly 600 men. The Yosemite Valley Railroad began to run excursion trips to tour the mill at Merced Falls as interest in the lumber plant increased. The mill was advertised as the “most modern and up-to-date in the entire west.” Logging occurred from April to November due to heavy snowfall in the mountains. The company took pride in its safety record before the first two fatalities occurred in July 1914.

The Yosemite Lumber Company encountered challenges during World War I, with a lack of flat cars and available workers. Nonetheless, the company persevered and shipped six cars of finished lumber daily. They extended the logging railroad to Empire Meadow, which was approximately 15 miles from the incline. In 1919, the company tested a Climax locomotive, but ultimately returned it due to its inability to maintain a full head of steam. They replaced it with a fourth Shay locomotive.

In February 1917, the Yosemite Lumber Company and the United States government made a timber trade to preserve the scenery along the Wawona road. The company exchanged land next to the highway for government timber in less conspicuous parts of the forest.

In 1921, the company cut a record 60 million board feet of lumber, added 15 new log cars, and updated some mill equipment. Despite a fire in September that caused significant damage to the bakery and dining room at Merced Falls, the outlook remained positive. By 1923, the company had constructed more employee housing and added a second story to the Yosemite Valley Railroad station. It employed 700 workers and cut over 70 million board feet of timber, setting an all-time record for the company at that time.

=== North side operations ===
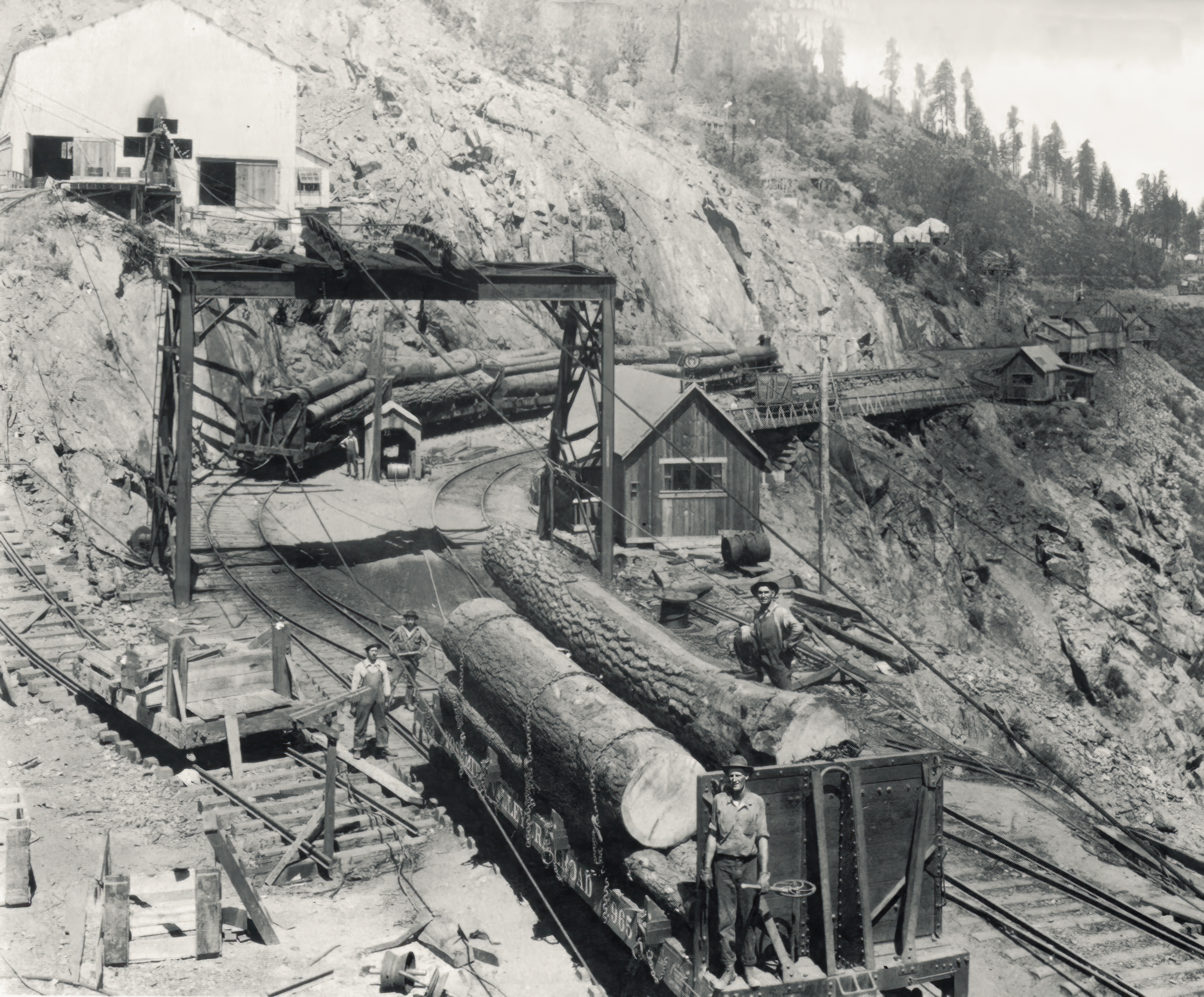
The north side incline around 1925.

In 1923, the Yosemite Lumber Company relocated its timber operation to the north side of the Merced Canyon due to the depletion of available timber on the south side. To fund the construction of a new incline, modernize the mill, and relocate the logging railroad, the company raised $5 million through a bond issue. A crew of 200 men worked around the clock to complete the new incline by the 1924 season.

The 8,300-foot incline, which cost nearly $1 million, required more than 400 rollers and had a maximum grade of 68 percent. A second incline was built above it to access additional timber. The main hoist, an electrically operated double-drum system, weighed 320,000 pounds. The incline was double-tracked for the upper half and transitioned to single track for the descent.

In 1924, the company set records by cutting 60 million board feet of lumber, followed by 85 million board feet in 1925. At peak times, it employed 500 men at the mill and another 500 in the timber camps, with a daily payroll of $5,500. To generate the revenue needed to meet bond payments, the company operated seven days a week, 10 hours a day.

== Merced Falls sawmill ==
The Yosemite Valley Railroad pulled log trains along the Merced River to Yosemite Lumber Company's sawmill at Merced Falls in the San Joaquin Valley. The mill broke ground in the summer of 1911. Over 945 tons of machinery was brought to Merced Falls by train including a 600-horsepower electric plant which electrified both the plant and the town. The mill operated seasonally, whenever the snow had cleared enough for logging trains to resume. By the 1920s, the mill delivered between 40 and 50 million feet of lumber every season and employed between 250 and 300 men.

The sale of alcohol was forbidden in the incorporated city of Merced Falls. But several saloons opened to serve mill workers just across the Mariposa County line. In 1918, a petition was raised to close the saloons as a war measure, citing the mill's role in support of government contracts.

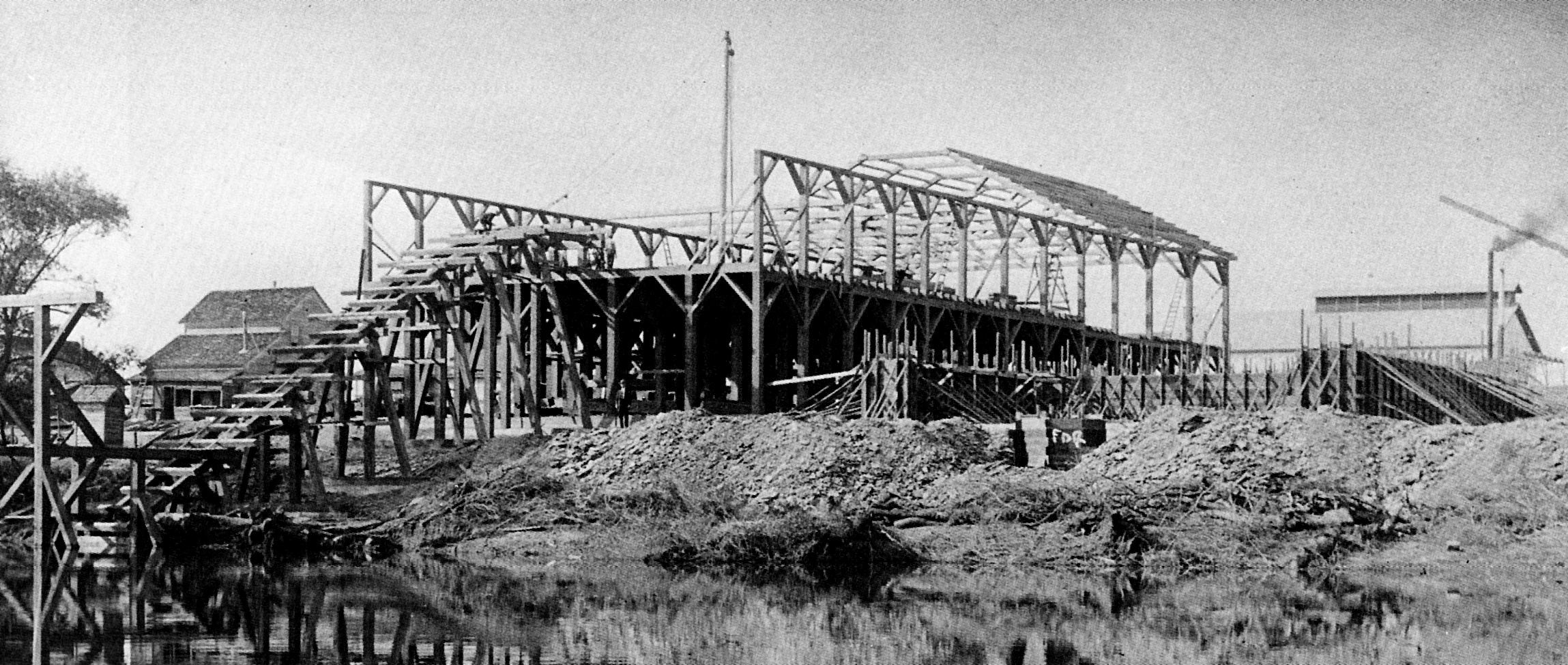
Mill under construction.

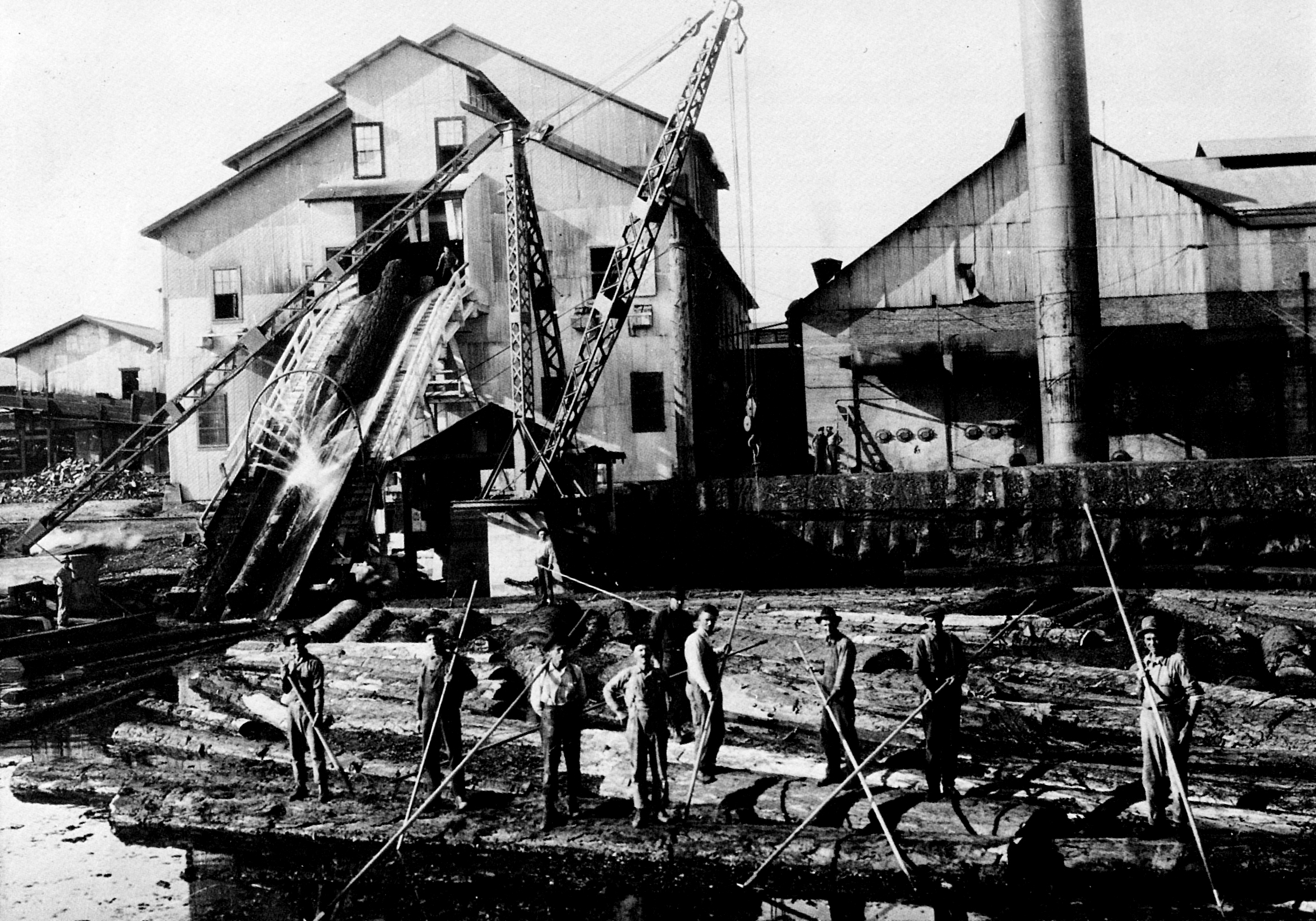
Sawmill and log pond.

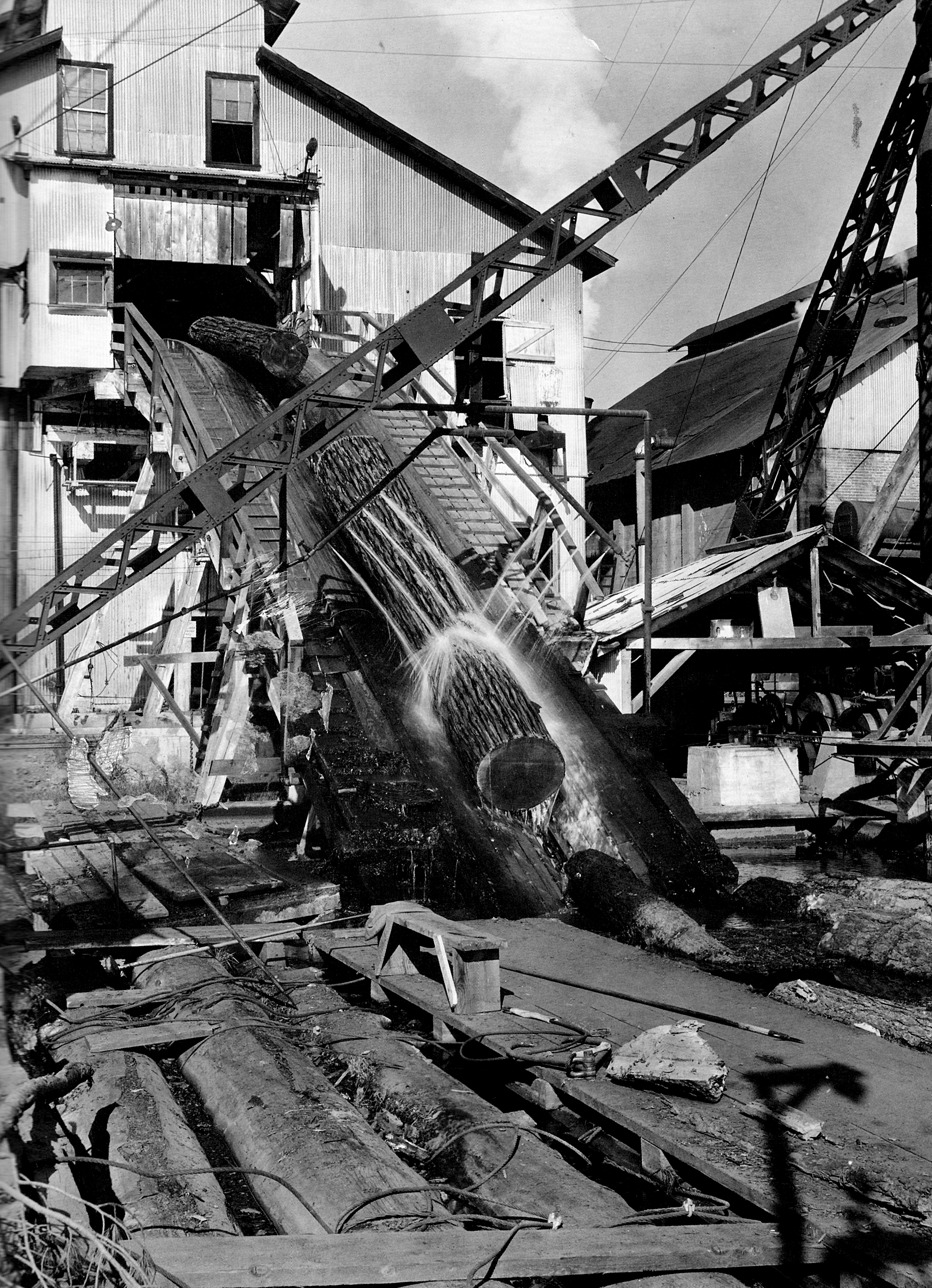
Log wash.

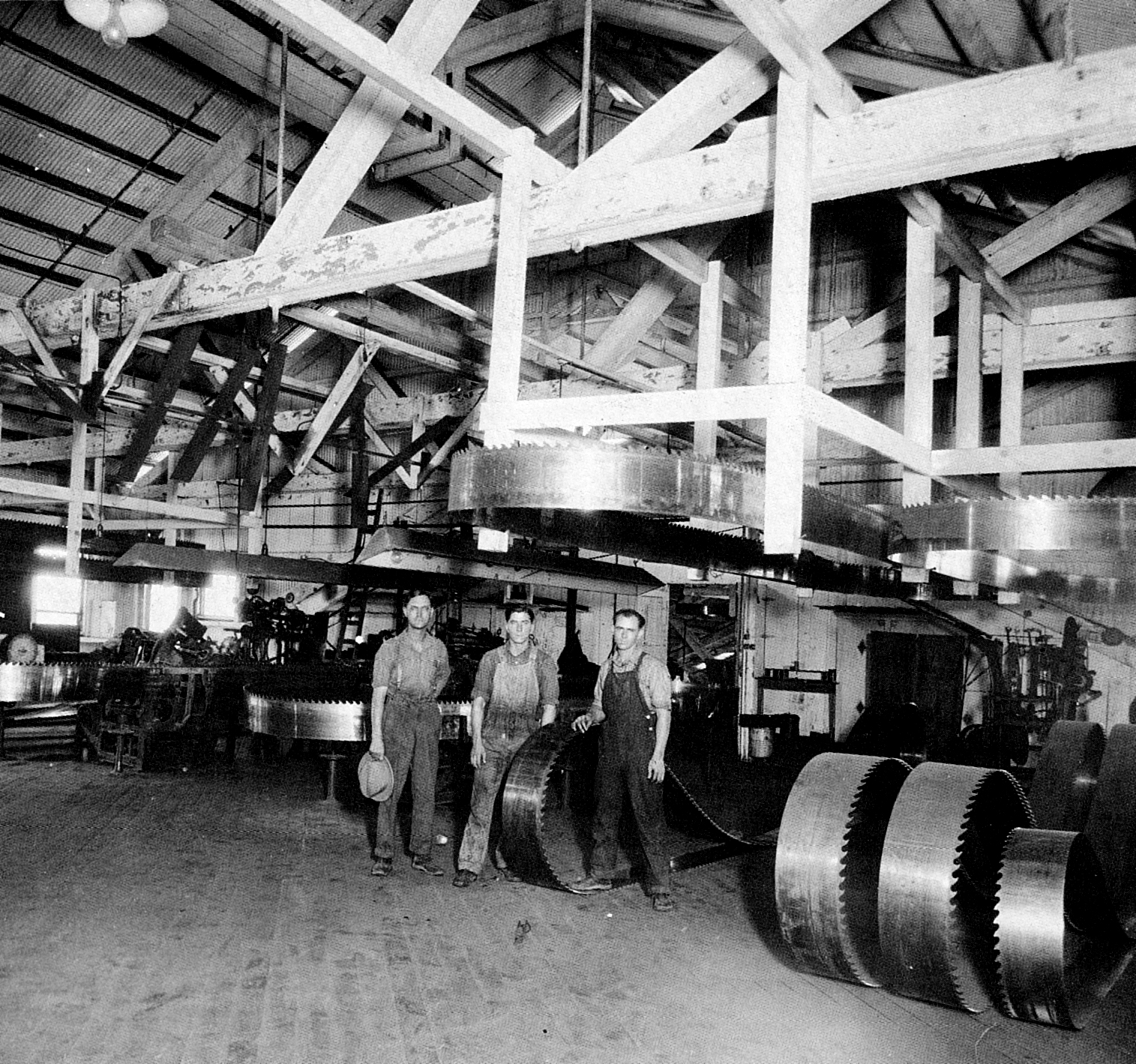
Saw sharpeners.

== Acquisitions and successors ==
=== Sugar Pine Lumber Company ===
In 1927, the Yosemite Lumber Company unexpectedly shut down, and rumors circulated that the White & Friant company had issued an ultimatum demanding the purchase of land to reach their own timber, which was refused. The Sugar Pine Lumber Company of Pinedale purchased the Merced Falls mill and the assets of the Yosemite Lumber Company for $6,000,000 and reopened the mill in May 1929. Initially, the plan was to bring all Yosemite Lumber Company timber to Pinedale for milling, but the Southern Pacific refused to permit the Yosemite Valley Railroad log cars on its trackage. The Sugar Pine Lumber Company was forced to reopen the Merced Falls mill, but eventually had to give up the Yosemite Lumber Company subsidiary due to the depression. Yosemite Lumber closed at the end of the 1930 season and Merced Falls dwindled into a “ghost city.”

=== The Yosemite Sugar Pine Company ===
John Ball, president of White & Friant, saw an opportunity to utilize his timber mixed with Yosemite Lumber Company holdings by consolidating his assets and reopening the Merced Falls mill himself under the name of The Yosemite Sugar Pine Lumber Company in July 1935. A $400,000 loan by the Reconstruction Finance Corporation helped reopen the mill in 1935 as depression era relief measure. The incline was refurbished, and the five Shay locomotives were put back to work. The reformed company sent the first logs to the Merced Falls mill in September 1935, and during the late season, they cut around 13,000,000 feet of lumber before winter. Production settled at 60,000,000 board feet annually starting in 1936, but the mill could process more. The incline was upgraded with new 400 horsepower motors and a replacement wire rope cable, increasing the hoist speed by 12%. In 1938, some truck logging began, and roads were built for independent contractors to bring logs to the railroad for transport to the incline. By the end of 1942, most of the available timber had been exhausted, and the last train load of logs arrived at the mill from the Yosemite Valley Railroad on November 15, 1942.

== Public opposition ==
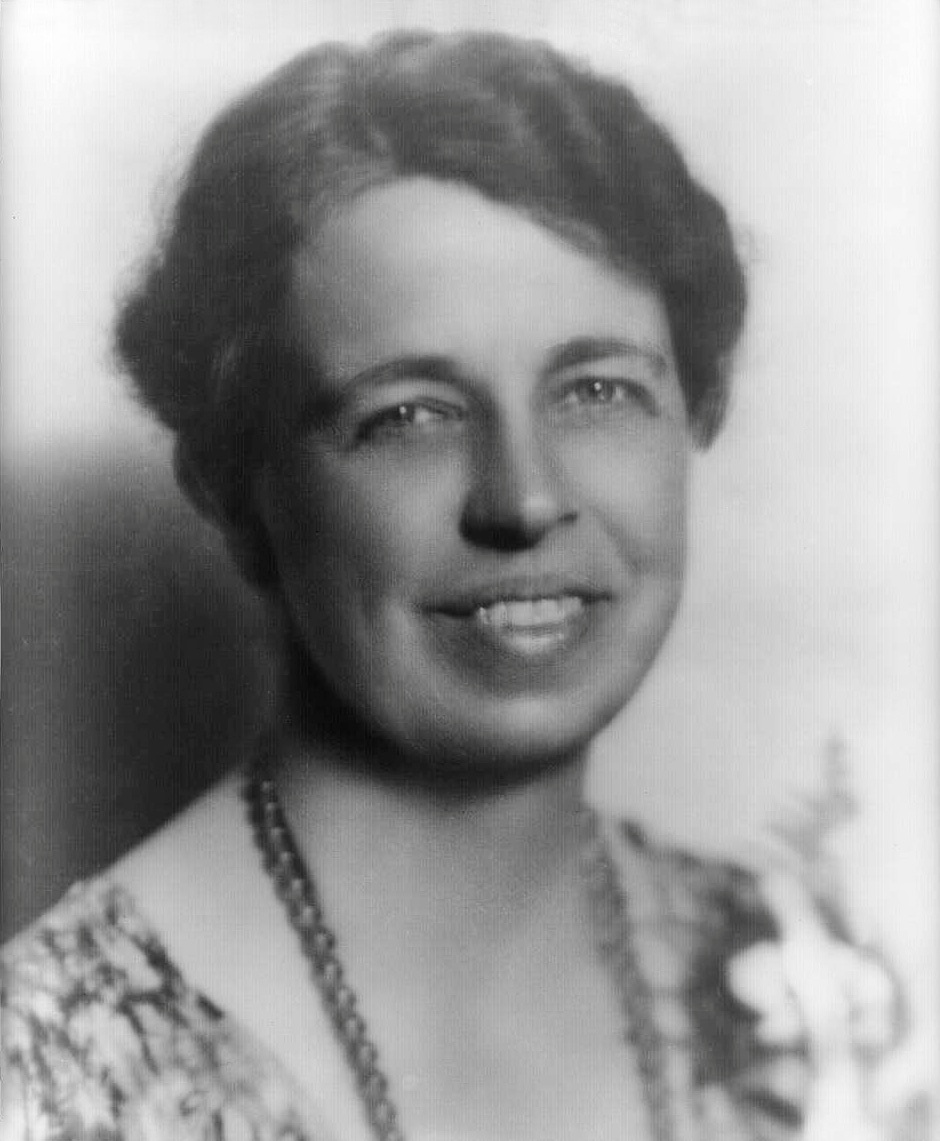
Conservation advocate Eleanor Roosevelt

In 1926, Willard Gibbs Van Name wrote a circular criticizing the National Park Service and the lumber company for the devastation caused by logging in the Yosemite National Park area. However, he struggled to generate much public interest, and logging continued without significant opposition.

By 1937, public opposition to logging had grown. The visit of Eleanor Roosevelt and Harold Ickes, Secretary of the Interior, led to a concerted effort to oust the lumber company.

John Ball, president of Yosemite Sugar Pine, was accused of failing to cooperate with the government. While the lumber company argued that selective cutting could preserve the forests, the issue had gained too much public attention. Legislation authorized the purchase of the Carl Inn Tract, a 7,200-acre stand of sugar pine, which was completed in 1939 for $1,495,500.

This purchase effectively ended the operations of the Yosemite Sugar Pine Lumber Company.

The mill operated until 1942, supplied by timber from Mariposa and Tuolumne counties north of the Merced River and west of Yosemite National Park.

== Legacy ==
Today, few remnants of the lumber operation remain. Within the boundaries of Yosemite National Park, many of the old Yosemite Lumber railroad beds were repurposed as part of the Yosemite West subdivision, while others have been reclaimed by the forest. In the San Joaquin Valley, the Yosemite Lumber Mill at Merced Falls is gone, and the community has become a ghost town.

== Locomotive roster ==
The Yosemite Lumber Company ran Shay locomotives produced by Lima Locomotive Works. Shay engines could be run forward or backwards, and could run on poor-quality track, making them ideal for logging in the woods. Unlike the narrow-gauge run by the nearby Madera Sugar Pine Company which allowed for tighter curves and lighter rails, YSP had to run standard-gauge rolling stock because of their direct connection to Yosemite Valley Railroad.

Name	Builder	Model	Date	Shop number	Weight	Notes
1	Lima	2T Shay	1912	2524	84,000 lb (38,000 kg)	Purchased new. Partly destroyed by fire in 1940. Rebuilt as Yosemite Sugar Pine Lumber Company No. 6. Sold Davidson Company (D) February 1943. Scrapped 1947.
2	Lima	3T Shay	1913	2660	122,400 lb (55,500 kg)	Purchased new. Sold Davidson Company February 1943. Scrapped April 1947.
3	Lima	3T Shay	1915	2803	146,000 lb (66,000 kg)	Purchased new. Sold Davidson Company March 1943. Scrapped April 1947.
4	Lima	3T Shay	1920	3092	164,100 lb (74,400 kg)	Purchased new. Sold Davidson Company May 1943. Became Levin Metals and Steel Corporation. Sold Heeber Creeper (tourist) near Salt Lake City, Utah, 1971.
5	Lima	3T Shay	1925	3092	174,700 lb (79,200 kg)	Ex-Mount Shasta Power Company No. 5, Bartle, California. Became Pacific Gas and Electric Company No. 5. Purchased by YSPL Co. 1930, No. 5. Sold Davidson Company April 1943. Sold Northern Redwood Lumber Company, Korbel, California No. 5. I-4, Sold Simpson Redwood Lumber Company, 1957, No. 5. Sold Learner Steel Company Oakland, California, 1957. Scrapped 1957.

Locomotives of The Yosemite Lumber Company

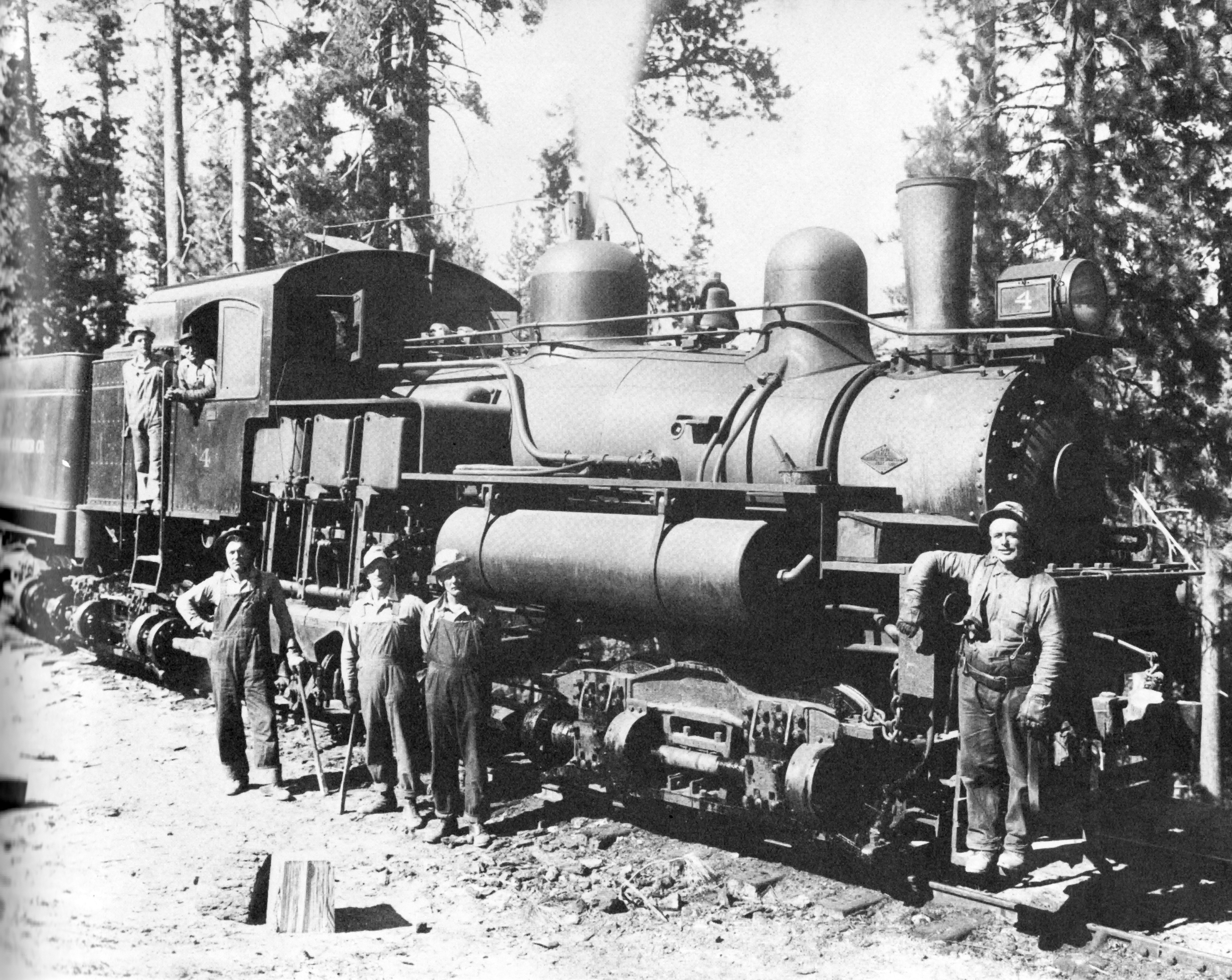
Engine No. 4 at Camp One in 1921.

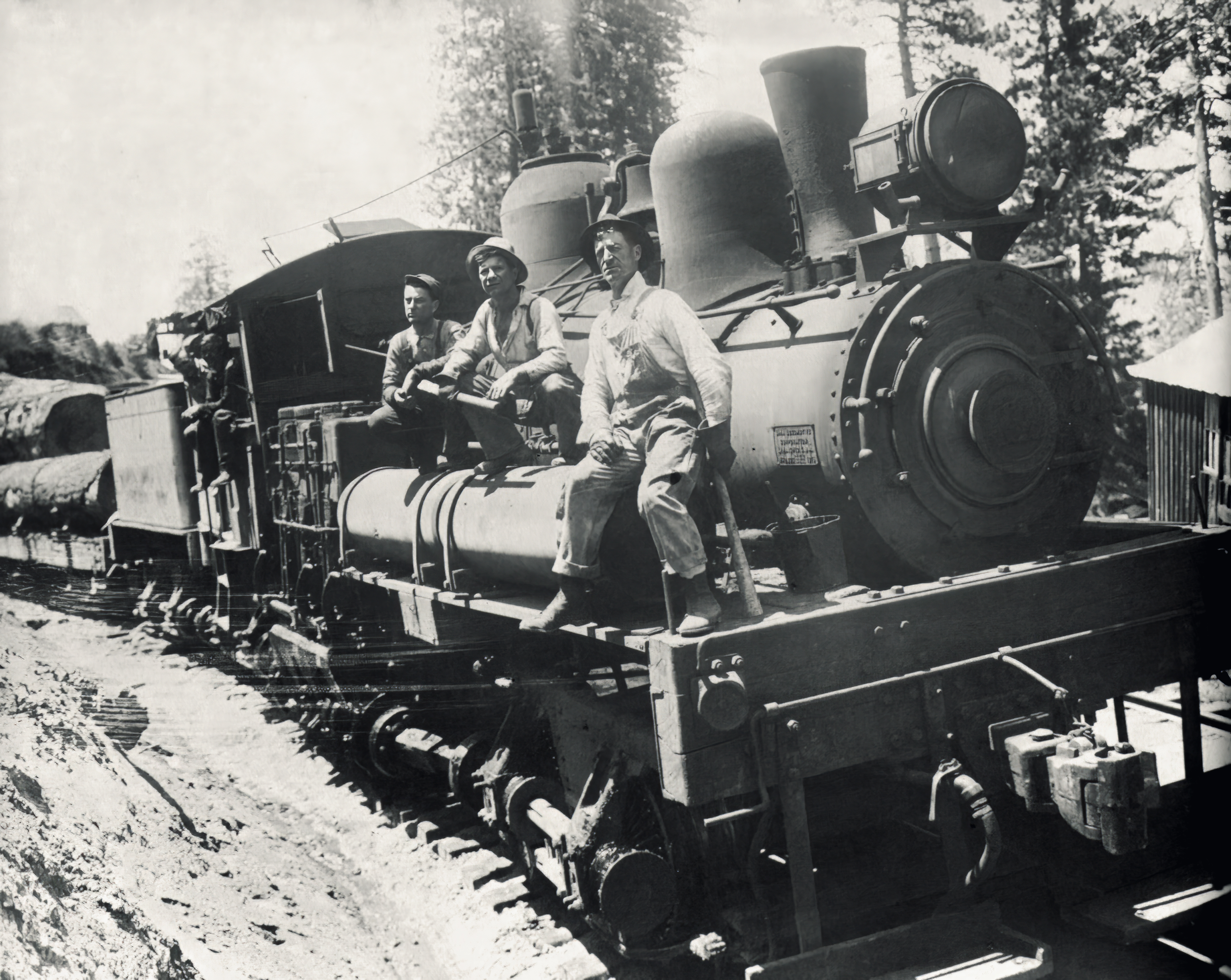
Engine No. 3 at the top of the original incline in 1920.
