= Merced Falls, California =

Unincorporated community in California, United States

Merced Falls
- Unincorporated community
- Location in California Merced Falls (the United States)
- Coordinates: 37°31′23″N 120°19′57″W
- Country: United States
- State: California
- County: Merced
- Elevation: 348 ft (106 m)

Merced Falls (Merced, Spanish for "Mercy") is an unincorporated community in Merced County, California, United States. It is located on the north bank of the Merced River, 6 miles (9.7 km) east of Snelling, at an elevation of 348 feet (106 m). Merced Falls was named for a set of rapids on the Merced River.

A post office operated at Merced Falls from 1856 to 1957. The town was founded here because, during the California Gold Rush, the three main crossings of the Merced River on the Stockton - Los Angeles Road were located within 2 miles (3.2 km) downstream of the rapids of Merced Falls. Closest to the falls was Phillips' Ferry, then Belts Ferry (later Murray's Ferry and Murray's Bridge and near what later became Merced Falls), and then Young's Ferry. Murray's Bridge was washed away in the Great Flood of 1862 but was later rebuilt.

The rapids of Merced Falls were used in the 1890s to power several watermills located in the town. A pair of sawmills in Merced Falls cut wood for the Yosemite and Sugar Pine Lumber Company, which shipped lumber down from the Sierra Nevada on the Yosemite Valley Railroad. The city continued to function well into the 1920s as a hub for tourists travelling into Yosemite Valley via the railroad. With the construction of the Central Pacific Railroad north-south across the Central Valley, many towns, including Merced Falls, that were not on the railroad fell into disrepair. The rapids themselves were inundated by McSwain Dam, built across the Merced River in the 1960s. Merced Falls is now surrounded by irrigated farmland, and the community itself is almost abandoned.
