= Badger Pass Ski Area =

Ski area in California, United States

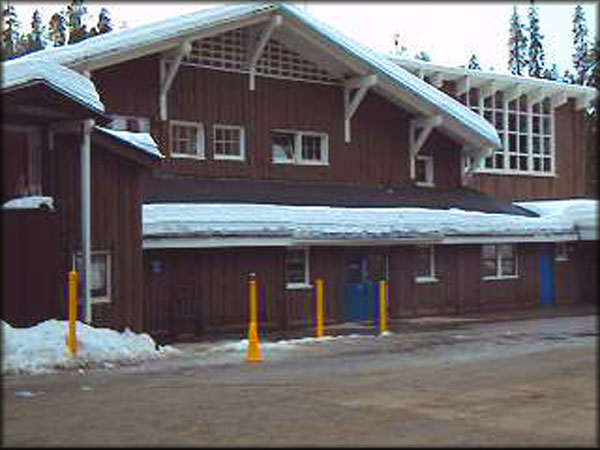
- The historic Badger Pass Ski Lodge

- Location in California Badger Pass Ski Area (the United States)
- Location: Yosemite National Park, California
- Nearest major city: Mariposa, California
- Coordinates: 37.66194°N 119.6636°W
- Vertical: 800 ft (240 m)
- Top elevation: 8,000 ft (2,400 m)
- Base elevation: 7,200 ft (2,200 m)
- Skiable area: 90 acres (36 ha)
- Trails: 10 total 35% easiest 50% more difficult 15% most difficult
- Longest run: 0.4 mi (640 m)
- Lift system: 5 lifts: 1 triple chair 3 double chairs 1 surface lift
- Lift capacity: 6,800 skiers/hr
- Terrain parks: 1
- Snowfall: 300 in (7.6 m)
- Night skiing: None

Badger Pass Ski Area is a small ski area located within Yosemite National Park. Badger Pass is one of only three lift serviced ski areas operating in a US National Park (Hurricane Ridge Ski and Snowboard Area in Olympic National Park and Boston Mills/Brandywine Ski Resort in the Cuyahoga Valley National Park are the others). It is situated five miles (8 km) south-southeast of the Chinquapin intersection of Wawona Road (HWY 41 continuation) with Glacier Point Road in the southern area of Yosemite National Park. Glacier Point Road provides the access to this ski area. During high snow level and/or ski season, Glacier Point road terminates at Badger Pass Ski Resort. Under these conditions, the remainder of Glacier Point Road is used for cross-country skiing access to Glacier Point and other destinations in the high country.

== Location ==
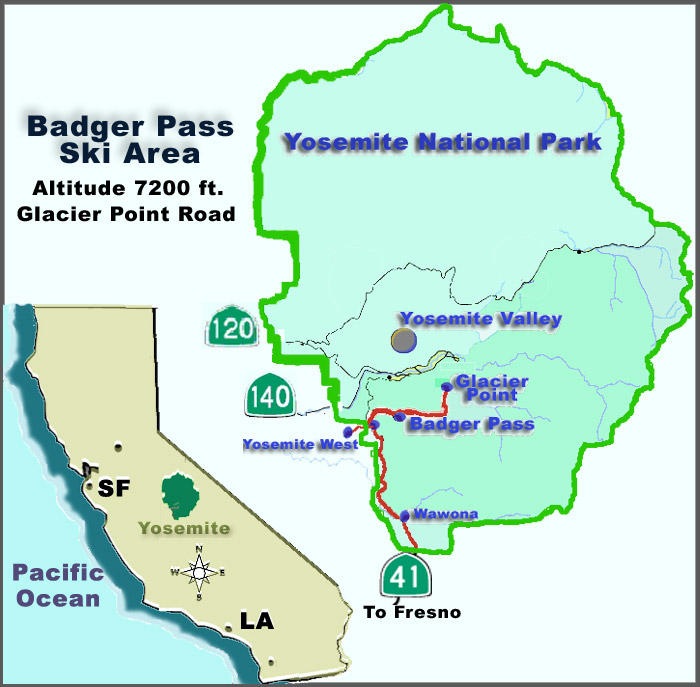

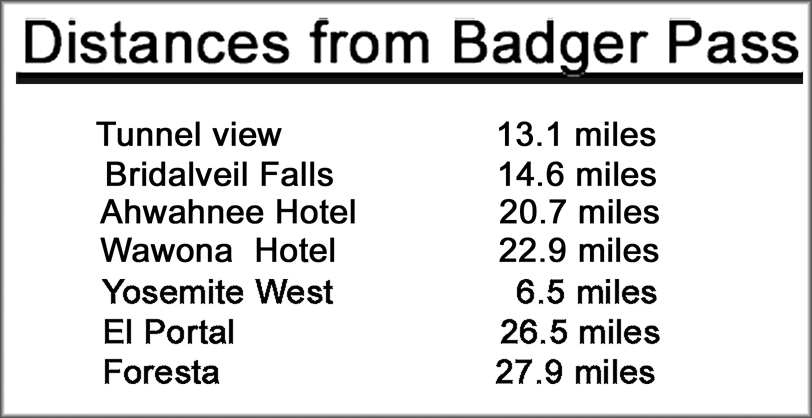
Distance mileage table for facilities and communities near Badger pass

Badger Pass is at about 7,200 feet (2,200 m) in elevation at the restaurant and services buildings. At the summit of the downhill ski lifts, elevations rise to 8,000 feet (2,400 m). The nearest community to Badger Pass is Yosemite West. The 90-acre (36 ha) skiing area provides 10 runs and 5 lifts with downhill, snow tubing and snow boarding facilities. There are also training areas with instructors for beginners and novices that need "brushing up". A snow tubing area has been added near the cross-country equipment rental area. For safety reasons, this area is "roped off" so that skiers can not enter the area.

In addition to the downhill facilities, there are extensive cross-country skiing and snowshoe trails. In fact this is one of the highlights of the Badger Pass/Yosemite National Park winter activities. There are over 84 miles (135 km) of trails encompassing many of the tourist sites in Yosemite. In addition, two overnight huts are available for extended winter trips into the wilderness.

== History ==
The history of winter sports in Yosemite National Park is unique. Following the building of the Ahwahnee Hotel in 1925–1927, came Yosemite’s first ski school in 1928 with Jules Fritsch as instructor. Fritsch, a Swiss ski expert was part of a trained staff of winter sports experts available in Yosemite. Fritsch and the staff led six-day snow excursions in Yosemite from the Ahwahnee to Tenaya Lake to bolster the ski school. Many believe this ski school was the first in California. In conjunction with the Curry Company, one of the first projects was the 1927 construction of a four-track toboggan slide near Camp Curry. Dr. Donald Tresidder, the first president the Yosemite Park & Curry Company and its guiding force, saw the visitor interest in winter sports and immediately formed the Yosemite Winter Club. With the club’s enthusiast support, a small ski hill and ski jump near Tenaya Creek Bridge was built in 1928.

With the interest building in Yosemite for winter sports, and the Olympics selecting Los Angeles as the site for the summer games for 1932, Tresidder teamed up with William Garland, president of the Steering Committee of the Plays of Los Angeles to promote Yosemite for winter sports for the Olympics of 1932.

Lake Placid was selected instead. This did not diminish the interest in winter sports in Yosemite, but rather intensified it. Tresidder could see the need for real facilities in Yosemite for winter sports.

A lift was built in 1933 but it was not at the Ahwahnee but at Badger Pass some miles away. The first slalom in California was held in 1933 at Badger Pass. With the lingering effects of The Great Depression and the difficult road access to Badger Pass, the need for an easier route to the high country slowed further development.

The History of the Yosemite area depicts the building of the tunnel as follows:

"The completion of the 0.8 mile (1.3 km) long Wawona Tunnel in 1933 was both an engineering marvel and significantly reduced the amount of travel time to the Valley from Wawona without scarring the landscape with a long road cut (the famous 'Tunnel View' is on the Valley side of the tunnel and Inspiration Point is above it)."

After the Wawona Road and Tunnel opened in late 1933 and Glacier Point Road to Badger Pass opened in 1935, Yosemite's first ski lodge was built in Monroe Meadow, and by the end of the season Badger Pass had welcomed more than 25,000 skiers. The West's first ski lift, called the Upski, was installed in 1936. Nicknamed the “Queen Mary,” it was a large sled that moved up and down the hill on a cable, carrying six skiers at a time up to the summit.

Also with completion of the new Wawona Road and tunnel, visitors began to use the Chinquapin area for skiing as well as the Badger Pass slope. Because of the poor condition of the Glacier Point road, the Yosemite Park and Curry Company became interested in installing the cable tramway as a means of getting skiers to the south rim. Gradually valley floor winter activities faded and skiers concentrated on Badger Pass and the high country, especially after improvement of the Glacier Point road afforded greater accessibility to that area.

Due to a naming rights dispute in which outgoing concessionaire Delaware North Parks and Resorts claimed to own the names of several Yosemite locations as intellectual property, Badger Pass was renamed "Yosemite Ski & Snowboard Area" effective March 1, 2016. The resort regained its historic name on July 15, 2019, when a legal settlement was reached.

== Badger Pass today ==
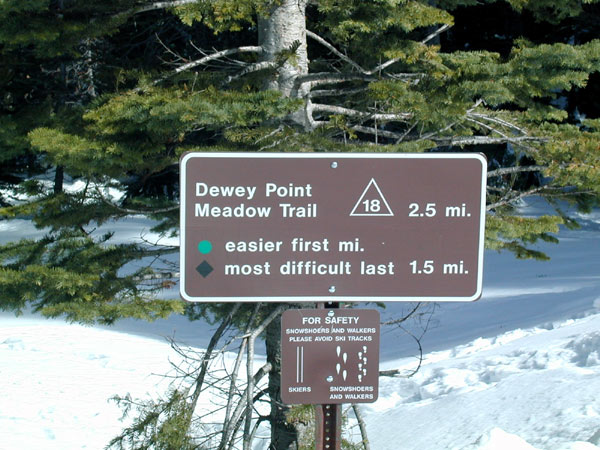
Trail marker describing the Dewey Point cross-country ski trail

Today, the Badger Pass Ski Area provides a public venue for both downhill and snowboarding activities. It is operated for the National Park Service by the current concessionaire, Aramark. One of the major features of the area is the restored Badger Pass Day Lodge, which houses the Snowflake Room. From this pub visitors can view the 10 down-hill runs and the 5 lifts. The Lodge no longer has overnight accommodations and is for day use only. Food concessions and an activities desk are located on the lower level of the lodge. Several ski schools, catering to both beginners and advanced skiers, operate on the slopes.

In addition, cross-country skiing is available for those visitors interested in a back country experience. With instructors and guides available, Yosemite provides 22 miles (35 km) of groomed cross-country track and 90 miles (145 km) marked trails. For the cross-country skier there are more than 9 miles (14 km) of skiing lanes. These are located along a groomed portion of Glacier Point road. Equipment for cross-country skiing can be rented by the day from the ski rental department on the bottom floor of the lodge.

It is a 21-mile (34 km) round-trip from Badger Pass to Glacier Point. The views of Half Dome in winter are spectacular. The National Park Service, in conjunction with The Yosemite Association, provides webcams of the vistas along this route. A guided ski trip on intermediate groomed terrain leads to the Glacier Point Ski Hut. This overnight trip affords snow-covered vistas of Half Dome and Vernal Falls from Glacier Point.

Badger Pass hosts the annual Yosemite Nordic Holiday, a series of cross-country races held every February.

== Gallery ==
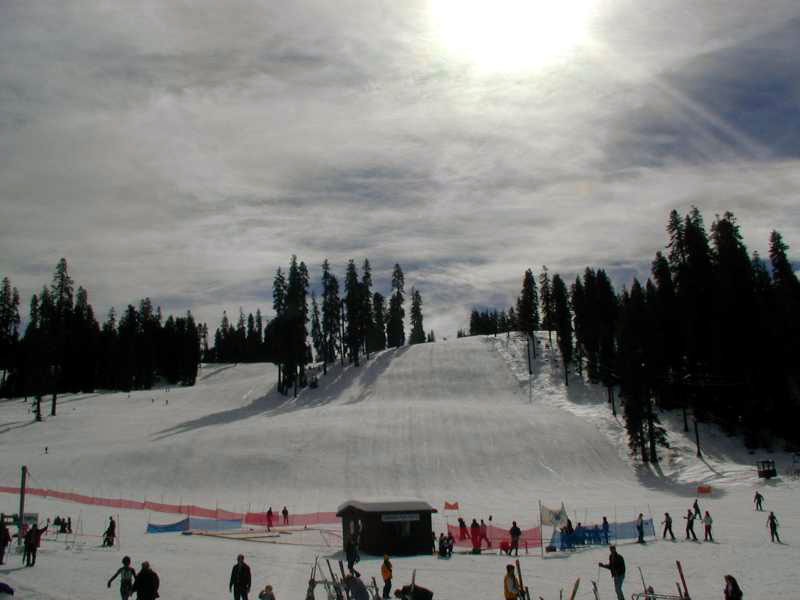
Ski Slopes at Dusk

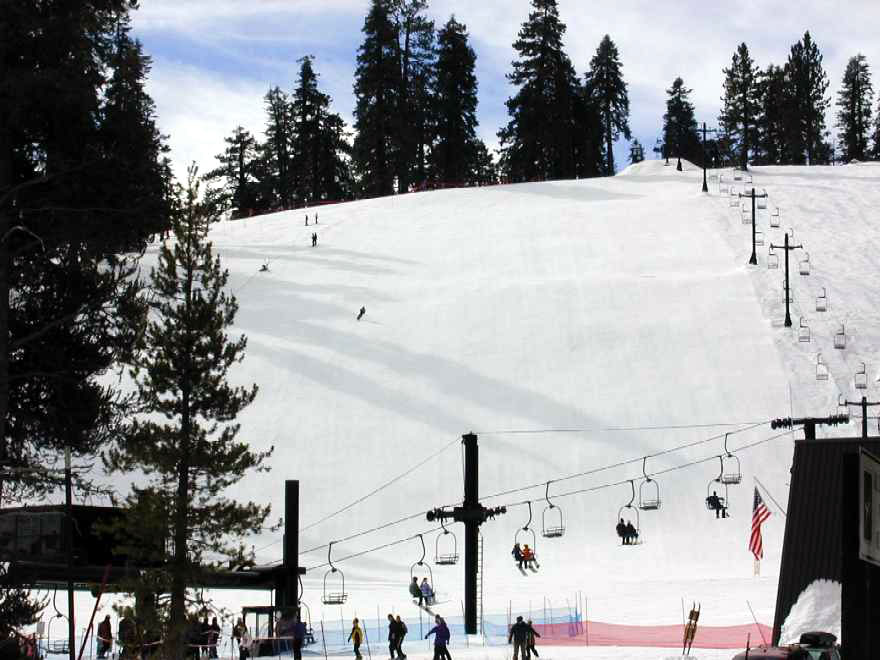
Ski lift to lowest summit

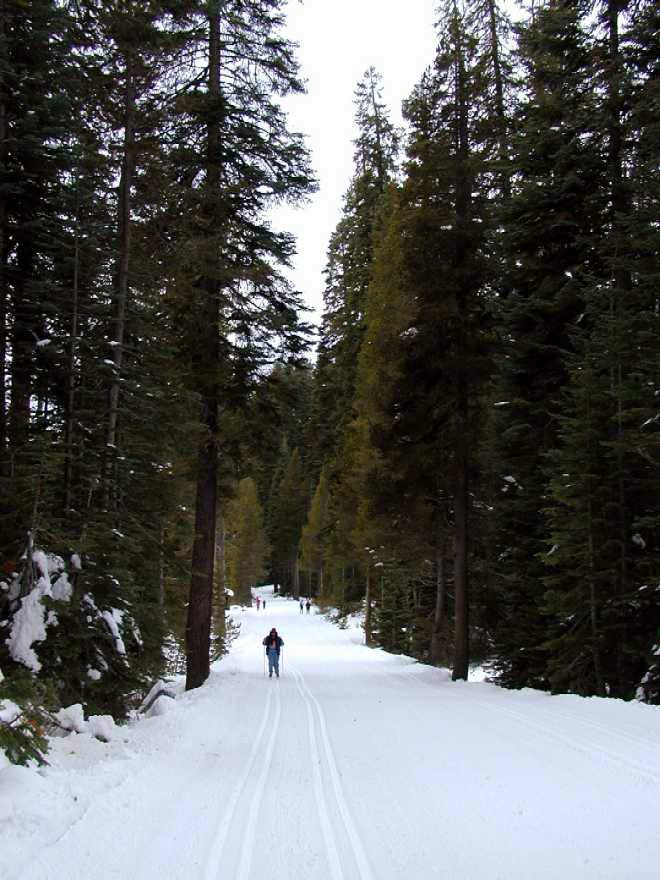
Glacier Point Road

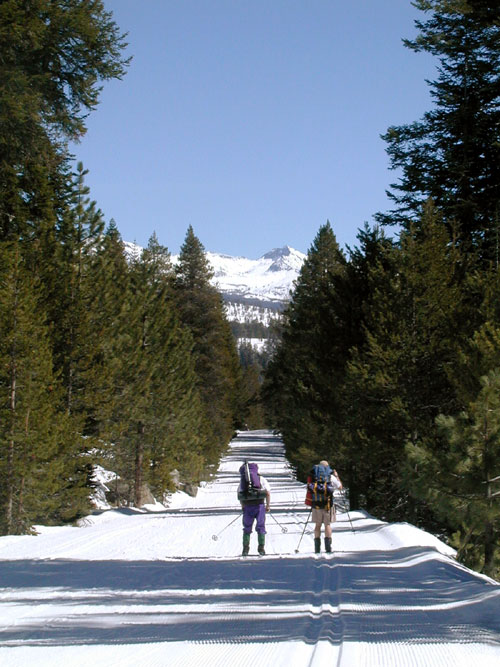
Backpackers on overnight

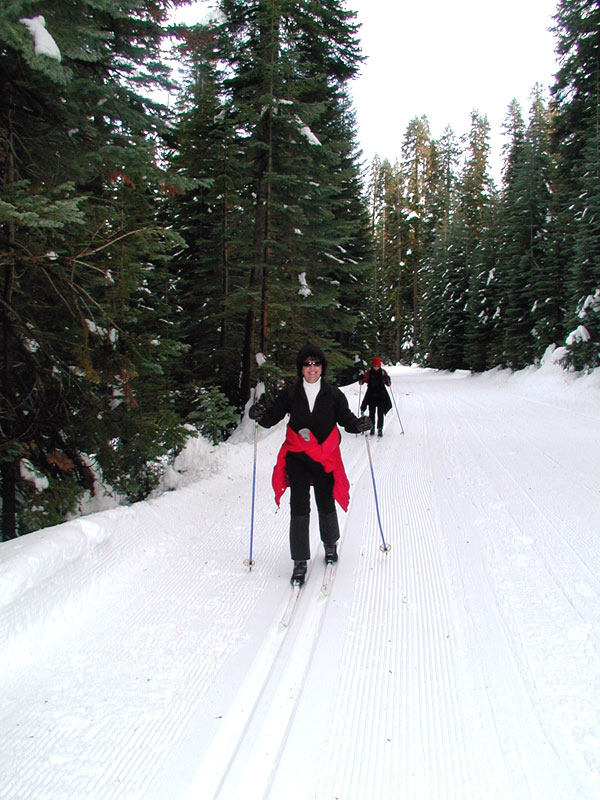
Cross-country skiing

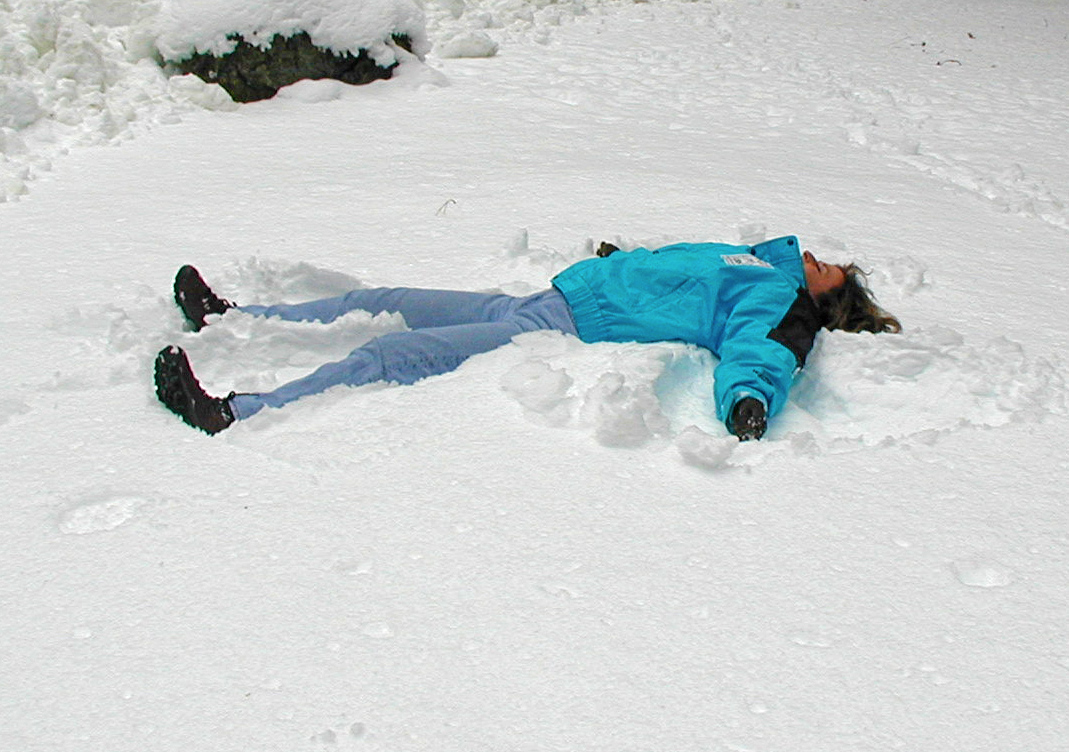
Woman making a snow angel

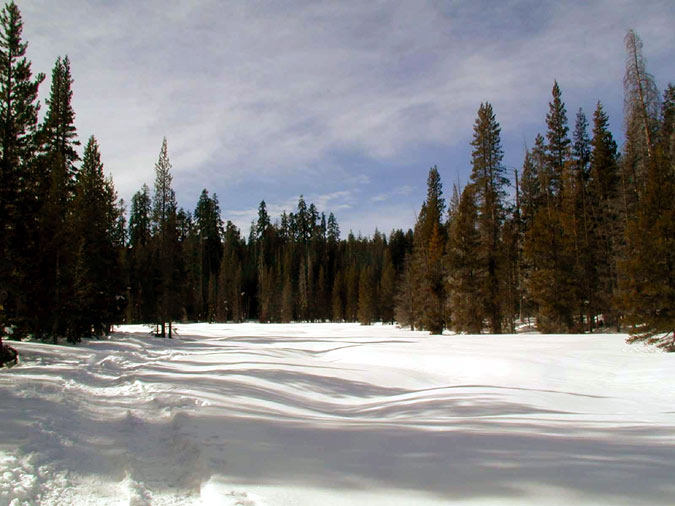
Backcounty snow trail to Dewey Point

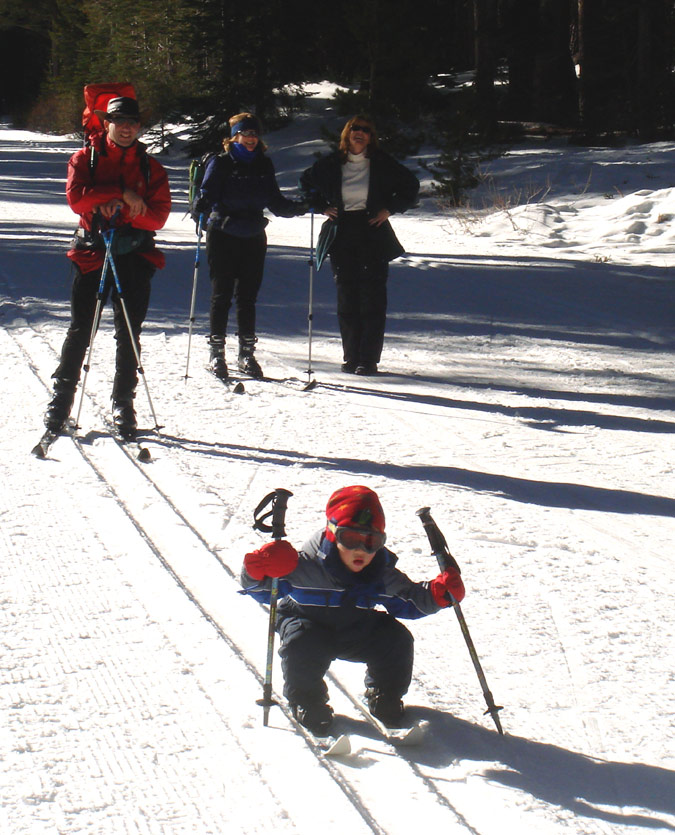
Cross-country skiing near Badger Pass

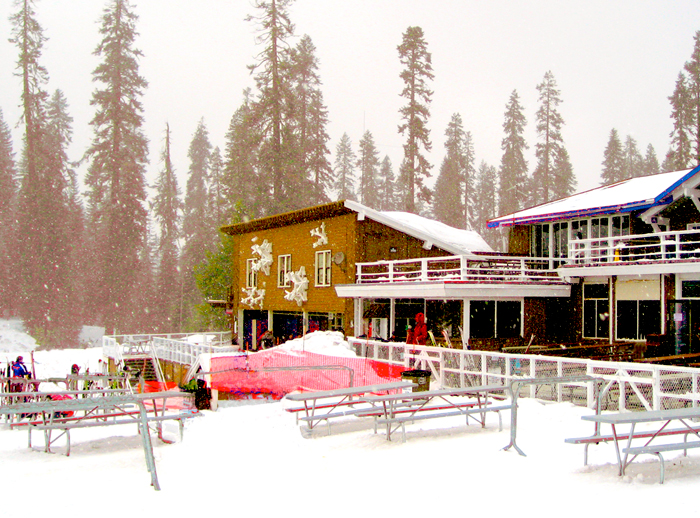
Badger Pass day lodge

== See also ==
- Mariposa County
- History of the Yosemite area
- Chinquapin, California
- Yosemite West
