= Crane Flat Fire Lookout =

Fire lookout in Yosemite National Park, USA

- U.S. National Register of Historic Places
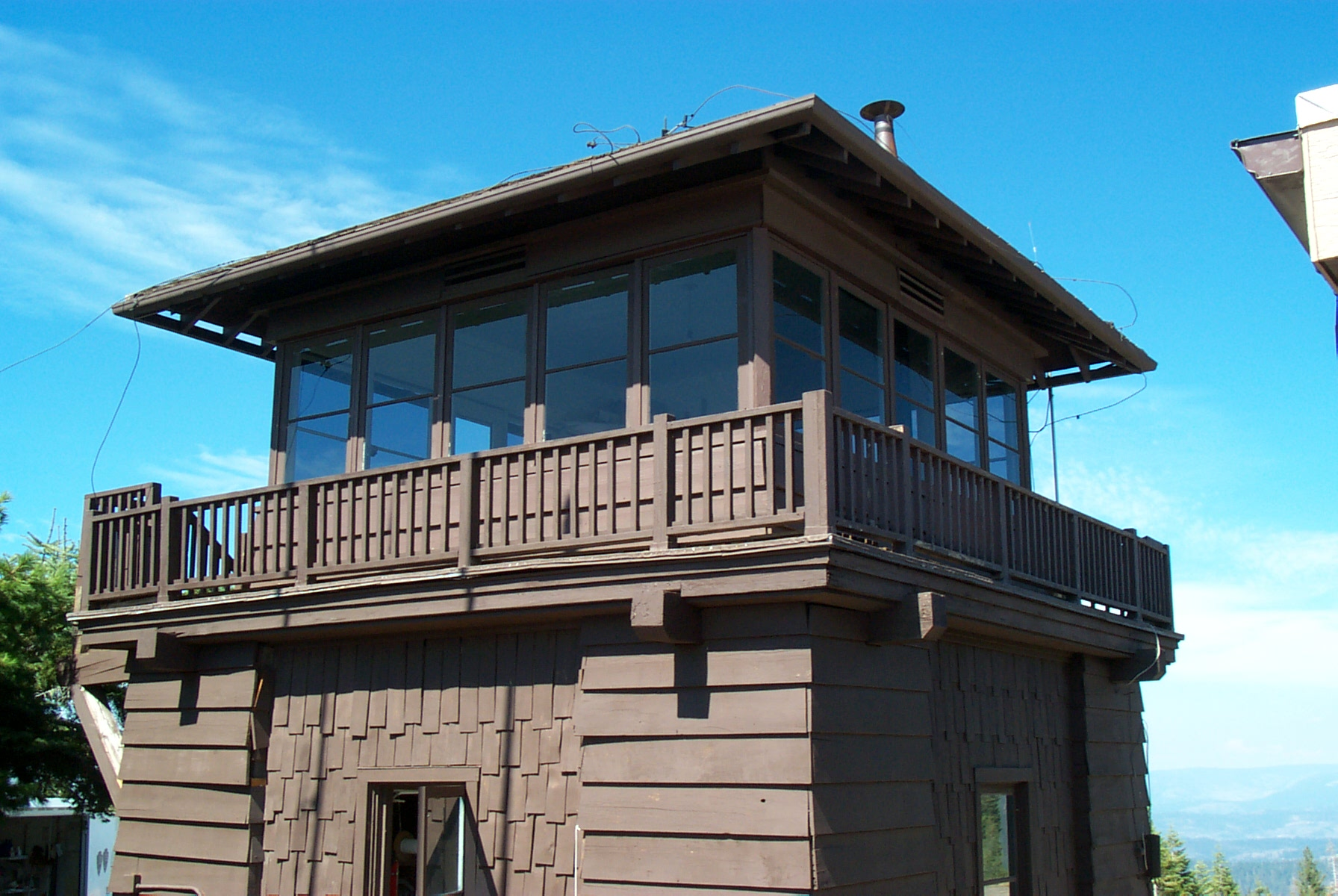

- Location within California Location within the United States
- Nearest city: Aspen Valley, California
- Coordinates: 37°45′35″N 119°49′14″W
- Built: 1931
- Architect: National Park Service Landscape Div.; Wosky, John
- MPS: Historic Park Landscapes in National and State Parks MPS
- NRHP reference No.: 96000354
- Added to NRHP: April 4, 1996

The Crane Flat Fire Lookout in Yosemite National Park was built in 1931. An example of the National Park Service Rustic style, the lookout is a two-story structure with a lower storage or garage level and an upper observation level, with an overhanging roof. Design work was carried out by the National Park Service Landscape Division.

The lookout was the first in Yosemite, and was still in use in the 1980s. It was designed in the National Park Service Rustic style, and is one of only four similar structures in California, with the Henness Ridge Fire Lookout being the only other in Yosemite. These lookouts were specifically designed to blend with their surroundings, in contrast to the metal towers used by the U.S. Forest Service. The Crane Flat lookout was included in an influential portfolio of park structures assembled by Thomas Chalmers Vint, chief landscape architect of the National Park Service, to be used as prototypes for general use.

== See also ==
- National Register of Historic Places listings in Yosemite National Park
- Architects of the National Park Service
- National Register of Historic Places listings in Mariposa County, California
