= Chinquapin, California =

Former settlement in California, United States

Coordinates: 37°39′00″N 119°42′19″W

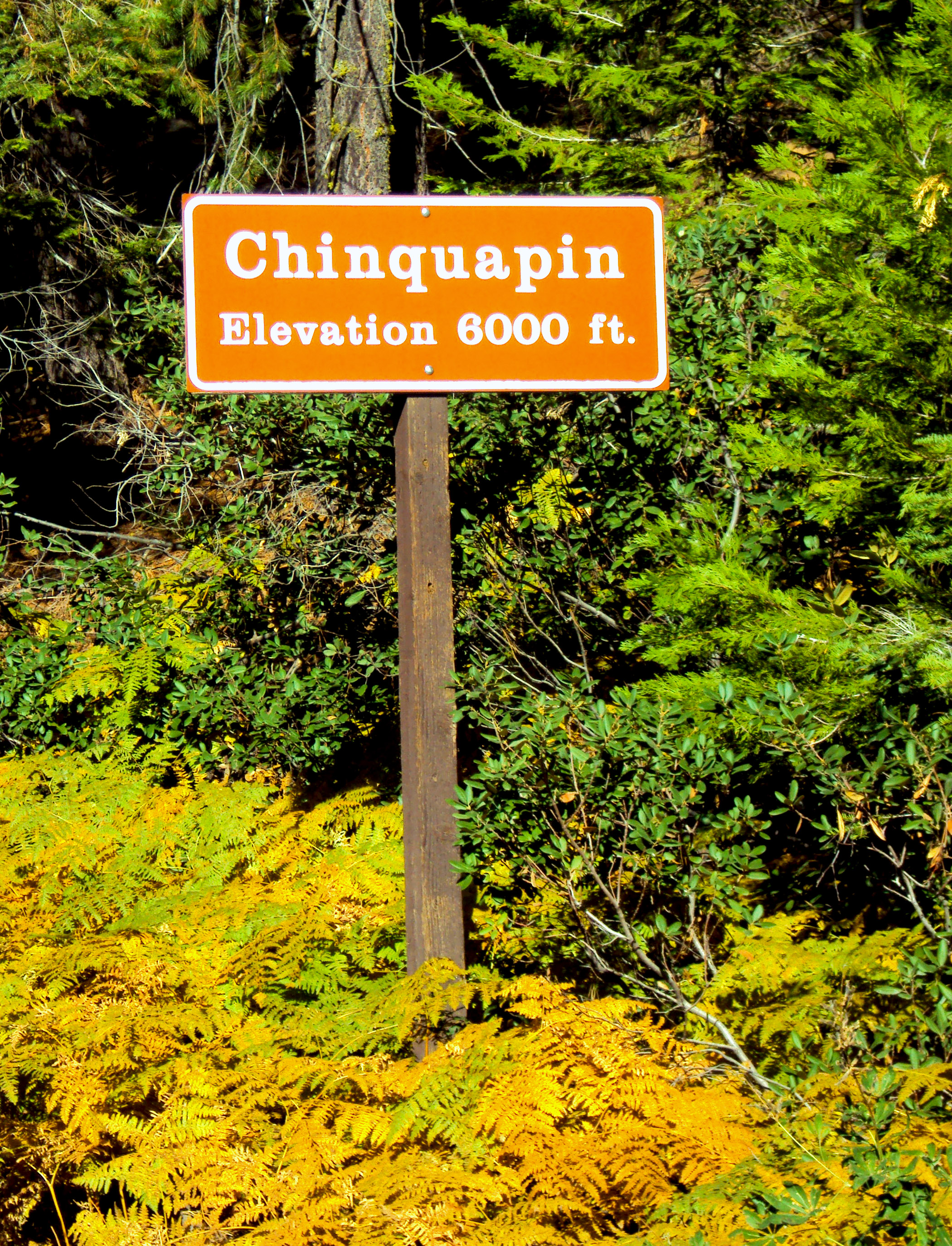
Chinquapin, elevation 6000 ft, is at the intersection of Glacier Point and Wawona roads

Chinquapin (also, Chincapin and Chinkapin) is a former settlement in Mariposa County, California, United States. It was located 8.5 miles (14 km) north-northwest of Wawona. It is located within Yosemite National Park, adjacent to the community of Yosemite West. Chinquapin is the midway point between Yosemite Valley and Wawona, a community inside the park.

== History ==
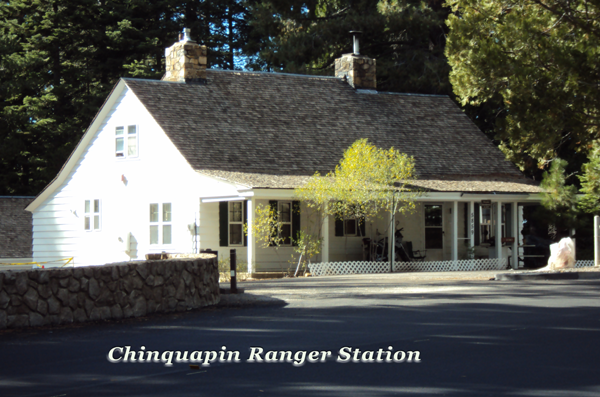
Chinquapin Ranger Station

Chinquapin was built as a junction of the Old Glacier Point Road, which was built in 1882. Previously it was a bridle trail to Glacier Point (the current Glacier Point Road, which starts immediately north of the old road was built in 1940). On an 1896 U.S. Cavalry map it is marked as "Chinquapin Station"

It was named Chinquapin after Chinquapin Creek, located immediately northwest of Chinquapin, now known as Indian Creek. The name 'Chinquapin' originates from the Sierra Chinquapin brush (Chrysolepis sempervirens), noted for its spiny seeds, which grows in the area.

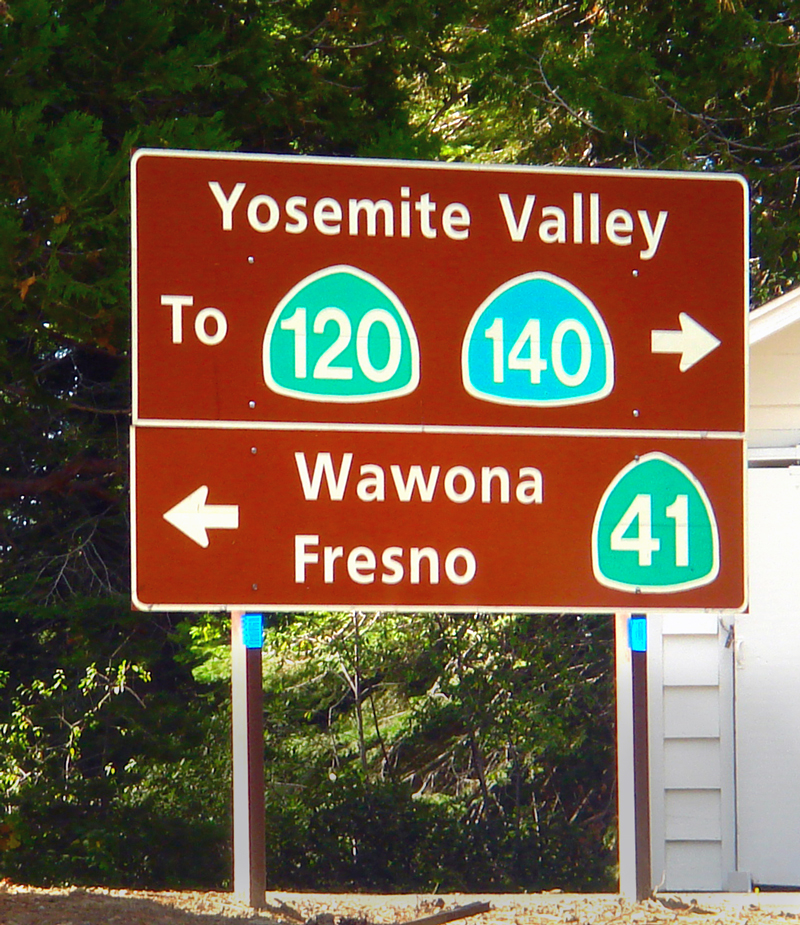
Direction sign at Chinquapin in Yosemite National Park

Chinquapin was Yosemite's second ski area, opening after the construction of the Wawona Tunnel, which enabled winter access. Initially, skiing took place on a glacial moraine east of the horse stables near the Pines Campgrounds in Yosemite Valley. Later, the ski operations moved from Chinquapin to Badger Pass along the Old Glacier Point Road. Today, the ski area is located in Simpson Meadow, below Badger Pass.

Between 1933 and 1938, Chinquapin underwent significant development. During these years, several key buildings and structures were designed and constructed, which are now recognized for their cultural and historical value. This includes the establishment of infrastructure such as the Ranger Station and Garage, both completed in 1934, as well as the Comfort Station built in 1933 and a Redwood Water Tank erected in 1936. These constructions contributed to transforming Chinquapin into a developed area that supported park operations and enhanced visitor experiences.

A gas station opened in Chinquapin in 1922 and operated until the 1990s. Delaware North, the park concessionaire, cleaned up the site as part of its environmental obligations after taking over the park concession in 1993 from the previous concessionaire, MCA Corporation.

== Badger Pass and Chinquapin ==
Skiing activities at Chinquapin have largely ceased, especially following the closure of its gas station and store. Today, Chinquapin primarily serves as a rest stop. In the winter months, Chinquapin serves as a checkpoint for tire chain installation en route to Badger Pass Ski Area. Rangers and other staff assist visitors with chain installation during snowy conditions. If weather conditions become too hazardous, or if Badger Pass is at full parking capacity, rangers will close Glacier Point Road at the Chinquapin intersection to all ascending traffic.

== Trailheads near Chinquapin ==
The Deer Camp trailhead is just south of Chinquapin and Glacier Point Road. As you hike along the trail above Hwy 41, it passes over Rail Creek and Strawberry Creek on its way to Deer Camp on Empire Meadow. The trail's endpoint is at the town of Wawona.

The Old Glacier Point Trail begins at Chinquapin and is the only other trail in the vicinity of the site. It begins about 100 feet behind the bathroom facility, behind the old water tank in Chinquapin. As the name suggests it is the former road and leads northeast. On several trail maps, this trail is marked #7.

“This reconstruction of the bridle trail from Chinquapin to Glacier Point as a 16-foot wide wagon road, allowed vehicle access to Glacier Point. In 2000, it was found to eligible for the National Register of Historic Places under Criteria A, B and C by Nave (2000) as indicated in Sandy and DuBarton (2007). In addition, Nave recommended that the remaining intact portions of the Old Glacier Point Road be recorded and added and that the entire route be nominated as the Old Glacier Point Road Historic District.”

== See also ==
- Henness Ridge Fire Lookout
- History of the Yosemite area
