= Mariposa Grove Museum =

Historic log cabin and museum in Yosemite National Park, California.

- U.S. National Register of Historic Places
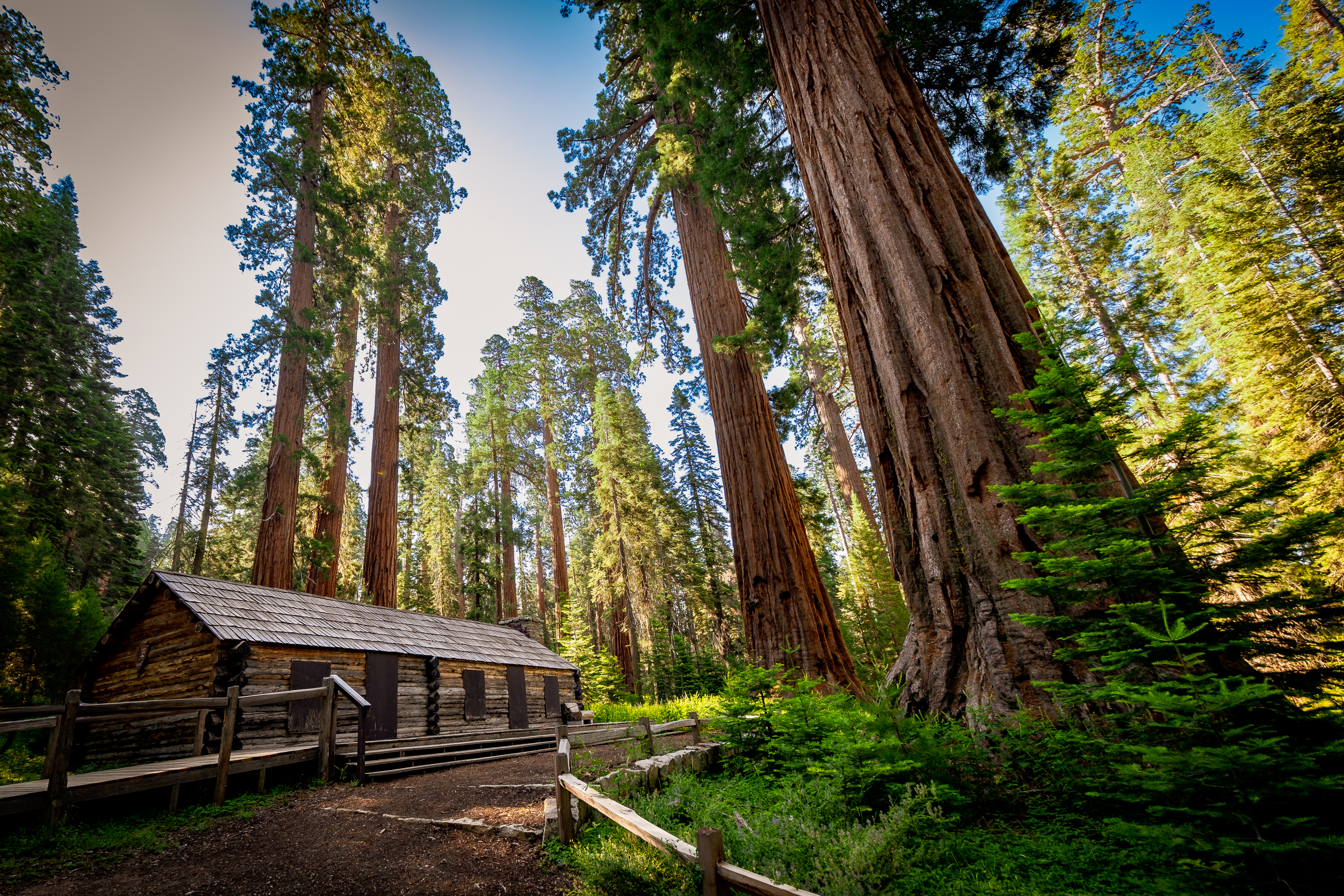
- The Mariposa Grove Museum

- Location within California
- Nearest city: Wawona, California
- Coordinates: 37°30′50″N 119°35′54″W
- Area: 1 acre (0.40 ha)
- Built: 1930
- Architect: National Park Service
- Architectural style: Rustic
- NRHP reference No.: 78000381
- Added to NRHP: December 1, 1978

Mariposa Grove Museum is an historic log cabin in the Mariposa Grove of Yosemite National Park. Galen Clark, the first guardian of the Yosemite Valley and Mariposa Big Tree Grant, built the first cabin on approximately the same site in May 1864 as an office and information center for visitors.

The State of California replaced Clark's original cabin with a new one-room structure in 1881, and a second room was added in 1902. The present building was constructed by the National Park Service in 1930 after the earlier cabin had deteriorated. Although similar in size and form to its predecessor, it was not intended as an exact reconstruction. The building was designed in the Rustic style, with minor Art Deco elements in its interior furnishings.

The Mariposa Grove Museum was listed on the National Register of Historic Places in 1978.

== Galen Clark cabin ==
Galen Clark built the first shelter in the Upper Grove in May 1864. The one-room cabin served as an office and information center for visitors to the Mariposa Grove. In June 1864, Henry W. Bellows named the cabin "Galen's Hospice" after his party took shelter there during a storm.

In 1881, the State of California replaced the original structure with a new one-room cabin for visitors. A second room was added in 1902 for use as the grove guardian's office.

The cabin remained part of the visitor route through the Mariposa Grove. In 1915, Yosemite Stage and Turnpike Company stages stopped there for lunch during trips from Wawona, with passengers eating box lunches prepared at the Wawona Hotel.

A proposal to remove the cabin in 1917 to make way for a hotel drew opposition. The California Legislature adopted a resolution calling for the cabin's preservation.

By the 1920s, National Park Service reports described the cabin as deteriorating while noting its appearance in photographs and postcards. In 1930, the Park Service replaced the unstable building with the present Mariposa Grove Museum.

== Mariposa Grove Museum ==
In 1930, the National Park Service replaced the deteriorating cabin with the present Mariposa Grove Museum. The museum continued the site's earlier use as an information center, with exhibits devoted to the natural history of the giant sequoia.

The museum is a one-story log building approximately 20 feet (6.1 m) by 45 feet (14 m). It is constructed of peeled sugar pine logs with a low-pitched, wood-shingled gable roof. A plank deck extends along the southwest side, and a granite rubble-masonry chimney stands at the southeast end.

The interior includes a granite fireplace, oak flooring, and handcrafted furniture made from sequoia wood. The tables and benches feature stylized Native American motifs with an Art Deco influence. The building and its furnishings were designed to harmonize with the surrounding grove, and the furniture was made from a fallen sequoia from the lower grove.

The museum was listed on the National Register of Historic Places in 1978. It was rebuilt in 1980.

== Ecological research ==
In the mid-20th century, ecologist Richard Hartesveldt rephotographed the Galen Clark cabin and Mariposa Grove from locations shown in earlier photographs. Comparing the photographs showed that white fir and other vegetation had become denser around the giant sequoias.

Hartesveldt later studied the effects of fire suppression on giant sequoia groves. His research found that the exclusion of fire increased the number of white fir and other shade-tolerant trees and allowed forest fuels to accumulate. Fire also exposed mineral soil and opened the forest canopy, conditions that favored sequoia seedlings. Hartesveldt's work was part of the research that provided a scientific basis for prescribed fire programs in giant sequoia groves.

== Gallery ==
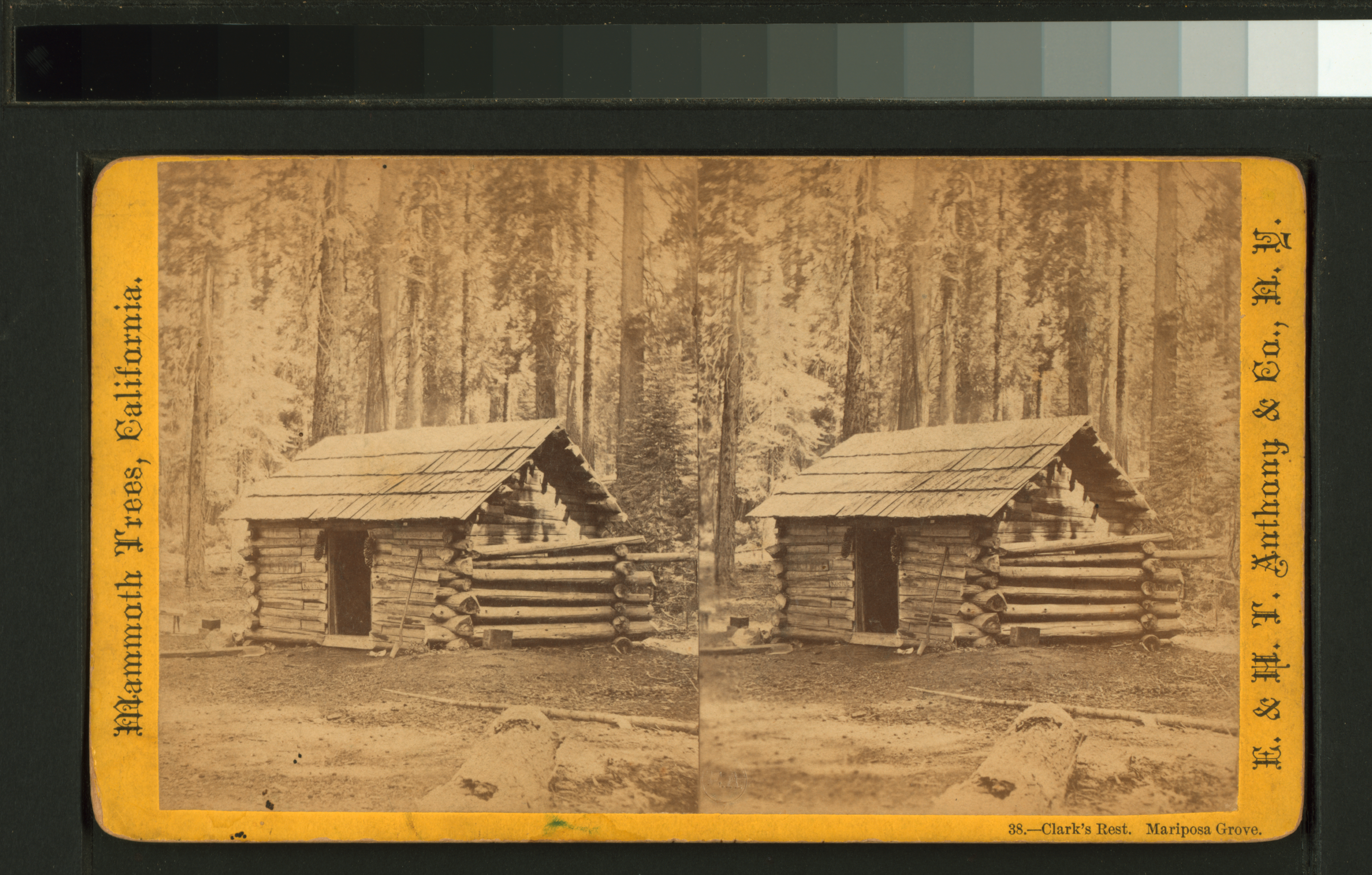
Clark's one room cabin.

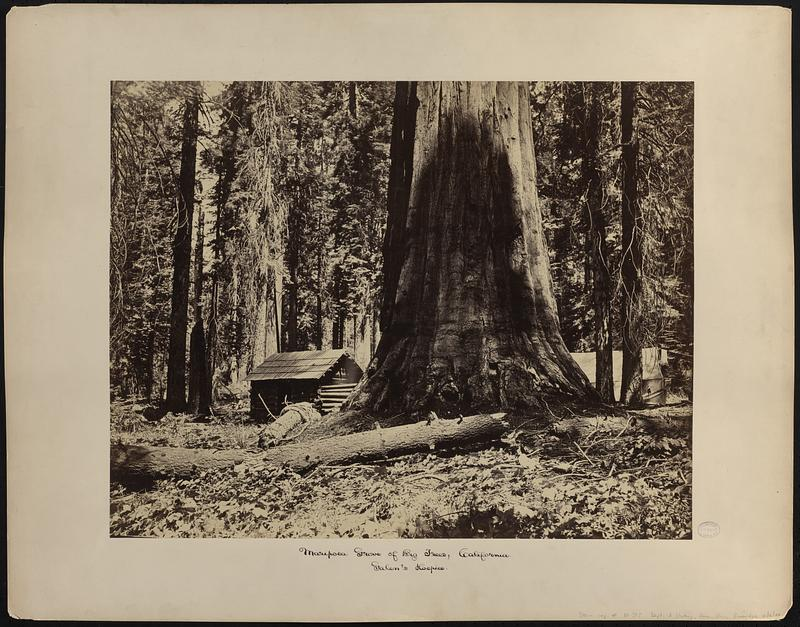
Galen's Hospice photographed by Carleton Watkins

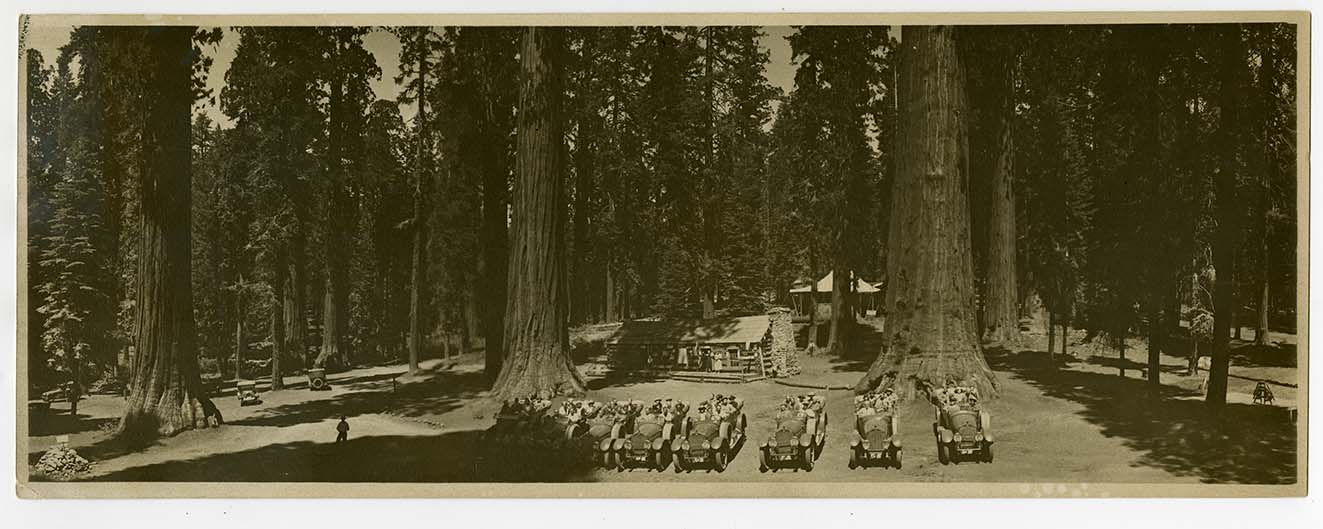
Autos in front of Clark's Station.
