= Wawona =

Wawona may refer to:

- Wawona (schooner), a historic schooner in Seattle, Washington, USA, now disassembled
- Wawona, California, an unincorporated town within Yosemite National Park, USA
- Wawona Hotel, in Yosemite National Park
- Wawona Tree, a giant sequoia in Yosemite National Park
- Camp Wawona, a summer camp in Yosemite National Park
- Wawona Clubhouse, home of Project Insight in Sigmund Stern Recreation Grove, San Francisco, California

== See also ==
- North Wawona, California
- South Wawona, California
