= Fort Monroe (Yosemite) =

Historic site in Yosemite National Park

Coordinates: 37.71124°N 119.69529°W

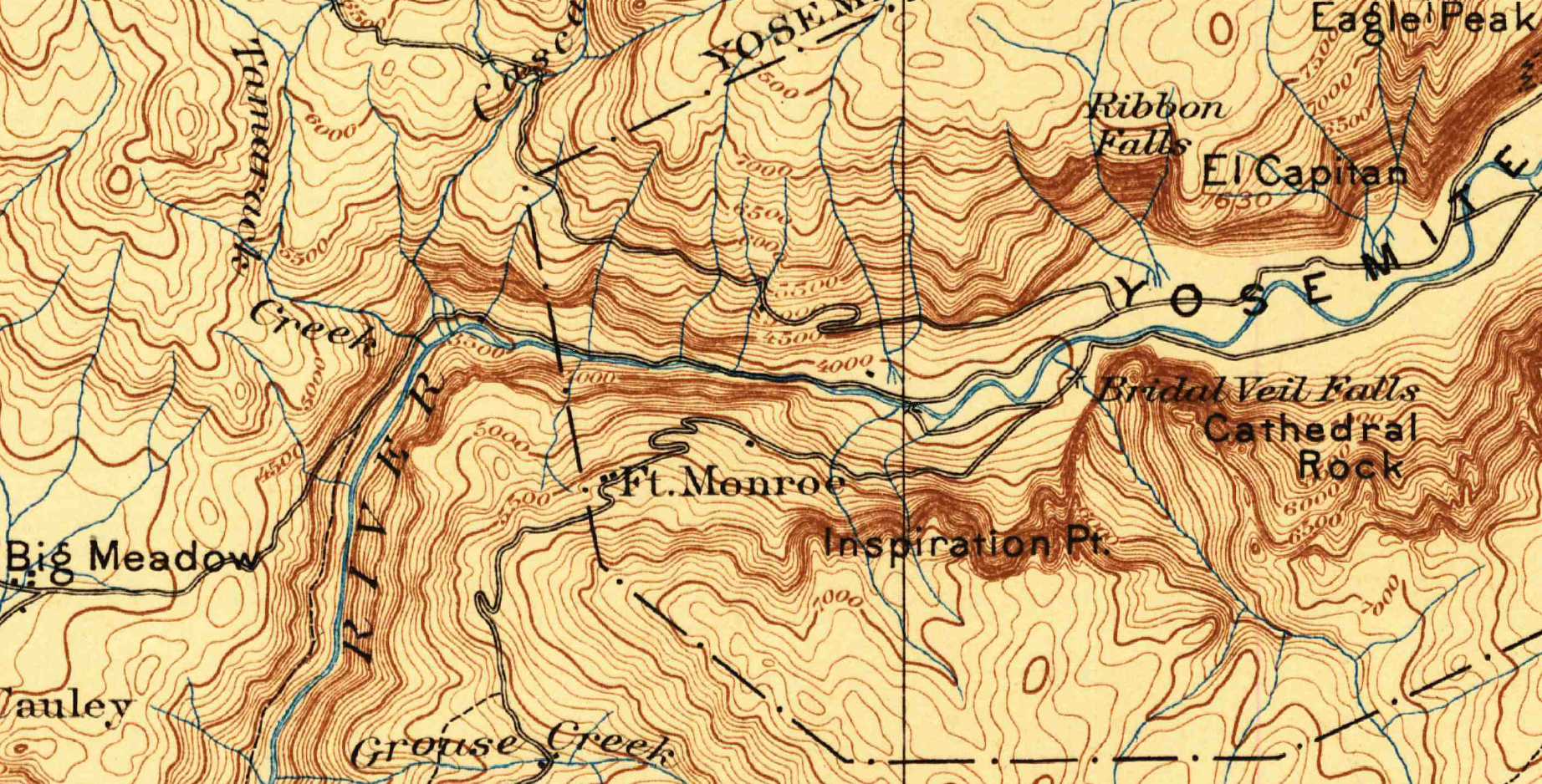
Close up of 1897 USGS map of Yosemite showing location of Fort Monroe.

Fort Monroe is a historic site in Yosemite National Park on the former Wawona Road near the south rim of Yosemite Valley. Despite its name, it was not a military fort but a stage station on the route between Wawona and Yosemite Valley. It was named for George F. Monroe, a guide and stage driver. Fort Monroe remained in use into the automobile era and was a junction with the Pohono Trail. No structures survive; the site is now a small clearing east of the modern Wawona Road.

== History ==
The old Wawona Road was completed in 1875 as a toll road between Wawona and Yosemite Valley. Chinese laborers built much of the route from camps at Alder Creek and Yosemite Valley.

Henry Washburn incorporated the Yosemite Stage and Turnpike Company in 1877. The company maintained stations along the route. Fort Monroe was one of several spaced at roughly four-mile intervals. Each had water, stables, a corral, and a cabin for the station keeper.

In 1886, California purchased the seven-mile section between Fort Monroe and Yosemite Valley. The Washburn company retained the road to the south and continued to collect tolls. The road reopened to automobiles in 1914. The company still controlled the route as far north as Fort Monroe, while the federal government maintained the descent into Yosemite Valley. In 1917, the Yosemite Stage and Turnpike Company transferred the Wawona–Fort Monroe toll road and the Glacier Point branch to the federal government. Tolls ended, and the National Park Service assumed responsibility for the route.

== George Monroe ==
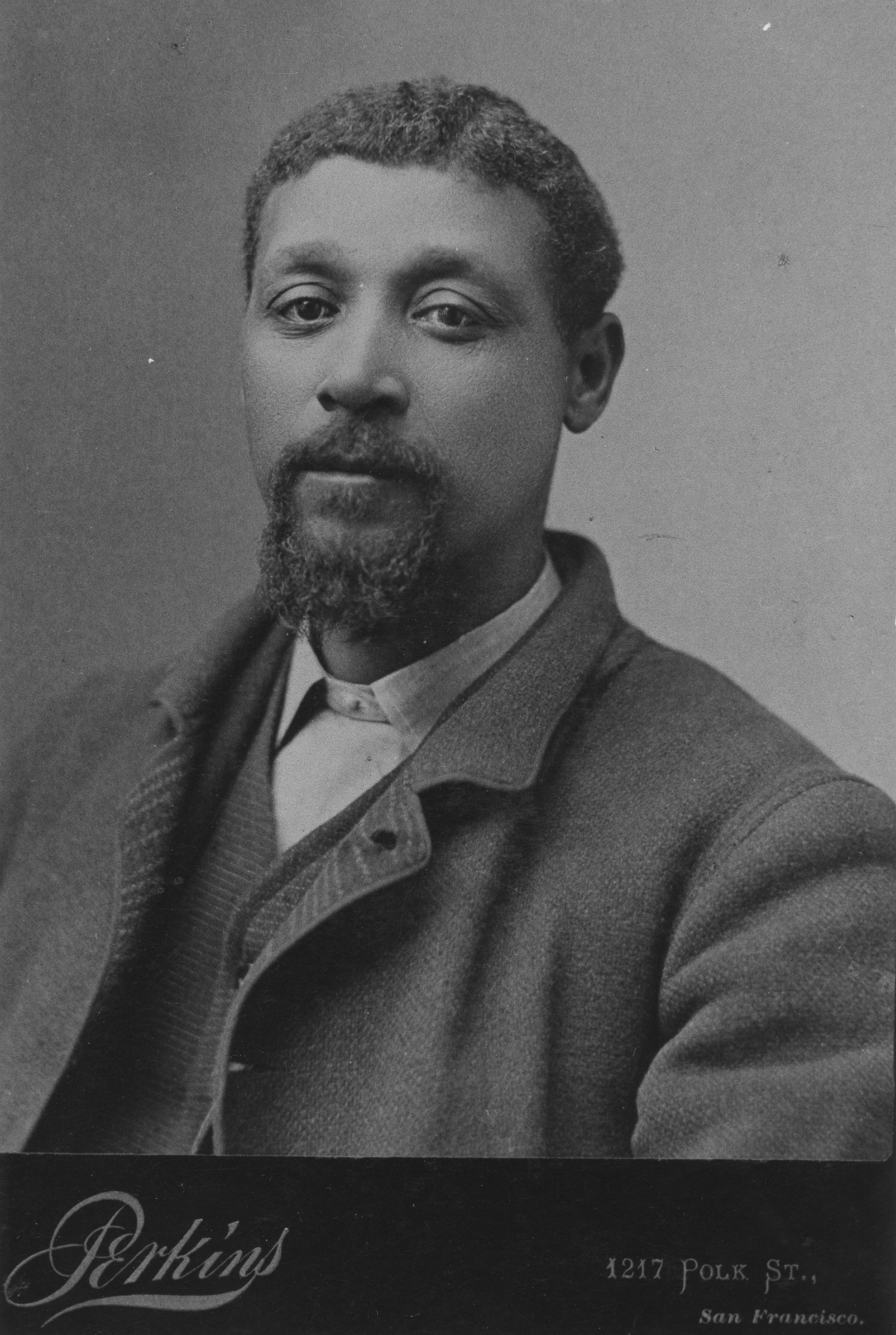
George F. Monroe.

Fort Monroe was named for George F. Monroe, a Black guide and stage driver for A. H. Washburn & Co., whose transportation business became the Yosemite Stage and Turnpike Company.

Monroe grew up in Mariposa, California, after his family moved to California during the Gold Rush. By the late 1860s he was working for A. H. Washburn & Co. as a Yosemite guide and stage driver. He drove routes connecting Merced, Mariposa, Wawona, and Yosemite Valley.

Monroe became known for his skill on Yosemite's steep mountain roads. Travelers often requested him as their driver, and his employers said he never injured a passenger or damaged company property. His passengers included Ulysses S. Grant, Rutherford B. Hayes, and James A. Garfield.

On November 15, 1886, Monroe was riding as a passenger when the stage team bolted. He helped bring the runaway horses under control but was injured when the stage overturned. California State Parks attributes his death to injuries from the accident. Monroe died at his family's ranch near Mariposa on November 22.

== Later use of the "fort" ==
The location retained Monroe's name after his death. By 1920, Fort Monroe served as an entrance station and automobile camp. After the Wawona Tunnel was built, the upper road became part of the Pohono Trail, whose trailhead is now at the Tunnel View parking lot.

== Monroe Meadows ==
Monroe Meadows, along Glacier Point Road at the base of Badger Pass Ski Area, was also named for George Monroe. The Badger Pass ski area was developed at the site in the 1930s, with the ski lodge opening in 1935.
