= Chilnualna Falls =

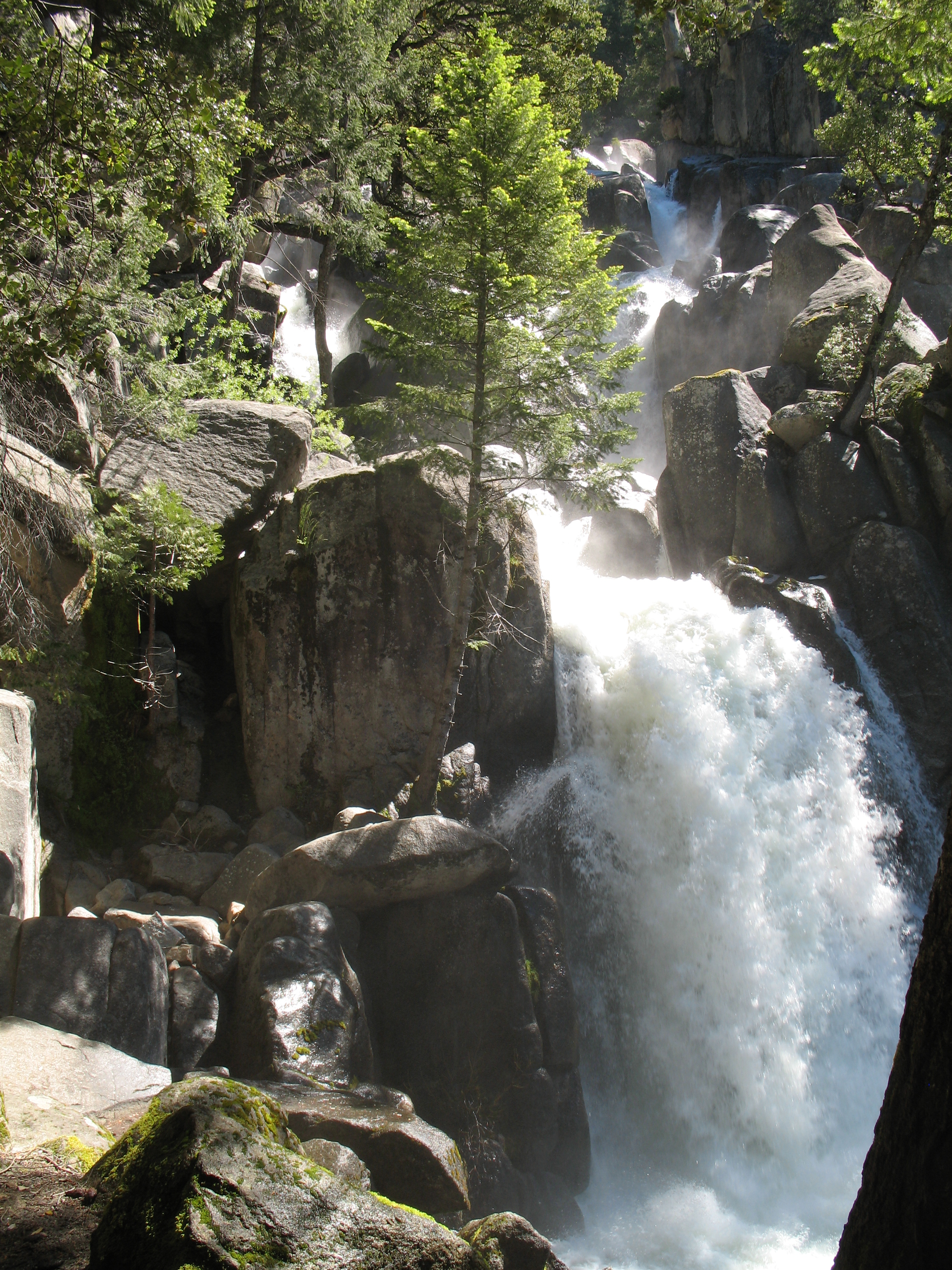
- July 2006
- Interactive map of Chilnualna Falls
- Location: Yosemite National Park, California, United States
- Coordinates: 37°33′48″N 119°37′05″W
- Type: Tiered
- Total height: 695 ft (212 m)
- Number of drops: 5
- Longest drop: 240 ft (73 m)
- World height ranking: 380

Chilnualna Falls is a series of waterfalls totaling 690 feet (210 m), located on Chilnualna Creek in the southern section of Yosemite National Park.

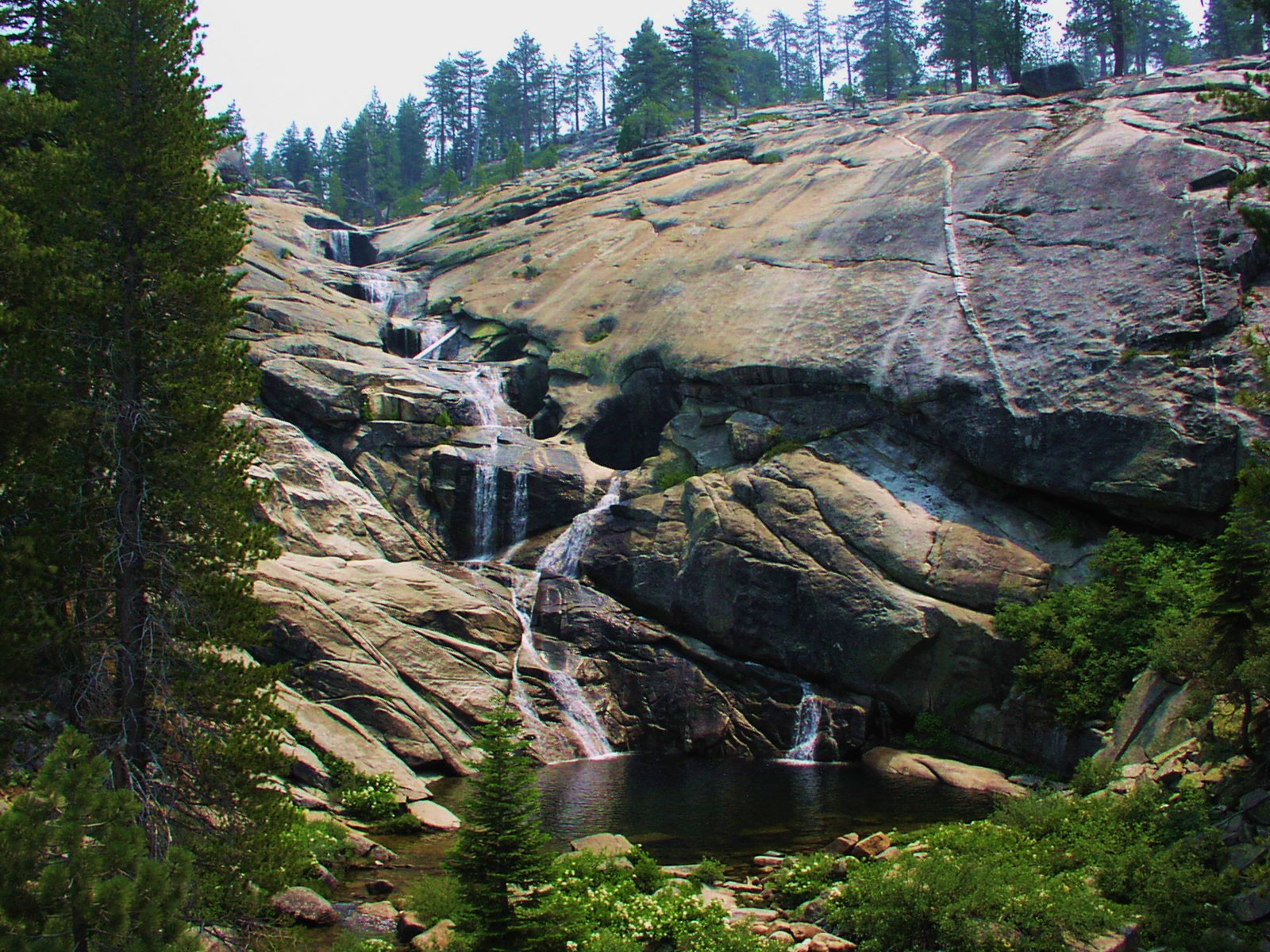
Pool along the course of Upper Chilnualna Falls.

The origin of the name is uncertain. Shirley Sargent recorded two explanations: that Chilnualna was Paiute for “leaping waters,” and, according to a Wawona resident, that it meant “many rocks.”

The falls are a popular horseback riding destination. Chilnualna Falls consists of five tiers ranging from 30 to 300 feet (9–91 m) in height. The first tier is 90–120 feet (27–36 m) high. The second is a 30-foot (9 m) high cascade. The third and largest is 300 feet (91 m) high. The fourth is 60 feet (18 m) high. The final tier is a 180–210 foot (54–64 m) high cascade. The trailhead to the falls is in the northeastern portion of Wawona, at the end of the paved portion of Chilnualna Falls Road. The trailhead elevation is approximately 4,000 feet (1,200 m), and the trail reaches the main portion of the waterfall at 6,200 feet (1,900 m).

== See also ==
- List of waterfalls
- List of waterfalls in California
