= Yosemite Stage and Turnpike Company =

American stagecoach and hospitality company

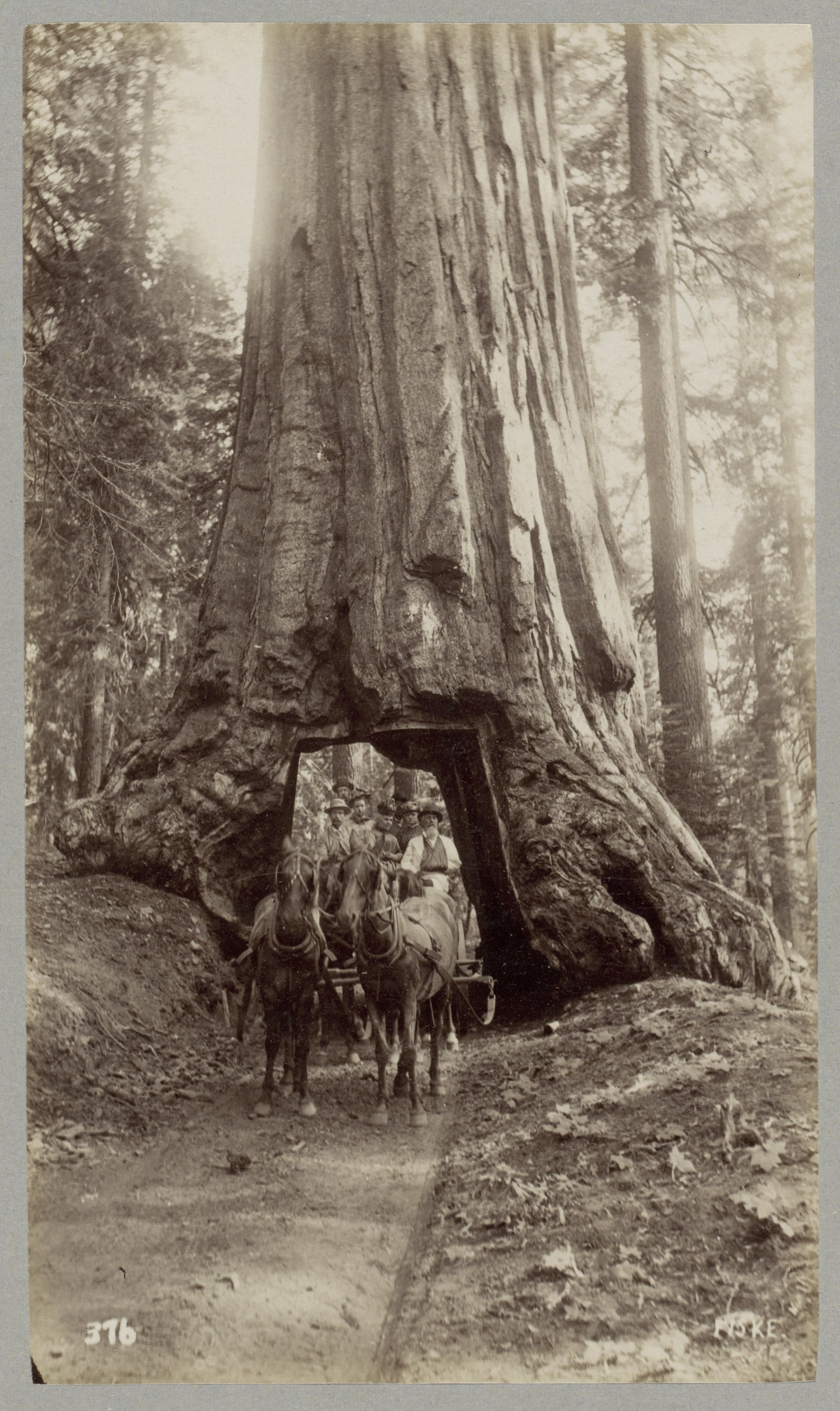
- The Wawona Tree, a giant sequoia tunnel tree created by the Yosemite Stage and Turnpike Company in 1881 as a tourist attraction.
- Type: Private
- Industry: Hospitality management
- Founded: 1877
- Founder: Edward, John, and Henry Washburn
- Headquarters: Wawona, California, U.S.
- Area served: Yosemite National Park, Madera County, Mariposa County
- Services: Stagecoach Transportation; Toll Road Operation

Yosemite Stage and Turnpike Company was a stagecoach company incorporated in 1877 by Henry Washburn. The company carried passengers and freight between Merced, Wawona, Yosemite Valley, Glacier Point, the Mariposa Grove, and other destinations in the Yosemite region.

During the summer, the company operated as many as eleven stages a day to Wawona. It employed up to 40 stage drivers and kept approximately 700 horses. Wawona was the largest stage stop in Yosemite, with inbound stages stopping overnight at the Wawona Hotel before continuing to Yosemite Valley.

== History ==
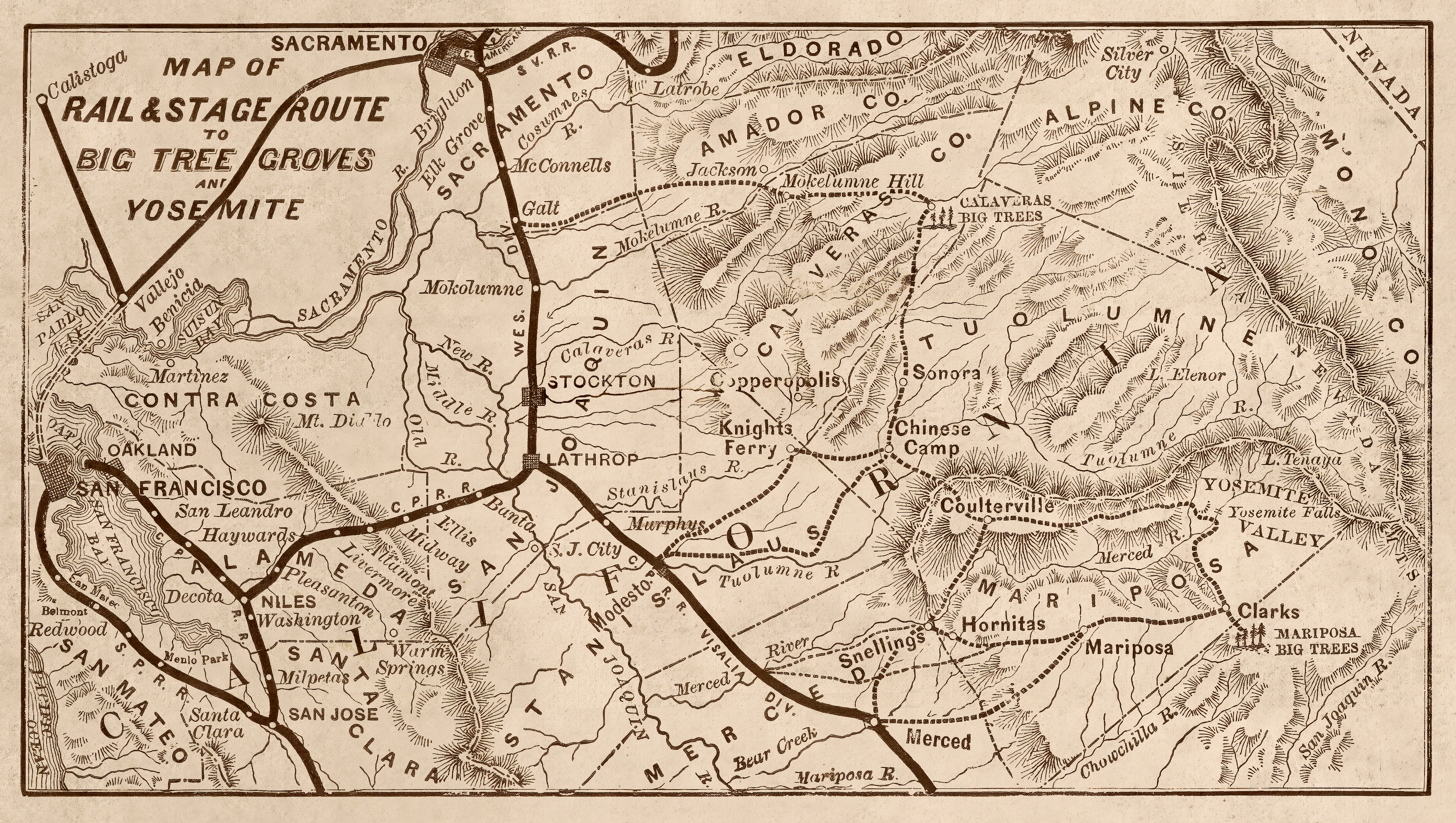
Yosemite stage routes, 1870s.

Before wagon roads reached Yosemite Valley, visitors traveled by foot or horseback over mountain trails. Between 1874 and 1875, three privately developed toll roads opened into the valley: the Coulterville Road, the Big Oak Flat Road, and the Wawona Road. The Coulterville & Yosemite Turnpike reached Yosemite Valley in June 1874, followed by the Big Oak Flat Road about a month later.

In 1875, Henry Washburn and his associates completed the 23-mile Wawona Road between what is now Wawona and Yosemite Valley. Much of the road was built by Chinese immigrant laborers during the winter and spring of 1875.

That year, Galen Clark and his business partner Edwin Moore sold their property at Wawona to Albert Henry Washburn. The property included the main guest house, several lodging buildings, a barn, blacksmith shop, sawmill, bridge, and the Chowchilla Mountain Stage Road. The Washburn family subsequently developed the property into the Wawona Hotel complex.

The Yosemite Stage and Turnpike Company was founded under Henry Washburn in 1877. Wawona became the largest stage stop in Yosemite, with inbound stages stopping overnight at the Wawona Hotel before continuing to Yosemite Valley.

During the summer season, as many as eleven stages a day operated between the Raymond train station, Wawona, Yosemite Valley, Glacier Point, and the Mariposa Grove. The company employed between 20 and 40 drivers, maintained about 40 stagecoaches and buggies, and kept approximately 700 horses.

=== Madera route ===
In 1881, the Yosemite Stage and Turnpike Company opened a road from Madera toward Wawona and Yosemite Valley. The road cost approximately $60,000 to construct and connected the company's stage system with the Southern Pacific Railroad at Madera.

The route ran from Madera through Stitts, Green's Ranch, Coarse Gold Gulch, Fresno Flats, and over Chowchilla Mountain to Wawona, then known as Big Tree Station, before continuing to Yosemite Valley. Big Tree Station served as an overnight stop for stage passengers.

An 1881 account in the Pacific Rural Press described regular stage service over the route, with coaches carrying as many as 14 passengers. Passengers leaving San Francisco traveled by rail to Madera before transferring to the stage for the trip to Yosemite.

=== Shortline railroad connection ===
In 1886, the San Joaquin Valley and Yosemite Railroad opened a 21-mile (34 km) branch from Berenda to Raymond. Raymond became the rail terminus for passengers continuing to Wawona and Yosemite Valley by Yosemite Stage and Turnpike Company stagecoach.

The stage trip from Raymond to Wawona covered 44 miles (71 km) and took about ten hours, including a lunch stop at Ahwahnee. Passengers stayed overnight at the Wawona Hotel before continuing to Yosemite Valley the following day, a journey of approximately six hours.

Stage robberies were an occasional hazard on the Yosemite routes. The Mariposa Gazette recorded six stage robberies between 1883 and 1906. In June 1896, the San Francisco Call reported the robbery of a Yosemite stage.

=== Wawona tunnel tree ===
In 1881, a tunnel was cut through the Wawona Tree, a giant sequoia in the Mariposa Grove, allowing stagecoaches to pass through the tree. The tunnel, approximately 7 feet (2.1 m) wide, 9 feet (2.7 m) high, and 26 feet (7.9 m) long, was created as a tourist attraction. The tree was frequently photographed with stagecoaches passing through it.

The Wawona Road was the most successful of the early toll roads into Yosemite. Between 1882 and 1898, toll receipts from the Wawona road system totaled $221,254.78, compared with construction costs of $76,750 and maintenance costs of $65,636.78.

== Notable people ==
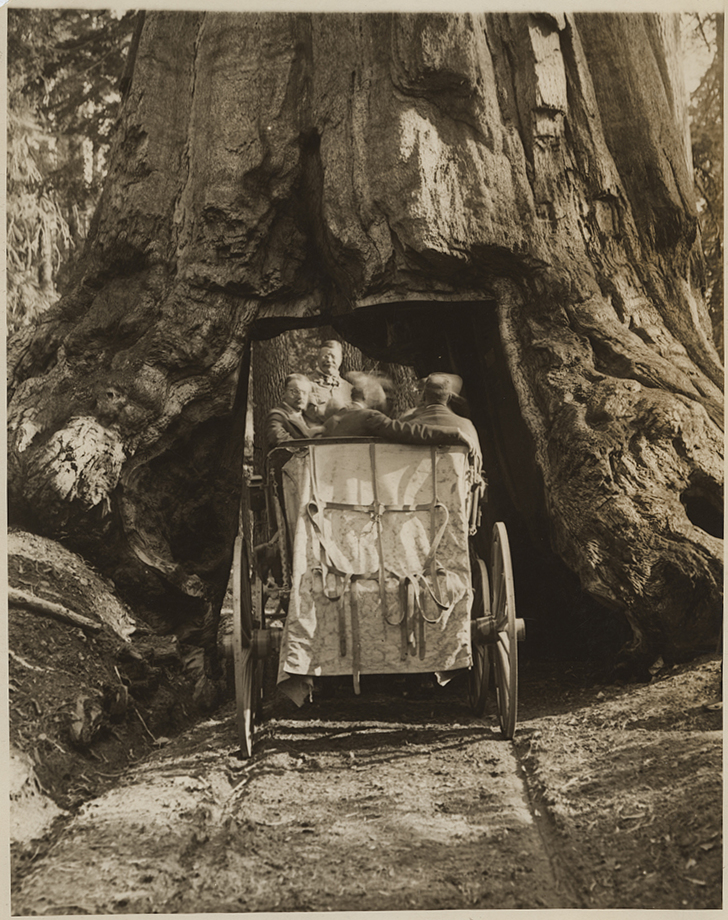
Theodore Roosevelt riding through the Wawona Tree, 1903.

President Rutherford B. Hayes visited Yosemite during his western tour in 1880. Hayes returned to Yosemite in 1883 after leaving office, traveling with a party of twelve and spending a night at the Wawona Hotel.

President Theodore Roosevelt arrived at the Wawona Hotel on May 15, 1903, during his visit to Yosemite with John Muir. Roosevelt traveled through the Mariposa Grove and was photographed riding through the Wawona Tree.

George Monroe, a Black stage driver from Mariposa, began working for Henry Washburn in 1867 and was driving stages by 1869. Among his passengers were Ulysses S. Grant, Rutherford B. Hayes, and James A. Garfield. Fort Monroe, a former stage stop on the Wawona Road, and Monroe Meadows were named for him.

== Decline and transition to automobiles ==
After the Yosemite Valley Railroad opened in 1907, passengers could travel by rail from Merced to El Portal, eliminating the two-day stage journey previously required to reach the park. From El Portal, passengers transferred to horse-drawn stages for the remaining 14 miles (23 km) to Yosemite Valley.

Automobiles were permitted in Yosemite in 1913, although restrictions remained on individual roads. In April 1913, Yosemite Stage and Turnpike Company president John Washburn said that automobiles could use the Wawona Turnpike if the change received the approval of Secretary of the Interior Franklin Knight Lane. The Wawona Road opened to automobiles on August 8, 1914.

In May 1916, driver Stonewall Jackson Ashworth drove the final Washburn stage from Yosemite Valley to Wawona.

In 1917, the company transferred the Wawona Road and its Glacier Point branch to the United States Department of the Interior in exchange for transportation privileges in the park. Private toll collection ended, but the company continued automobile service between Wawona and Yosemite Valley. The service became known as the Horseshoe Route.

== Later history and legacy ==
In 1926, the Yosemite Park and Curry Company bought out the Yosemite Stage and Turnpike Company's transportation business.

In 1932, the federal government purchased 2,665 acres from the Washburn family, including the Wawona Hotel and surrounding property. The acquisition brought the Wawona property under federal ownership as part of Yosemite National Park.

In the winter of 1968–69, the Wawona Tree fell after 88 years as a tunnel tree. The National Park Service attributes its failure to heavy snow, wet soil, and weakening caused by the tunnel cut through its trunk in 1881.

== Gallery ==
Yosemite stagecoach routes, 1875.

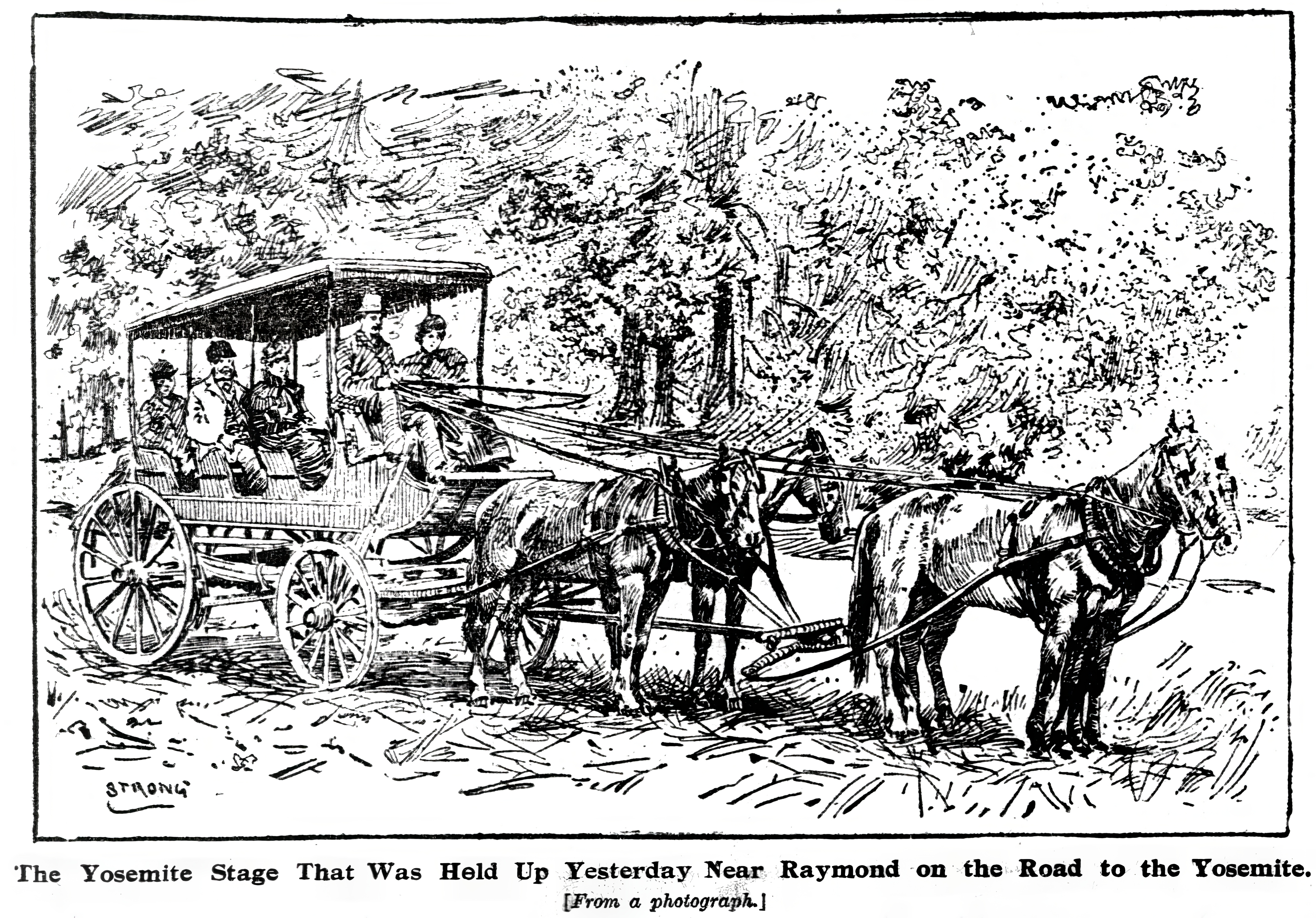
Yosemite stagecoach, 1896.

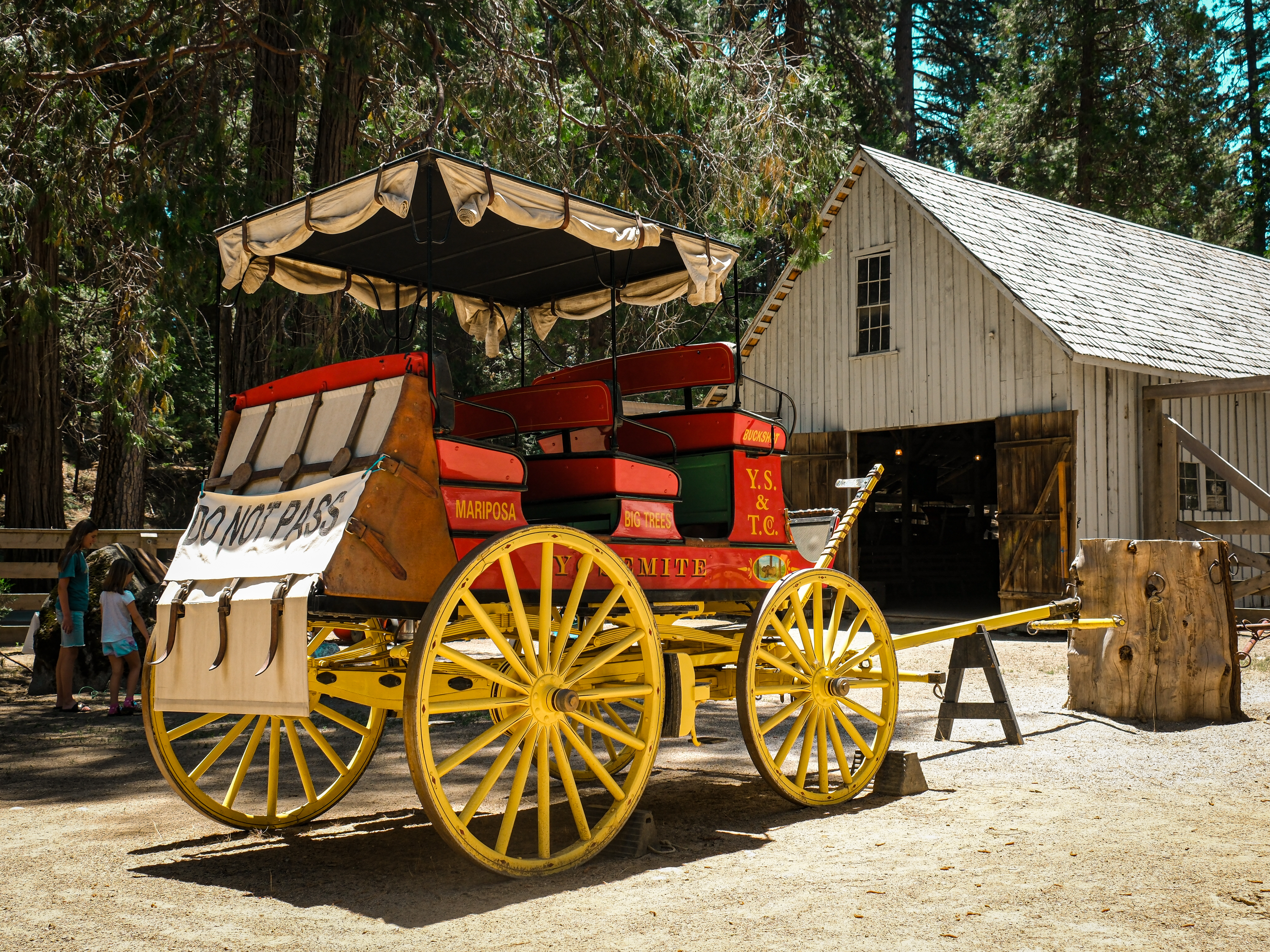
Replica stagecoach displayed at the 1895 Washburn Barn site.

== See also ==
- Yosemite National Park
- Yosemite Park & Curry Company
- Butterfield Overland Mail
