= Shirley Sargent =

American novelist (1927–2004)

- Born: July 12, 1927; Pasadena, California, U.S.
- Died: December 3, 2004 (aged 77); Mariposa, California, U.S.
- Occupations: Historian, novelist

Shirley Sargent (July 12, 1927 – December 3, 2004) was an historian of the Yosemite area in the United States.

Sargent was born in Pasadena, California. Her father was a surveyor who helped rebuild the Tioga Road in Yosemite National Park, starting in 1936. She spent her childhood as a self-described "tomboy" in Yosemite. She had dystonia musculorum deformans, which made her reliant on a wheelchair from age 14. She typed her publications using only one finger, and cycled around on a three-wheeler.

She earned her associate degree from Pasadena City College in 1947 and opened a nursery school in Pasadena.

She also worked as an archivist at the Yosemite Park & Curry Co.

== Writing career ==
Sargent published her first book, Pipeline Down the Valley in 1955.

After writing Wawona's Yesterdays in 1961, she went on to write several other Yosemite History books, focusing on stories about people - making them come alive. Her most authoritative book is Galen Clark: Yosemite Guardian.

Sargent self-published most of her books, with printer and historian Hank Johnson, under the name Flying Spur Press. She later founded her own imprint, Ponderosa Press. Other popular books of hers include Pioneers in Petticoats, John Muir in Yosemite National Park, Yosemite & Its Innkeepers, and Yosemite Chapel 1879-1989.

She also edited James Mason Hutchings' account of his journey across California in 1849.

== Later life ==
In 1961, she bought and built on Theodore Solomons' homesite in Foresta, California, which had only a fireplace surviving from a 1936 fire; she called her new home Flying Spur, but it burned in the 1990 Yosemite A-Rock Fire, which also destroyed her historical papers. She rebuilt her home, but before her death she had to move to her parents' old home in Mariposa, California, due to her illness. She died at her home there.

== Awards ==
- Certificate of Merit of the California Council for the Promotion of History (1990)
- Yosemite Fund Award (1994)

Her papers are held at the Yosemite National Park Archives.

== Selected Books by Shirley Sargent ==
- Pipeline Down The Valley (fiction, 1955)
- Pat Hawly, Pre-school Teacher (fiction, 1958)
- Three Names for Katherine (with Hannah Smith) (fiction, 1960)
- The Heart-Holding Mountains (fiction, 1961)
- Wawona's Yesterdays (1961)
- Stop the Typewriters (fiction, 1963)
- Galen Clark: Yosemite Guardian (1964)
- Treasure at Flying Spur (fiction, 1965)
- Pioneers In Petticoats (1966)
- Ranger in Skirts (fiction, 1966)
- Yosemite Tomboy (fiction, 1967)
- Theodore Parker Lukens, Father of Forestry (1969)
- John Muir in Yosemite National Park (1972)
- Yosemite and Its Innkeeper (1975)
- The Ahwahnee (1977)
- Yosemite's High Sierra Camps (1977)
- The Yosemite Chapel, 1879-1979 (1979)
- Yosemite's Historic Wawona (1979)
- Dear Papa: Letters between John Muir & Wanda (1985)
- Solomons of the Sierra (1989)
- The first hundred years - Yosemite 1890-1990 (1990)
- Enchanted Childhoods, Growing Up in Yosemite (1993)
- Protecting Paradise: Yosemite Rangers, 1898-1960 (1998)
