= Wawona Hotel =

- Wawona Hotel and Thomas Hill Studio
- U.S. National Register of Historic Places
- U.S. National Historic Landmark
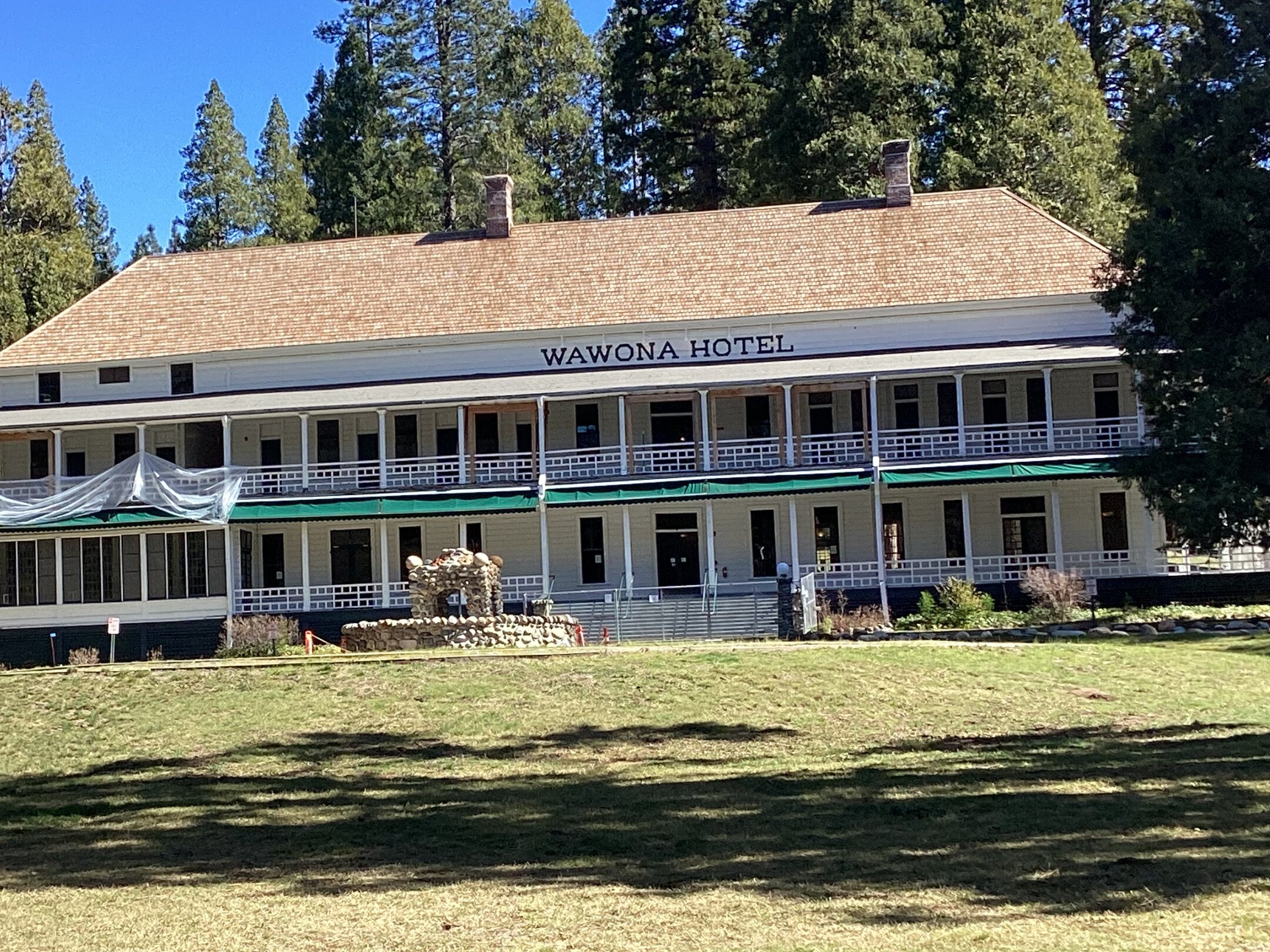
- Wawona Hotel in 2026
- Location: On CA 41 in Yosemite National Park, Wawona, California
- Coordinates: 37°32′11″N 119°39′13″W
- Area: 16.5 acres (6.7 ha)
- Built: 1876
- Architect: Washburn Brothers
- Architectural style: Late Victorian
- NRHP reference No.: 75000223

Significant dates
- Added to NRHP: October 1, 1975
- Designated NHL: May 28, 1987

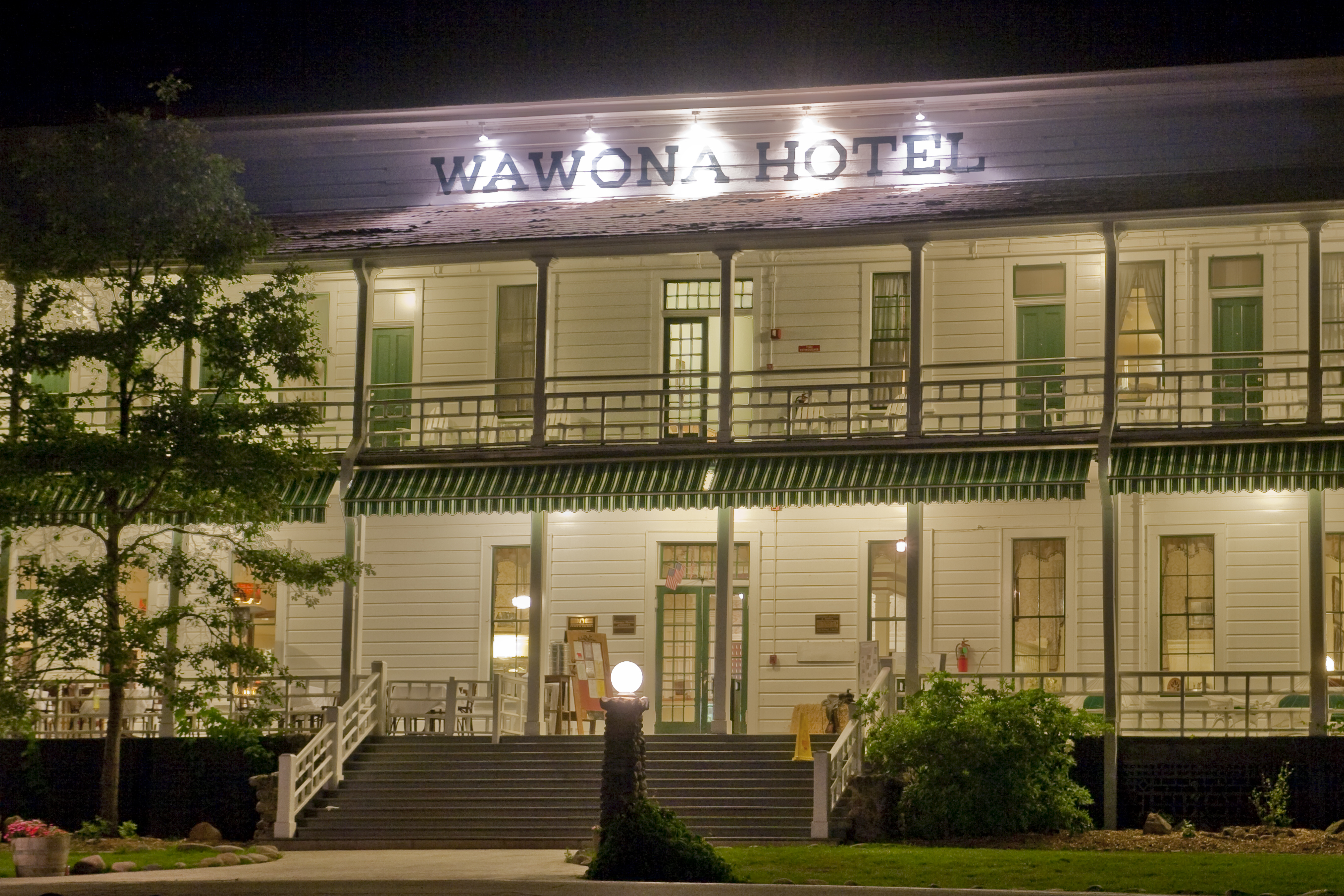
Nighttime view of the Wawona Hotel, 2009

The Wawona Hotel, located in southern Yosemite National Park, California, is a historic late Victorian mountain resort and one of the largest intact hotels of its kind within a national park. Originally established in the 1850s as Clark's Station, a pioneer stop, it soon evolved into a bustling stagecoach stop and later transformed into a grand New England–style resort, complete with manicured grounds and refined amenities. Its design catered to East Coast and European visitors, aligning with the era's trend of exclusive grand hotels.

Designated a National Historic Landmark in 1987 and listed on the National Register of Historic Places, the Wawona Hotel is notable for its cohesive architectural integrity, much of which predates World War I. Located just 4 miles (6.4 km) from Yosemite's southern entrance, it sits between the Mariposa Grove of giant sequoias and Yosemite Valley.

Owned by the National Park Service and operated through a concessionaire contract, the Wawona Hotel has endured over a century of operation, with only a brief closure during World War II before reopening in 1947. On December 2, 2024, the hotel closed indefinitely for repairs while the National Park Service conducts a "comprehensive condition assessment."

== History ==
=== Clark's Station ===
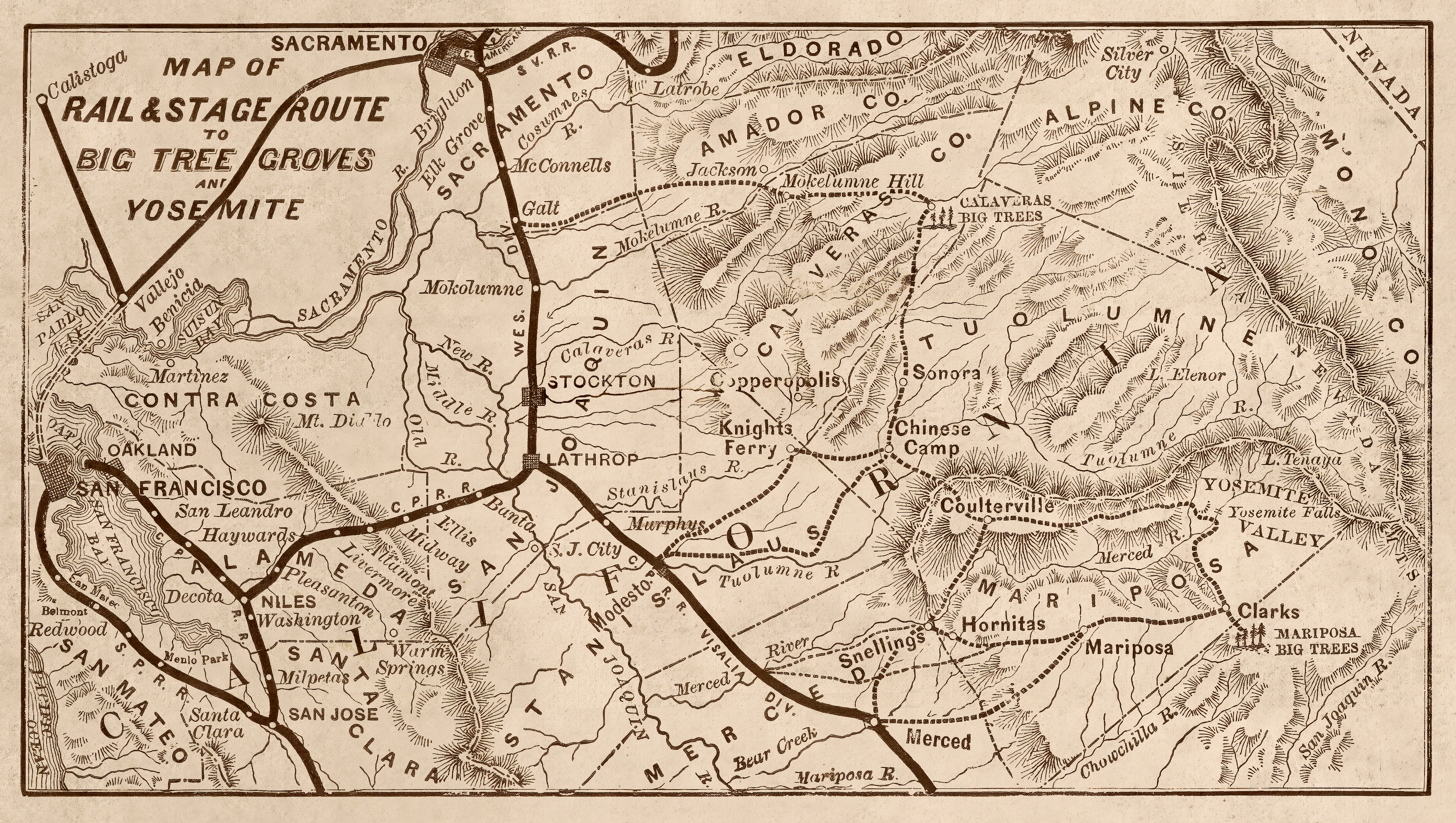
Clark & Moore's became the main staging point for excursions to Mariposa Grove following the completion of the toll road in July 1870.

The Wawona Hotel complex was originally established on the homestead of Galen Clark, one of Yosemite's earliest pioneers and the first appointed protector of Yosemite State Park in 1864.

In the late 1850s, Galen Clark expanded his modest homestead into Clark's Station. Situated 25 miles from both Mariposa and Yosemite Valley, it became an essential waypoint for travelers. With no other place to stay, Clark took in anyone passing through, aiming to make Yosemite accessible to all, rich or poor. Even when he was away, he left the door open with a sign that read: "Walk in and help yourselves, but please close and fasten the door."

After the transcontinental railroad was completed in 1869, Yosemite saw a boom in tourism. In 1870, Galen Clark partnered with Edwin Moore to expand the lodge, adding new sleeping and dining facilities to accommodate the surge in visitors. Despite the expansion of their business, now known as Clark & Moore's Station, financial woes and escalating costs pushed Clark into a cycle of debt. He was forced to sell the property on December 26, 1874.

=== Washburn's Wawona Hotel (1876–1927) ===
==== Stagecoach Era ====
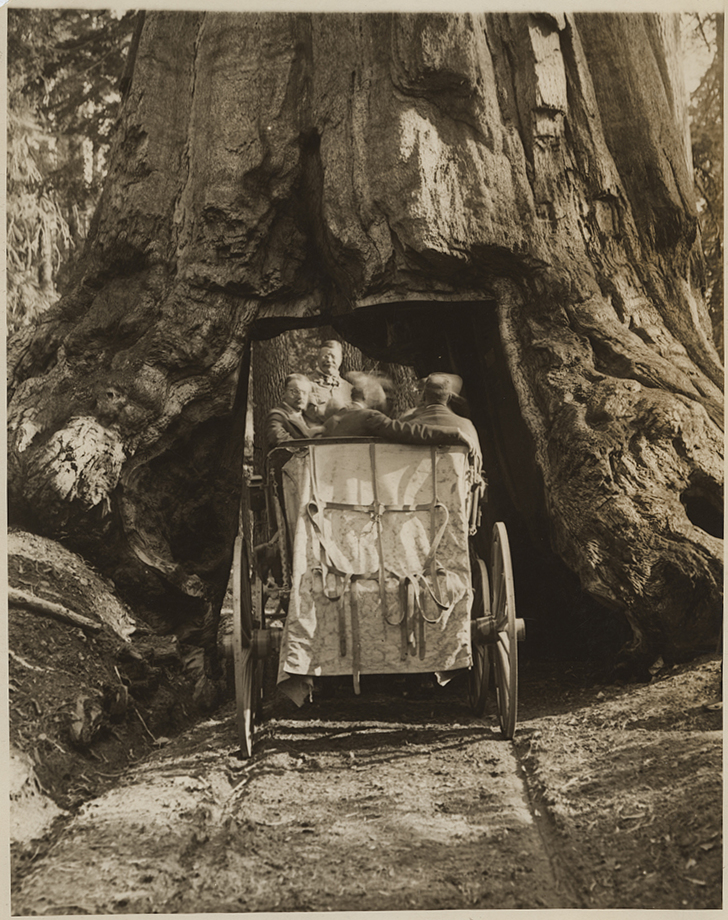
President Theodore Roosevelt and Secretary William Leob Jr. riding a carriage through the Wawona Tunnel Tree in 1903.

The Washburn family owned Clark Station for 56 years following their buyout of Galen Clark, developing the rustic waystation into a hotel. Their ownership influenced Yosemite travel and increased public awareness of the giant sequoias.

The Washburn brothers operated the Yosemite Stage and Turnpike Company, a stagecoach line connecting Yosemite's key destinations to the San Joaquin Valley. The Wawona Hotel served as a central hub, providing lodging for travelers heading to Yosemite Valley and Mariposa Grove of giant sequoias. The first wagon road from Wawona to Yosemite Valley was completed on April 18, 1875, coinciding with the Washburns’ first season operating Clark's Station.

By 1876, they added the Clark Cottage and the Long White building, starting its transformation from a modest way station to a premier resort destination.

In 1881, the Yosemite Stage and Turnpike Company created the Wawona Tunnel Tree in Mariposa Grove, an 8-foot-wide and 26-foot-long passage that quickly became a popular tourist attraction, which drew visitors to the Wawona Hotel. The company operated stagecoaches from Wawona to Mariposa Grove, holding a monopoly on stagecoach visits to the grove. Stagecoaches departed daily from the Wawona Hotel, carrying up to eight passengers on three bench seats. Lunch stops were held at Galen Clark's cabin.

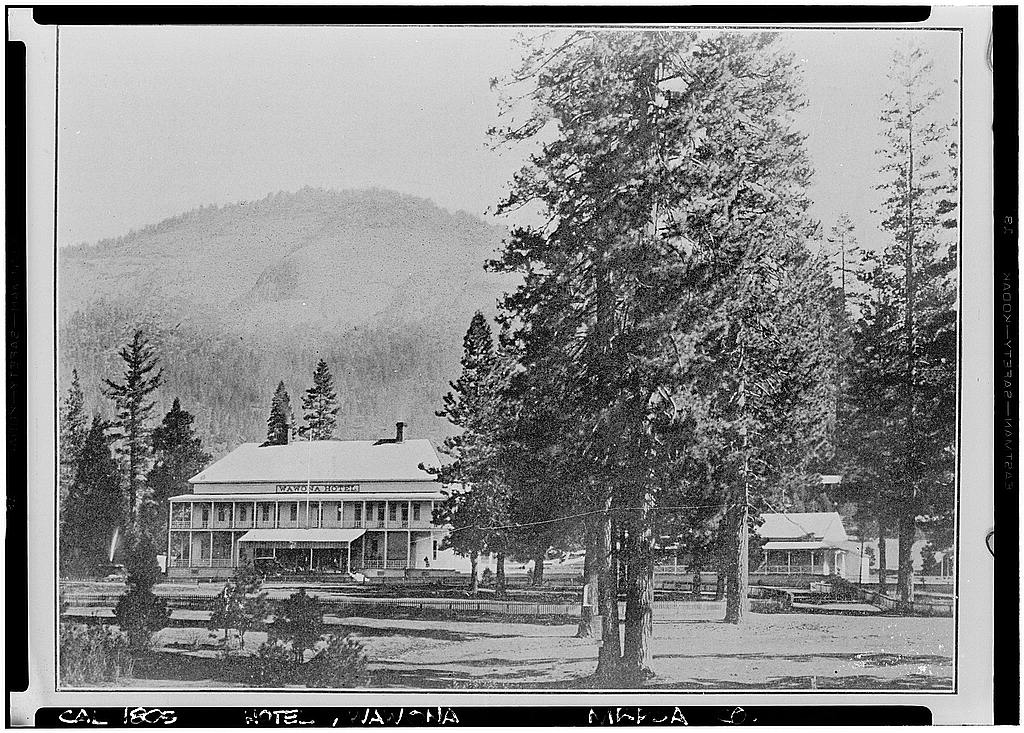
The Wawona Hotel in 1903.

Because of its isolated location, the hotel had to be self-sufficient. A post office was established around 1886, telephones were installed in 1905, and electricity was introduced in 1908. The property included springs, wells, and a large irrigation ditch that supplied water for cattle, hogs, sheep, horses, and crops of hay in Wawona Meadow. Facilities also included a store, a saloon, a truck garden, an apple orchard, and a bear cage that was occasionally used as a jail.

==== Name Change to Wawona ====
In 1884, Jean Bruce Washburn renamed the town Wawona, believing it meant "Big Tree" in the language of the indigenous tribes of the area. This name change replaced the previous name, Big Tree Station, which had been used since 1875. The Wawona Hotel was also renamed accordingly. However, it was later discovered that "Wawō'na" actually translates to evening primrose in the Miwok language.

==== Thomas Hill studio ====
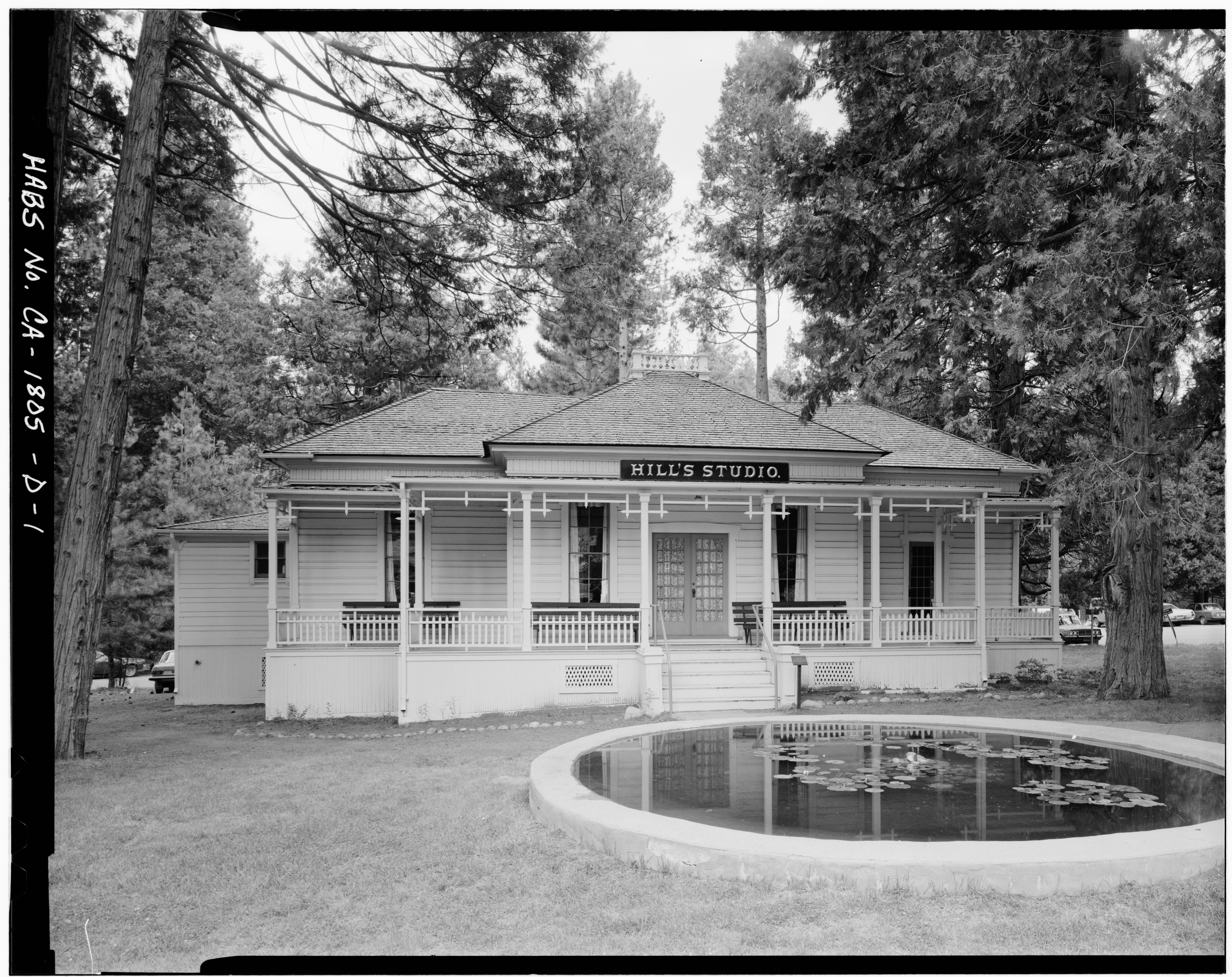
Thomas Hill studio.

Thomas Hill (painter), a renowned landscape painter of the Hudson River School, established his studio at the Wawona Hotel in the early 1880s. The studio was completed by January 1884 and became a significant cultural attraction for hotel guests, showcasing Hill's depictions of Yosemite's grandeur. Hill continued to use this studio until his death in 1908.

==== Automobile Era ====
Clarence Washburn, who took over the Yosemite Stage and Turnpike Company after his father John's death in 1917, played a pivotal role in reshaping tourism in Yosemite. In 1913, when automobiles were legalized in the park, Washburn capitalized on the influx of visitors by modernizing the Wawona Hotel. He added upscale amenities, including tennis courts, croquet lawns, fountains, and a swimming tank by 1917. Washburn also brought a first for California: a mountain golf course at Wawona Meadow, designed by pro golfer Walter Fovargue, solidifying the hotel's reputation as a premier destination.

The Wawona Hotel began operating year-round in 1918 to accommodate winter sports, supported by substantial infrastructure improvements including an upgraded water system in 1922 and a new electrical system in 1923. These enhancements allowed the hotel to offer continuous, year-round service to its guests.

By the 1915 season, the Washburn's Yosemite Stage and Turnpike Company had replaced horse-drawn carriages with automobiles, and by 1924, a garage and filling station had been added to cater to the growing number of motorists. In 1925, Wawona Meadow saw the addition of an airfield, which facilitated daily flights from Merced, delivering mail and newspapers, and offering sightseeing flights over Yosemite Valley, a service now prohibited by law.

=== Federal Purchase ===
In August 1932, the federal government purchased 2,665 acres from the Washburn family, acquiring the historic Wawona Hotel complex and surrounding land for $150,000. The Yosemite National Park Company, the park concessionaire, contributed half of the purchase price and, in return, secured the right to operate the hotel for the next 20 years. Clarence Washburn remained as manager through the 1934 season.

The sale ended decades of Washburn family ownership. Though the Yosemite National Park Company had previously shown interest in buying the property, the Washburns had resisted selling. However, the Great Depression strained the family's finances, making it increasingly difficult to maintain the land.

The Park Service had long viewed the Wawona Basin as a natural addition to Yosemite, with its lands bordering the park. The 1932 acquisition finally brought the Wawona Hotel and its surrounding area under public ownership, preserving this scenic and historic site within the park's boundaries.

=== Since the 1930s ===
The hotel is featured prominently in the 1964 World War II thriller 36 Hours, starring James Garner and Eva Marie Saint, in which the hotel serves as a U.S. military hospital in Waldshut, Germany.

On March 1, 2016, the Wawona Hotel was renamed Big Trees Lodge due to a legal dispute between the U.S. government, which owns the property, in conjunction with the new concessionaire, Aramark, and the outgoing concessionaire, Delaware North, which claimed rights to the trademarked name. The hotel regained its historic name on July 15, 2019, when a settlement was reached in the dispute.

== Features ==
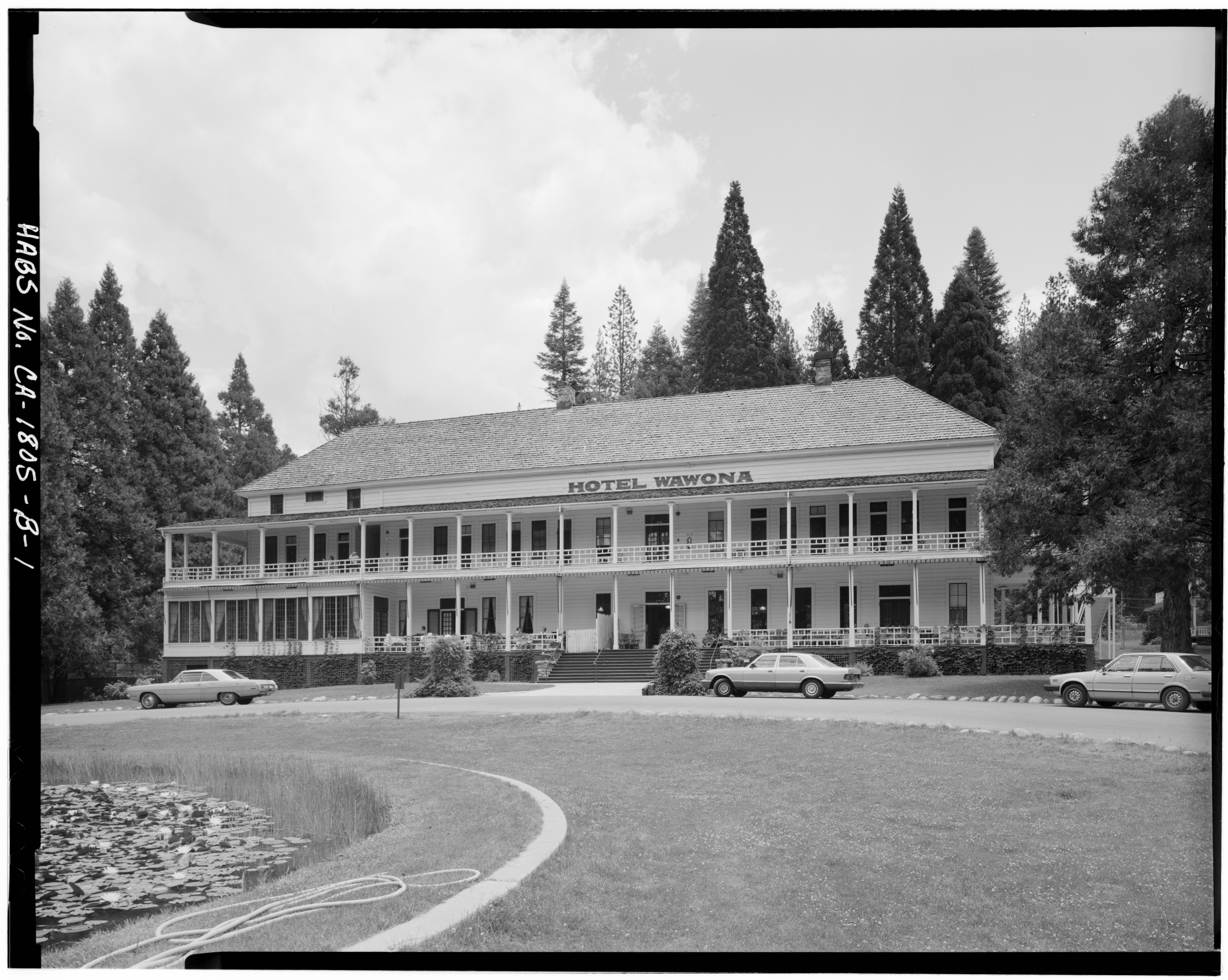
The west front entrance of the main building.

The Wawona Hotel, the largest existing Victorian-era hotel complex within a U.S. national park, is a landmark of 19th-century resort architecture. Recognized for its remarkable integrity, it is listed on the National Register of Historic Places, reflecting national significance in art and regional importance in commerce, conservation, and transportation.

The main building was constructed in 1879, with the dining room and Annex added in 1917.

=== Architecture ===
Built over four decades, the Wawona Hotel exemplifies the architectural unity uncommon in Victorian-era resorts. Wraparound porches and verandas integrate the design with its natural setting, while elements of Greek Revival, Stick-Style, and Eastlake architecture add sophistication. Signature details include the Washburn Cottage's classical accents and the Moore Cottage's Palladian-inspired cupola. Despite the loss of the Sequoia Hotel to a 1977 fire, the Wawona has preserved its pre-World War I exterior, maintaining its status as a serene retreat and a rare showcase of 19th-century resort architecture.

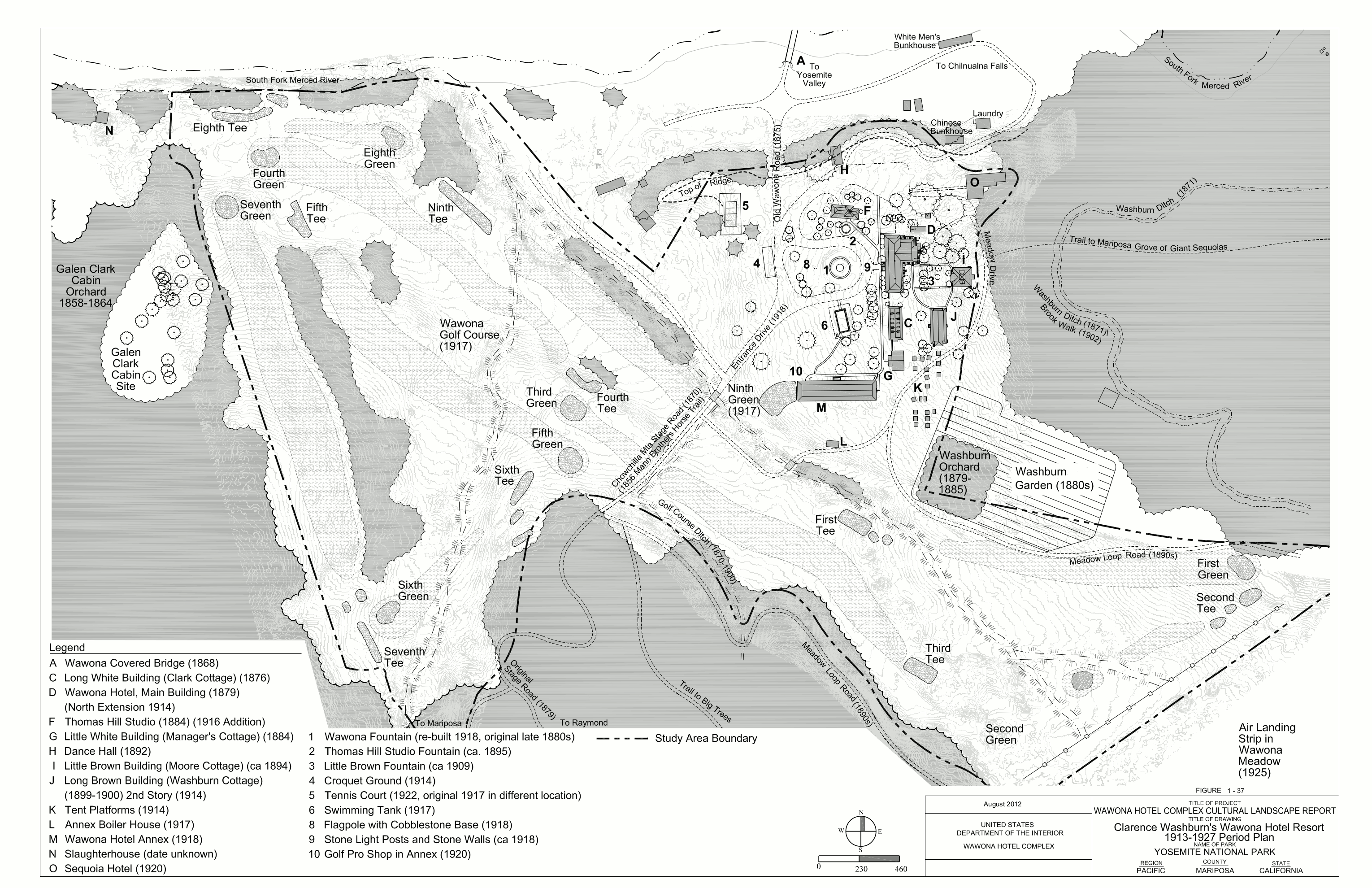
Wawona site plan.

=== Grounds ===
Situated on a forested hillside north of Wawona Road, the hotel's seven main buildings are arranged in a structured, orderly layout that aligns with the four cardinal directions, creating distinct outdoor spaces. The western forecourt includes the main entrance, a swimming tank, parking, the Wawona Fountain, and a tennis court, while the eastern courtyard is enclosed by structures like the Long White and Long Brown buildings. The Wawona Hotel was originally oriented to greet travelers arriving on the Chowchilla Mountain Stage Road, which was the main route to the hotel grounds.

=== Amenities ===
Most of the Wawona Hotel's 104 guestrooms open onto one of the hotel's deep verandas, which wrap around the first and second floors; they have open views of the gardened and natural landscapes. The rooms are furnished with antiques, period pieces, and vintage elements, and have no telephones or televisions in them. Outdoor recreation choices include quiet nature walks or scenic drives, and when snow arrives, nearby cross-country and downhill skiing and snowshoe routes.

==== Golf Course ====
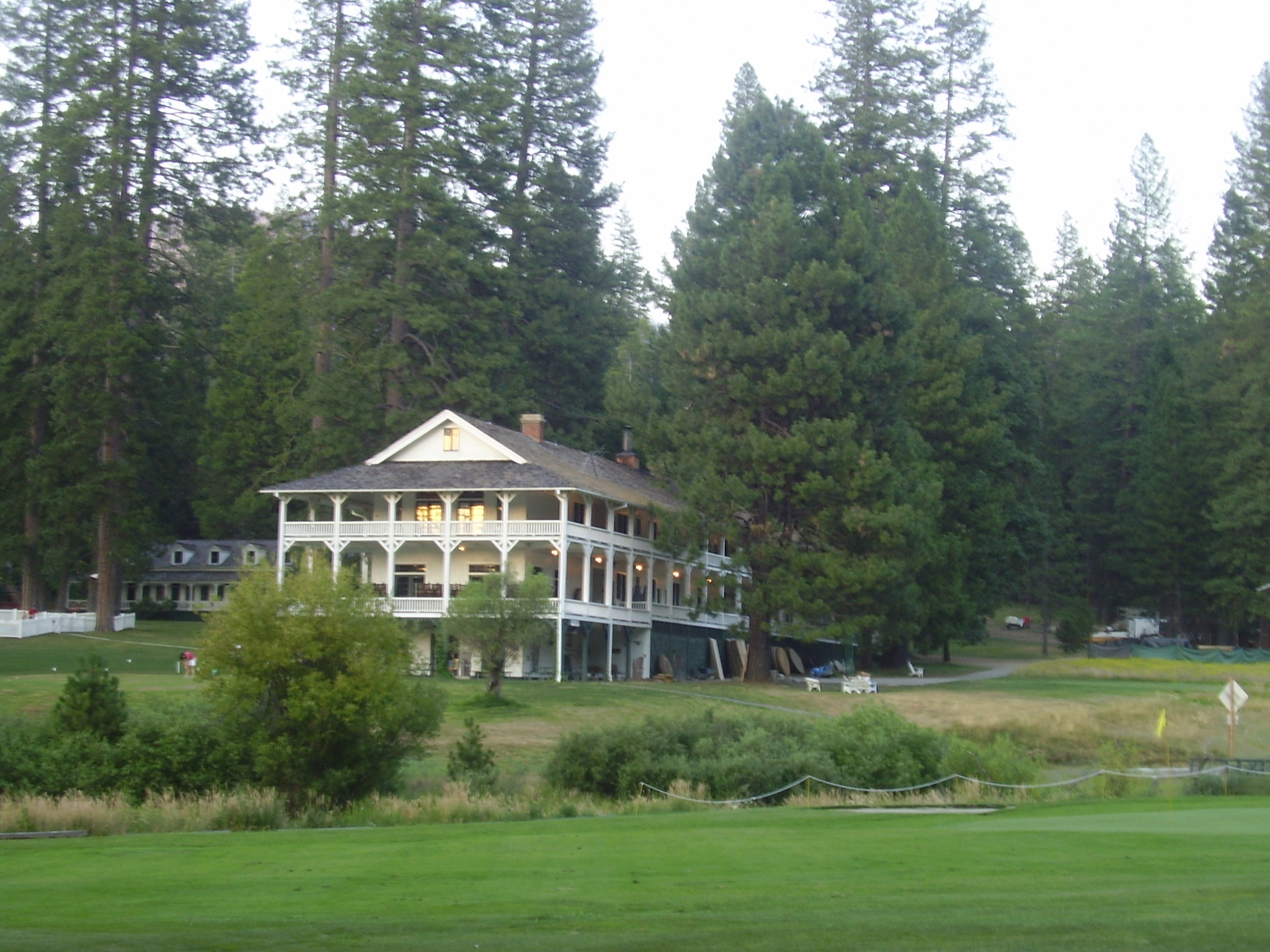
Wawona Hotel with its historic golf course in the foreground.

Across Wawona Road, the Wawona Golf Course stretches across Wawona Meadow, blending with the meadow's natural contours. Oriented northeast to southwest, the course is framed by gently sloping hills and clusters of evergreens, preserving historic sightlines between the hotel and the meadow. While some views have been partially obscured by vegetation growth, the course maintains much of its original 1917 design, contributing to the historic character of the Wawona grounds.

The nine-hole, par-35 golf course spans 3,035 yards (2,775 m) and is the only golf facility in Yosemite National Park, as well as one of the few located within any U.S. national park. Operating since 1918, it is the oldest golf course in the Sierra Nevada and remains open daily from spring through fall, weather permitting.

== Notable Guests ==
The hotel has welcomed numerous notable guests, including Presidents Teddy Roosevelt, Ulysses S. Grant and Rutherford B. Hayes, as well as film and television stars like Robert Redford and Brad Pitt.

== See also ==
- History of the Yosemite area
- List of the northern Giant Sequoia groves — 3 in Yosemite.
- List of plants of the Sierra Nevada (U.S.)
- List of Yosemite destinations
- National Register of Historic Places listings in Yosemite National Park
- National Register of Historic Places listings in Mariposa County, California
- Bibliography of the Sierra Nevada (U.S.)
