= George Monroe =

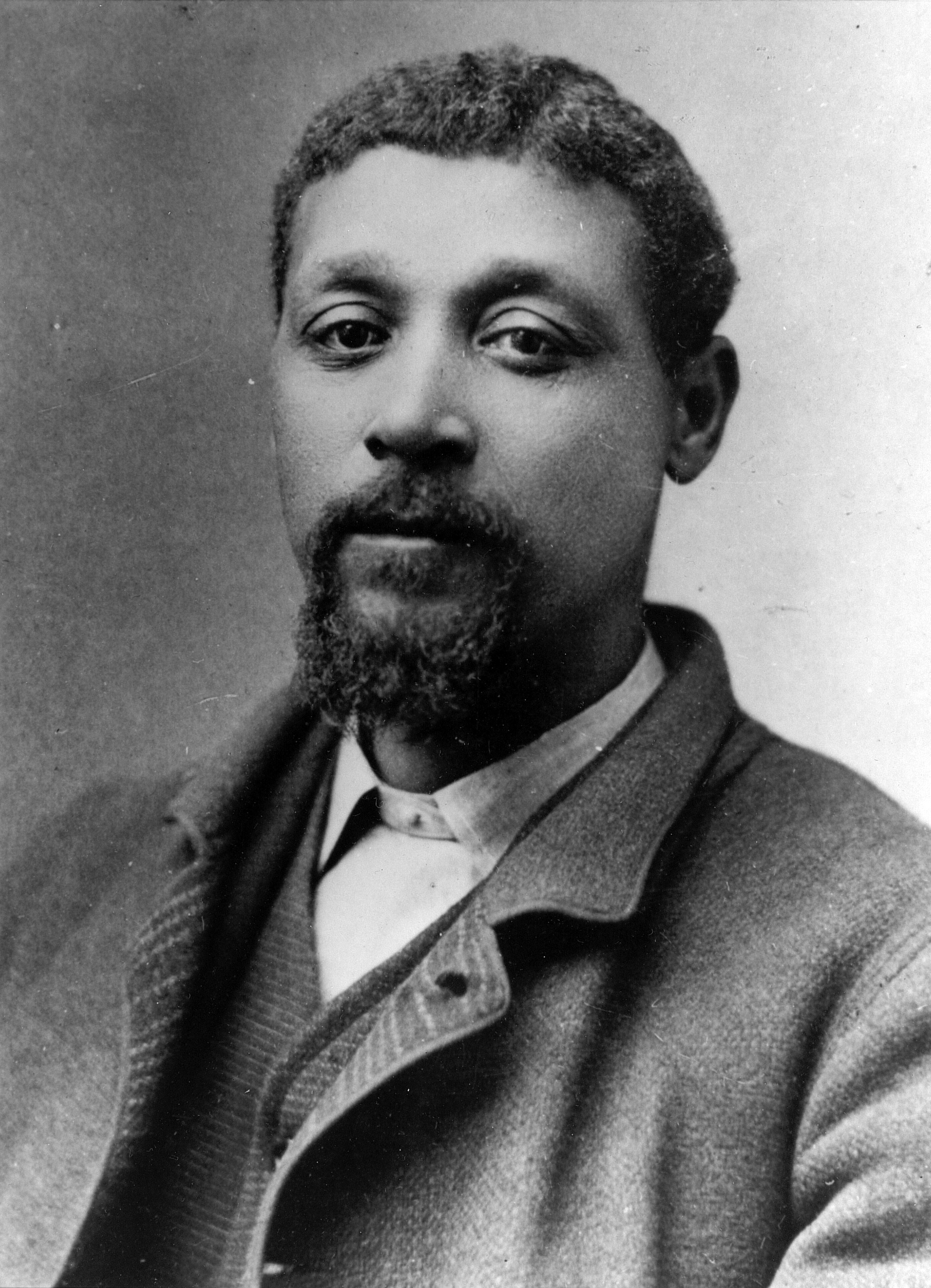
George Monroe

George Frazier Monroe (c.1844-1886) was a stagecoach driver for the Pony Express. His passengers included presidents and a socialite.

Monroe was born in Georgia c.1844 to Louis Augustus Monroe, a barber, and Mary, a free woman from Ohio. He was schooled in Washington, D.C., under the tutelage of his uncle until the age of eleven when he moved to Mariposa, California. He worked as a tour guide in Yosemite at a resort hotel owned by Henry D. Washburn called the Big Tree Station, and eventually became a stagecoach driver once the hotel could be reached by road.

Monroe drove a route on the Pony Express between Merced, California, and Mariposa, California, from 1870 to 1886. His employer Henry D. Washburn reserved Monroe as one of his most distinguished drivers and drove several U.S. Presidents including Ulysses S. Grant, Rutherford B. Hayes, and James A. Garfield, as well as socialite Lillie Langtry.

After incurring an injury as a passenger helping to stop a runaway coach, Monroe died on November 22, 1886, at the age of 42.

== Legacy ==
Fort Monroe at Yosemite National Park was named in his honor.
