= Wawona, California =

Wawona
- Census-designated place
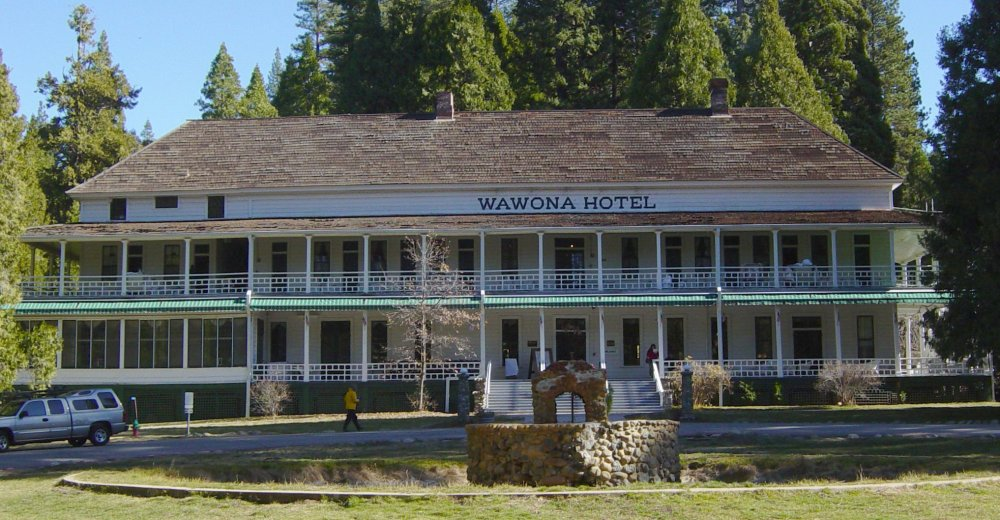
- The Wawona Hotel

- Location within California Location within the United States
- Coordinates: 37°32′13″N 119°39′23″W
- Country: United States
- State: California
- County: Mariposa

Area
  - Total: 1.076 sq mi (2.79 km^{2})
  - Land: 1.076 sq mi (2.79 km^{2})
  - Water: 0 sq mi (0 km^{2}) 0%
- Elevation: 3,999 ft (1,219 m)

Population (2020)
  - Total: 111
  - Density: 103/sq mi (39.8/km^{2})
- Time zone: UTC-8 (Pacific (PST))
  - Summer (DST): UTC-7 (PDT)
- ZIP code: 95389
- Area code: 209
- GNIS feature IDs: 2583183

Wawona (formerly Big Tree Station, Clark's Station, Clarks Station, Wah-wo-nah, and Clark's Ranch) is a census-designated place in Mariposa County, California, United States. The population was 111 at the 2020 census.

The community is located entirely within Yosemite National Park, as it preceded the founding of the park as a national recreation area. The number of inhabitants increases dramatically during peak tourist seasons, due to the large number of rental cabins in the town. It is located at 37°32′13″N 119°39′23″W, 20 miles (32 km) north of Oakhurst and 26 miles (42 km) south of the center of Yosemite Valley, at an elevation of 3,999 feet (1,219 m).

The ZIP Code is 95389. The community is within area code 209.

== History ==
It was known to the local Native American Miwok in their language as Pallachun ("a good place to stay"). The origin of the word Wawona is not known. A popular story claims Wawō'na was the Miwok word for "big tree", or for "hoot of the owl", a bird considered the sequoia trees' spiritual guardian.

Galen Clark, who helped gain preservation legislation for Mariposa Grove and what became Yosemite National Park, occupied this area in 1855. He established a tourist rest and modest ranch in 1856. Clark sold the property to the Washburn brothers in 1874, who built a larger hotel in 1876, adding to it later. Hotel keeper Jean Bruce Washburn named the resort property Wawona in 1883.

Wawona is the location of the historic Wawona Hotel, built by Washburn in 1876, with additional structures added into the early 20th century. A classic Victorian resort, it was designated a National Historic Landmark in 1987.

The Clark's Station US Post Office opened in 1878. In 1883 its name was changed to Wawona.

== Geography ==
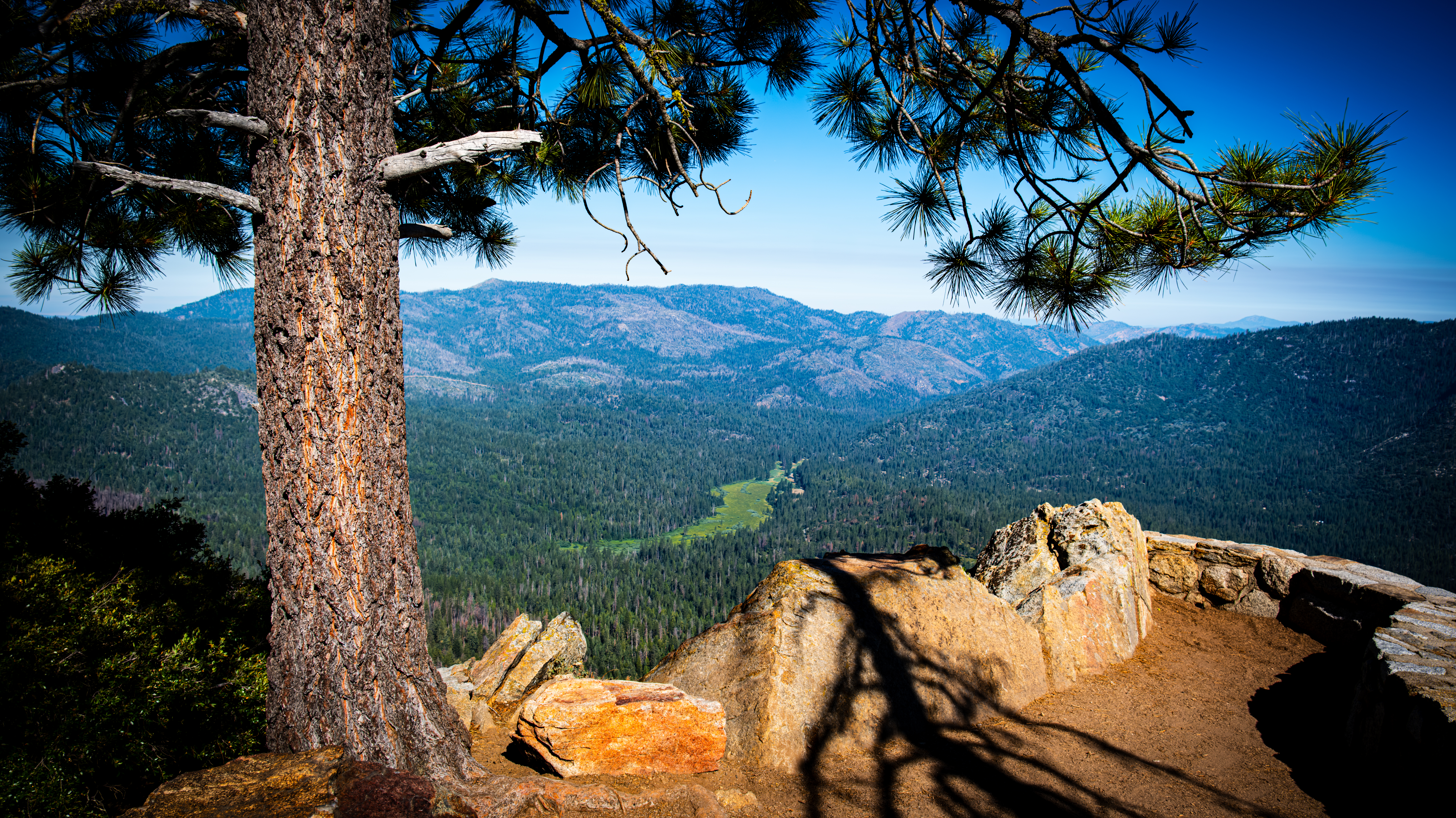
The view from Wawona Point, looking west-northwest over Wawona Meadow.

The town is located in a large mid-elevation basin with Wawona Meadow as its centerpiece. Situated in the southwestern section of Yosemite National Park, it lies along the South Fork of the Merced River at an elevation of approximately 4,000 feet (1,200 m). The town is accessible via State Route 41, the main highway from Fresno to Yosemite Valley. Wawona is the closest town to Chilnualna Falls and the Mariposa Grove of Giant Sequoia. It also serves as the main gateway to the southern Yosemite wilderness, with several principal trailheads located here.

According to the United States Census Bureau, the Wawona CDP covers an area of 1.08 square miles (2.8 km^{2}), all land.

== Demographics ==
Historical population
Census	Pop.	Note	%±
2010	169		—
2020	111		−34.3%
U.S. Decennial Census; 1850–1870 1880-1890; 1900 1910 1920; 1930 1940 1950; 1960 1970 1980; 1990 2000 2010

Wawona first appeared as a census-designated place in the 2010 United States census.

The 2020 United States census reported that Wawona had a population of 111. The population density was 103.2 inhabitants per square mile (39.8/km^{2}). The racial makeup was 99 (89.2%) White, 0 (0.0%) African American, 0 (0.0%) Native American, 0 (0.0%) Asian, 0 (0.0%) Pacific Islander, 7 (6.3%) from other races, and 5 (4.5%) from two or more races. Hispanic or Latino of any race were 7 persons (6.3%).

There were 56 households, out of which 13 (23.2%) had children under the age of 18 living in them, 22 (39.3%) were married-couple households, 4 (7.1%) were cohabiting couple households, 14 (25.0%) had a female householder with no partner present, and 16 (28.6%) had a male householder with no partner present. 18 households (32.1%) were one person, and 9 (16.1%) were one person aged 65 or older. The average household size was 1.98. There were 33 families (58.9% of all households).

The age distribution was 20 people (18.0%) under the age of 18, 3 people (2.7%) aged 18 to 24, 28 people (25.2%) aged 25 to 44, 32 people (28.8%) aged 45 to 64, and 28 people (25.2%) who were 65 years of age or older. The median age was 49.5 years. There were 59 males and 52 females.

There were 333 housing units at an average density of 309.5 units per square mile (119.5 units/km^{2}), of which 56 (16.8%) were occupied. Of these, 31 (55.4%) were owner-occupied, and 25 (44.6%) were occupied by renters.

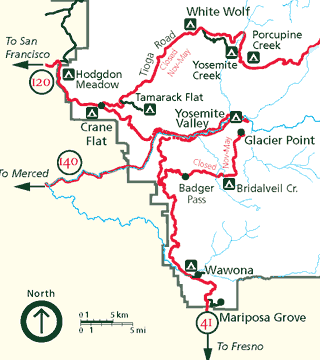
Wawona is near the southern entrance to Yosemite.

== Government ==
In the state legislature, Wawona is in the 4th senatorial district, represented by Republican Marie Alvarado-Gil, and in the 8th Assembly district, represented by Republican David Tangipa.

In the United States House of Representatives, Wawona is in California's 5th congressional district, represented by Republican Tom McClintock.

== Attractions ==
- Camp Wawona
- Chilnualna Falls
- Pioneer Yosemite History Center
- Wawona Hotel
- Wawona Tunnel Tree
