= Bootjack, California =

Unincorporated community in California, United States

Bootjack
- Census-designated place
- Location in Mariposa County and the state of California

- Location in the United States
- Coordinates: 37°28′01″N 119°52′45″W
- Country: United States
- State: California
- County: Mariposa

Area
  - Total: 3.86 sq mi (10.0 km^{2})
  - Land: 3.83 sq mi (9.9 km^{2})
  - Water: 0.03 sq mi (0.078 km^{2})
- Elevation: 2,264 ft (690 m)

Population (2020)
  - Total: 661
  - Density: 172.49/sq mi (66.60/km^{2})
- Time zone: UTC-8 (Pacific (PST))
  - Summer (DST): UTC-7 (PDT)
- ZIP code: 95338 (Mariposa)
- Area code: 209
- FIPS code: 06-07525
- GNIS feature ID: 2407885

Bootjack is an unincorporated community and census-designated place in Mariposa County, California, United States. The population was 661 at the 2020 census, down from 960 in 2010 and 1,588 in 2000, largely due to reductions in the area of the CDP.

== Geography ==
Bootjack is located south of the center of Mariposa County at an elevation of 2,264 feet (690 m) in the foothills of the Sierra Nevada. California State Route 49 passes through the community, leading west-northwest 4.5 miles (7.2 km) to Mariposa, the county seat, and southeast 21 miles (34 km) to Oakhurst.

According to the United States Census Bureau, the CDP has a total area of 3.86 square miles (10.00 km^{2}), of which 0.03 square miles (0.08 km^{2}), or 0.80%, are water. In 2010 the CDP had an area of 7.1 square miles (18 km^{2}), and in 2000 the area was 18.0 square miles (47 km^{2}).

== History ==
Bootjack began as a mining camp during the California Gold Rush following the discovery of gold in 1849. Contemporary accounts describe it as "a collection of tents, brush shacks and log huts."

The origin of the name "Bootjack" is debated. One theory suggests it refers to a fork in the road resembling a boot jack; another refers to a tree with a similar shape. A third, more colorful story involves a gambler known as “Texas Pete” who was hanged for theft, allegedly requesting the removal of his boots using a plank as a bootjack.

In its early years, Bootjack remained a minor settlement compared to regional boomtowns like Agua Fria and Mormon Bar. By the 1870s, it gained prominence as a stop on the stagecoach route between Mariposa and Clark's Station, leading to Mariposa Grove and Yosemite Valley.

In the early 20th century, Bootjack developed modestly. A post office opened on February 19, 1903, replacing the nearby "Chowchilla" post office. It operated until late 1912, when service was consolidated to Mariposa.

The local economy relied on timber, subsistence farming, and small-scale mining. By the 1930s, the Merrill Lumber Company operated a sawmill west of Bootjack. In 1939, a wildfire threatened the area, and crews from a local CCC camp helped contain the blaze—indicating a CCC presence in Bootjack during the New Deal era.

Infrastructure improvements followed with the creation of California State Route 49, the “Golden Chain Highway,” in the 1930s. By mid-century, the highway was paved and brought increased tourism and commerce through Bootjack, linking it to Mariposa and Oakhurst.

=== Postwar Community Life ===
After World War II, Bootjack retained its rural character while Mariposa County experienced gradual population growth. Improved transportation allowed residents to live in Bootjack while working in nearby towns or in forestry and national park services.

In 1949, the Bootjack Stompers Square Dance Club was founded and became a central part of local cultural life. The club held weekly dances at a community hall near the Bootjack Store and marked its 75th anniversary in 2024, making it one of California's oldest active square dance groups.

Public services also expanded. A volunteer fire company formed during the 1950s and later became Mariposa County Fire Company 37, headquartered along Highway 49. In 1967, several Bootjack residents joined the county's newly created mounted search-and-rescue posse.

As the logging industry declined by the 1970s, Bootjack residents shifted to employment in tourism, construction, and commuting to nearby cities. Agriculture, including ranching and apple orchards in areas like Jerseydale, continued on a smaller scale.

By the late 20th century, Bootjack was one of the more populous areas of the county despite lacking formal incorporation. Its census-designated place (CDP) population reached 1,588 in 2000, surpassing that of Mariposa's CDP at the time. Today, Bootjack remains a largely residential community with a mix of pioneer families and newer residents seeking a rural foothill lifestyle.

== Demographics ==
Historical population
Census	Pop.	Note	%±
1990	1,295		—
2000	1,588		22.6%
2010	960		−39.5%
2020	661		−31.1%
U.S. Decennial Census; 1850–1870 1880-1890; 1900 1910 1920; 1930 1940 1950; 1960 1970 1980; 1990 2000 2010

Bootjack first appeared as a census-designated place in the 1990 United States census.

=== 2020 census ===
As of the 2020 census, Bootjack had a population of 661. The population density was 172.5 inhabitants per square mile (66.6/km^{2}). The median age was 50.5 years. 20.9% of residents were under the age of 18 and 30.3% of residents were 65 years of age or older. For every 100 females there were 118.2 males, and for every 100 females age 18 and over there were 119.7 males age 18 and over.

0.0% of residents lived in urban areas, while 100.0% lived in rural areas.

There were 283 households in Bootjack, of which 36.4% had children under the age of 18 living in them. Of all households, 58.3% were married-couple households, 6.0% were cohabiting couple households, 16.3% were households with a male householder and no spouse or partner present, and 19.4% were households with a female householder and no spouse or partner present. About 12.0% of all households were made up of individuals and 4.6% had someone living alone who was 65 years of age or older. The average household size was 2.34. There were 228 families (80.6% of all households).

There were 315 housing units at an average density of 82.2 units per square mile (31.7 units/km^{2}), of which 10.2% were vacant and 283 (89.8%) were occupied. Of these, 220 (77.7%) were owner-occupied and 63 (22.3%) were occupied by renters. The homeowner vacancy rate was 0.4% and the rental vacancy rate was 0.0%.

Racial composition as of the 2020 census
Race	Number	Percent
White	528	79.9%
Black or African American	7	1.1%
American Indian and Alaska Native	33	5.0%
Asian	23	3.5%
Native Hawaiian and Other Pacific Islander	0	0.0%
Some other race	9	1.4%
Two or more races	61	9.2%
Hispanic or Latino (of any race)	58	8.8%

== Government ==
In the California State Legislature, Bootjack is in the 4th senatorial district, represented by Republican Marie Alvarado-Gil, and the 8th Assembly district, represented by Republican David Tangipa.

In the United States House of Representatives, Bootjack is in California's 5th congressional district, represented by Republican Tom McClintock.
