= Agua Fria, California =

Agua Fria
- Unincorporated community
- Location in California Agua Fria (the United States)
- Coordinates: 37°29′06″N 120°01′13″W
- Country: United States
- State: California
- County: Mariposa
- Elevation: 2,000 ft (610 m)

California Historical Landmark
- Reference no.: 518

Agua Fria (Spanish for "Cold Water") is an unincorporated community in Mariposa County, California, United States. It is located 5.25 miles (8.4 km) northeast of Catheys Valley, at an elevation of 2001 feet (610 m). Agua Fria is the former county seat of Mariposa County, located approximately three miles west of Mariposa.

== History ==
Agua Fria was originally a mining camp of the California Gold Rush, and was divided into Lower Agua Fria and Upper Agua Fria. Agua Fria means "cold water" in Spanish, and the name was derived from two springs of cold water about a quarter mile below Lower Agua Fria (the main part of town). It may have been here that John C. Fremont's men discovered gold in 1849 on his Rancho Las Mariposas.

In 1850, it was a booming trade center and the final destination for many new arrivals in California. It was Mariposa County's first Seat of Justice from February 18, 1850, to November 10, 1851. A post office was established October 7, 1851.

In 1853, a 6-stamp quartz mill was established in Upper Agua Fria. The camp boasted a hotel, express office, assayers, billiard room, bowling alley, monte and faro banks, about a dozen stores, numerous tents and log cabins by the fall of 1850. The population started to decline by the mid-19th century, and the city suffered destructive fires and was never rebuilt.

John Charles "Charlie" Fremont moved the Mariposa County seat to Mariposa in 1854. The stately white Mariposa County Courthouse was built on present-day Bullion Street in 1854, and not only still stands, but is the oldest courthouse in California still in use as cases are still tried there to this day.

A post office operated at Agua Fria from 1851 to 1862.

== Present status ==
Agua Fria is a ghost town with little to see but grassy meadows. It is accessible via Agua Fria Road to Mount Bullion and the site of Princeton. It is also an alternate route into Mariposa. The site is private property, and is a California Historical Landmark (#518).

== Sources ==
- Agua Fria California State Historic Landmark 518
- Agua Fria
