= Greeley Hill, California =

Greeley Hill
- Census-designated place
- Location in Mariposa County, California

- Location within California Location within the United States
- Coordinates: 37°44′25″N 120°07′25″W
- Country: United States
- State: California
- County: Mariposa

Area
  - Total: 23.927 sq mi (61.97 km^{2})
  - Land: 23.881 sq mi (61.85 km^{2})
  - Water: 0.046 sq mi (0.12 km^{2}) 0.19%
- Elevation: 3,153 ft (961 m)

Population (2020)
  - Total: 927
  - Density: 38.8/sq mi (15.0/km^{2})
- Time zone: UTC-8 (Pacific (PST))
  - Summer (DST): UTC-7 (PDT)
- ZIP Code: 95311 (Coulterville)
- GNIS feature ID: 2583028
- FIPS code: 06-30900

Greeley Hill is a census-designated place in Mariposa County, California, United States. Greeley Hill sits at an elevation of 3,153 feet (961 m) in the foothills of the Sierra Nevada. The 2020 United States census reported Greeley Hill's population as 927.

== Geography ==
The community is on the northern border of Mariposa County, with Tuolumne County to the north. It shares a ZIP Code (95311) with the town of Coulterville, which is 6 miles (10 km) to the southwest down Greeley Hill Road.

According to the United States Census Bureau, the CDP has an area of 23.927 square miles (61.97 km^{2}), of which 0.05 square miles (0.13 km^{2}), or 0.19%, are water. The town center is in a wide upland valley drained by Bean Creek, which flows east to the North Fork of the Merced River within Stanislaus National Forest.

== Demographics ==
Historical population
Census	Pop.	Note	%±
2010	915		—
2020	927		1.3%
U.S. Decennial Census; 1850–1870 1880-1890; 1900 1910 1920; 1930 1940 1950; 1960 1970 1980; 1990 2000 2010

Greeley Hill first appeared as a census-designated place in the 2010 United States census.

The 2020 United States census reported that Greeley Hill had a population of 927. The population density was 38.8 inhabitants per square mile (15.0/km^{2}). The racial makeup of Greeley Hill was 760 (82.0%) White, 8 (0.9%) African American, 13 (1.4%) Native American, 3 (0.3%) Asian, 1 (0.1%) Pacific Islander, 25 (2.7%) from other races, and 117 (12.6%) from two or more races. Hispanic or Latino of any race were 114 persons (12.3%).

The whole population lived in households. There were 431 households, out of which 73 (16.9%) had children under the age of 18 living in them, 184 (42.7%) were married-couple households, 29 (6.7%) were cohabiting couple households, 106 (24.6%) had a female householder with no partner present, and 112 (26.0%) had a male householder with no partner present. 144 households (33.4%) were one person, and 68 (15.8%) were one person aged 65 or older. The average household size was 2.15. There were 249 families (57.8% of all households).

The age distribution was 124 people (13.4%) under the age of 18, 50 people (5.4%) aged 18 to 24, 121 people (13.1%) aged 25 to 44, 301 people (32.5%) aged 45 to 64, and 331 people (35.7%) who were 65 years of age or older. The median age was 58.6 years. For every 100 females, there were 94.3 males.

There were 627 housing units at an average density of 26.3 units per square mile (10.2 units/km^{2}), of which 431 (68.7%) were occupied. Of these, 343 (79.6%) were owner-occupied, and 88 (20.4%) were occupied by renters.
