= Lake Don Pedro =

Lake Don Pedro may refer to:

- Don Pedro Reservoir, a man-made lake in Tuolumne County, California
- Lake Don Pedro, California, a census-designated place in Mariposa County, California
