= Foresta, California =

Unincorporated community in California, United States

Crane Creek
- Unincorporated community Census-designated place
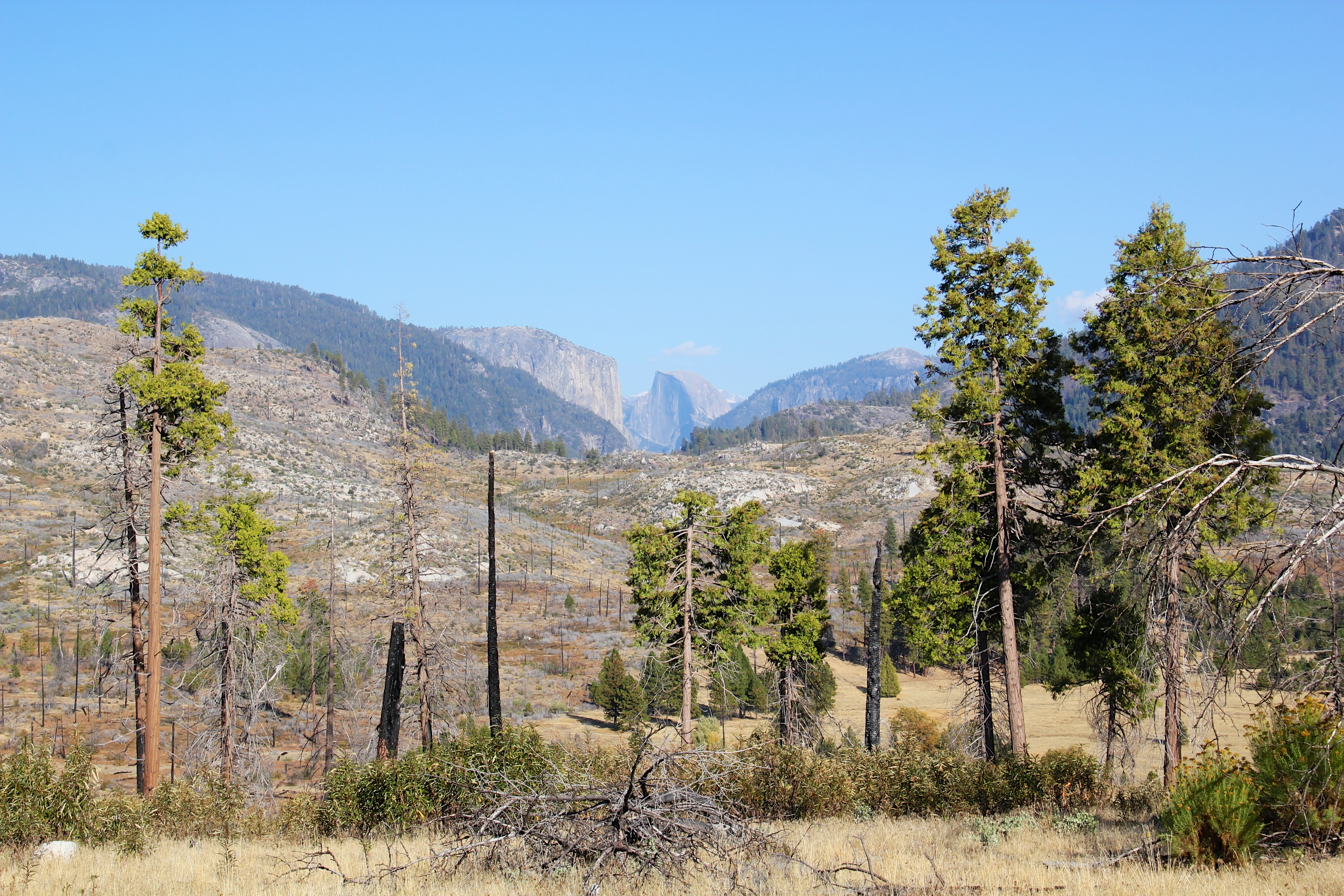
- Yosemite Valley as seen from Foresta

- Location within California Location within the United States
- Coordinates: 37°41′56″N 119°44′54″W
- Country: United States
- State: California
- County: Mariposa

Area
  - Total: 0.37 sq mi (0.96 km^{2})
  - Land: 0.37 sq mi (0.96 km^{2})
  - Water: 0 sq mi (0.00 km^{2})
- Elevation: 4,420 ft (1,350 m)

Population (2020)
  - Total: 29
  - Density: 78.38/sq mi (30.26/km^{2})
- Time zone: UTC-8 (Pacific (PST))
  - Summer (DST): UTC-7 (PDT)
- ZIP Code: 95389 (Yosemite National Park)
- FIPS code: 06-24792
- GNIS feature ID: 2830231

Foresta (formerly, McCauley and Opim) is an unincorporated community and a census-designated place (CDP) in Mariposa County, California, United States, situated within Yosemite National Park.

== History ==
The name comes from the Foresta Land Company, founded by A.B. Davis in 1913. Davis built a resort at Foresta but abandoned it. The Foresta area was subdivided and sold off to investors by the 1930s, but little construction at the site took place until electricity was extended to Foresta in 1951. Building of private residences mostly began at that time and continued until the early 1960s, with a campground built soon after. Besides local residents, Foresta now is home to NatureBridge employees. Most of the structures are vacation homes, some of which are also vacation rentals. The community is located on the slopes surrounding Big Meadow, three miles off the Big Oak Flat Road. Many of the homes in the area burned in a 1990 wildfire.

The Opim post office operated there from 1882 to 1884.

== Geography ==
The CDP is located 2.25 miles (3.6 km) northeast of El Portal, at an elevation of 4,420 feet (1,350 m).

== Demographics ==
Historical population
Census	Pop.	Note	%±
2020	29		—
U.S. Decennial Census; 1850–1870 1880-1890; 1900 1910 1920; 1930 1940 1950; 1960 1970 1980; 1990 2000 2010

The community was first listed as a census designated place under the name Crane Creek in the 2020 U.S. census. The CDP's name was changed to Foresta by the U.S. Census Bureau in 2022.

=== 2020 census ===
Foresta CDP, California – Racial and ethnic composition Note: the US Census treats Hispanic/Latino as an ethnic category. This table excludes Latinos from the racial categories and assigns them to a separate category. Hispanics/Latinos may be of any race.
Race / Ethnicity (NH = Non-Hispanic)	Pop 2020	% 2020
White alone (NH)	21	72.41%
Black or African American alone (NH)	0	0.00%
Native American or Alaska Native alone (NH)	0	0.00%
Asian alone (NH)	0	0.00%
Pacific Islander alone (NH)	0	0.00%
Other race alone (NH)	1	3.45%
Mixed race or Multiracial (NH)	6	20.69%
Hispanic or Latino (any race)	1	3.45%
Total	29	100.00%
