= Ben Hur, California =

Unincorporated community in California, United States

Ben Hur
- Unincorporated community
- Location in California Ben Hur (the United States)
- Coordinates: 37°21′06″N 119°57′28″W
- Country: United States
- State: California
- County: Mariposa
- Elevation: 1,752 ft (534 m)
- Time zone: UTC-8 (Pacific (PST))
  - Summer (DST): UTC-7 (PDT)
- GNIS feature ID: 1658033

Ben Hur is an unincorporated community in Mariposa County, California, United States. It is located 9 miles (14 km) south of Mariposa.

The community was established as a cattle ranch by Morgan Quick in 1859 and was originally called the Rancheria Place; the ranch would be owned and operated by the Quick family for six generations.

A post office operated at Ben Hur from 1890 to 1902, and after moving from 1904 to 1951. The name comes from the hero of the novel Ben-Hur.
