= Becknell Creek =

Stream in California, United States

Coordinates: 37°17′54″N 119°58′08″W

Becknell Creek is a stream located in the U.S. state of California. It is located in Mariposa County.
