= Mount Bullion, Mariposa County, California =

Unincorporated community in California, United States

Mount Bullion
- Census-designated place
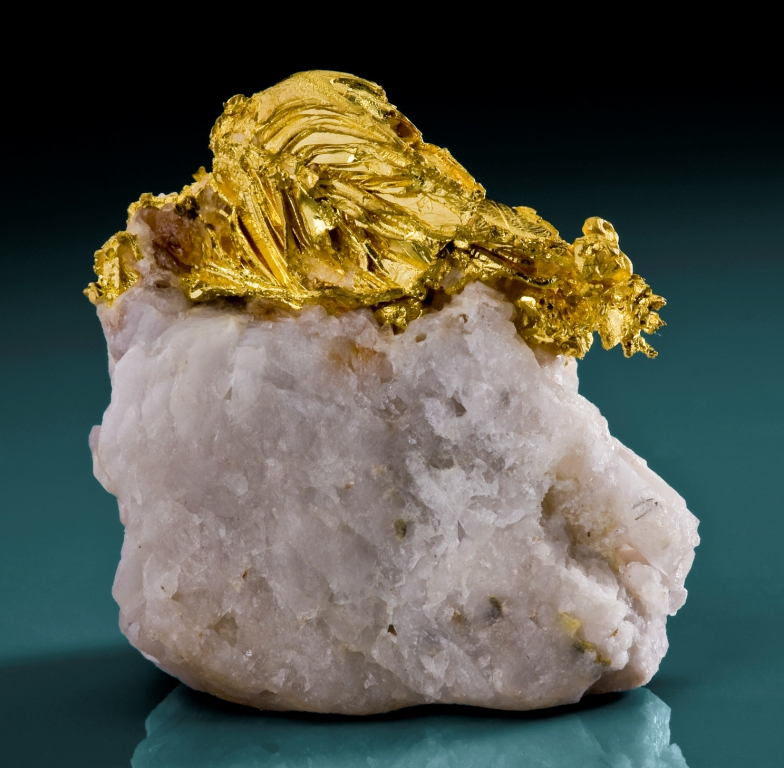
- Gold on quartz, Mockingbird Mine near Mt. Bullion

- Location within California Location within the United States
- Coordinates: 37°30′26″N 120°02′42″W
- Country: United States
- State: California
- County: Mariposa

Area
  - Total: 0.611 sq mi (1.58 km^{2})
  - Land: 0.610 sq mi (1.58 km^{2})
  - Water: 0.001 sq mi (0.0026 km^{2})
- Elevation: 2,152 ft (656 m)

Population (2020)
  - Total: 154
  - Density: 252.5/sq mi (97.5/km^{2})
- Time zone: UTC-8 (Pacific (PST))
  - Summer (DST): UTC-7 (PDT)
- ZIP Code: 95338 (Mariposa)
- GNIS feature IDs: 233575; 2812657

Mount Bullion (formerly, Princeton and La Mineta) is an unincorporated community and census-designated place (CDP) in Mariposa County, California, United States. As of the 2020 United States census, it had a population of 154.

A post office operated at Mount Bullion from 1862 to 1955, with a closure for a period during 1887. The place was first named "La Mineta" (for "little mine"). Then it was called "Princeton" for the Princeton Mine nearby. Finally, the name "Mount Bullion" was applied in honor of Senator Thomas Hart Benton, whose nickname was "Old Bullion" due to his fiscal policies.

== Geography ==
The community is in west-central Mariposa County, along California State Route 49. It is 5 miles (8 km) northwest of Mariposa, the county seat, and 6 miles (10 km) southeast of Bear Valley, at an elevation of 2,152 feet (656 m).

The Mount Bullion CDP has an area of 0.61 square miles (1.58 km^{2}), all but 0.001 square miles (0.003 km^{2}) of which is land. The town sits on a low divide between the headwaters of Agua Fria Creek flowing to the southeast and the heads of Norwegian Gulch and Green Gulch, which run west to Bear Creek. Both creek systems find their ways southwestward into the San Joaquin Valley.

== Demographics ==
Historical population
Census	Pop.	Note	%±
2020	154		—
U.S. Decennial Census; 1850–1870 1880-1890; 1900 1910 1920; 1930 1940 1950; 1960 1970 1980; 1990 2000 2010

Mount Bullion first appeared as a census designated place in the 2020 U.S. census

=== 2020 Census ===
Mt. Bullion CDP, California – Racial and ethnic composition Note: the US Census treats Hispanic/Latino as an ethnic category. This table excludes Latinos from the racial categories and assigns them to a separate category. Hispanics/Latinos may be of any race.
Race / Ethnicity (NH = Non-Hispanic)	Pop 2020	% 2020
White alone (NH)	112	72.73%
Black or African American alone (NH)	3	1.95%
Native American or Alaska Native alone (NH)	0	0.00%
Asian alone (NH)	0	0.00%
Pacific Islander alone (NH)	0	0.00%
Other race alone (NH)	1	0.65%
Mixed race or Multiracial (NH)	12	7.79%
Hispanic or Latino (any race)	26	16.88%
Total	154	100.00%
