= Indian Gulch, California =

Unincorporated community in California, United States

Indian Gulch
- Unincorporated community
- Location in California Indian Gulch (the United States)
- Coordinates: 37°26′22″N 120°11′49″W
- Country: United States
- State: California
- County: Mariposa
- Elevation: 968 ft (295 m)
- GNIS feature ID: 1658812

Indian Gulch (formerly, Indiangulch and Santa Cruz) is a former settlement in Mariposa County, California, United States. It lies at an elevation of 968 feet (295 m).

Indian Gulch was established in the 1850s as a gold mining community. The town had a church, hotel, blacksmith shop, and an estimated population of several hundred. By 1910, the church was no longer active and was deeded to the Catholic Church in 1914. When the church was moved to Mariposa in 1973, the town was down to one resident. The church later burned. A cemetery and a few scattered buildings remain today.

A post office operated at Indian Gulch from 1855 to 1912, with a closure during part of 1901. The place was originally called Santa Cruz from the nearby Santa Cruz Mountain 1.25 miles (2 km) to the north-northwest of the town. Indian Gulch once had telephone service, but supposedly never had electricity.
