= Lake Don Pedro, California =

Lake Don Pedro
- Census-designated place
- Location in Mariposa County, California

- Location within California Location within the United States
- Coordinates: 37°38′46″N 120°20′12″W
- Country: United States
- State: California
- County: Mariposa

Area
  - Total: 19.707 sq mi (51.04 km^{2})
  - Land: 18.421 sq mi (47.71 km^{2})
  - Water: 1.286 sq mi (3.33 km^{2}) 6.53%
- Elevation: 1,122 ft (342 m)

Population (2020)
  - Total: 1,765
  - Density: 95.8/sq mi (37.0/km^{2})
- Time zone: UTC-8 (Pacific (PST))
  - Summer (DST): UTC-7 (PDT)
- ZIP Codes: 95329 (La Grange); 95311 (Coulterville)
- GNIS feature ID: 2627934

Lake Don Pedro is a census-designated place (CDP) in Mariposa County, California, United States. The community sits at an elevation of 1,122 feet (342 m). As of the 2020 United States census, the population was 1,765.

== Geography ==
The community occupies the northwestern corner of Mariposa County, bordered to the north and west by Tuolumne County and to the southwest by Merced County. The CDP extends east to the shore of Lake McClure, a reservoir on the Merced River. According to the U.S. Census Bureau, the CDP covers an area of 19.7 square miles (51 km^{2}), of which 18.4 square miles (48 km^{2}) are land and 1.3 square miles (3.4 km^{2}), or 6.53%, are water.

California State Route 132 passes through the northern parts of the community, leading east 13 miles (21 km) to Coulterville and west 8 miles (13 km) to La Grange. Modesto is 40 miles (64 km) to the west.

== Demographics ==
Historical population
Census	Pop.	Note	%±
2010	1,077		—
2020	1,765		63.9%
U.S. Decennial Census; 2010

Lake Don Pedro first appeared as a census designated place in the 2010 U.S. census.

The 2020 United States census reported that Lake Don Pedro had a population of 1,765. The population density was 95.8 inhabitants per square mile (37.0/km^{2}). The racial makeup of Lake Don Pedro was 1,303 (73.8%) White, 3 (0.2%) African American, 29 (1.6%) Native American, 37 (2.1%) Asian, 3 (0.2%) Pacific Islander, 126 (7.1%) from other races, and 264 (15.0%) from two or more races. Hispanic or Latino of any race were 303 persons (17.2%).

The whole population lived in households. There were 719 households, out of which 149 (20.7%) had children under the age of 18 living in them, 432 (60.1%) were married-couple households, 49 (6.8%) were cohabiting couple households, 117 (16.3%) had a female householder with no partner present, and 121 (16.8%) had a male householder with no partner present. 148 households (20.6%) were one person, and 78 (10.8%) were one person aged 65 or older. The average household size was 2.45. There were 518 families (72.0% of all households).

The age distribution was 266 people (15.1%) under the age of 18, 93 people (5.3%) aged 18 to 24, 345 people (19.5%) aged 25 to 44, 569 people (32.2%) aged 45 to 64, and 492 people (27.9%) who were 65 years of age or older. The median age was 54.7 years. For every 100 females, there were 101.3 males.

There were 923 housing units at an average density of 50.1 units per square mile (19.3 units/km^{2}), of which 719 (77.9%) were occupied. Of these, 602 (83.7%) were owner-occupied, and 117 (16.3%) were occupied by renters.
