= Catheys Valley, California =

Catheys Valley
- Census-designated place
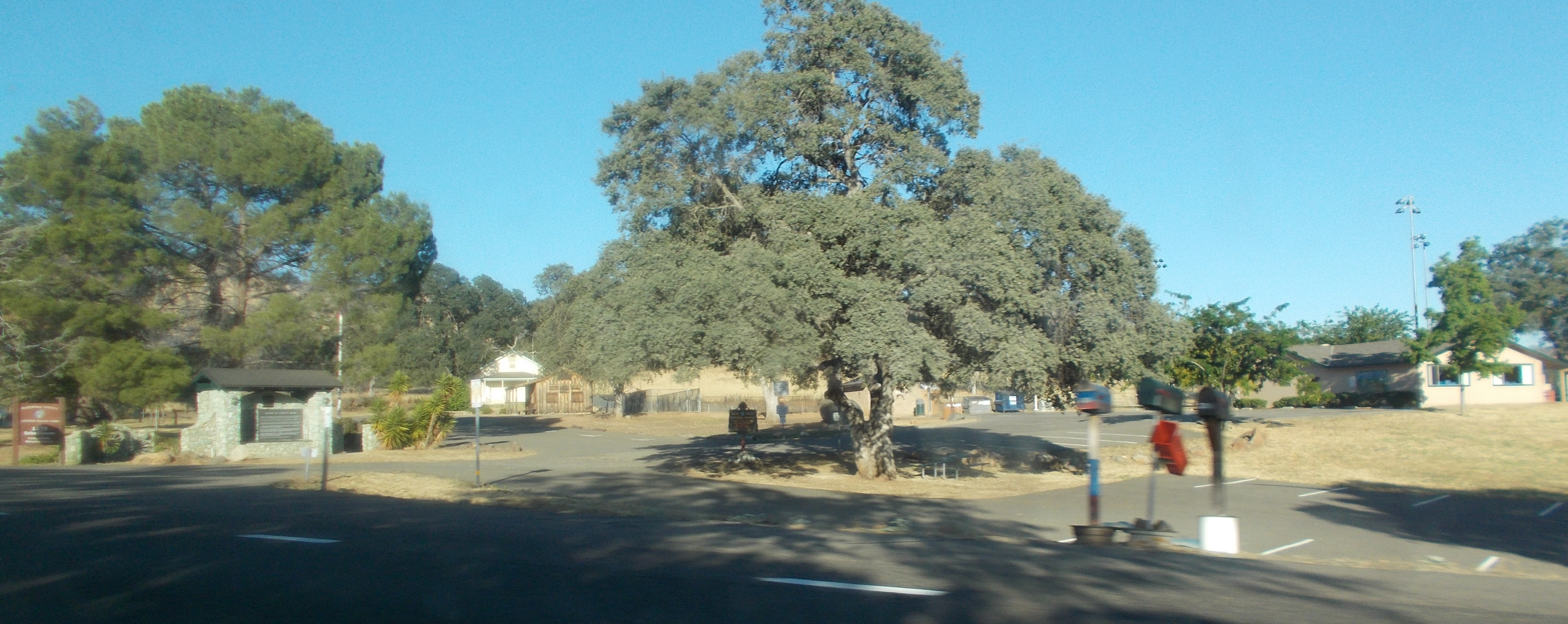
- Catheys Valley park entrance

- Location within California Location within the United States
- Coordinates: 37°25′27″N 120°07′23″W
- Country: United States
- State: California
- County: Mariposa
- Named for: Andrew Cathey

Area
  - Total: 23.67 sq mi (61.30 km^{2})
  - Land: 23.61 sq mi (61.15 km^{2})
  - Water: 0.058 sq mi (0.15 km^{2}) 0.21%
- Elevation: 1,303 ft (397 m)

Population (2020)
  - Total: 829
  - Density: 35.11/sq mi (13.56/km^{2})
- Time zone: UTC-8 (Pacific (PST))
  - Summer (DST): UTC-7 (PDT)
- ZIP Code: 95306
- Area code: 209
- FIPS code: 06-12062
- GNIS feature ID: 2582968

Catheys Valley (formerly, Cathay and Cathey's Valley) is a census-designated place in Mariposa County, California, United States. It lies in Catheys Valley, 22 miles (35 km) northeast of Merced and 8 miles (13 km) southwest of Mariposa, at an elevation of 1,325 feet (404 m). As of the 2020 census, Catheys Valley had a population of 829. It was named after Andrew Cathey, a native of North Carolina, who settled in the valley around 1850.

== History ==
Cathey's Valley was named after Andrew D. Cathey, born in 1804 in Buncombe, North Carolina. He married Mary Deaver in 1828. Andrew was an adventurous young man in his early life. He decided to leave North Carolina on an exploratory trip to California with the Rowland-Hammond-Wills families from Virginia, North Carolina, and Georgia. Their wagons loaded with household goods, they blazed a trail westward, settling in Benton, Arkansas.

When the California Gold Rush began in 1849, many men left their families in search of gold. Andrew, his son Daniel, and son-in-law Benjamin Wills, traveled by river boat from Fort Smith, Arkansas, to New Orleans and then took a ship to the Isthmus of Panama. In Panama, they boarded a ship bound for San Francisco; from there they caught a stage overland to Indian Gulch in Mariposa County.

In 1851, Andrew returned to Arkansas for his family. The Cathey-Wills, Rowland, and Hammond families organized a wagon train to California. Some of the families were those who had come from North Carolina earlier, leaving the Hammonds to start from Collegeville, Arkansas.

Andrew Cathey was appointed captain of the Cathey-Wills wagon train. About twenty families traveled in covered wagons pulled by oxen. Horses were used to drive the approximate thirty head of cattle. It is said that only one steer was lost on the entire trip, and it was believed stolen by the Indians.

A trip journal shows that they traveled to Fort Smith, Arkansas, where they re-grouped and purchased supplies for the trip that began on April 2. Rather than following the Santa Fe Trail, they traveled the southern route through Fort Bliss near El Paso, Fort Tucson, Arizona, then began following the Gila River. As the wagon train moved across the land, more people joined them. Special duties were assigned to everyone. When they reached the Rio Grande, the wagon beds had to be taken apart and all bolt holes were tightly plugged with wooden pegs. The cracks were caulked with what they had available. Together, they formed a ferry-like raft to transport their families, their livestock, and household goods across the river. The Gearys had started out with the Oatman family. The Oatmans had been warned the Indians were on the warpath. The Gearys joined with the Cathey wagon train and later they came upon the aftermath of the Oatman wagon train. Upon seeing the burned wagons and recognizing Mrs. Oatman's clothing, Mrs Geary was overcome with grief. The Catheys never encountered any hostility by the Indians.

The wagon party took only a very few days off to wash clothes and rest the oxen. It is said many of the women walked barefoot. One serious threat was when their water barrels began to get low, so an order was given: no more water. People and animals were rationed only one or two sips when it was really needed. It had been days since they crossed a stream and mountains were still some distance away. After they had almost given up hope of finding water, one of the teamsmen suddenly noticed his oxen raised their heads and sniffed the air. In good judgment, the teamsman gave the oxen their rein. They immediately left the trail, and on top of a knoll, under a large rock was a basin full of fresh water.

After leaving Fort Yuma, a Mrs. Warner, who had just buried a child en route in New Mexico, gave birth to another child. The family continued on to El Monte, in southern California. The Wills family broke away from the wagon train. The remaining wagon party traveled over the Tejon Pass and across the San Joaquin Valley to just below Millertown, where they crossed the San Joaquin River. They proceeded north, crossing Mariposa Creek and through the McDermott place, up Bear Creek, and on to Indian Gulch where they arrived on October 27, 1852. It was a long, arduous journey of living in tents and wagons for two years and enduring countless hardships. They sold milk from their herd to the miners.

In 1854, Andrew D. Cathey purchased a ranch from a Mr. Evans. Evans drove a hard bargain and Andrew finally agreed to pay him $1,500 for a quit-claim. This became Andrew and his wife Mary's first, new, real home. Her sons lived at home for about ten years before they all became larger independent landowners. Cathey's Valley now bears his name.

Andrew Cathey soon became very involved in civic and political activities. He enjoyed exhibiting his abundant produce in the Merced Fair. A few of his trees and vines are still standing, although very sparse after nearly 150 years.

Andrew and his wife, Mary, very devout Christians, helped build a church, school and cemetery on land they donated.

Recently a large mariposite stone monument was built by many donors and volunteer labor in memory and honor of the Andrew D Cathey family and history of Cathey's Valley. The monument is located at the Cathey's Valley Park. Visitors may read the early history plaque and see the 1879 one-room schoolhouse. The schoolhouse was restored by the Cathey's Valley Historical Society.

The first Catheys Valley post office opened in 1879 and closed in 1881. The Cathay post office opened in 1882, closed in 1918, re-opened in 1919, and changed its name to Catheys Valley in 1964.

== Geography ==
According to the United States Census Bureau, the CDP covers an area of 23.6 square miles (61.1 km^{2}), of which 0.06 square miles (0.16 km^{2}), or 0.24%, are water.

=== Climate ===
Catheys Valley is categorized as being within the 9a USDA hardiness zone, meaning temperatures can get as low as 20 to 25 °F (−7 to −4 °C).

Climate data for Catheys Valley, CA (1,325 feet above sea level)
Month	Jan	Feb	Mar	Apr	May	Jun	Jul	Aug	Sep	Oct	Nov	Dec	Year
Record high °F (°C)	75 (24)	79 (26)	88 (31)	98 (37)	106 (41)	111 (44)	112 (44)	110 (43)	108 (42)	102 (39)	91 (33)	73 (23)	112 (44)
Mean daily maximum °F (°C)	55.0 (12.8)	59.0 (15.0)	64.0 (17.8)	70.0 (21.1)	80.0 (26.7)	89.0 (31.7)	96.0 (35.6)	95.0 (35.0)	90.0 (32.2)	79.0 (26.1)	65.0 (18.3)	55.0 (12.8)	74.8 (23.8)
Daily mean °F (°C)	46.0 (7.8)	49.0 (9.4)	53.0 (11.7)	60.0 (15.6)	63.0 (17.2)	73.0 (22.8)	79.0 (26.1)	78.0 (25.6)	73.0 (22.8)	64.0 (17.8)	53.0 (11.7)	46.0 (7.8)	61.4 (16.4)
Mean daily minimum °F (°C)	37.0 (2.8)	39.0 (3.9)	42.0 (5.6)	45.0 (7.2)	51.0 (10.6)	57.0 (13.9)	62.0 (16.7)	61.0 (16.1)	56.0 (13.3)	49.0 (9.4)	41.0 (5.0)	37.0 (2.8)	48.1 (8.9)
Record low °F (°C)	13 (−11)	20 (−7)	20 (−7)	22 (−6)	30 (−1)	36 (2)	42 (6)	35 (2)	35 (2)	24 (−4)	20 (−7)	14 (−10)	13 (−11)
Average precipitation inches (mm)	3.39 (86)	3.20 (81)	2.79 (71)	1.65 (42)	0.68 (17)	0.13 (3.3)	0.04 (1.0)	0.07 (1.8)	0.30 (7.6)	1.02 (26)	2.80 (71)	3.56 (90)	19.63 (497.7)
Source: Weather Channel

== Demographics ==
Historical population
Census	Pop.	Note	%±
2010	825		—
2020	829		0.5%
U.S. Decennial Census; 1850–1870 1880-1890; 1900 1910 1920; 1930 1940 1950; 1960 1970 1980; 1990 2000 2010

Catheys Valley first appeared as a census designated place in the 2010 U.S. census.

=== 2020 census ===
As of the 2020 census, Catheys Valley had a population of 829. The population density was 35.1 inhabitants per square mile (13.6/km^{2}). The age distribution was 164 people (19.8%) under the age of 18, 49 people (5.9%) aged 18 to 24, 164 people (19.8%) aged 25 to 44, 248 people (29.9%) aged 45 to 64, and 204 people (24.6%) who were 65 years of age or older. The median age was 49.4 years. For every 100 females, there were 117.6 males, and for every 100 females age 18 and over there were 111.8 males age 18 and over.

0.0% of residents lived in urban areas, while 100.0% lived in rural areas.

The whole population lived in households. There were 343 households, out of which 75 (21.9%) had children under the age of 18 living in them, 170 (49.6%) were married-couple households, 18 (5.2%) were cohabiting couple households, 71 (20.7%) had a female householder with no partner present, and 84 (24.5%) had a male householder with no partner present. 105 households (30.6%) were one person, and 49 (14.3%) were one person aged 65 or older. The average household size was 2.42. There were 221 families (64.4% of all households).

There were 387 housing units at an average density of 16.4 units per square mile (6.3 units/km^{2}), of which 343 (88.6%) were occupied. Of these, 277 (80.8%) were owner-occupied, and 66 (19.2%) were occupied by renters. Of all housing units, 11.4% were vacant. The homeowner vacancy rate was 0.4% and the rental vacancy rate was 0.0%.

Racial composition as of the 2020 census
Race	Number	Percent
White	659	79.5%
Black or African American	5	0.6%
American Indian and Alaska Native	16	1.9%
Asian	11	1.3%
Native Hawaiian and Other Pacific Islander	0	0.0%
Some other race	50	6.0%
Two or more races	88	10.6%
Hispanic or Latino (of any race)	115	13.9%

== Politics ==
In the state legislature, Catheys Valley is in the 4th senatorial district, represented by Republican Marie Alvarado-Gil, and in the 8th Assembly district, represented by Republican David Tangipa.

In the United States House of Representatives, Catheys Valley is in California's 5th congressional district, represented by Republican Tom McClintock.

== Notable people ==
- Logan Mankins, former NFL player
