= Bear Valley, Mariposa County, California =

Census-designated place in Mariposa County, California

Bear Valley
- Census-designated place
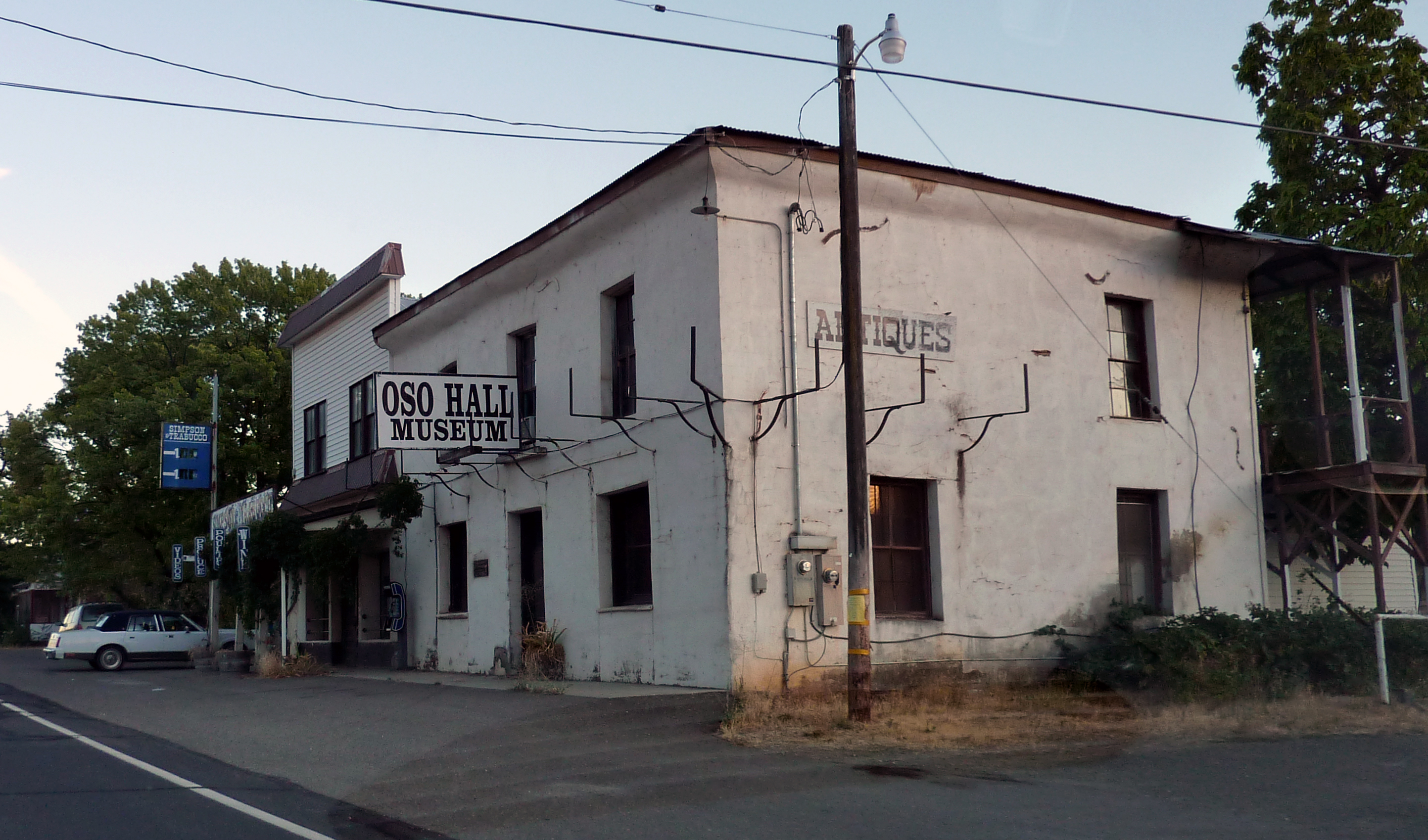
- Oso Hall Museum in Bear Valley

- Location within California Location within the United States
- Coordinates: 37°34′08″N 120°07′10″W
- Country: United States
- State: California
- County: Mariposa

Area
  - Land: 2.44 sq mi (6.32 km^{2})
  - Water: 0 sq mi (0.00 km^{2})
- Elevation: 2,054 ft (626 m)

Population (2020)
  - Total: 156
  - Density: 63.9/sq mi (24.7/km^{2})
- Time zone: UTC-8 (Pacific (PST))
  - Summer (DST): UTC-7 (PDT)
- ZIP Code: 95338 (Mariposa)
- FIPS Code: 06-04730
- GNIS feature ID: 2582941

California Historical Landmark
- Reference no.: 331

Bear Valley (formerly Haydenville, Biddle's Camp, Biddleville, Simpsonville, and Johnsonville) is a census-designated place in Mariposa County, California, United States. It is located 10.5 miles (16.9 km) south-southeast of Coulterville, at an elevation of 2,054 feet (626 m). Bear Valley has been designated California Historical Landmark #331. The population was 156 at the 2020 census.

== History ==
The community passed through several names before 1858. The original name, Haydenville, honored David, Charles, and William Hayden, gold miners. Biddle's Camp and Biddleville commemorated William C. Biddle; Simpsonville honored Robert Simpson, a local merchant; and Johnsonville recognized John F. Johnson. The name became Bear Valley in 1858.

The Haydenville post office opened before January 21, 1851, and closed in 1852. The Bear Valley post office operated from 1858 to 1912, from 1914 to 1919, and from 1933 to 1955.

In 1847, John C. Frémont, a veteran of the Bear Flag Revolt, decided to settle down in the San Francisco Bay Area. Desiring a ranch near San Jose, he sent $3,000 to the American consul Thomas O. Larkin. Instead of his intended purchase, he was sold Rancho Las Mariposas, consisting of 44,387 acres (179.6 km^{2}) in the southern Sierra Nevada foothills around Bear Valley. The original Mexican grant was a "floating grant", meaning the total acreage was fixed but the boundaries were not surveyed. When the California Gold Rush began in 1848, Frémont moved his grant's borders into the hills. Those hills proved to be lucrative, and his mining operations centered in Bear Valley.

At its peak, Bear Valley had a population of 3,000, including Chinese, Cornish, and Mexican residents. During 1850–60 when Frémont's Pine Tree and Josephine Mines were in operation, Frémont built a hotel called Oso House from lumber shipped around Cape Horn; the structure no longer stands. Frémont lived and worked in Bear Valley, and his large home was nicknamed the Little White House; it burned in 1866. In 1863, Frémont sold Rancho Las Mariposas for $6,000,000.

A fire in 1888 destroyed much of the town; subsequent rebuilding left several structures that survive today, including the Bon Ton Saloon, the Trabucco Store, the Odd Fellows Hall, a schoolhouse, and the remains of a jail.

== Geography ==
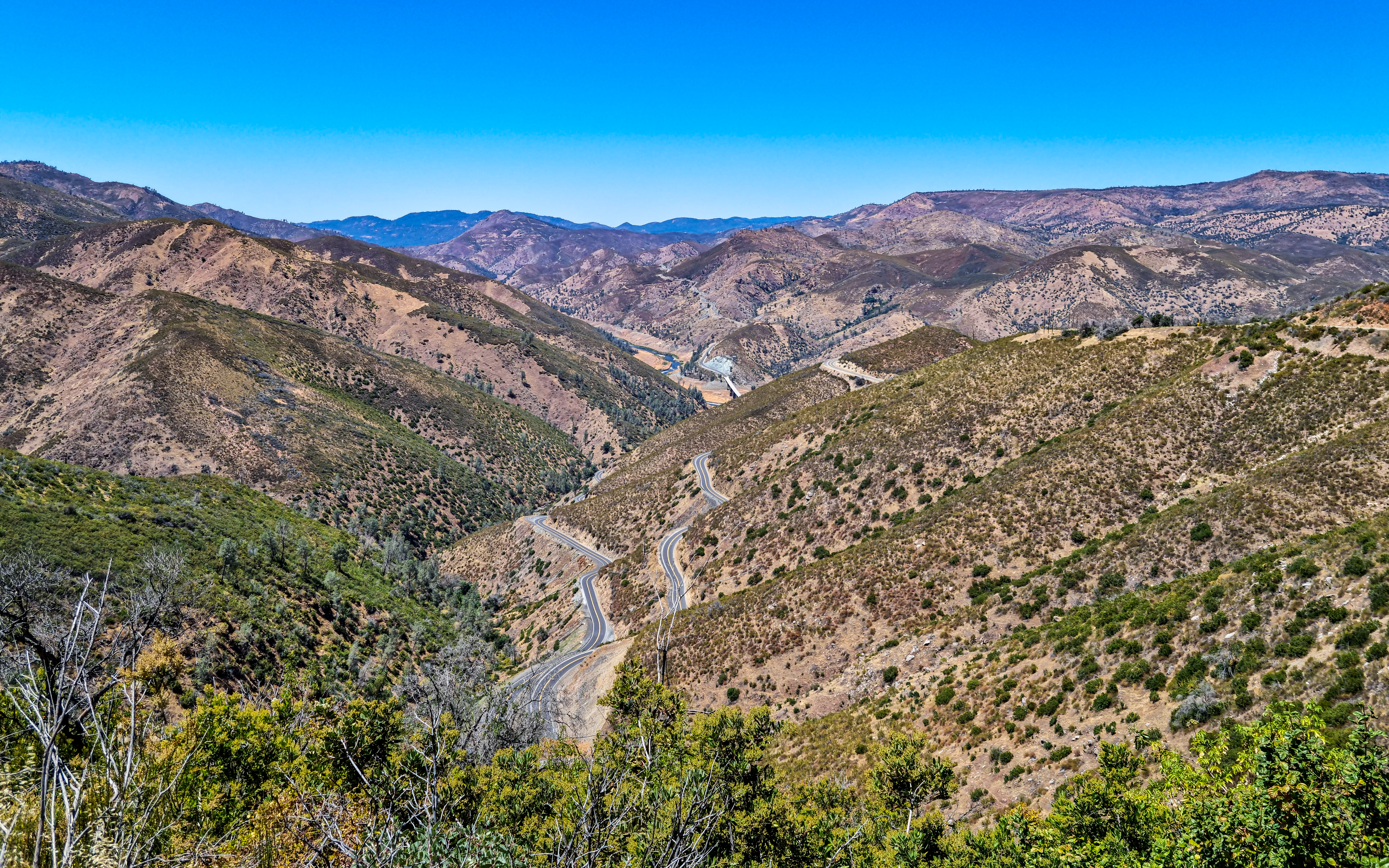
View of Bear Valley from Frémont's Fort Historical Marker.

Bear Valley is in west-central Mariposa County in the foothills of the Sierra Nevada. California State Route 49 passes through the community, leading southeast 11 miles (18 km) to Mariposa, the county seat, and northwest through the Merced River canyon 15 miles (24 km) to Coulterville. According to the United States Census Bureau, the CDP covers 2.44 square miles (6.32 km^{2}), of which 0.001 square miles (0.64 acres), or 0.04%, are water.

== Demographics ==
Historical population
| Census | Pop. | Note | %± |
|---|---|---|---|
| 2010 | 125 | | — |
| 2020 | 156 | | 24.8% |
U.S. Decennial Census; 1850–1870 1880-1890; 1900 1910 1920; 1930 1940 1950; 1960 1970 1980; 1990 2000 2010

Bear Valley first appeared as a census-designated place in the 2010 United States census.

The 2020 United States census reported that Bear Valley had a population of 156. The population density was 63.9 inhabitants per square mile (24.7/km^{2}). The racial makeup of Bear Valley was 113 (72%) White, 0 (0%) African American, 7 (4%) Native American, 0 (0%) Asian, 0 (0%) Pacific Islander, 9 (6%) from other races, and 27 (17%) from two or more races. Hispanic or Latino of any race were 34 persons (22%).

There were 49 households, out of which 16 (33%) included children under the age of 18, 29 (59%) were married-couple households, 1 (2%) was a cohabiting couple household, 14 (29%) had a female householder with no partner present, and 5 (10%) had a male householder with no partner present. 10 households (20%) were one person, and 7 (14%) were one person aged 65 or older. The average household size was 3.18. There were 39 families (80% of all households).

The age distribution was as follows: 56 people (36%) under the age of 18, 64 people (41%) aged 18 to 64, and 36 people (23%) who were 65 years of age or older. The median age was 33.0 years. There were 77 males and 79 females.

There were 62 housing units at an average density of 25.4 units per square mile (9.8 units/km^{2}), of which 49 (79%) were occupied. Of these, 100% were owner-occupied.
