= Mariposa County Courthouse =

- U.S. National Register of Historic Places
- California Historical Landmark
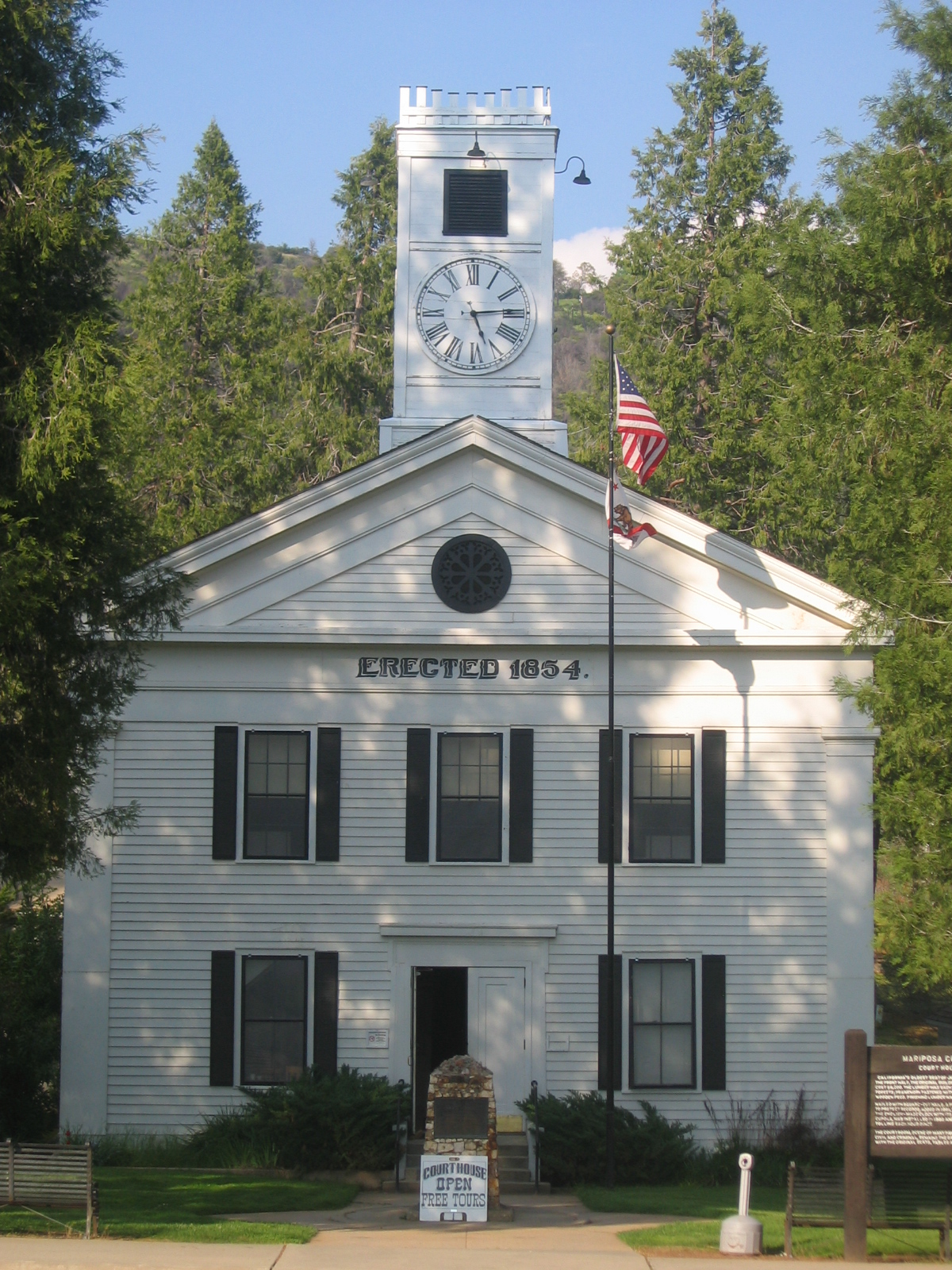
- Mariposa Courthouse, California, USA.

- Location within California Location within the United States
- Location: 5088 Bullion Street, Mariposa County, California
- Coordinates: 37°29′06″N 119°57′59″W
- Built: 1854
- Architect: Fox & Shriver
- Architectural style: Greek Revival
- NRHP reference No.: 77000306
- Added to NRHP: December 7, 1977

The Mariposa County Courthouse in Mariposa, California was built in 1854, making it the oldest courthouse in California. It was listed as a California Historical Landmark in 1977. The two-story building is still in full use as a courthouse to this day.

== Construction ==
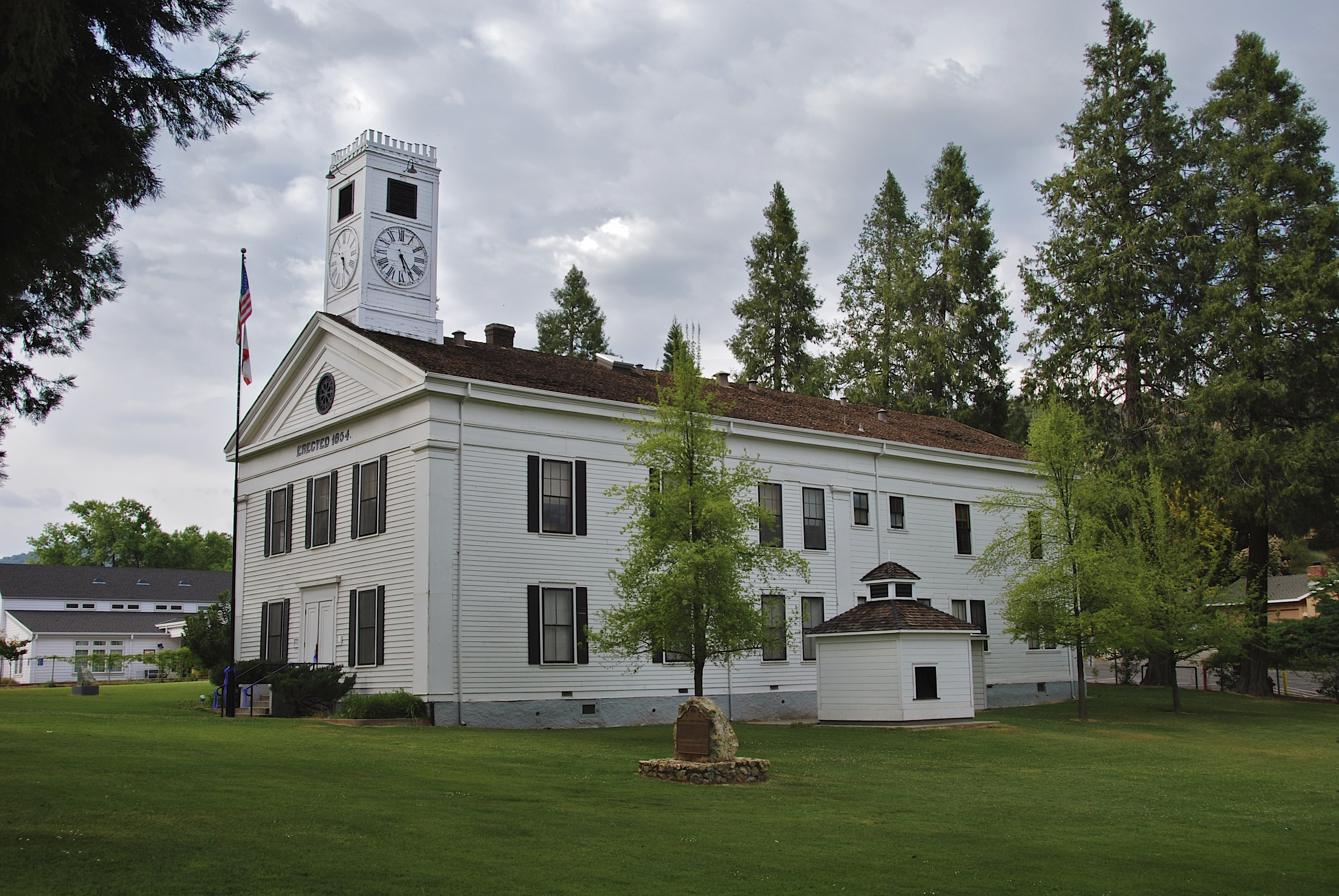
The Mariposa County Courthouse, 5088 Bullion Street, Mariposa, California

The Mariposa courthouse was designed and built by Fox & Shriver. It was finished in 1854. The total building costs came to $9,200. The first meeting was held on February 12, 1855. The clock and cupola were added in 1866. On April 21, 1929, the Yosemite Parlor No. 24, N.S.G.W., Merced, dedicated a quartz monument and bronze plaque in honor of the pioneers of Mariposa County.

== Historical significance ==
In 1851, Mariposa became home to many miners as the California Gold Rush began. This brought issues regarding mining laws, and there developed a necessity to have a place to try these disputes. The courthouse tried cases on other aspects of the laws, but it was the rulings on mining laws that set the courthouse apart from its counterparts. Legal precedents on federal mining laws were set based on rulings made here.

== See also ==
- California Historical Landmarks in Mariposa County
- National Register of Historic Places listings in Mariposa County, California
