= Mormon Bar, California =

Unincorporated community in California, United States

Mormon Bar
- Unincorporated community
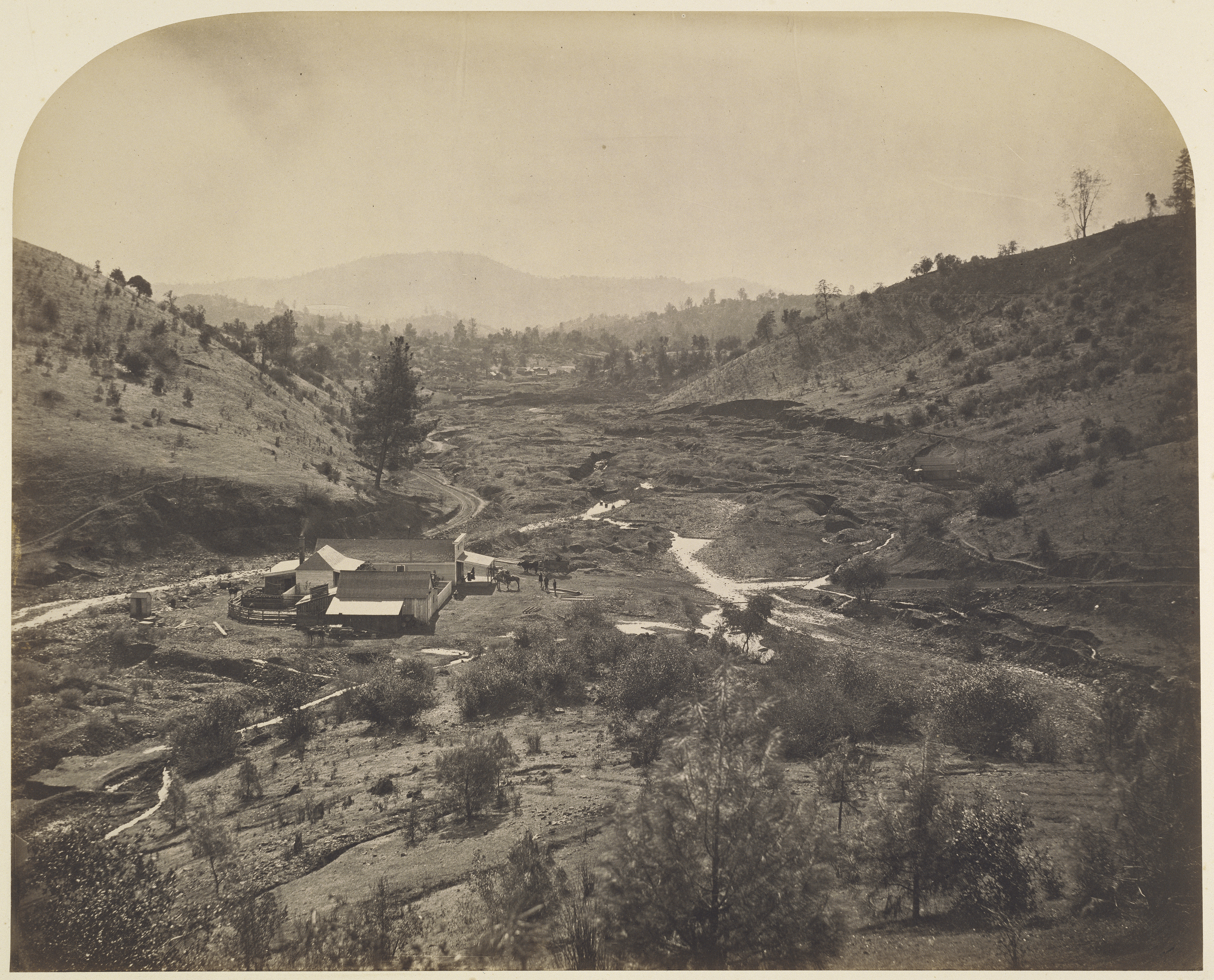
- A south view of Mormon Bar, c. between 1858 and 1860

- Location in California Mormon Bar (the United States)
- Coordinates: 37°27′44″N 119°56′53″W
- Country: United States
- State: California
- County: Mariposa
- Elevation: 1,772 ft (540 m)
- GNIS feature ID: 1659179

California Historical Landmark
- Reference no.: 323

Mormon Bar is an unincorporated community in Mariposa County, California, United States. It is located 2 miles (3.2 km) south-southeast of Mariposa, at an elevation of 1772 feet (540 m). Mormon Bar is located near State Route 49.

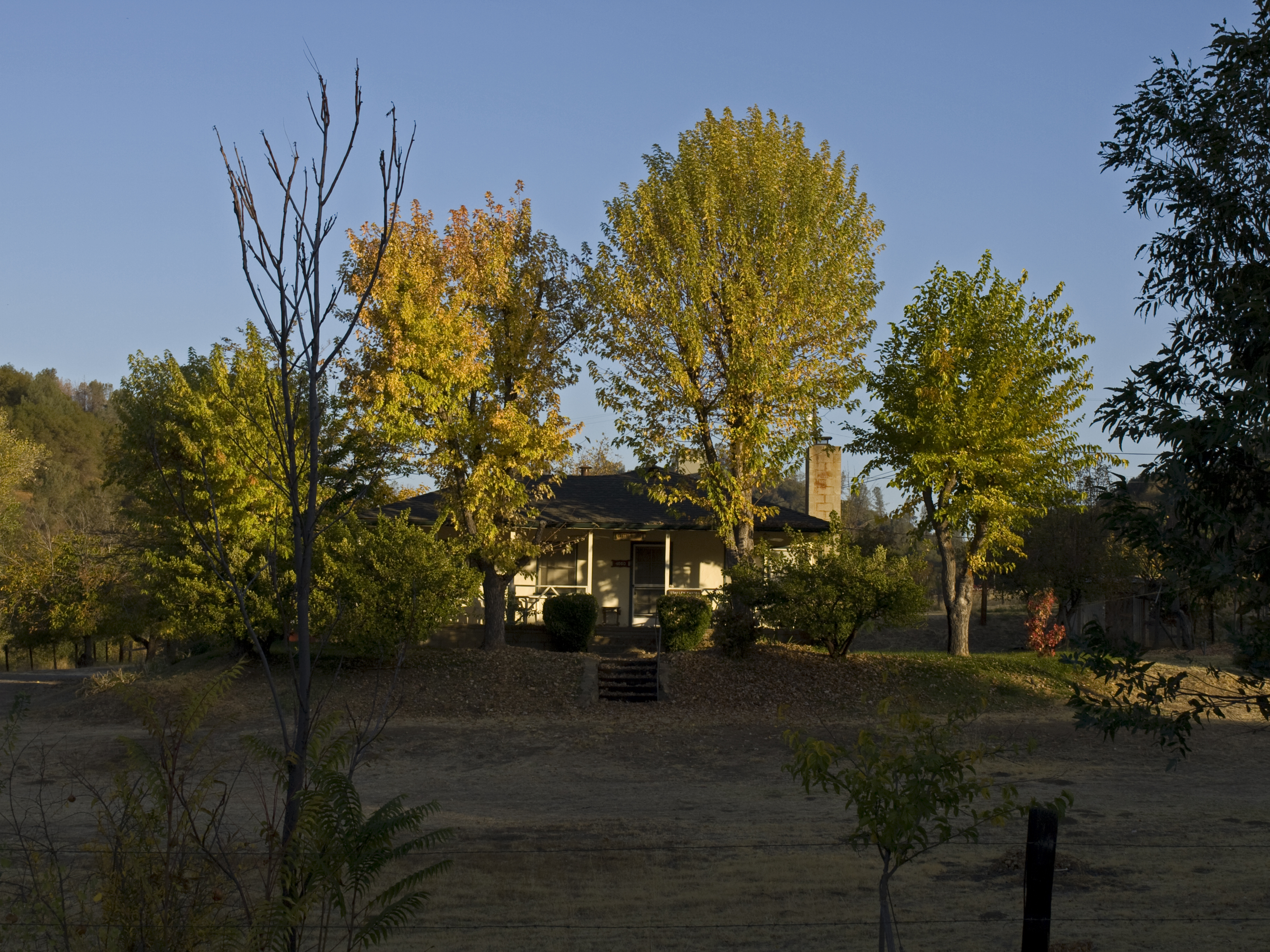
A standalone house at Mormon Bar

It was settled during the California Gold Rush. members of the Church of Jesus Christ of Latter-Day Saints occupied the place during the winter of 1849/50. It was first mined by veterans of the Mormon Battalion in 1849 after their discharge in 1847. They did not stay very long, and other miners came and occupied the site.

At one time there was a significant Chinese presence there.

Mormon Bar is California Historical Landmark #323.

It is somewhat of a ghost town, and is listed on many maps and ghost town travel guides as such.
