= Mariposa County, California =

County in California, United States

Coordinates: 37.58°N 119.91°W

Mariposa County
- County
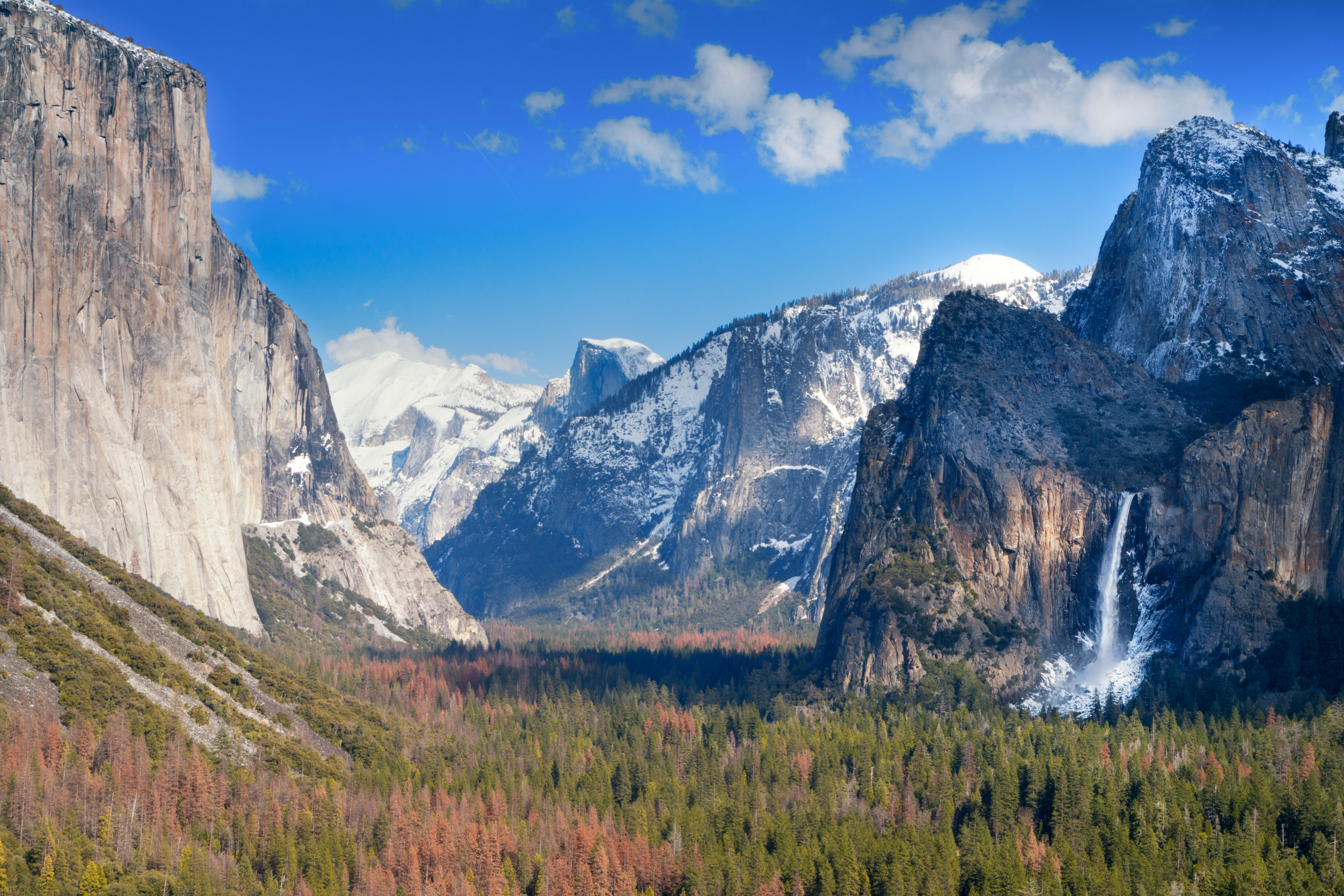
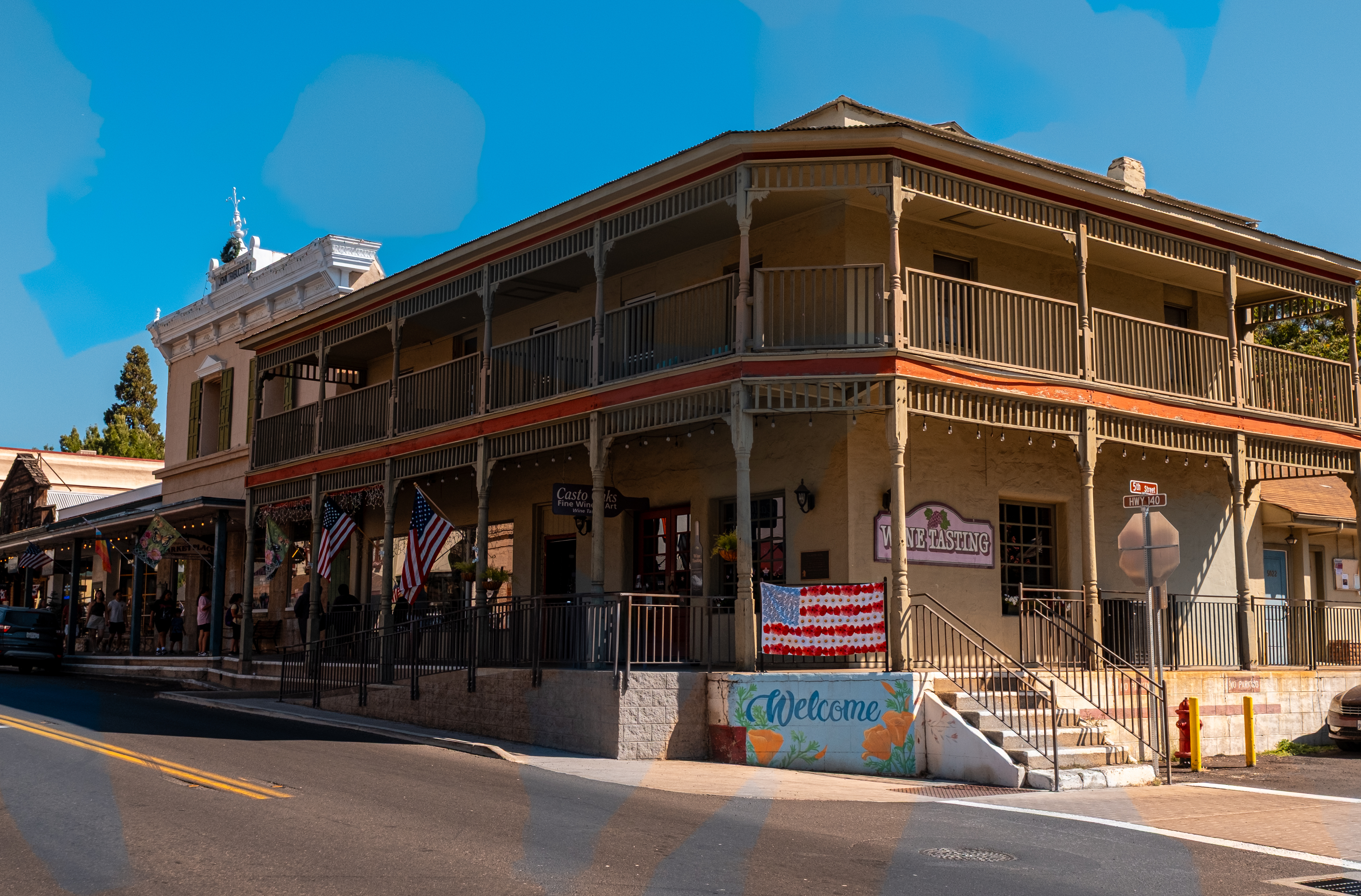
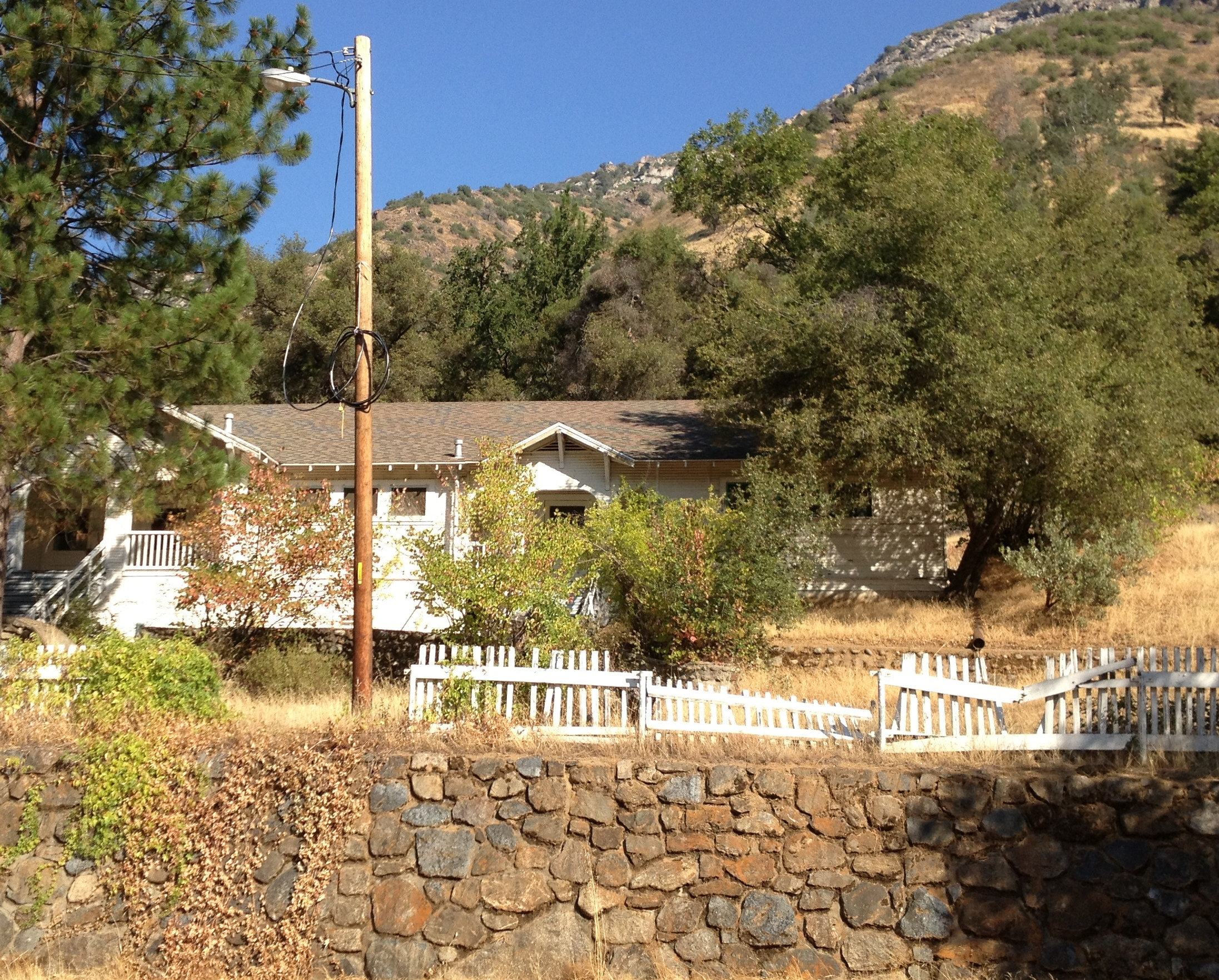
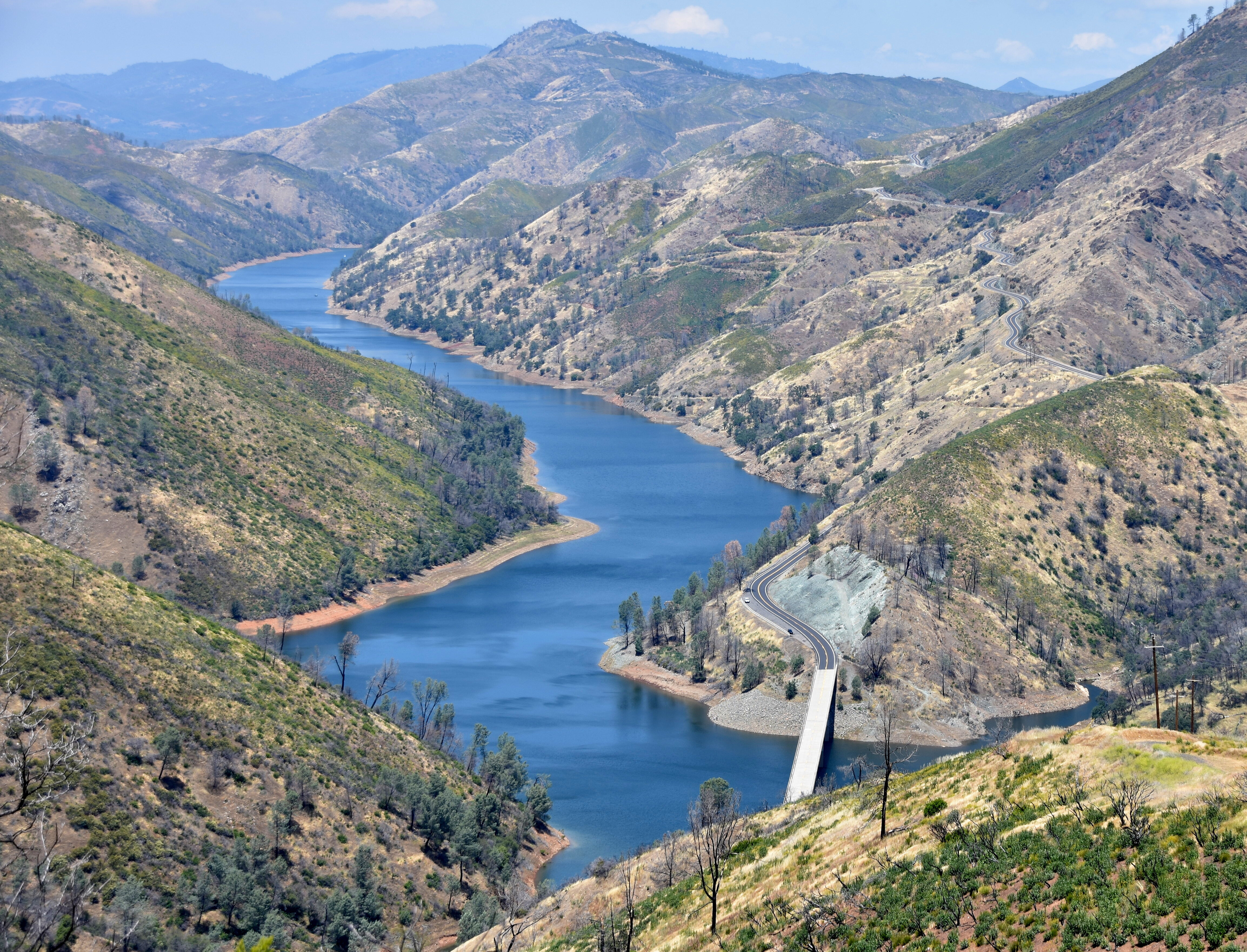
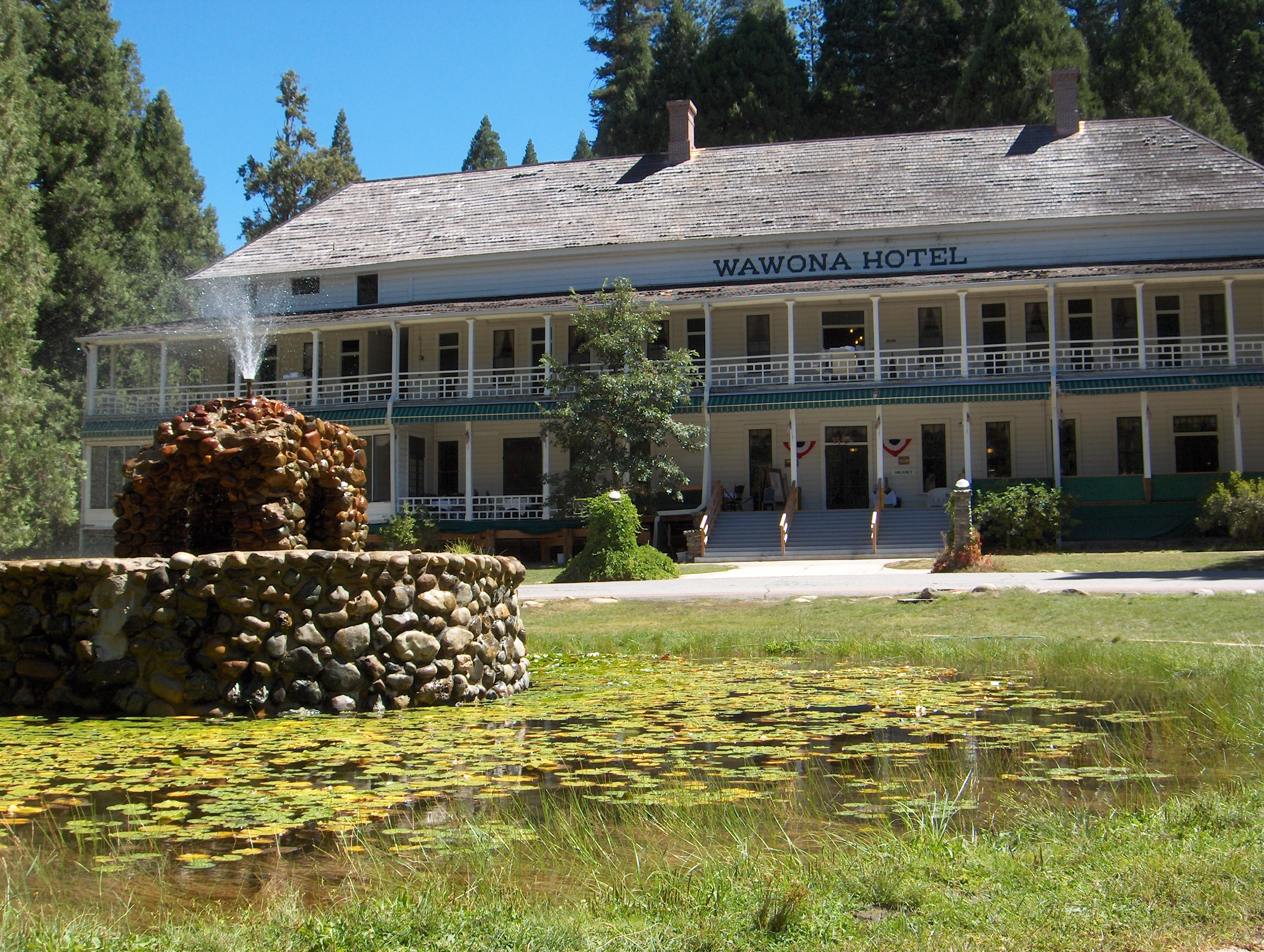
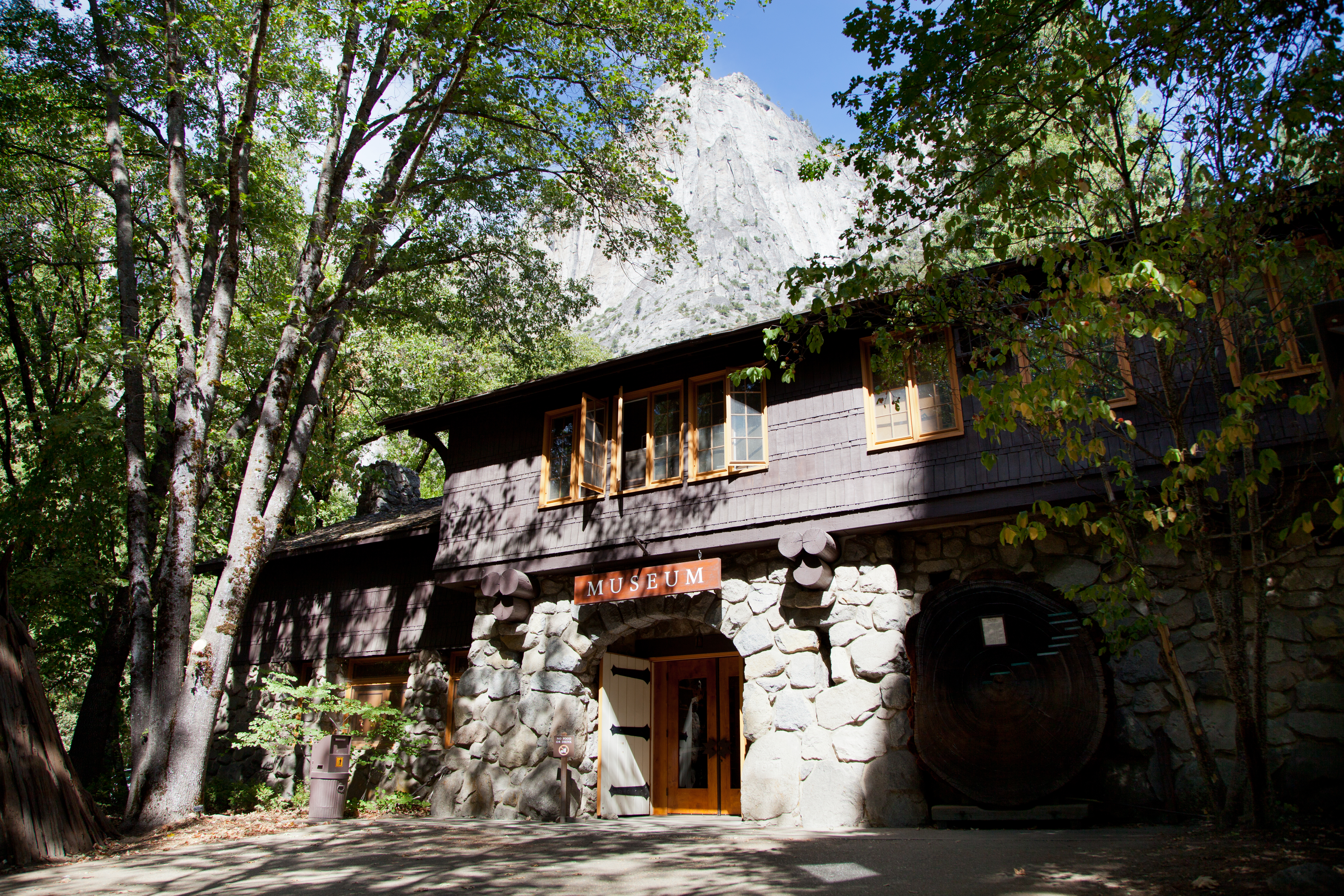
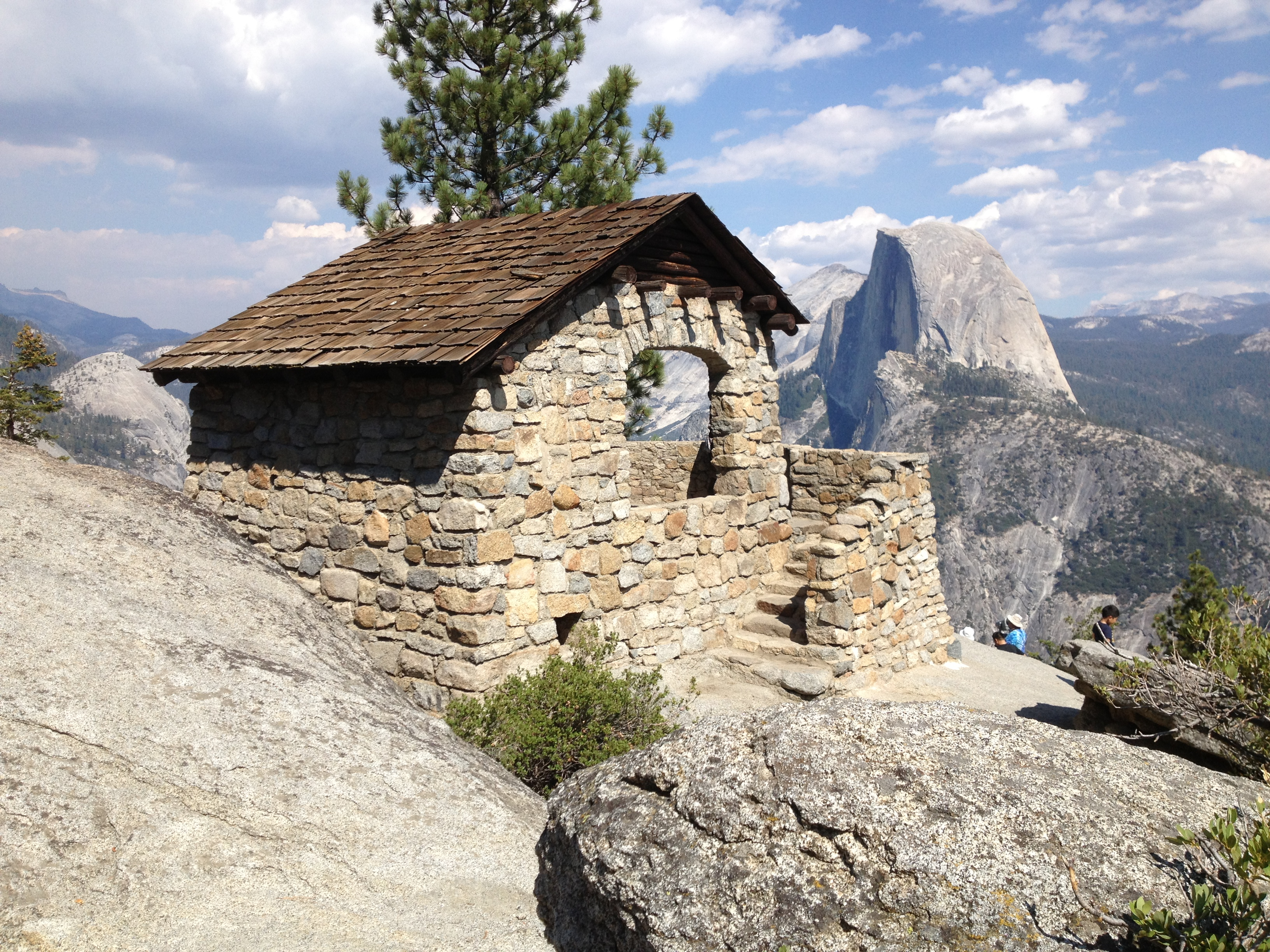
- Yosemite Valley in Yosemite National Park Mariposa El Portal Lake McClure Wawona Yosemite Village Glacier Point

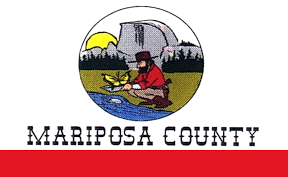
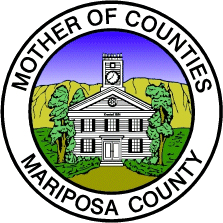
- Flag Seal

- Location in the state of California
- Interactive map of Mariposa County
- Country: United States
- State: California
- Region: Sierra Nevada
- Incorporated: February 18, 1850; 176 years ago
- Named for: Mariposa Creek, from mariposa (Spanish for "butterfly")
- County seat: Mariposa
- Largest community: Lake Don Pedro (population); Greeley Hill (area)

Government
  - Type: Council–CAO
  - Body: Board of Supervisors
  - Chair: Rosemarie Smallcombe
  - Vice Chair: Miles Menetrey
  - Board of Supervisors: Supervisors: Rosemarie Smallcombe; Shannon Poe; Danette Toso; Jenni Kiser; Miles Menetrey
  - County Administrative Officer: Joe Lynch

Area
  - Total: 1,463 sq mi (3,790 km^{2})
  - Land: 1,449 sq mi (3,750 km^{2})
  - Water: 14 sq mi (36 km^{2})
- Highest elevation: 12,040 ft (3,670 m)

Population (2020)
  - Total: 17,131
  - Estimate (2025): 16,918 ▼
  - Density: 11.82/sq mi (4.565/km^{2})

GDP
  - Total: $1.036 billion (2024)
- Time zone: UTC-8 (Pacific Standard Time)
  - Summer (DST): UTC-7 (Pacific Daylight Time)
- Congressional district: 5th
- Website: mariposacounty.gov

Mariposa County (/ˌmærɪˈpoʊzə, -sə/ Mariposa, Spanish for "Butterfly") is a county in the U.S. state of California. As of the 2020 U.S. census, the population was 17,131. The county seat is Mariposa. The county lies in the western foothills of the Sierra Nevada, north of Fresno, east of Merced, and southeast of Stockton. The eastern portion of the county encompasses the principal area of Yosemite National Park.

Mariposa County is one of only three counties in California that does not include any incorporated cities, along with Alpine and Trinity counties. The county includes 17 communities recognized as census-designated places for statistical purposes. It has no traffic signals anywhere within its borders.

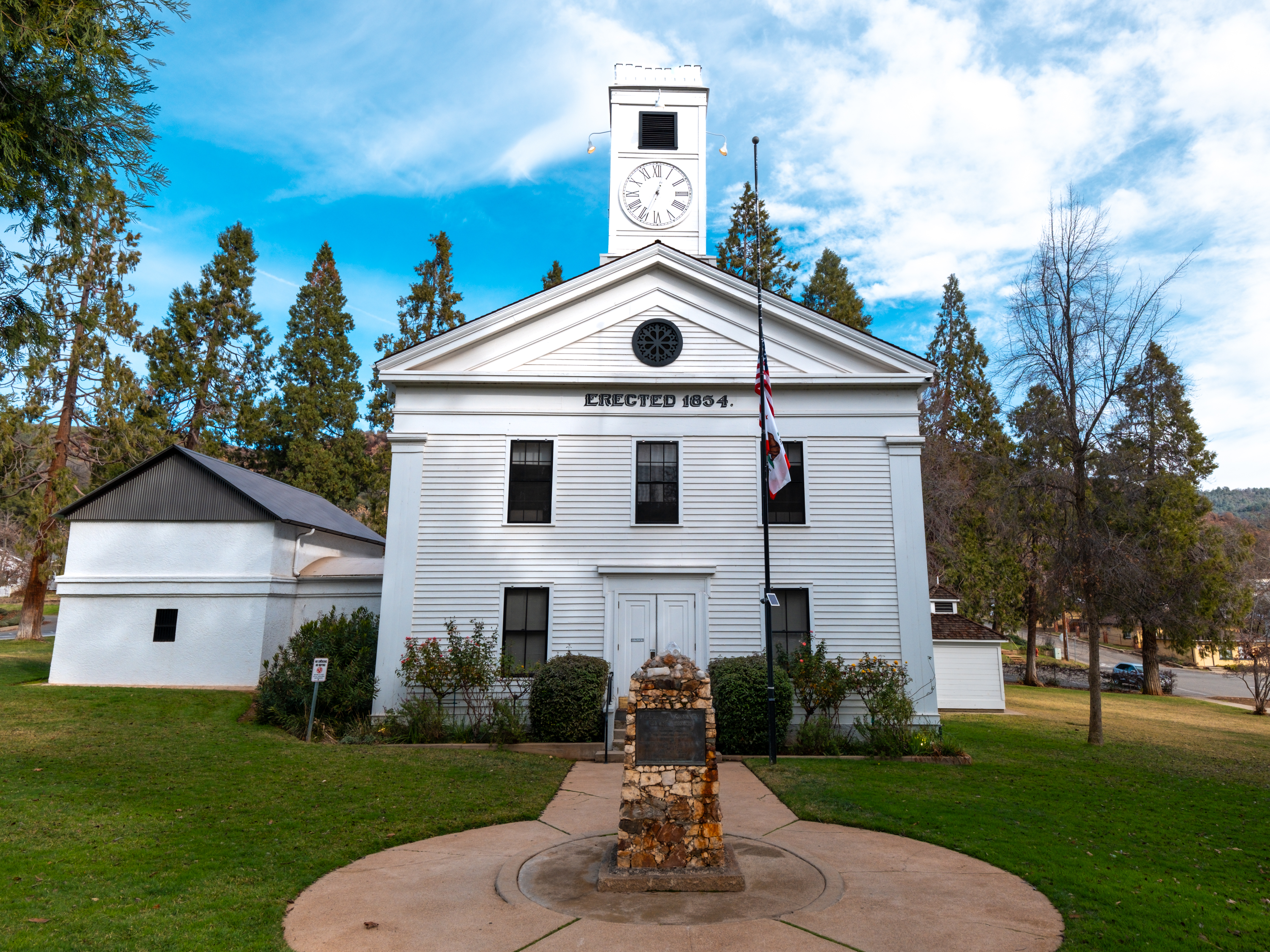
The Mariposa County Courthouse, built in 1854, is California's oldest court of law in continuous operation.

== History ==
The county took its name from Mariposa Creek, named by Spanish explorers in 1806 when they discovered a large cluster of butterflies (mariposas in Spanish) in the foothills of the Sierra Nevada. Each year on the first weekend in May, residents celebrate the county's butterfly namesake at the annual Mariposa Butterfly Festival.

At the time of statehood in 1850, Mariposa County was the largest of the original 27 California counties by area, covering over 30,000 square miles (78,000 km^{2}) or about one-fifth of the state. It became known as the "Mother of Counties" because its territory was ceded over time to eventually form all of present-day Merced, Madera, Fresno, Tulare, Kings, and Kern counties; and parts of present-day San Benito, Mono, Inyo, San Bernardino, and Los Angeles counties.

The county's original seat was a now-nonexistent hamlet known as Agua Fria (Spanish for "cold water"), about 3 miles (4.8 km) west of present-day Mariposa on Agua Fria Road. The county seat then moved to Mariposa in 1854, resulting in the construction of the Mariposa County Courthouse, California's oldest court of law in continuous operation, whose grounds occupy an entire block. The courthouse, fronted by Bullion Street with Jones Street to the rear and 9th and 10th Streets on either side, is depicted on the Mariposa County Seal.

=== Indigenous peoples ===
The territory now comprising Mariposa County was inhabited by the Southern Sierra Miwok, whose villages occupied the foothills and lower mountain slopes along the Merced, Tuolumne, and Chowchilla river drainages. The Yokuts occupied the San Joaquin Valley floor and adjacent foothills; early Spanish and American accounts applied the name "Mariposas" to the Yokuts bands near the creek. The two groups maintained trade relationships across the foothill boundary.

During the Gold Rush, the rapid expansion of mining camps into indigenous territories produced violent conflict. In December 1850, Governor John McDougal authorized the Mariposa Battalion, a state militia unit mustered on February 12, 1851, under Major James D. Savage. The battalion's pursuit of the Ahwahnechee leader Tenaya into the Sierra Nevada resulted in the first documented entry by non-indigenous people into Yosemite Valley, in March 1851. The conflict, known as the Mariposa War, ended with Tenaya's capture and the forced removal of Ahwahnechee to a reservation on the Fresno River.

=== Gold Rush ===
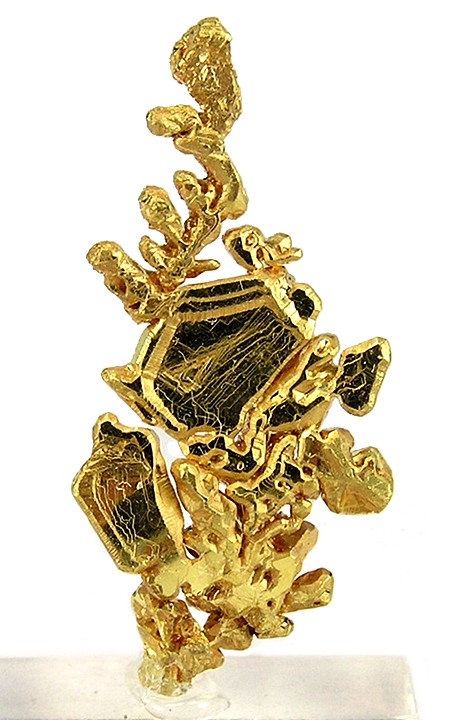
Specimen gold from the Mockingbird mine

Mariposa County lies at the southern end of California's Mother Lode region. During the California Gold Rush, large quantities of gold were found and extracted, first in local stream beds and later in hard-rock mines. One of the most notable beneficiaries was John C. Frémont, explorer and 1856 Republican presidential candidate, for whom the local hospital and Charles Street (more commonly known as "Highway 140") are named. Jessie Street in Mariposa is named for Frémont's wife, Jessie Benton Frémont, who accompanied him on extended visits to Las Mariposas between 1849 and 1861.

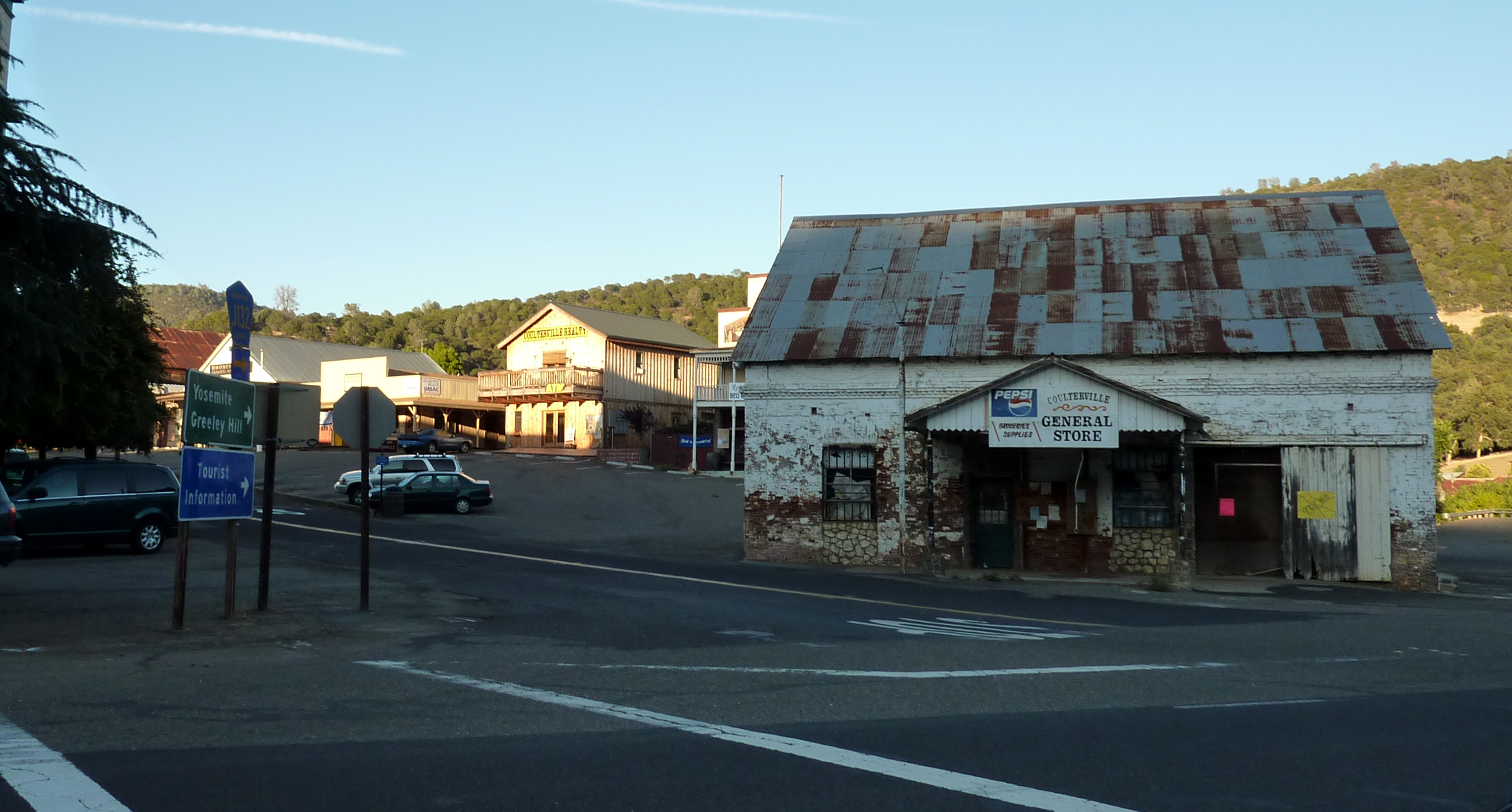
Buildings along the Coulterville Main Street Historic District

Many aspects of the area's mining history are depicted in exhibits at two local museums: the Mariposa History Museum in the town of Mariposa, and the California Mining and Mineral Museum at the Mariposa Fairgrounds, 2 miles (3.2 km) southeast of Mariposa on State Route 49.

The Coulterville Main Street Historic District, listed on the National Register of Historic Places in 1982, preserves 24 Gold Rush-era buildings along the main street of Coulterville.

Two small gold mines in Mariposa County, the Mockingbird mine and the Colorado Quartz mine, intermittently produce world-class specimens of crystalline gold for mineral collectors. "Specimens from these occurrences commonly have bright luster and rich color, with well-developed crystals in unusual and attractive arrangements." The best-known example is "The Dragon", on display at the Houston Museum of Natural Science.

Among the county's Gold Rush-era settlements, Cat Town gave its name to the Cat Town Mining District, a gold-bearing area in the western Sierra Nevada foothills catalogued by the California Division of Mines and Geology.

== Geography ==
According to the United States Census Bureau, the county has a total area of 1,463 square miles (3,790 km^{2}), of which 1,449 square miles (3,750 km^{2}) is land and 14 square miles (36 km^{2}) (1.0%) is water. The county extends:

- West from the western foothills of the Sierra Nevada to the edge of the Central Valley
- East into the Sierra including Yosemite Valley and a portion of the Cathedral Range

=== Water ===
Much of the Merced River's course lies within the county, including its whitewater runs through Yosemite and the Merced River Canyon. The canyon supports the only known population of the limestone salamander (Hydromantes brunus), a species endemic to a short stretch of the Merced River in Mariposa County. Becknell Creek is located near the historic community of Ben Hur.

There are several lakes within the county, including Lake McClure, Lake McSwain, Merced Lake, and Tenaya Lake.

=== Adjacent counties ===
- Tuolumne County – north
- Mono County – east
- Madera County – southeast
- Merced County – southwest
- Stanislaus County – west

=== National protected areas ===
- Sierra National Forest (part)
- Stanislaus National Forest (part)
- Yosemite National Park (part)

== Demographics ==
Historical population
Census	Pop.	Note	%±
1850	4,379		—
1860	6,243		42.6%
1870	4,572		−26.8%
1880	4,339		−5.1%
1890	3,787		−12.7%
1900	4,720		24.6%
1910	3,956		−16.2%
1920	2,775		−29.9%
1930	3,233		16.5%
1940	5,605		73.4%
1950	5,145		−8.2%
1960	5,064		−1.6%
1970	6,015		18.8%
1980	11,108		84.7%
1990	14,302		28.8%
2000	17,130		19.8%
2010	18,251		6.5%
2020	17,131		−6.1%
2025 (est.)	16,918	▼	−1.2%
U.S. Decennial Census; 1790–1960 1900–1990; 1990–2000 2010 2020

=== 2020 census ===
As of the 2020 census, the county had a population of 17,131. The median age was 52.1 years. 17.2% of residents were under 18 and 28.0% were 65 or older. For every 100 females there were 101.0 males, and for every 100 females age 18 and over there were 100.4 males.

There were 7,372 households, of which 22.6% had children under 18 living with them and 24.5% had a female householder with no spouse or partner present. About 30.1% of all households were made up of individuals, and 15.3% had someone living alone who was 65 or older.

There were 9,760 housing units, of which 24.5% were vacant. Among occupied housing units, 72.1% were owner-occupied and 27.9% were renter-occupied. The homeowner vacancy rate was 1.9% and the rental vacancy rate was 5.7%.

The racial makeup of the county was 78.1% White, 0.6% Black or African American, 2.9% American Indian and Alaska Native, 1.7% Asian, 0.1% Native Hawaiian and Pacific Islander, 4.6% from some other race, and 11.9% from two or more races. Hispanic or Latino residents of any race comprised 12.5% of the population.

100% of residents lived in rural areas.

=== Racial and ethnic composition ===
Mariposa County, California – Racial and ethnic composition Note: the US Census treats Hispanic/Latino as an ethnic category. This table excludes Latinos from the racial categories and assigns them to a separate category. Hispanics/Latinos may be of any race.
Race / Ethnicity (NH = Non-Hispanic)	Pop 1980	Pop 1990	Pop 2000	Pop 2010	Pop 2020	% 1980	% 1990	% 2000	% 2010	% 2020
White alone (NH)	10,099	12,771	14,539	15,192	12,838	90.92%	89.30%	84.87%	83.24%	74.94%
Black or African American alone (NH)	70	120	111	129	105	0.63%	0.84%	0.65%	0.71%	0.61%
Native American or Alaska Native alone (NH)	357	593	530	459	410	3.21%	4.15%	3.09%	2.51%	2.39%
Asian alone (NH)	55	113	120	201	287	0.50%	0.79%	0.70%	1.10%	1.68%
Native Hawaiian or Pacific Islander alone (NH)	x	x	17	26	15	0.10%	0.14%	0.10%	0.14%	0.09%
Other race alone (NH)	23	8	21	22	114	0.21%	0.06%	0.12%	0.12%	0.67%
Mixed race or multiracial (NH)	x	x	463	546	1,222	x	x	2.70%	2.99%	7.13%
Hispanic or Latino (any race)	504	697	1,329	1,676	2,140	4.54%	4.87%	7.76%	9.18%	12.49%
Total	11,108	14,302	17,130	18,251	17,131	100.00%	100.00%	100.00%	100.00%	100.00%

=== American Community Survey 2025 data ===
The United States Census Bureau estimated that in 2025, Mariposa County’s population was 16.918. It was also estimated that the county's population was 71,89% Non-Hispanic White, 17,08% Hispanic or Latino, 1,13% Non-Hispanic Black, 2,12% Asian, 2,29% Native American, 0,15% Pacific Islander, and 5,34% Multiracial.

Total	Population	Percentage
Non-Hispanic White	12.162	71,89%
Hispanic or Latino	2.890	17,08%
Non-Hispanic Black	191	1,13%
Asian	358	2,12%
Native American	387	2,29%
Pacific Islander	26	0,15%
Non-Hispanic Multiracial	904	5,34%

=== Ancestry ===
According to the American Community Survey 2019–2023 five-year estimates, the largest self-reported ancestry groups in Mariposa County were English (16.6%), Irish (15.9%), German (15.3%), Italian (6.1%), French (3.5%), "American" (3.2%), Portuguese (2.5%), and Swedish (2.3%).

=== 2010 census ===
The 2010 United States census reported that Mariposa County had a population of 18,251. The racial makeup was 16,103 (88.2%) White, 138 (0.8%) African American, 527 (2.9%) Native American, 204 (1.1%) Asian, 26 (0.1%) Pacific Islander, 508 (2.8%) from other races, and 745 (4.1%) from two or more races. Hispanic or Latino of any race were 1,676 persons (9.2%).

Population reported at 2010 United States census
The County	Total; Population	White	African; American	Native; American	Asian	Pacific; Islander	other races	two or more races	Hispanic or Latino (of any race)
Mariposa County	18,251	16,103	138	527	204	26	508	745	1,676
Census-designated place	Total; Population	White	African; American	Native; American	Asian	Pacific; Islander	other races	two or more races	Hispanic or Latino (of any race)
Bear Valley	125	117	0	1	2	0	1	4	8
Bootjack	960	811	2	34	11	0	31	71	76
Buck Meadows	31	23	0	0	0	0	5	3	7
Catheys Valley	825	730	6	12	12	1	33	31	80
Coulterville	201	181	0	5	1	0	0	14	20
El Portal	474	434	1	9	5	0	5	20	28
Fish Camp	59	57	0	0	1	0	0	1	3
Greeley Hill	915	847	7	14	1	6	11	29	53
Hornitos	75	66	0	2	1	0	0	6	5
Lake Don Pedro	1,077	979	7	18	12	2	18	41	109
Mariposa	2,173	1,895	10	105	30	0	59	74	215
Midpines	1,204	990	4	63	7	0	97	43	208
Wawona	169	138	2	3	4	0	8	14	12
Yosemite Valley	1,035	831	28	31	31	7	70	37	123
Other unincorporated areas	Total; Population	White	African; American	Native; American	Asian	Pacific; Islander	other races	two or more races	Hispanic or Latino (of any race)
All others not CDPs (combined)	8,928	8,004	71	230	86	10	170	357	729

=== 2000 census ===
As of the 2000 census, there were 17,130 people, 6,613 households, and 4,490 families residing in the county. The population density was 12 people per square mile (4.6 people/km^{2}). There were 8,826 housing units at an average density of 6 units per square mile (2.3 units/km^{2}). The racial makeup of the county was 88.9% White, 0.7% Black or African American, 3.5% Native American, 0.7% Asian, 0.1% Pacific Islander, 2.7% from other races, and 3.4% from two or more races. 7.8% of the population were Hispanic or Latino of any race. 17.8% were of German, 13.4% English, 12.7% Irish, and 6.7% American ancestry according to Census 2000. 96.0% spoke English and 3.5% Spanish as their first language.

There were 6,613 households, of which 25.6% had children under 18, 55.8% were married couples living together, 8.0% had a female householder with no husband present, and 32.1% were non-families. 26.5% of all households were made up of individuals, and 11.2% had someone living alone who was 65 or older. The average household size was 2.37 and the average family size was 2.86.

The population was spread out, with 21.6% under 18, 6.9% from 18 to 24, 25.1% from 25 to 44, 29.2% from 45 to 64, and 17.2% who were 65 or older. The median age was 43 years. For every 100 females there were 104.7 males. For every 100 females age 18 and over, there were 105.4 males.

The median income for a household was $34,626, and the median income for a family was $42,655. Males had a median income of $31,194 versus $25,440 for females. The per capita income was $18,190. About 10.5% of families and 14.8% of the population were below the poverty line, including 16.5% of those under 18 and 9.0% of those 65 or over.

== Government and policing ==
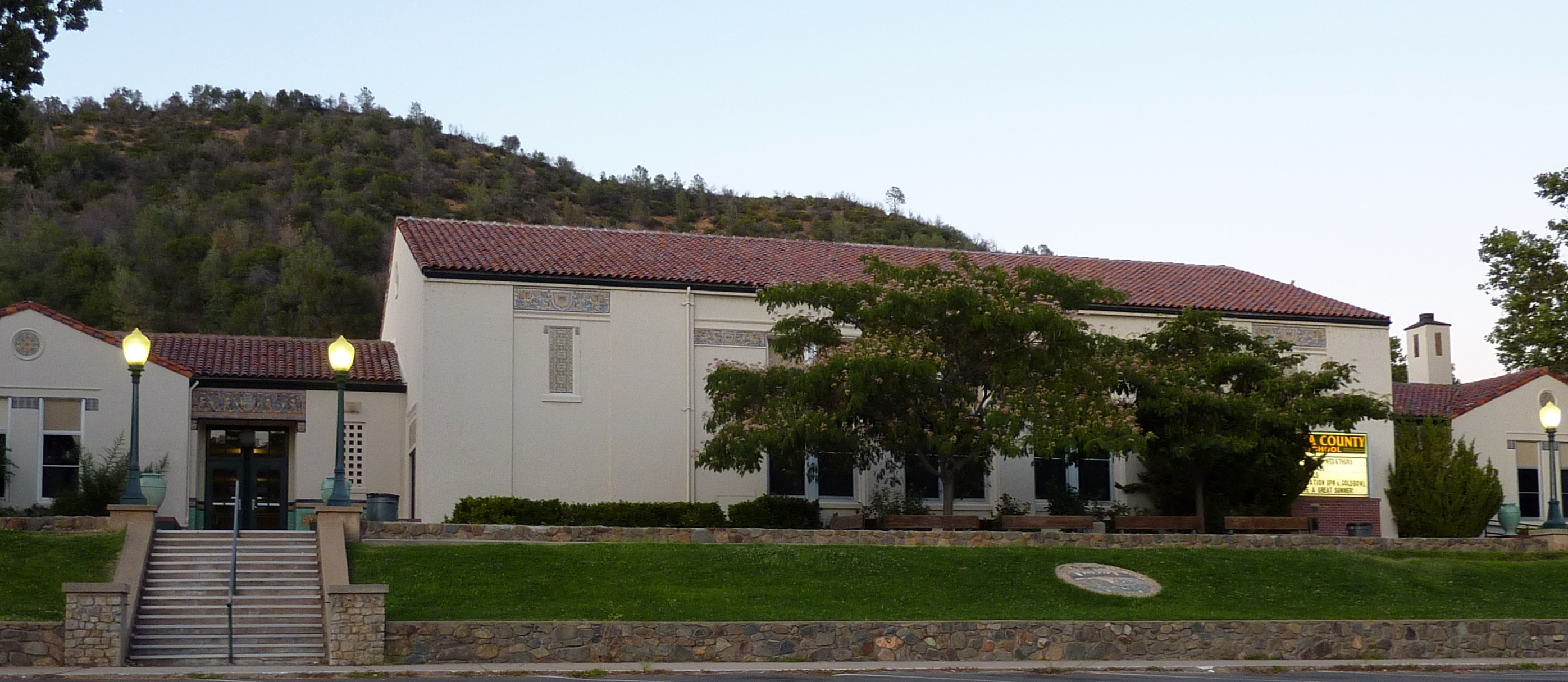
Historic Spanish Colonial Revival style Mariposa County High School, built in 1914

The Government of Mariposa County is defined and authorized under the California Constitution and law as a general law county. The county government is composed of the Board of Supervisors, which has legislative and executive power. The board consists of five members elected from five separate districts on a nonpartisan basis to serve four-year staggered terms.

=== State and federal representation ===
In the California State Legislature, Mariposa County is in the 4th senatorial district, represented by Republican Marie Alvarado-Gil, and in the 8th Assembly district, represented by Republican David Tangipa.

In the United States House of Representatives, Mariposa County is in California's 5th congressional district, represented by Republican Tom McClintock.

In its early history, Mariposa was one of the most reliably Democratic counties in California. Along with Colusa County, it was one of only two counties in the Pacific States to support Alton B. Parker in 1904. Over time the county steadily moved away from its Democratic roots, seen demonstrably in 1948 when Thomas E. Dewey won Mariposa without carrying California, as part of a trend turning the Great Basin into a Republican stronghold. Mariposa is now a strongly Republican county in presidential and congressional elections. The last Democrat to win a majority was Lyndon B. Johnson in 1964; the last Democrat to carry the county was Bill Clinton in 1992, who won a plurality by 41 votes.

United States presidential election results for Mariposa County, California
Year	Republican		Democratic		Third party(ies)	
Year	No.	%	No.	%	No.	%
1892	404	39.92%	526	51.98%	82	8.10%
1896	563	39.68%	829	58.42%	27	1.90%
1900	505	40.79%	717	57.92%	16	1.29%
1904	461	42.88%	486	45.21%	128	11.91%
1908	352	36.86%	480	50.26%	123	12.88%
1912	20	1.71%	689	58.89%	461	39.40%
1916	451	32.75%	802	58.24%	124	9.01%
1920	484	55.38%	320	36.61%	70	8.01%
1924	344	40.23%	168	19.65%	343	40.12%
1928	656	55.03%	517	43.37%	19	1.59%
1932	560	27.48%	1,386	68.01%	92	4.51%
1936	621	24.23%	1,907	74.40%	35	1.37%
1940	1,035	34.47%	1,935	64.44%	33	1.10%
1944	965	44.16%	1,203	55.06%	17	0.78%
1948	1,378	55.86%	983	39.85%	106	4.30%
1952	2,214	65.91%	1,102	32.81%	43	1.28%
1956	1,577	60.31%	1,031	39.43%	7	0.27%
1960	1,599	53.97%	1,338	45.16%	26	0.88%
1964	1,264	42.59%	1,704	57.41%	0	0.00%
1968	1,496	49.92%	1,187	39.61%	314	10.48%
1972	2,122	56.15%	1,487	39.35%	170	4.50%
1976	2,012	46.61%	2,093	48.48%	212	4.91%
1980	3,082	54.96%	1,889	33.68%	637	11.36%
1984	3,989	61.20%	2,399	36.81%	130	1.99%
1988	3,768	54.53%	2,998	43.39%	144	2.08%
1992	2,982	35.98%	3,023	36.48%	2,282	27.54%
1996	3,976	50.02%	2,920	36.73%	1,053	13.25%
2000	4,727	58.55%	2,816	34.88%	531	6.58%
2004	5,215	60.23%	3,251	37.55%	192	2.22%
2008	5,298	54.90%	4,100	42.48%	253	2.62%
2012	5,140	57.11%	3,498	38.87%	362	4.02%
2016	5,185	58.41%	3,122	35.17%	570	6.42%
2020	5,950	57.88%	4,088	39.77%	242	2.35%
2024	5,625	59.15%	3,622	38.09%	262	2.76%

On November 4, 2008, Mariposa County voted 62.1% for Proposition 8, which amended the California Constitution to define marriage as between a man and a woman.

=== Voter registration ===
Population and registered voters
Eligible voters	13,755	
Registered voters	11,958	86.9%
Democratic	3,199	26.8%
Republican	5,657	47.3%
Democratic–Republican spread	-2,458	-20.6%
American Independent	673	5.6%
Green	58	0.5%
Libertarian	187	1.6%
Peace and Freedom	44	0.4%
Other	135	1.1%
No party preference	2,005	16.8%

== Economy ==
Tourism is the dominant industry in Mariposa County, driven by proximity to Yosemite National Park. Visitors spent $433.2 million in the county in 2023, according to the Yosemite Mariposa County Tourism Bureau. Public administration, accommodation and food services, and educational services are the largest employment sectors by worker count. The median household income was $65,378 in 2023.

Gold mining, once the economic foundation of the county, continues on a small scale; the Mockingbird and Colorado Quartz mines intermittently produce collector-grade crystalline gold specimens.

== Crime ==
The following table includes the number of incidents reported and the rate per 1,000 persons for each type of offense in 2023.

Population and crime rates (2023)
Population	17,060	
Violent crime	99	5.80
Homicide	0	0.00
Forcible rape	15	0.88
Robbery	3	0.18
Aggravated assault	81	4.75
Property crime	253	14.83
Burglary	53	3.11
Larceny-theft	180	10.55
Motor vehicle theft	20	1.17
Arson	0	0.00

== Healthcare ==
Mariposa County has one hospital, the John C. Fremont Healthcare District, a 34-bed general acute care facility in the county seat of Mariposa with a 24-hour emergency department.

In 2013, Mariposa County had the highest rate of child abuse and neglect in California. In 2014, the county had the second-highest rate of unvaccinated schoolchildren in the state.

== Education ==
The Mariposa County Unified School District serves all public school students in Mariposa County. Because the county contains only one district, MCUSD also functions as the county office of education. No community college campus is located within the county; residents primarily access higher education through Columbia College in Sonora, part of the Yosemite Community College District.

== Media ==
Mariposa County primarily receives Fresno television and radio stations.

Local media outlets include:

- Mariposa Gazette—published since 1854, one of the oldest continuously published weekly newspapers in California
- Sierra Sun Times—an online publication covering Mariposa County and the Yosemite region, published continuously since 2004

== Transportation ==
=== Major highways ===
- State Route 41
- State Route 49
- State Route 120
- State Route 132
- State Route 140

=== Public transportation ===
- Mariposa County Transit provides dial-a-ride and some fixed-route service.
- Yosemite Area Regional Transportation System (YARTS) provides service along State Routes 120 and 140 to Yosemite National Park.
- Amtrak Thruway: Route 15A connects Mariposa with Merced station and Yosemite with five trips daily.

=== Airports ===
Mariposa-Yosemite Airport is a general aviation airport. The nearest airports with scheduled commercial service are Fresno and Merced.

== Communities ==
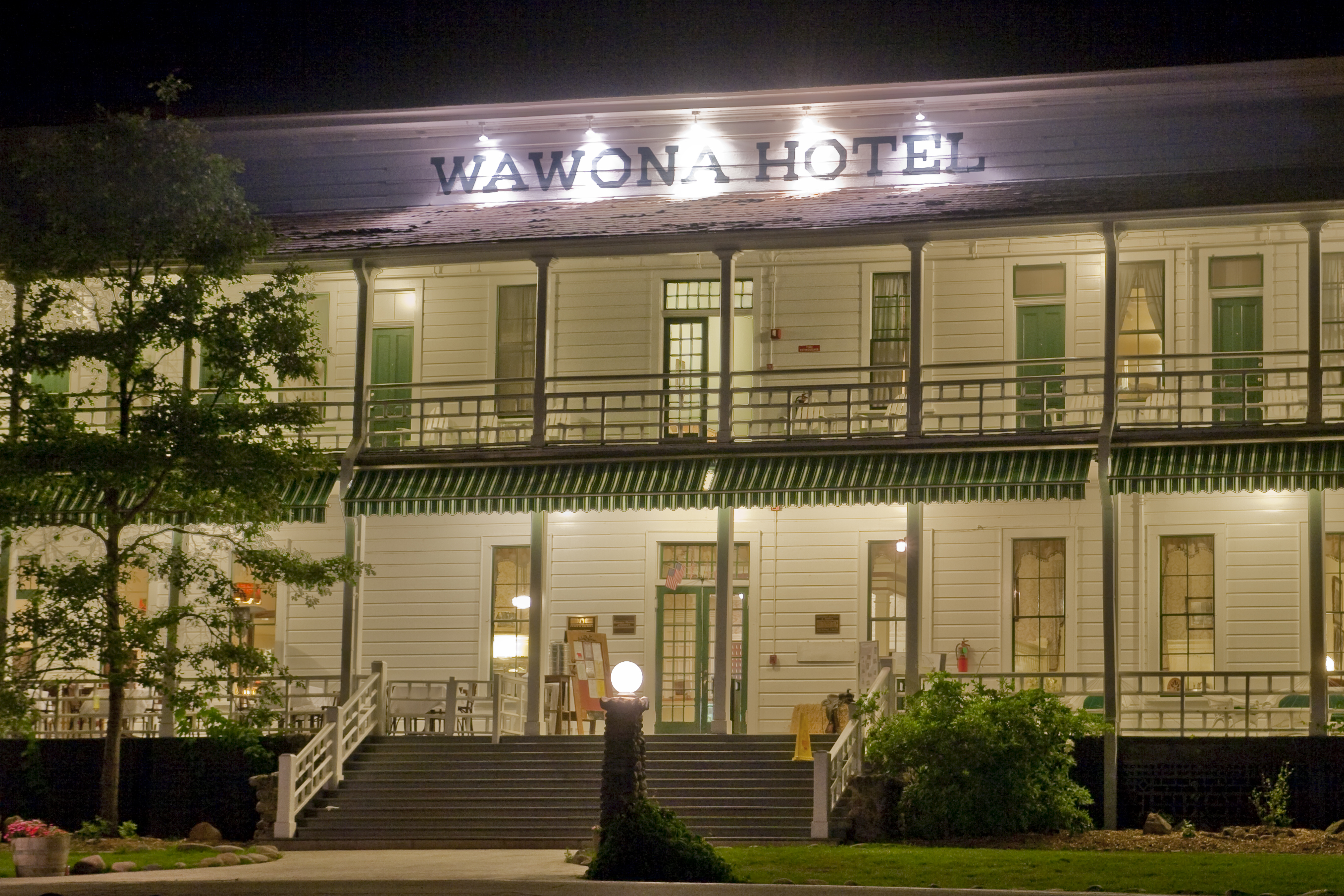
The historic Wawona Hotel, built in 1876

=== Census-designated places ===
- Bear Valley
- Bootjack
- Buck Meadows
- Catheys Valley
- Coulterville
- El Portal
- Fish Camp
- Foresta (Note: Formerly known as the Crane Creek CDP; renamed in 2022.)
- Greeley Hill
- Hornitos
- Lake Don Pedro
- Mariposa (county seat)
- Midpines
- Mount Bullion
- Wawona
- Yosemite Valley
- Yosemite West

=== Unincorporated communities ===
- Jerseydale
- Lushmeadows
- Mormon Bar

=== Ghost towns ===
- Agua Fria
- Bagby
- Ben Hur
- Briceburg
- Bridgeport

=== Population ranking ===
The population ranking of the following table is based on the 2020 census of Mariposa County.

† county seat

Rank	City/Town/etc.	Municipal type	Population (2020 census)
1	Lake Don Pedro	CDP	1,765
2	† Mariposa	CDP	1,526
3	Greeley Hill	CDP	927
4	Catheys Valley	CDP	829
5	Bootjack	CDP	661
6	Midpines	CDP	379
7	El Portal	CDP	372
8	Yosemite Valley	CDP	337
9	Bear Valley	CDP	156
10	Mount Bullion	CDP	154
11	Coulterville	CDP	115
12	Wawona	CDP	111
13	Fish Camp	CDP	49
14	Yosemite West	CDP	47
15	Hornitos	CDP	38
16	Foresta	CDP	29
17	Buck Meadows	CDP	21

== See also ==
- List of school districts in Mariposa County, California
- Mariposa Battalion
- Mariposa War
- National Register of Historic Places listings in Mariposa County, California
- Valley and Sierra Miwok people
- Yokuts people (Mariposan)
