= Jerseydale, California =

Unincorporated community in California, United States

Jerseydale
- Unincorporated community
- Location in California Jerseydale (the United States)
- Coordinates: 37°33′49″N 119°51′27″W
- Country: United States
- State: California
- County: Mariposa
- Elevation: 3,779 ft (1,152 m)
- GNIS feature ID: 1659737

Jerseydale is an unincorporated community in Mariposa County, California, United States. It is located 9 miles (14 km) south-southwest of El Portal, at an elevation of 3779 feet (1152 m).

A post office operated at Jerseydale from 1889 to 1930.

Jerseydale was predominantly a gold mining community during the latter part of the nineteenth century. In later years it became a significant apple-growing district. Jerseydale is now the site of a Forest Service station and a fire station. The area is known for exceptionally heavy rainfall during winter storms.
