= Bank (card game) =

"Polish Bank" or "Russian Bank"

- Alternative names: Polish Bank, Russian Bank
- Type: Gambling
- Players: 4-7
- Cards: 52 cards
- Deck: Anglo-American
- Play: Clockwise
- Chance: Medium

Bank, also known as Polish Bank or Russian Bank, is a comparing card game. The game requires a standard 52-card deck and five or six players.

== Rules ==
At the start of the game, each player contributes an arranged stake to the pool. The dealer gives three cards to each player and turns up another; if this is not lower than an eight (ace is lowest), the dealer continues turning up cards until such a card is exposed. The player on the dealer's left, without touching or looking at the three cards received, can bet the amount of the pool, or any part of it, that among those cards is one that is higher (of the same suit) than the turn-up. If the player wins, the player takes the amount from the pool; if the player loses, the player pays that amount to the pool. Each player does the same in turn, the dealer last. Whenever the pool is exhausted, a fresh stake is put into the pool. After a round is over the deal passes. No player may touch any cards received until making a bet; the penalty is a fine to the pool of twice the stake, and the loss of the right to bet during that round.
