= Coulterville, California =

Coulterville
- Census-designated place
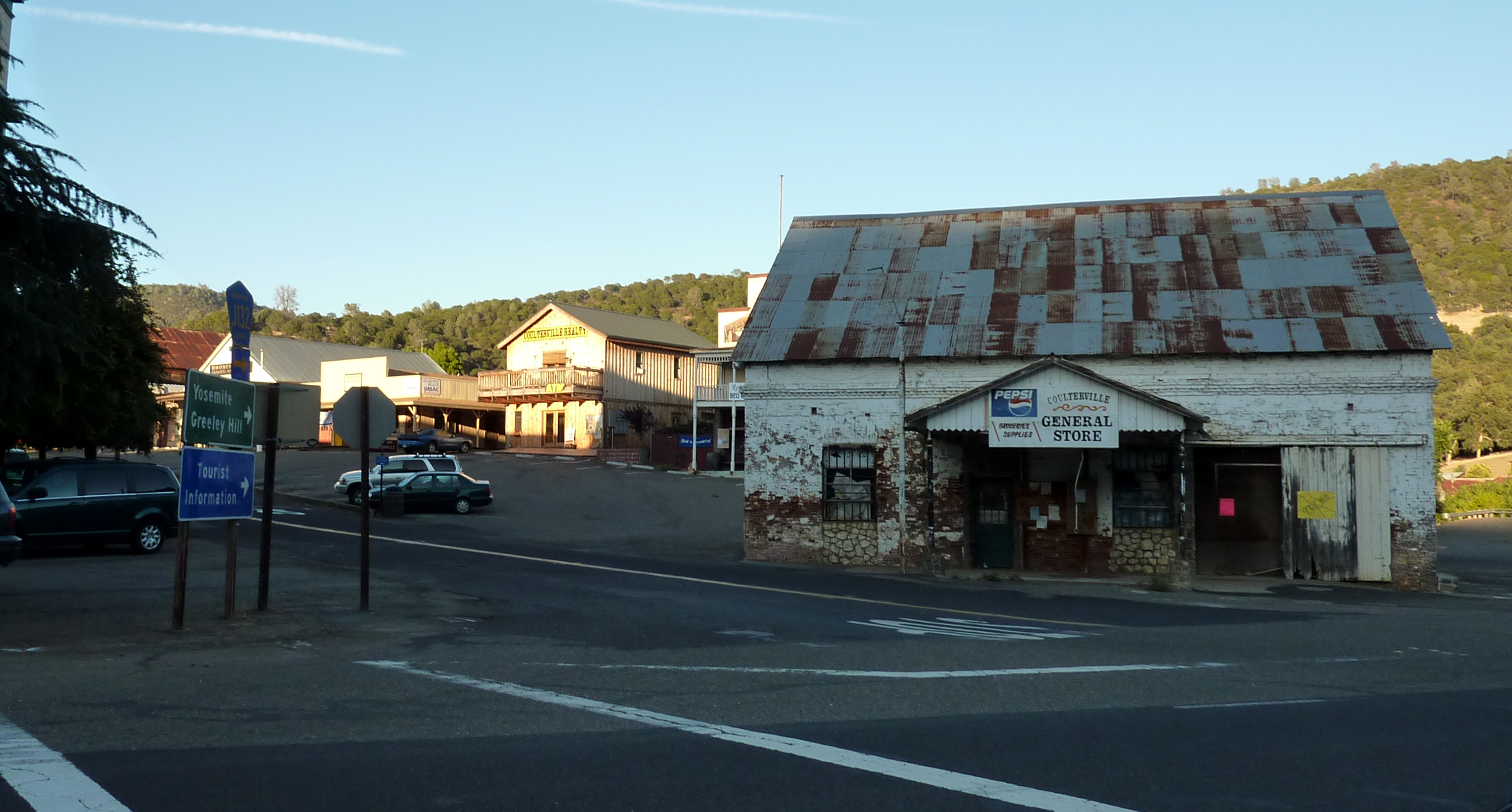
- Coulterville Main Street Historic District

- Location within California Location within the United States
- Coordinates: 37°42′38″N 120°11′53″W
- Country: United States
- State: California
- County: Mariposa County

Area
  - Total: 0.39 sq mi (1.01 km^{2})
  - Land: 0.39 sq mi (1.01 km^{2})
  - Water: 0 sq mi (0.00 km^{2}) 0.02%
- Elevation: 1,696 ft (517 m)

Population (2020)
  - Total: 115
  - Density: 295.6/sq mi (114.15/km^{2})
- Time zone: UTC-8 (Pacific (PST))
  - Summer (DST): UTC-7 (PDT)
- ZIP Code: 95311
- Area code: 209
- FIPS code: 06-16644
- GNIS feature ID: 2582984

California Historical Landmark
- Reference no.: 332

Coulterville (formerly Maxwell's Creek) is a census-designated place in Mariposa County, California, United States. It is located on Maxwell Creek 20 miles (32 km) northwest of Mariposa, at an elevation of 1,699 feet (518 m). Coulterville had a population of 115 at the 2020 census, down from 201 at the 2010 census, when the CDP covered a much greater area. It is a mining town located in the foothills of the Sierra Nevada. The ZIP Code is 95311. The community is in area code 209.

== History ==
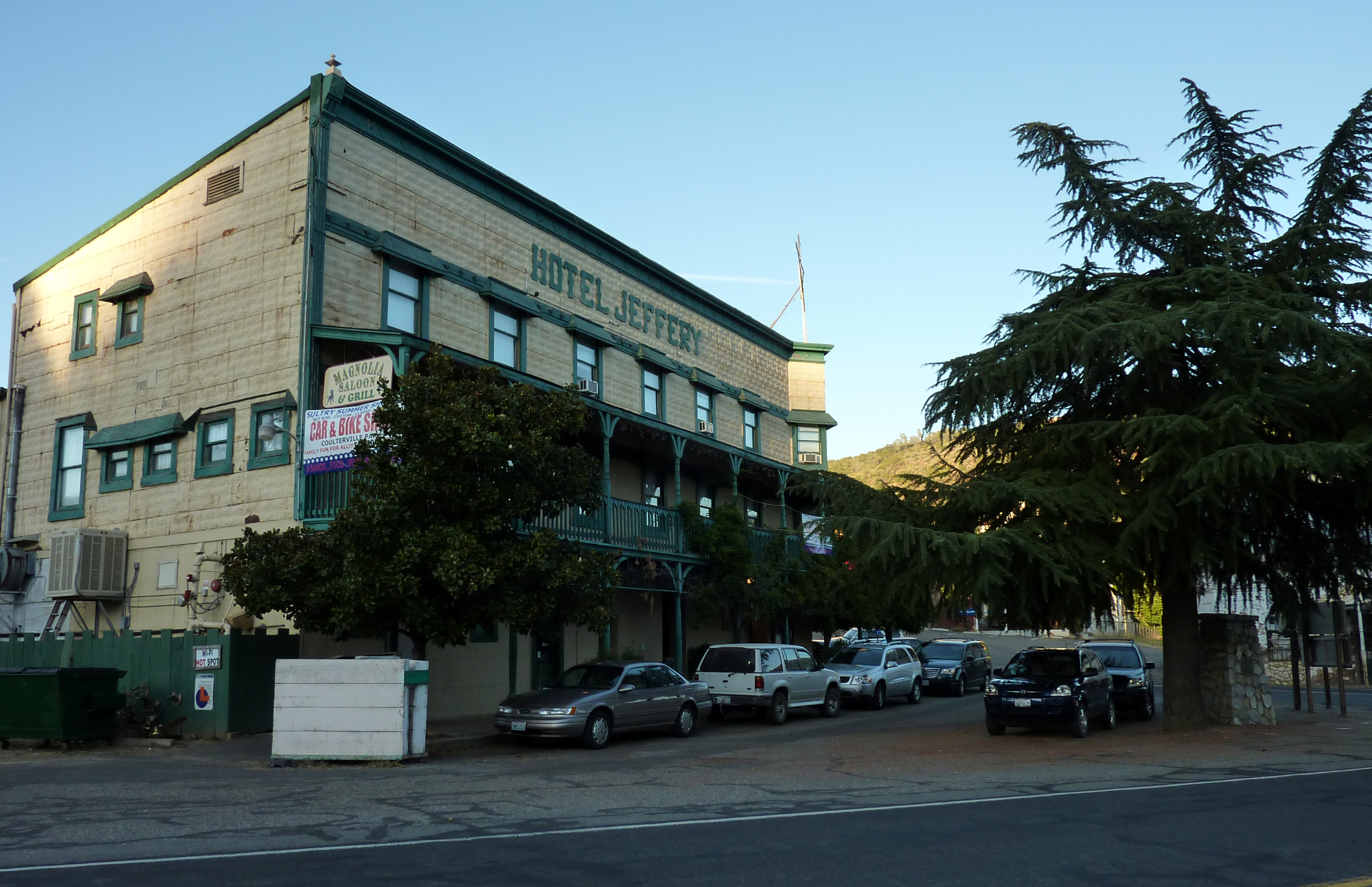
The Hotel Jeffery, established 1851, is part of the historic district.

The place was settled in 1850 by George W. Coulter, for whom it is also named. For a time Coulter lived in a tent flying the American flag, prompting local Mexicans to call the place Banderita (Spanish for "small flag"). The Maxwell's Creek post office opened in 1852 and changed its name to Coulterville in 1853. The name "Maxwell" honors George Maxwell, with whom Coulter cast lots to determine the name of the town.

Coulterville is registered as California Historical Landmark #332. A large portion of the downtown was listed on the National Register of Historic Places as the Coulterville Main Street Historic District.

The 1867 Brevet General James F. Rusling inspection report notes that most of the Stockton to Coulterville area was "in almost continuous wheat-fields" May 24–26, 1866.

== Geography ==
According to the United States Census Bureau, the CDP covers an area of 0.39 square miles (1.0 km^{2}), all land, a decline from 4.2 square miles (11 km^{2}) in 2010.

== Demographics ==
Historical population
Census	Pop.	Note	%±
2010	201		—
2020	115		−42.8%
U.S. Decennial Census; 1850–1870 1880-1890; 1900 1910 1920; 1930 1940 1950; 1960 1970 1980; 1990 2000 2010

Coulterville first appeared as a census designated place in the 2010 U.S. census.

=== 2020 census ===
As of the 2020 census, Coulterville had a population of 115. The median age was 48.3 years, with 38.3% of the population aged 45 to 64. 15.7% of residents were under the age of 18 and 21.7% of residents were 65 years of age or older. There were 53 males and 62 females; for every 100 females there were 85.5 males, and for every 100 females age 18 and over there were 73.2 males age 18 and over.

0.0% of residents lived in urban areas, while 100.0% lived in rural areas.

There were 54 households in Coulterville, of which 33.3% had children under the age of 18 living in them. Of all households, 50.0% were married-couple households, 14.8% were households with a male householder and no spouse or partner present, and 29.6% were households with a female householder and no spouse or partner present. About 24.1% of all households were made up of individuals and 13.0% had someone living alone who was 65 years of age or older. The average household size was 2.13. The community had 36 families (66.7% of all households).

There were 69 housing units, of which 21.7% were vacant, with 54 (78.3%) occupied. Of the occupied units, 29 (53.7%) were owner-occupied and 25 (46.3%) were renter-occupied. The homeowner vacancy rate was 12.1% and the rental vacancy rate was 0.0%.

Racial composition as of the 2020 census
Race	Number	Percent
White	92	80.0%
Black or African American	0	0.0%
American Indian and Alaska Native	1	0.9%
Asian	1	0.9%
Native Hawaiian and Other Pacific Islander	0	0.0%
Some other race	11	9.6%
Two or more races	10	8.7%
Hispanic or Latino (of any race)	13	11.3%

== Government ==
In the California State Legislature, Coulterville is in the 4th senatorial district, represented by Republican Marie Alvarado-Gil, and in the 8th Assembly district, represented by Republican David Tangipa.

In the United States House of Representatives, Coulterville is in California's 5th congressional district, represented by Republican Tom McClintock.

Coulterville, along with its neighboring communities of Greeley Hill and Lake Don Pedro (Mariposa Cnty. portion) comprise County Supervisorial District 3 of the county of Mariposa.
