= Ahwahnechee =

Native American tribe in Yosemite Valley, California, U.S.

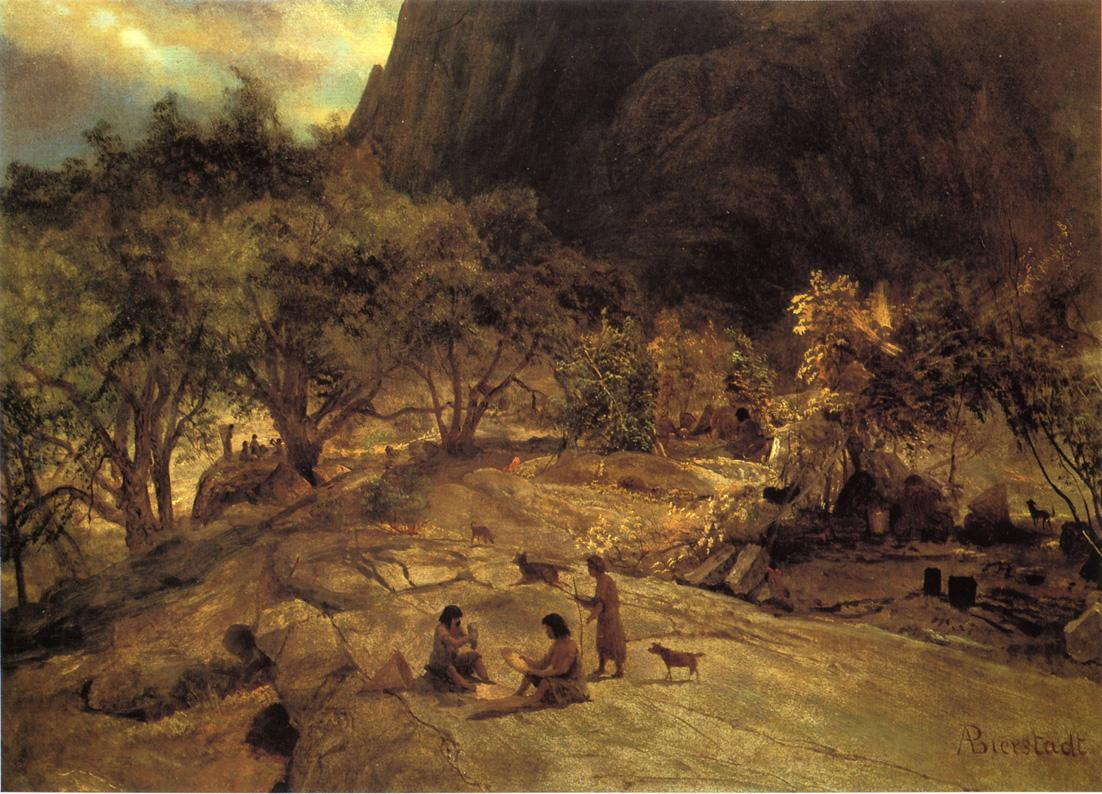
- Painting of a "Mariposa Indian Encampment, Yosemite Valley, California" by Albert Bierstadt, ca. 1872

Total population
- unknown (1911)

Regions with significant populations
- Yosemite Valley, California

Languages
- Mono, Southern Sierra Miwok

Related ethnic groups
- other Plains and Sierra Miwok and Mono people

The Ahwahnechee, Awani, or Awalache were an Indigenous people of California who historically lived in the Yosemite Valley. They were a band of Mono and Miwok People.

The Awani people's heritage can be found all over Yosemite National Park. This heritage is being actively erased by the Trump administration.

== Name ==
The name Awani was also the name of their primary village. The anglicizations of their name from the 19th century have included Ahwahnechee (by Hittell in 1868), Awalache (by Johnston in 1851), Awallache (by McKee in 1851), and Awanee (by Powers in 1874).

== Language ==
They spoke Mono and Southern Sierra Miwok. These names are unlikely to be what they called their native tongues. See the Southern Sierra Miwok tribe website for details on language revitalization

== History ==
The Awani lived in Yosemite Valley for centuries. It is believed that they may have lived in the area for as long as 7,000 years. They were primarily Mono, and bordered on the north, south and west by various Miwok tribes. They routinely traded with the Paiute tribe across the mountains to the east.

=== Initial contacts ===
European-American contact began after 1833. In 1850 a settler named James D. Savage set up a mining camp down below the valley, and spent most of his time mining for gold and trading with the few other white men in the area. He took several Indian wives and developed political relations within tribes of Yokut. He led their people into battle against other local tribes. He was accused by Chowchilla tribal chieftain Jose Juarez to have been unfairly gambling away barrels of gold dust and money that were supposed to be relied on to procure supplies. Savage then punched Jose in the nose thereby losing his support and friendship. Savage moved onto Ahwahnechee land and effectively disrupted the lives of every Ahwahnechee. Later that year, Savage's camp and post were attacked in retaliation by the Ahwahnechee. The Ahwahnechee raided his supplies, and killed two of his men. This, in turn, sparked the Mariposa Indian War of 1850 to 1851, one of many wars that made up the Indigenous genocide supported by the state of California. In 1851, during the Mariposa War, California State Militia troops of the Mariposa Battalion burned Ahwahnechee villages and took their food stores.

The state militia with Savage as their major and the Indian Commissioners from Washington were called out to either convince or force the Native people to sign treaties. Six tribes made agreements with the government to accept reservation land further down into the foothills. One of the tribes that refused to meet was the Ahwahnechees. When the soldiers, led by Savage, moved towards their camp to force them out, their chief, Teneiya (also called as, Tenaya), finally appeared alone and attempted to conceal the location and number of his people. Major Savage told Teneiya that he would travel to the valley to find his people. Chief Teneiya said that he would go back and return with his tribe. When the chief appeared again Savage noticed that there were very few of the Native people present. He asked the chief where the rest of his people were, and Teneiya denied having any more people than were there at the moment. Savage was convinced that if he found the rest of the tribe he could persuade them to come with him back to the negotiations. The Major took some men with him to the north through the mountains and came upon the valley. This was the first entry into Yosemite Valley by any white men. Camping that night, the men debated what to call the valley they had just discovered. They agreed upon the name that the white men had already called the tribe, Yosemite. The date was March 25, 1851. Once they reached the village of Teneiya's people, a search was made, but no more Indians were found there or in the valley at all. The soldiers returned to the meeting place, but Chief Teneiya and the part of the tribe that was already in their custody escaped and returned to the mountains.

That May, a second expedition of militia traveled north to capture the old chief and his band once and for all. Only a few warriors, among them two of Chief Teneiya's sons, were found. The chief was eventually brought in to find that his sons had been shot for trying to escape. Within a few days, the chief also tried to escape by jumping into the river.

With the recapture of Chief Teneiya the rest of the band was easily found and brought to the Fresno reservation in the foothills where they stayed long enough to regain their strength and petitioned for their freedom to return to their mountain home. This was granted and they returned to their secluded valley of "Ahwahnee".

In 1852, a Mariposa expedition of US federal troops heard a report that Ahwahnechee Indians killed two European-American miners at Bridalveil Meadows. Soldiers were again dispatched and the troops executed five Ahwahnechee men. Later, the tribe fled over the mountains to shelter with a neighboring people, the Mono tribe. They stayed the year and then returned to their native valley taking with them horses stolen from the hospitable Monos who soon followed seeking revenge, killing Chief Teneiya and all but eight of the young braves and taking all the women and children captive.

=== Later history ===
Chief Teneiya (d. 1853) was a leader in Yosemite Valley. His father was Ahwahnechee. He led his band away from Yosemite to settle with Paiutes in eastern California. Tenaya has descendants living today.

The U.S. federal government evicted Yosemite Native people from the park in 1851, 1906, 1929, and 1969.

In 1969, Yosemite staff razed the village in a fire fighting drill after the majority of what was left of the Indigenous Ahwahnechee tribe stopped working for the park as Indian performers. The use of the word Indian in this context refers to the white settler conception of Indigeneity used to authenticate a "wilderness" experience. The removal of Indigenous peoples like the Ahwahnechee was necessary to sell the image of "untrammeled wilderness" that is spelled out in acts which federally designate areas as protected land from resource extraction. The Ahwahnee hotel gift shop sells artwork using Indigenous patterns after the removal of Indigenous people who helped bring legitimacy to the park as a wilderness, which line pockets of Aramark shareholders rather than the people who tended the garden we now call wilderness. As Donald Trump's administration shows, these protections are nominal and likely to be reversed when resource extraction and/or short term profits are deemed higher priorities.

Jay Johnson of the Mariposa Indian Council identifies as an Ahwahnechee descendent.

Today, the Southern Sierra Miwuk Nation continues to act as stewards of the land, helping to restore degraded land in Mariposa County. These sovereign nations are oftentimes treated as vassals of the federal government, yet they have mission statements, health plans for their members and strong communities which still have to fight for federal recognition after their lands were stolen and people were murdered in the genocide of Indigenous people which occurred after California became a state.

== Plant use ==
The Ahwahneechee burned undergrowth in the Valley to protect the oak trees. Acorns were a central staple of their diet, Black oak acorns providing almost 60% of it. The acorns were laid on a slab of rock in the sun to dry. Then they were ground up in small holes atop big granite slabs known as grinding rocks, like a mortar and pestle. Once they had been sufficiently ground down to a fine powder, the acorn flour was put into a shallow depression at the edge of the river. This depression was lined with leaves to keep the acorn powder from being lost in the sand. The flour was then rinsed to remove toxins, making it palatable. Once rinsed and edible, the flour was placed into willow cooking baskets with fresh water. Rocks were heated in a fire and placed in the basket to cook the mixture, which was then consumed either as a mush or baked into a flatbread.

National Park Service naturalist, Will Neely created a list of the plants commonly used by the Ahwahnechee. Black oak, sugar pine, western juniper, canyon live oak, interior live oak, foothill pine, buckeye, pinyon pine nuts provided acorns and seeds for food. Other plants provided smaller seeds. Mariposa tulip, golden brodiaea, common camas, squaw root, and Bolander's yampah provided edible bulbs and roots. Greens eaten by the Ahwahnechee included broad-leaved lupine, common monkey flower, nude buckwheat, California thistle, miner's lettuce, sorrel, clover, umbrella plant, crimson columbine, and alum root. Strawberry, blackberry, raspberry, thimbleberry, wild grape, gooseberry, currant, blue elderberry, western choke cherry, Sierra plum, and greenleaf manzanita provided berries and fruits.

The Ahwahnechee brewed drinks from whiteleaf manzanita and western juniper. Commonly used medicine plants included Yerba santa, yarrow, giant hyssop, Brewer's angelica, sagebrush, showy milkweed, mountain dogbane, balsamroot, California barberry, fleabane, mint, knotweed, the California wildrose, meadow goldenrod, mule ears, pearly everlasting, and the California laurel.

The tribe used soap plant and meadow rue to make soap. They used fibers from Mountain dogbane, showy milkweed, wild grape, and soap plant for cordage.

Baskets were woven from splints of American dogwood, big-leaf maple, buckbrush, deer brush, willow, and California hazelnut Additional bracken fern would add black colors to the basket and redbud would provide red.

The tribe made bows from incense-cedar, and Pacific dogwood. They built homes from Incense-cedar.

== Architecture ==
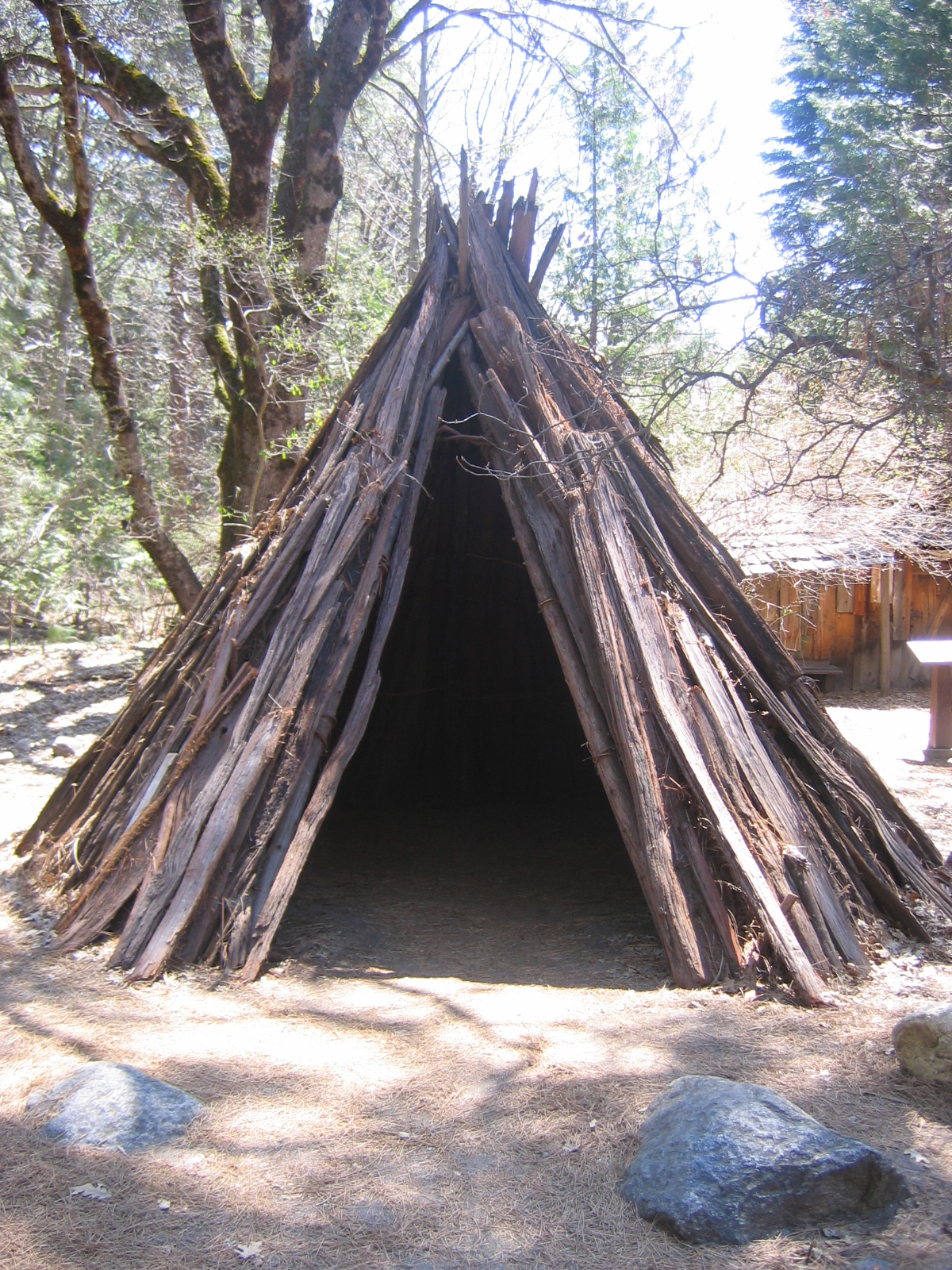
Replica of a cedar bark umuucha in Yosemite Valley

The Awani people historically camped at the bottom of the valley, in small houses known as o-chum. These small homes were built with pine for the framing and supports, using the wood in a tipi-like structure with a diameter of about 12 feet. To insulate their homes, they covered pine poles with cedar bark to create a sturdy and durable shelter. An o-chum had two openings: an entrance at front and smokehole at its pinnacle.

A small fire was built in the colder months for warmth. A family of about six could live in an o-chum. Pelts of small animals made bedding. Hides of bear or deer were used as mattresses. The blanket was - like the bedding - made from the skins of the smaller animals, cut into strips, and woven together for extra warmth.

Another sort of building that the Awani often used was a sweat house. These structures were somewhat similar to the o-chum, only with a rounded roof, as opposed to a pointed roof, and covered with mud. Young hunters used sweat houses before they went on a trip, to rid their bodies of the human smell that could betray their presence to the prey. Sweats also provided the men with a way to relax and cleanse themselves for religious and health purposes.

== Traditional Land Management ==
The Awani historically managed populations of a range of animals, particularly mule deer, black bear, trout and grouse.

== Ahwahnechee place names ==
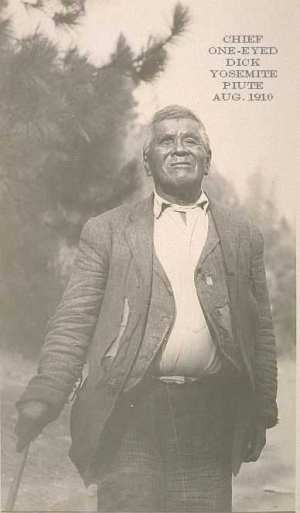
Chief George Dick, a Yosemite Paiute

Some Ahwahnechee tribal names for areas around Yosemite Valley include the following:

- Ahwahne: Yosemite Valley
- Tesa'ak (Teh-sa-ahk'): Half Dome (South Dome) - name of a Mono woman for whom Half Dome was named. Half Dome resembled a Mono woman's head and shoulder because they traditionally bobbed their hair and had bangs. The dark vertical dripping stripes of lichens resembled tear stains, and her tears were said to form Mirror Lake.
- Loya: Sentinel Rock
- Tutocanula or Tool-tock Awn-oo-lah: El Capitan
- Ahwayee: Mirror Lake
- Patillima or Ernating Lawootoo: Glacier Point
- Pohono: Bridalveil Fall
- Piwyack: Tenaya Lake
- Yonapah: Vernal Fall
- Yowihe: Nevada Fall
- Chookoneh: Royal Arches (Yosemite)
- Tokoyee: North Dome
- Wakalmata: Merced River
- Tahachee: Indian Canyon
- Yayan: Cascade Falls
- Yawachkee: Yosemite Museum - name of village where museum is currently located
- Mahtah: Liberty Cap

=== Villages ===
Nine Ahwahnechee villages in Yosemite Valley housed 450 Indigenous residents when Euro-American settlers first arrived. These villages were Awani, Hokokwito, Kumaini, Lesamaiti, Macheto, Notomidula, Sakaya, and Wahak. The principal village, and by extension the whole Yosemite Valley, was Awani.

== Namesakes ==
The Ahwahnee Hotel and Ahwahneechee Village, a recreated 19th-century tribal village in Yosemite Valley, are both named for the tribe, as are the Ahwahnee Heritage Days, Ahwahnee, California, and Ahwahnee Estates, California.

== Descendants ==
Contemporary groups connected to the Ahwahneechee include the American Indian Council of Mariposa County, Inc. (or Southern Sierra Miwuk Nation), the Mono Lake Kootzaduka'a, and the following federally recognized tribes:

- Bishop Paiute Tribe
- Bridgeport Indian Colony
- Northfork Rancheria of Mono Indians of California
- Picayune Rancheria of Chukchansi Indians
- Tuolumne Band of Me-Wuk Indians.

An unrecognized tribe, the Southern Sierra Miwuk Nation is actively petitioning the U.S. Department of the Interior for federal recognition. The Bureau of Indian Affairs submitted a preliminary finding against federal recognition for the group in 2018. The Mono Lake Kootzaduka'a Tribe are also unrecognized.
