= Jim Savage =

American explorer (1823-1852)

- Born: 1823; Jacksonville, Illinois, US
- Died: 1852 (aged 28–29); Fresno County, California, US
- Occupations: Businessman, soldier and commander

James D. Savage (1823–1852) was a California pioneer. He was a 49er, businessman, American soldier in the Mexican–American War, and commander of the California Militia, Mariposa Battalion in the Mariposa War and the first alleged non-Native American visitor to the Yosemite Valley.

== Early life ==
James D. Savage was born in Jacksonville, Illinois in 1823, soon after moving to Jacksonville of Morgan County, Illinois, to Peter Savage and Doritha Shaunce (née) and was named after his paternal grandfather. In the fall of 1833, Savage's mother died of unknown causes. In 1836, Savage's father relocated the family to Princeton, Illinois and remarried. Savage was thirteen at the time.

Receiving little in the way of formal education, Savage quickly took to the outdoors, where he honed his gift for languages with local Fox and Sac Native Americans—a skill which would prove critical in his later dealings. Little is known of his life during this period. In 1840s, Savage moved to Cayuga County, New York, where he married Eliza Hall in 1845. Following the marriage, Savage and his wife then relocated to Peru, Illinois. Their life together in Illinois, however, was short-lived. Drawn by the allure of gold, Savage, Eliza, and Savage's brother, Morgan, migrated west towards California in April 1846 with the intention of striking a fortune in the precious metal. Upon their arrival at Independence, Missouri, Savage and his family joined a wagon train party led by former Missouri Governor Lilburn Boggs for the trip to California. As the Boggs party headed west, they would later be accompanied by other parties, including the famed Donner Party. During the six-month journey west, Eliza gave birth to a baby girl. Unfortunately, both mother and child died shortly after in 1846. In a 1908 letter to the editor of the San Francisco Chronicle, Lilburn Bogg's son, William M. Boggs, recounted Eliza's death. Weakened due to childbirth, Eliza succumbed to exposure to the cold and was interred in a shallow grave somewhere in the region of Lake Tahoe. With Eliza gone, the baby girl perished soon after. The child was never given a name.

== Year of birth ==
Although most contemporary sources cite Savage's year of birth to be 1817, Tulare County Library Historian Annie R. Mitchell identified Savage as being born in 1823 in her 1949 article, “Major James D. Savage and the Tularenos,” published in the journal, California Historical Society Quarterly. In the article's notes, Mitchell stated that she derived Savage's genealogical information from the letters of H.M. Savage as well as from the 1881 book, Reminiscences of a Ranger by Horace Bell.

== California ==
=== Mexican-American War ===
Boggs' party arrived at Sutter's Fort in California on October 28, 1846. While there, Savage volunteered to join John Fremont's California Battalion during the California Campaign of the Mexican–American War. Savage had arrived too late to take part in the Bear Flag Rebellion, but he did participate in the Battalion's march from Monterey to San Luis Obispo which took place between November 17 and December 14, 1846. Although he was described as one of “the worst malcontents in the battalion,” Savage remained under Fremont's command until the unit was disbanded in April 1847. It was during Savage's time in the battalion where he learned from his Indian compatriots of a region in California's central valley the Spanish called Tulares — later known as the San Joaquin Valley. Following the dissolution of Fremont's battalion, Savage eventually traveled to the San Joaquin Valley, where he established a number of trading posts along the Merced, Fresno, and Mariposa Rivers, living among the local Indian tribe, the Yokuts.

=== Relationship With California Native Americans During the Gold Rush Years ===
During his time with the Yokuts, Savage eventually learned their language and, for the purposes of building political alliances, married several daughters of the tribal leaders of the tribes in the Sierra foothill region. Using his status, Savage led the Yokuts in battle against other tribes as one of their chieftains. In addition to the Yokuts, Savage also established amicable relations with the nearby Chowchilla tribe, befriending their chief, Jose-Juarez. Due to his significant standing within the Native American community of California's Central Valley and the surrounding Sierras, the Indians trusted Savage to broker the trade of gold and goods on their behalf. In doing so, Savage's influence and ability to intermingle with both Native Americans and whites elevated him to serve as the leader for many California Indian tribes. Assuming the name given to him by the local Indians, "El Rey Güero," or, "The Blond King," Savage certainly lived up to his namesake. He preferred to be addressed by his honorific and commanded Natives under his control to mine for gold.

Savage's relationship with California Indians, however, was not enduring. On an 1850 trip to San Francisco, Savage, accompanied by Jose-Juarez and a number of female Indians, arrived in the city to trade and purchase goods and supplies for the local Indian tribes. In addition to purchasing supplies, Savage also sought a safe place to cache the 160 pounds of gold dust he brought with him - even rolling the barrel of gold through the lobby of the hotel in which they were staying. Delighted by the city's metropolitan atmosphere and the influx of business and new excitements brought about by California's 1848 Gold Rush, Savage and Jose-Juarez took to the streets, visiting gambling dens and drinking heavily throughout the course of their stay. In doing so, Savage ultimately ended up gambling away his gold, in addition to money designated for the purchase of supplies. Witnessing this, Jose-Juarez confronted Savage about his imprudent decision-making. As he later told Lafayette Bunnell, Savage was appalled that a Native would have the audacity to deride a white man in public and struck Jose-Juarez. Although nothing more was said about the incident during the trip, Juarez's faith in Savage as a friend to the Indians had been shaken.

Following the group's return to Fresno River from San Francisco, reports of Indian raiding parties throughout the Central Valley began to materialize. Hoping to drive whites out of the region, the Indians had begun a campaign of random attacks on white settlements and trading posts in the area. Upon learning this, Savage appealed to Indians who were gathered nearby to dissuade them from taking up arms against the whites, stating that they lacked the ability to counter the white man's technological and numerical superiority. Requesting Jose-Juarez for support on the matter, Juarez stood up before the Indians who were present. Instead of backing Savage, however, Juarez condemned Savage as a charlatan who was only exploiting his relationships with the Indian tribes and playing them against white settlers for his own personal gain. Jose-Juarez (via Jill Cossley-Batt's Last of the California Rangers):

What I have to say will come from my heart, and I will speak with a straight tongue, for the Great Spirit is looking at me and will hear me. Savage, indeed, has told you many interesting things, but he didn’t tell you how he gambled away our gold, and how he struck and knocked me down. I tell you he is no friend of the Indians; he has a forked tongue; he is telling lies to his Indian brethren. He is not our brother. He is ready to help white gold-diggers to drive the Indians from their country. We can drive them from us, and we will, with rocks and bows and arrows. Good words do not last long unless they amount to something. They do not pay for insults and dead people. They do not protect my father’s grave. They do not pay for our country, now over-run with white people, and they do not pay for horses and cattle. Good words will not give me back my children, they will not give my people good health and stop them from dying. It makes my heart sick to think of all the good words and broken promises. There has been too much talking by white men who had no right to talk. All men were made by the same Great Spirit Chief, and if the white men want to live in peace with the Indians, they can live in peace. There need be no troubles. Treat all men alike. Give all an even chance to live and grow. All men are brothers and the earth is the mother of them all. When I think of our condition my heart is heavy—but we must fight to protect ourselves. José Juarez has spoken for his people."

Lafayette Bunnell also provided a similar quote by Jose-Juarez recounted from his personal interactions with Savage during their service together in the Mariposa Battalion:

He is telling you words that are not true. His tongue is forked and crooked. He is telling lies to his Indian relatives. This trader is not a friend to the Indians. He is not our brother. He will help the white gold-diggers to drive the Indians from their country. We can now drive them from among us, and if the other white tribes should come to their help, we will go to the mountains; if they follow after us, they cannot find us; none of them will come back; we will kill them with arrows and with rocks.

The incident in San Francisco greatly damaged Savage's relations among the local tribes. Gradually, the relationships that had propelled Savage to power among the Natives began to dissolve. By the winter of 1850, little chance of reconciliation remained.

=== Attack on Savage's Fresno River Trading Post ===
The California Gold Rush proved to be a highly disruptive development on the California landscape and, despite the stipulation of the Treaty of Guadalupe Hidalgo in 1848 that Indians would be allowed to keep their lands, treaties were neither respected nor regarded by the influx of white profiteers. As Indians began attacking settlements throughout the Central Valley, it became clear to Savage that these hostilities were not isolated but, rather, indicative of a larger general uprising among the Native American population.

On the night of December 17, 1850, while at his camp in Mariposa, Savage noticed many of the Indians under his employ had vanished and fled. Understanding that the Indians' disappearance was a portent of something more serious, Savage mobilized a small force of 16 men to pursue the Indians before they could coalesce with any larger group of Indians that were potentially waiting nearby. Upon encountering a group of Kaweah Indians on a distant hilltop, Savage demanded to speak with their leader. The Kaweah chief, who had once been friendly with Savage, informed him that they had only recently returned from an attack on Savage's Fresno River trading post and had killed the clerks and plundered the supplies. Savage pleaded with them to cease their attacks but it was to no avail. The Indians allowed Savage and his men to leave then joined up with an even larger attack force of 200 Native Americans hiding in the surrounding foothills.

By the time Savage and his group returned to Mariposa, official word of the attack at the Fresno River trading post confirmed the Indians' information. Savage bolstered the numbers of his group to thirty five men and immediately set out to investigate. Upon arrival at the trading post, Savage was greeted with a scene of carnage. In a letter to California Governor Peter Burnett from Indian Agent Adam Johnston, who had accompanied Savage, Johnston described the horrific scene laid out in front of them.

We reached the camp on the Fresno [River] a short time after daylight. It presented a horrid scene of savage cruelty. The Indians had destroyed everything they could not use or carry. The store was stripped of blankets, clothing, flour and everything of value; the safe was broken open and rifled of its contents; the cattle, horses and mules had been run into the mountains; the murdered men had been stripped of their clothing, and lay before us filled with arrows; one of them had yet twenty perfect arrows sticking in him. A grave was prepared, and the unfortunate persons interred. Our force being small, we thought it not prudent to pursue the Indians further into the mountains, and determined to return. The Indians in that part of the country are quite numerous, and have been uniting other tribes with them for some time.

=== Mariposa War and Discovery of Yosemite Valley ===
When local militia failed to quell the uprising of the tribes, the governor of California, John McDougall, put Savage at the head of a unit of State Militia called the Mariposa Battalion with the rank of Major. Savage was not selected for his military experience but, rather, for his familiarity with the "habits, customs, haunts, and language of the Indians, as well as of the country they would have to traverse." As the fighting intensified, a Sierra Indian tribe, known as the Ahwahnechee, led by their Chief, Tenaya, had been assumed responsible for a number of raids on white settlements. Ordered to surrender, Tenaya led Savage and his men to believe that the Awahnachee were giving themselves to surrender. Instead, however, the group fled deeper into the Sierras in the hopes of escape. On March 25, 1851, Savage marched at the head of a company of the Mariposa Battalion which included a Doctor Lafayette Bunnell, who later wrote about the expedition in Hutching's California Magazine in 1859.

In pursuit of the outlaw Awahnechee people, Savage's battalion came upon a U-shaped glacial valley, inadvertently becoming the first alleged non-indigenous discoverers of Yosemite Valley. In his recollection of the valley's discovery, Bunnell wrote about his experience of laying eyes upon Yosemite Valley for the first time:

It has been said that “it is not easy to describe in words the precise impressions which great objects make upon us.” I cannot describe how completely I realized this truth. None but those who have visited this most wonderful valley, can even imagine the feelings with which I looked upon the view that was there presented. The grandeur of the scene was but softened by the haze that hung over the valley,—light as gossamer—and by the clouds which partially dimmed the higher cliffs and mountains. This obscurity of vision but increased the awe with which I beheld it, and as I looked, a peculiar exalted sensation seemed to fill my whole being, and I found my eyes in tears with emotion.

Yosemite Valley and Half Dome

After camping the night at the foot of Bridalveil Fall, Bunnell credits himself for naming the valley after the Miwok word yosemite, which meant "those who kill." After campaigns up the rivers into the mountains and taking control of the Yosemite, the Awahnechee submitted to moving to a reservation, resulting in the end of the Mariposa War, and the disbandment of the Mariposa Battalion.

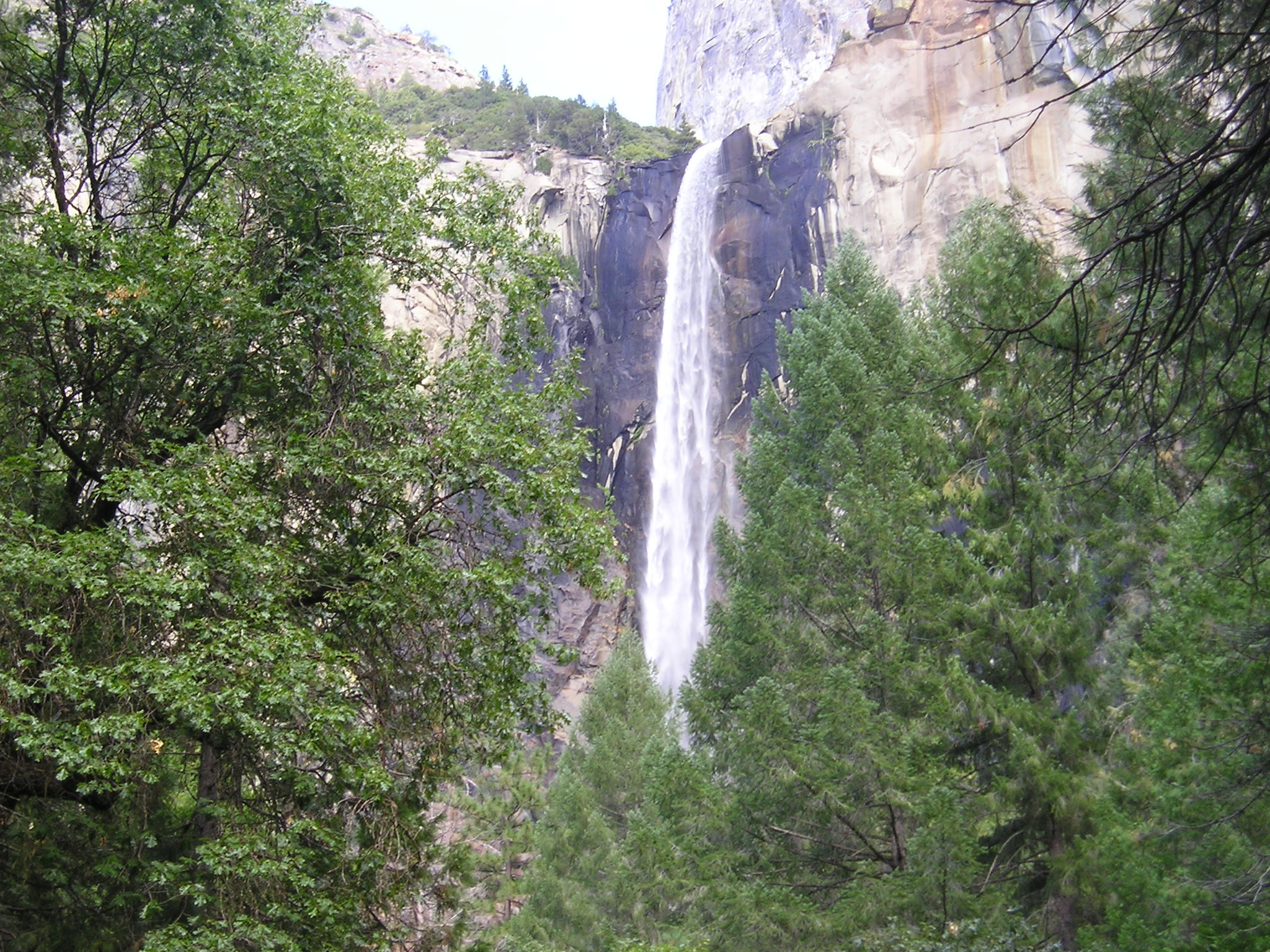
Bridalveil Fall, Yosemite, CA

== Discrepancies as "Discoverer" of Yosemite ==
There is a possibility that non-indigenous explorers may have visited Yosemite Valley earlier, predating Savage's expedition into the valley by at least two years. These accounts are unconfirmed but are worth mentioning for the sake of further inquiry.

In his travel diary, dated October 18, 1849, millwright William Penn Abrams described a glacial Sierra valley which could be representative of Yosemite Valley. Abrams writes:

Returned to S. F. after visit to Savage property on Merced River, prospects none too good for a mill. Savage is a blasphemous fellow who has five squaws for wives for which he takes his authority from the Scriptures. While at Savage’s Reamer and I saw a grizzly bear tracks and went out to hunt him down getting lost in the mountains and not returning until the following evening, found our way to camp over an Indian trail that led past a valley enclosed by stupendous cliffs rising perhaps 3000 feet from their base and which gave us cause for wonder. Not far off a waterfall dropped from a cliff below three jagged peaks into the valley while farther beyond a rounded mountain stood, the valley wide of which looked as though it had been sliced with a knife as one would slice a loaf of bread and which Reamer and I called the Rock of Ages.

A similar description is given by Zenas Leonard in recounting his 1833 travels through the Sierras, although Leonard could have been referring to the Cascades region.

We traveled a few miles every day, still on top of the mountain, and our course continually obstructed with snow hills and rocks. Here we began to encounter in our path many small streams which would shoot out from under these high snow-banks, and after running a short distance in deep chasms which they have through the ages cut in the rocks, precipitate themselves from one lofty precipice to another, until they are exhausted in rain below. Some of these precipices appeared to us to be more than a mile high. Some of the men thought that if we could succeed in descending one of these precipices to the bottom, we might thus work our way into the valley below—but on making several attempts we found it utterly impossible for a man to descend, to say nothing of our horses. We were then obliged to keep along the top of the dividing ridge between two of these chasms which seemed to lead pretty near in the direction we were going—which was west,—in passing over the mountain, supposing it to run north and south.

While the possibility of other non-indigenous travelers to enter Yosemite before Savage exists, the Mariposa expedition into the valley is the most well-documented account.

== Last years ==
Savage returned to his work as a trader, establishing posts at the new reservations. On July 2, 1852, white squatters entered the Kings River Reservation and several natives were massacred by whites led by Walter Harvey. Savage publicly denounced the action to pacify the tribes, and called upon the United States Indian Commissioners to conduct an inquiry. A council was to be held in August. While on his way to the council, Savage met Harvey, and an argument ensued in which Harvey demanded that Savage retract his statements about him. Savage struck Harvey on the chin, and Harvey pulled a pistol and killed Savage with four shots. Harvey was arrested and tried for murder, but was acquitted on the grounds that the shooting was in self-defense. The fact that the judge trying the case had been placed on the bench by Harvey may have been a reason for the acquittal.

Savage was buried four times. He was first buried near Campbell's Ferry on the Kings River in 1852. In 1855, his business partner, Dr. Lewis Leach, moved his remains to the Fresno River trading post and erected a granite monument. His grave was moved again during construction of Hidden Dam in the 1970s, then relocated to nearby Buck Ridge following vandalism at the previous site.

== Legacy ==
Following are a select number of sites in California which remain as historical memorials to Savage's life.

- Savage's gravesite on the shores of Hensley Lake in Madera County, California.
- Historical marker in Reedley, California in Fresno County.
- Savage Trading Post in Mariposa County, California.
- Historical marker near Visalia, California in Tulare County.
- Historical marker near Murphys, California in Calaveras County.

== Portrayal in media ==
The actor Lane Bradford was cast as James Savage in the 1959 episode, "The Blonde King", on the syndicated anthology series, Death Valley Days, hosted by Stanley Andrews. In the story line, Savage has made many friends among Indians in the Yosemite region. When John Trask (Brad Johnson) threatens to disrupt the peace, Savage as commander of the militia must stop him. John Eldredge was cast as California Governor John McDougal, and Robert Brubaker played Major Warren.

== See also ==
- Savage Trading Post
