= Savage Trading Post =

Historical Landmark in El Portal, California, United States

- Location within California Location within the United States
- 37.6541°N 119.887°W
- Location: CA-SR140, El Portal, California

History
- Built: 1849

California Historical Landmark
- Reference no.: 527

Savage Trading Post is California Historical Landmark No. 527 in El Portal, California on California State Route 140 in Mariposa County. James D. Savage was 49er California Gold Rush miner and trader, in 1849 he built a Log cabin. In the Log cabin, he started a general store and trading post along the Merced River. After just one year the Mariposa War started. In the spring of 1850 James (Jim) Savage started trading at Mariposa Creek in the San Joaquin Valley and he had employees run his Trading Post. In December 1850 the war came to Savage Trading Post and it was set on fire. James Savage was the leader of the California Militia's Mariposa Battalion that traveled to the Yosemite Valley in 1851 to hunt down the Ahwaneechees and their leader Chief Tenaya. The Mariposa Battalion won the battle and thus ended the war. The Mariposa Battalion also became the first non-Native American to see the beauty of Yosemite Valley. Lafayette Bunnell wrote about his visit to the Yosemite Valley. A copy of Savage Trading Post was built at the site of the original and is California Historical Landmark No. 527.

== James D. Savage ==
Jim Savage (1823–1852) was also an American soldier in the Mexican–American War. Savage and his family move to California in 1846. Savage wife died shortly after childbirth on the wagan train trip west near Lake Tahoe. In California Savage, sign up and joined California Battalion led by John Fremont. Savage took part in the later part of the Mexican–American War's California Campaign till April 1847. In the California Battalion, he learned some local languages from the Native Army Scouts. With these new language skills, he set up a trading post in the San Joaquin Valley as he lived with local Indian tribes. local Indian tribes called him "El Rey Güero"("The Blond King"). As more California pioneers moved into California, relationships changed. In December 1850 the Trading Post was burnt and his clerks at the post were killed. The governor of California, John McDougall put Savage in charge of the Mariposa Battalion. After the war, Savage returned to trading. Savage was killed in August 1852, by Walter Harvey, who had massacred Indians.

== See also ==
- California Historical Landmarks in Mariposa County
- History of the Yosemite area
- American Indian Wars
