= Bear corn =

Bear corn is a common name for several plants and may refer to:

- Veratrum viride also known as Indian poke, Indian hellebore, false hellebore, green false hellebore
- Conopholis americana also known as cancer-root or squawroot
