= Vega State Park =

State park in Mesa County, Colorado

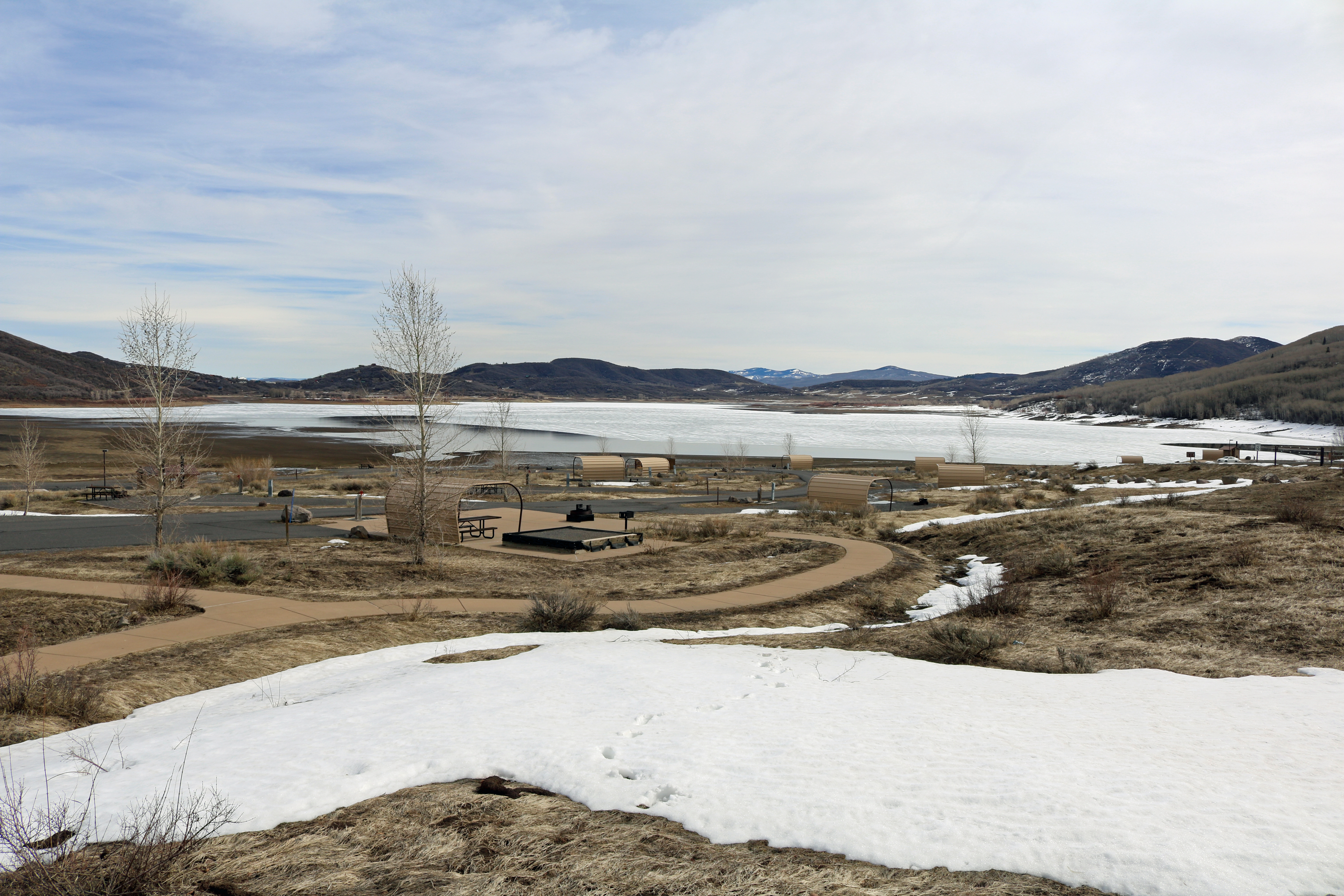
- The reservoir in early spring, still partially frozen.

- Location within Colorado
- Location: Collbran, Mesa County, Colorado, United States
- Coordinates: 39°13′28″N 107°47′36″W
- Area: 1,823 acres (7.38 km^{2})
- Elevation: 7,696 ft (2,346 m)
- Established: 1967
- Visitors: 181,283
- Governing body: Colorado Parks and Wildlife
- Website: Vega State Park

Vega State Park is a 1,823-acre (738 ha) Colorado state park in Mesa County, Colorado in the United States. Vega Reservoir is a fishing destination and is located at an elevation of 7,696 feet (2,346 m). Year-round recreational activities at Vega State Park include boating, hiking, snowmobiling and camping. The park was established in 1967 in cooperation with the Bureau of Reclamation which was responsible for the construction of Vega Dam and Vega Reservoir. It is located at the northeast edge of Grand Mesa National Forest in Western Colorado.

== History ==
The land on which Vega State Park sits was once the swampy shoreline of a vast inland sea during the Paleozoic era. The swamps were filled with sea creatures including giant sea turtles whose fossilized remains can still occasionally be found within the park.

White settlers arrived in the area in 1881 after the Ute tribe Indians had been driven out of the area and onto reservations in eastern Utah. The first Europeans in the area were a pair of Spanish missionaries, Silvestre Vélez de Escalante and Francisco Atanasio Domínguez who were searching for a more direct route to the missions near Monterey, California from the Spanish settlements in Santa Fe, New Mexico. The early Spanish explorers named the area Las Vegas which translates to the Meadows.

The area became commonly known as The Meadows. Most of the area was settled by 1885 by farmers who had acquired their land through the Homestead Act. Twenty-five families lived in the valley raising dairy and beef herds of cattle. The settlement included a school, cemetery, post office and two sawmills. The settlement in the valley did not last long and the area was largely abandoned by 1936 when the school was closed.

The need for water to be used in irrigating the Plateau Valley increased in the 1950s. Vega Dam and Reservoir were constructed beginning in 1957 and completed in 1962. The 925 acres (374 ha) lake is filled by a canal from Park and Leon creeks and by Plateau Creek. Operation of the recreational facilities around Vega Reservoir was transferred to the state of Colorado in 1967 when Vega State Park was formally established.

== Nature ==
Vega State Park is a largely grassy, meadow-like area that surrounds the 925 acres (374 ha) Vega Reservoir. The land at the lake shore is a wetland. The most common mammals found at the park are mule deer, elk, and marmots. Other mammals include cottontail rabbits, ground squirrels, coyote, beaver and chipmunks. The lake is home to several species of trout including rainbow, brook, cutbow and cutthroat. Moose, which have been reintroduced to the area are occasionally spotted at the park, as are bobcats, blue grouse, black bear and wild turkey.

The land that is uphill and away from Vega Reservoir is an aspen forest with mountain shrubland and montane meadow plants. The aspen forest supports aspen, Rocky Mountain maple, Colorado blue spruce, serviceberry, red-osier dogwood and a variety of grasses and forbes. The mountain shrubland community supports Gambel oak, snowberry, chokecherry and serviceberries. The montane meadows were once harvested by farmers for hay and grazed by cattle. The meadows support a diverse variety of native and introduced grasses including mule's ear, tufted hairgrass, lupins, reed canarygrass, water sedge, and timothy-grass.

Vega State Park is on the northeastern edge of Grand Mesa, a broad, flat-topped erosional remnant. Exposed rocks on the mesa from the Cretaceous and Tertiary eras are capped with basaltic lava flows. The lava flows created a Y-shaped outcrop with a tail to the east that suggests that the lava filled an ancient stream bed. The process of erosion carved away the ancient valley walls leaving the lava flows rising above the surrounding terrains.

== Recreation ==
Vega State Park is open for year-round recreation. The visitor center is south of the dam on Vega Reservoir and features displays and exhibits that depict the human and natural history of the area. The visitors center also includes a gift shop. Passes and permits required for admittance to and use of the park facilities can be purchased at the park offices. Vega State Park is home to four campgrounds. Early Settlers Campground has 33 RV sites with electrical and water hook-ups and a bathhouse with toilets and showers. Aspen Grove Campground has 27 RV sites with a centrally located water pump and rustic toilet facilities. Oak Point Campground has 39 RV sites and facilities similar to those of Aspen Grove. Pioneer Campground was 10 tent sites and five rustic cabins with a centrally located water pump and rustic toilet facilities. The cabins are equipped with four bunk beds, sleeping a maximum of six visitors, a kitchen table and chairs, small refrigerator, futon sofa, microwave and propane stove.

Vega State Park is open to hunting and fishing. Vega Reservoir is a productive fishery with numerous species of trout. Hunting is permitted during hunting seasons that are established by the state. Archery and hunting with shotguns are permitted. Vega Reservoir is open to ice fishing during the months when the lake is frozen.

The lake is open to water sports including water skiing, wind surfing, sailing and jet-skiing. There is no swimming area at the lake. Other recreational opportunities at Vega State Park include mountain biking, cross-country skiing, bird watching, picnicking and environmental education.
