= Plateau Creek =

Plateau Creek may refer to

- Plateau Creek (Colorado), a tributary of the Colorado River in the United States
- Plateau Creek (Wyoming), a stream in the Columbia River Watershed in the United States
