= Tenaya Peak =

Mountain in the Yosemite above Tenaya Lake

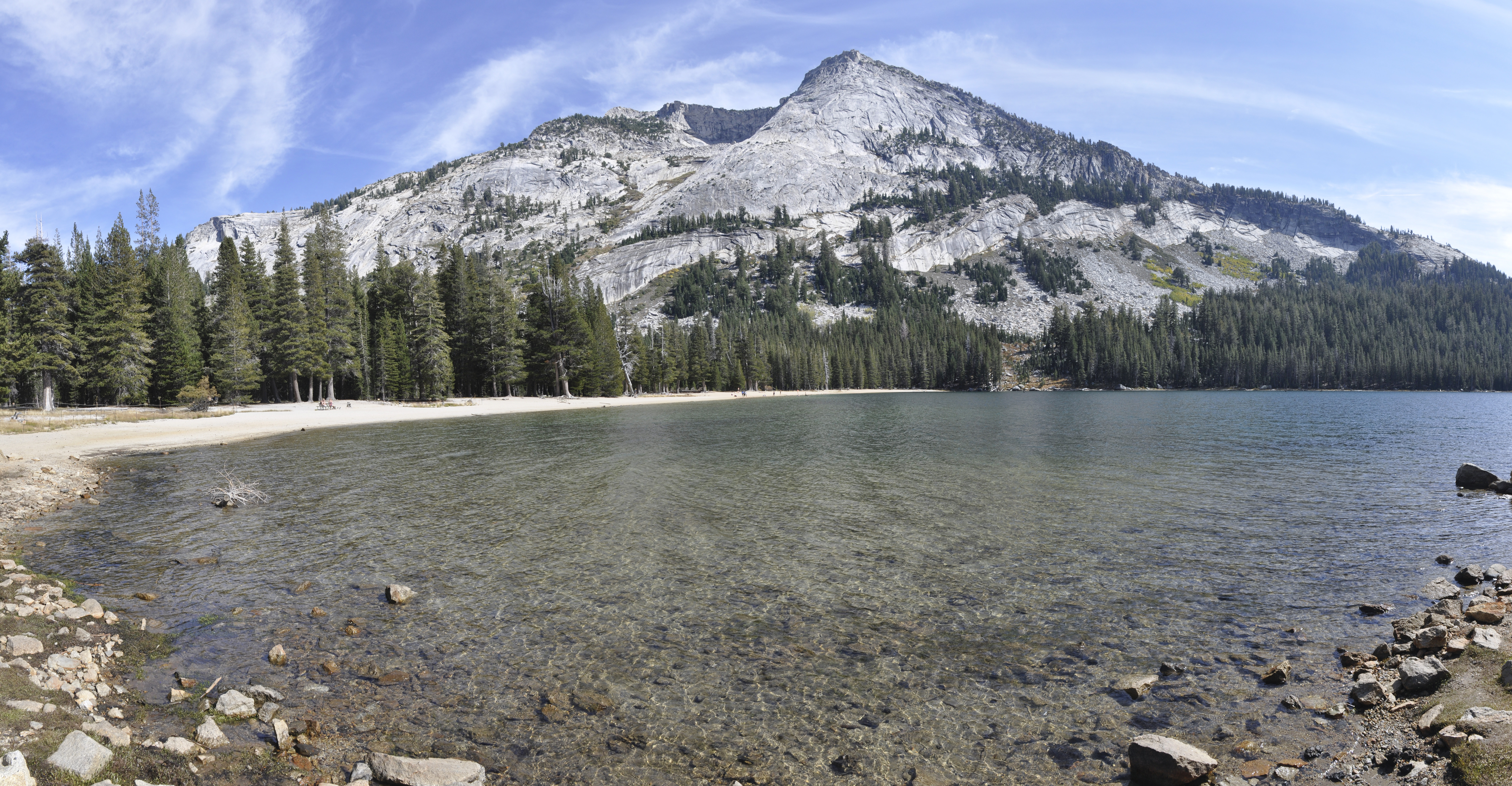
- Tenaya Peak above Tenaya Lake

Highest point
- Elevation: 10,306 ft (3,141 m) NAVD 88
- Prominence: 181 ft (55 m)
- Coordinates: 37°49′43″N 119°26′36″W

Geography
- Location within California Location within the United States
- Location: Yosemite National Park; Tuolumne County, California, U.S.
- Parent range: Sierra Nevada
- Topo map: USGS Tenaya Lake

Climbing
- Easiest route: Scramble (class 2)

Tenaya Peak is a mountain in the Yosemite high country, rising above Tenaya Lake. Tenaya Peak is named after Chief Tenaya, who met the Mariposa Battalion near the shores of the Tenaya lake. In 1851, the Mariposa Battalion under Captain John Boling expelled Chief Tenaya and his people from what was to become Yosemite National Park.

== Recreation ==
Tenaya Peak is a popular rock climbing destination, with multiple climbing ascents. There is also some class 2 and class 3 hikes to the summit.

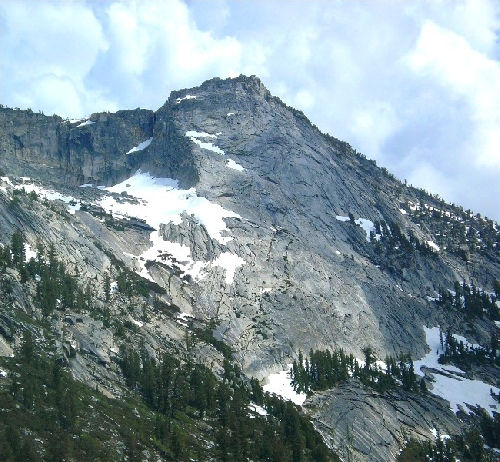
