= Tulare County Election Tree =

Historical place in Tulare County, United States

Tulare County Election Tree Charter Oak
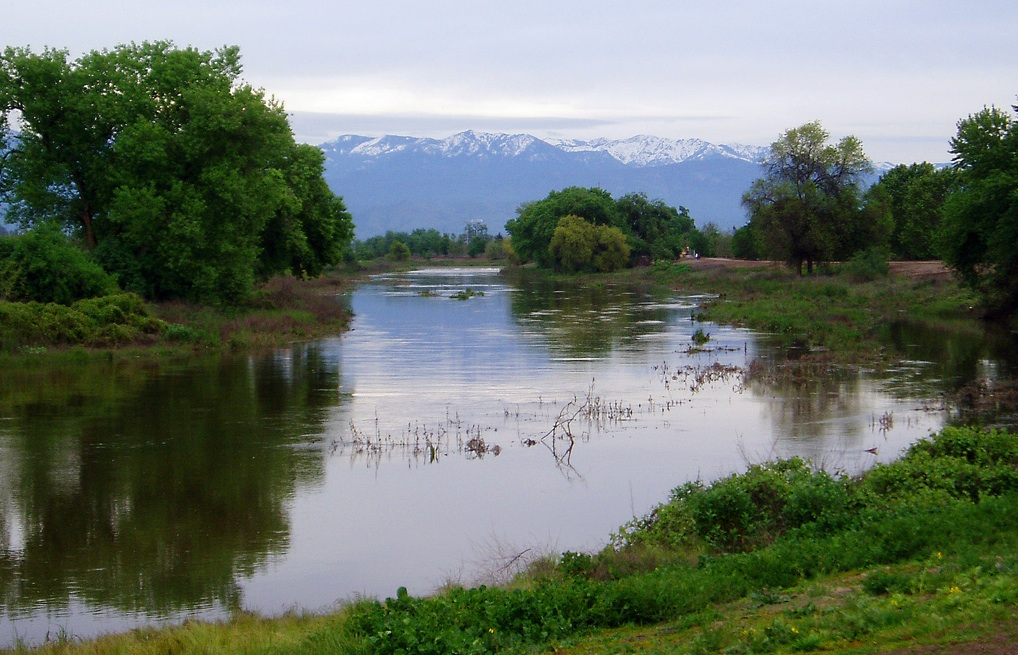
- River next to Tulare County Election Tree

- Location within California Location within the United States
- 36.358447°N 119.17640°W
- Location: Charter Oak Drive, Visalia, California.

History
- Built: July 10, 1852, 174 years ago

California Historical Landmark
- Designated: November 15, 1948
- Reference no.: 410

Tulare County Election Tree also called the Charter Oak is historical site in Visalia, California in Tulare County, California. The site of the Election Tree is a California Historical Landmark No. 410 listed on November 15, 1948. Under Tulare County Election Tree on July 10, 1852, Tulare County was founded. The election under the tree was headed by Major James D. Savage. The first county seat was in Woodville, California about one-half mile south of the Tulare County Election Tree. The Visalia and Woodville area near the Kaweah River delta, was known as the Four Creeks County, before the vote. A marker at the site was placed there by the Tulare County Historical Society on February 5, 2011, near the St. Johns River.

Major James D. Savage (1823–1852) was an officer in the United States Army during the Mexican–American War from 1846 to 1848. He also was part of the California Gold Rush. In the war he was a leader in the California Militia, and Mariposa Battalion that enter the Yosemite Valley. After the war he became a trader and businessman in early California.

== See also ==
- California Historical Landmarks in Tulare County
