= National Register of Historic Places listings in Glenn County, California =

Location of Glenn County in California

This is a list of the National Register of Historic Places listings in Glenn County, California.

This is intended to be a complete list of the properties and districts on the National Register of Historic Places in Glenn County, California, United States. Latitude and longitude coordinates are provided for many National Register properties and districts; these locations may be seen together in an online map.

There are 3 properties and districts listed on the National Register in the county.

This National Park Service list is complete through NPS recent listings posted May 1, 2026.

== Current listings ==
	Name on the Register	Image	Date listed	Location	City or town	Description
1	Gianella Bridge	Gianella Bridge	July 8, 1982 (#82004614)	CA 32; 39°45′04″N 121°59′46″W	Hamilton City	Oldest highway swing bridge in use in the United States at the time of its removal. Last swung to let river traffic pass in 1972. Replaced with a concrete bridge in 1987.
2	US Post Office-Willows Main	US Post Office-Willows Main	January 11, 1985 (#85000124)	315 W. Sycamore St. 39°31′14″N 122°12′27″W	Willows	
3	Willows-Glenn County Airport		October 6, 2023 (#100009029)	353 Cty. Rd. G 39°31′25″N 122°13′07″W	Willows	

== See also ==
- List of National Historic Landmarks in California
- National Register of Historic Places listings in California
- California Historical Landmarks in Glenn County, California
