= California Historical Landmarks in Mariposa County =

This list includes properties and districts listed on the California Historical Landmark listing in Mariposa County, California. Click the "Map of all coordinates" link to the right to view a Google map of all properties and districts with latitude and longitude coordinates in the table below.

Image		Landmark name	Location	City or town	Summary
Upload Photo	518	Agua Fria	Historic district 37°29′06″N 120°01′13″W	Agua Fria	Now ghost town
Bear Valley	331	Bear Valley	Historic district 37°34′08″N 120°07′10″W	Bear Valley	
Coulterville	332	Coulterville	Historic district 37°42′38″N 120°11′53″W	Coulterville	
Hornitos	333	Hornitos	Historic district 37°30′08″N 120°14′18″W	Hornitos	
Mariposa County Courthouse	670	Mariposa County Courthouse	10th and Bullion sts. 37°29′20″N 119°58′03″W	Mariposa	Also on the NRHP list as NPS-77000306
Mormon Bar	323	Mormon Bar	State Hwy 49 and Ben Hur Rd. 37°27′44″N 119°56′53″W	Mariposa	
Savage Trading Post	527	Savage Trading Post	State Hwy 140; 37°39′15″N 119°53′17″W	El Portal	
Yosemite Valley	790	Yosemite Valley	Yosemite National Park; 37°43′18″N 119°38′47″W	Yosemite National Park	Also on the NRHP list as NPS-04001159

== See also ==
- List of California Historical Landmarks
- National Register of Historic Places listings in Mariposa County, California
