= California Historical Landmarks in Tulare County =

This list includes properties and districts listed on the California Historical Landmark listing in Tulare County, California. Click the "Map of all coordinates" link to the right to view a Google map of all properties and districts with latitude and longitude coordinates in the table below.

| Image | | Landmark name | Location | City or town | Summary |
|---|---|---|---|---|---|
| Allensworth Historic Town Site | 1047 | Allensworth Historic Town Site | Colonel Allensworth State Historic Park, 4011 Grant Drive; 35°51′51″N 119°23′13″W | Earlimart | |
| Butterfield Stage Route | 471 | Butterfield Stage Route | SW corner of Hermosa St. and State Hwy. 65; 36°12′09″N 119°06′15″W | Lindsay | |
| Election Tree | 410 | Election Tree | Charter Oak Dr. 36°21′30″N 119°10′35″W | Visalia | |
| First Tule River Reservation | 388 | First Tule River Reservation | Alta Vista School, 2293 E. Crabtree Ave. 36°03′30″N 118°58′00″W | Porterville | |
| Fountain Springs | 648 | Fountain Springs | County Rds. J22 and M 109; 35°53′28″N 118°54′56″W | Fountain Springs | |
| Kaweah Post Office, Kaweah Colony | 389 | Kaweah Post Office, Kaweah Colony | 43795 N Fork Dr. 36°28′11″N 118°55′06″W | Kaweah | |
| Upload Photo | 413 | Tailholt | County Hwy M109 and County Hwy MI2; 35°48′40″N 118°50′34″W | White River | |
| Upload Photo | 934 | Tulare Assembly Center | Tulare County Fairgrounds; 36°11′57″N 119°20′32″W | Tulare | |
| Tule River Stage Station | 473 | Tule River Stage Station | Porterville Public Park; 36°04′47″N 119°01′10″W | Porterville | |

== See also ==
- List of California Historical Landmarks
- National Register of Historic Places listings in Tulare County, California
