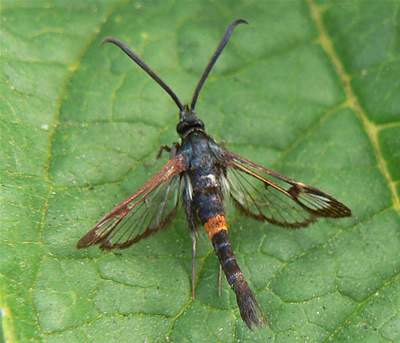

Scientific classification
- Kingdom: Animalia
- Phylum: Arthropoda
- Clade: Pancrustacea
- Class: Insecta
- Order: Lepidoptera
- Family: Sesiidae
- Genus: Synanthedon
- Species: S. myopaeformis

Binomial name
- Synanthedon myopaeformis (Borkhausen, 1789)

Synonyms
- Sphinx myopaeformis Borkhausen, 1789; Sesia myopiformis Staudinger, 1856; Sphinx zonata Donovan, 1797 (nec Drury, 1770); Sesia mutillaeformis Laspeyres, 1801; Sesia elegans Lederer, 1861; Synanthedon armeniaca Gorbunov, 1991; Sesia myopaeformis ab. bicingulata Rebel 1910 (nec Staudinger, 1887); Sphinx typhiaeformis Borkhausen, 1789; Sphinx tiphiaeformis Hübner, [1806]; Sesia typhiiformis Staudinger, 1856; Sesia cruentata Mann, 1859; Sesia cruentata ab. lugubris Ragusa, 1923; Sesia graeca Staudinger, 1871; Sesia luctuosa Lederer, 1853; Synanthedon mesoreaca Fischer & Lewandowski 2003

= Synanthedon myopaeformis =

Species of moth

Synanthedon myopaeformis is a moth of the family Sesiidae and the order Lepidoptera. In Europe it is known as the red-belted clearwing and in North America as the apple clearwing moth. The larvae create galleries under the bark of fruit trees, especially old trees with damaged trunks. During this process, the larvae cause significant damage to host trees. Particular attention has been paid to the damage they cause to apple trees. Their status as a pest of apple orchards has led to many research projects aimed at controlling populations of the moth. This moth is native to Europe, the Near East and North Africa. Recently, the moth was introduced into North America, being first detected in Canada in 2005. There are several organisms that threaten the larvae, including parasitoids, nematodes, and bacteria.

== Subspecies ==
- Synanthedon myopaeformis cruentata (Mann, 1859)
- Synanthedon myopaeformis graeca (Staudinger, 1871)
- Synanthedon myopaeformis luctuosa (Lederer, 1853)
- Synanthedon myopaeformis myopaeformis
- Synanthedon myopaeformis typhiaeformis (Borkhausen, 1789)

== Geographic range ==
Synanthedon myopaeformis is native to north Africa, western Asia, and Europe, where it is known as the red-belted clearwing moth. In 2005, it was discovered in southwestern Canada and has since been found in the United States. Throughout North America, S. myopaeformis is known as the apple clearwing moth because of its status as a pest of apple trees.

== Morphology ==
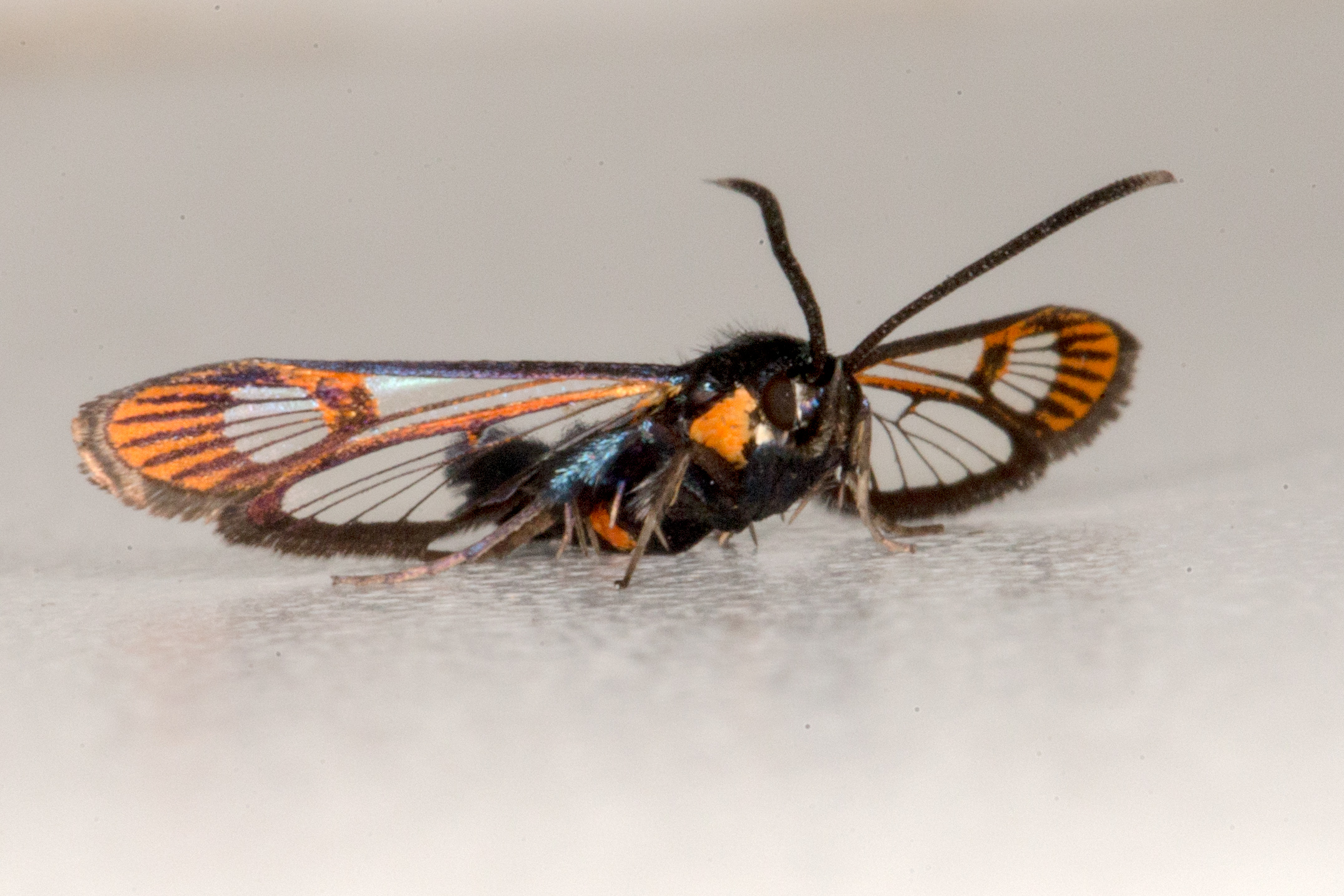
Synanthedon myopaeformis

Adults are blue-black in color with a dark orange-red stripe across their segmented abdomen. The moths have short, bushy tails. Their wings are clear in the middle with dark edges framed by short fringe. Wingspan varies between 1.8 and 2.8 cm at the forewings, with forewings narrower and longer than hindwings.

Caterpillars are 2.5 cm long, with off-white bodies and a reddish-brown head.

Pupae are around 1.5 cm long, and are golden brown with two tubercles, short projections, protruding from their heads. They can be seen sticking out of the bark of apple trees.

== Habitat ==
Because the life cycle of the moth is dependent on host trees, S. myopaeformis is found predominately near apple orchards. They are also found in gardens, woodlands and hedgerows. The larvae feed under the bark of apple trees, crab apples, pears, quinces, plums, cherries, apricots, hawthorn and mountain ash, favoring old cankerous trees.

In Canada, it has been found that both male and female moths are attracted to the flowers of showy milkweed (Asclepias speciosa) and that it is the phenylacetaldehyde produced by the flowers that attracts them. This substance can be used in monitoring populations of the moth or in mass-trapping them.

== Life cycle ==
=== Egg ===
Each female can lay up to 250 eggs. Eggs are laid singly on the bark of host trees, typically in cracks or damaged areas of the trunk and branches.

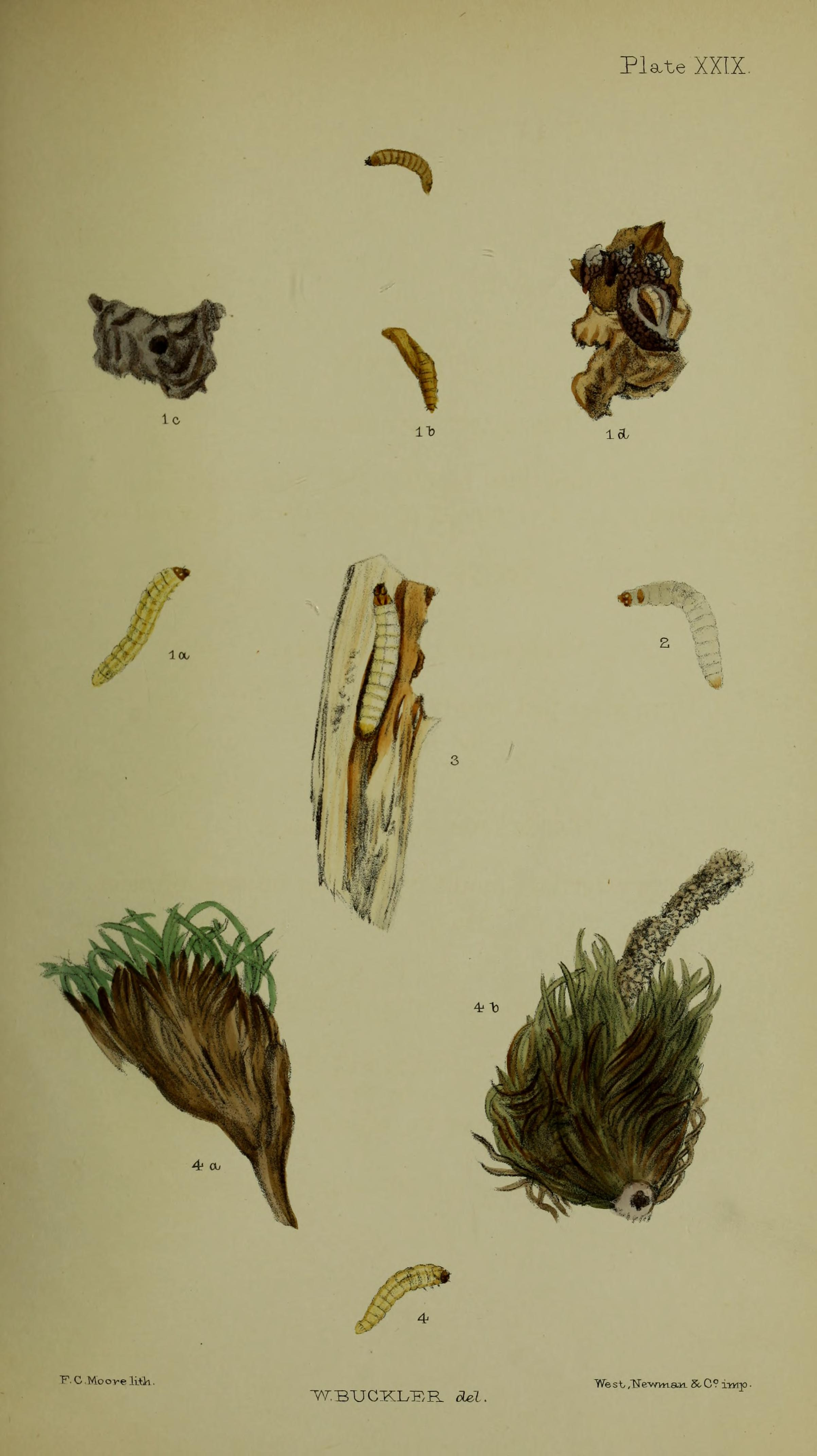
Figs.1 larva before last moult, 1a larva after last moult 1b pupa, 1c, 1d pieces of apple bark ravaged by the larva

=== Caterpillar ===
After hatching, larvae bore into the bark of the host trees, digging into the phloem of the tree. As they bore through the tree, they leave trails of waste that are visible from the outside of the tree. Larvae mature on the host tree for two years. During warm weather, the caterpillars move along the bark of the tree feeding on young plant tissues, including the buds of apple trees. At the beginning of winter, the caterpillars once again bore into the tree to spend the cold season under the bark. They emerge in early spring to feed. Larvae repeat this feeding – wintering cycle once more before emerging and boring a final hole in the bark in which to pupate.

=== Pupa ===
After burrowing into the bark, larvae compose golden brown cocoons which stick out from the tree. Compared to the larval stage, the pupal stage is much shorter at two weeks.

=== Adults ===
Adults emerge from their cocoons in early summer.

== Physiology ==
=== Flight activity ===
After emergence in early summer, adults are active in flight from May through August. Because Synanthedon myopaeformis thrives in warm weather, flight activity is temperature dependent. The adults are significantly less active on cold days compared to warm days. Flight activity ceases at the end of summer when average temperature drops to 15-16 °C.

=== Color vision ===
In 2014, Judd and Eby found that S. myopaeformis does not discriminate between yellow, green and white or between purple, blue, red, and black. The moths also display different behaviors toward traps reflecting green (500-550 nm) and ultraviolet (300-400 nm) light. A second study by Eby in 2012 showed that the moths are sensitive to the same wavelengths of light shown in the previously mentioned study, suggesting that the S. myopaeformis could have dichromatic vision.

== Enemies ==
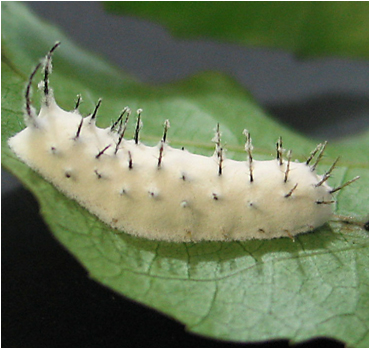
Beauveria bassiana, a threat to the S. myopaeformis, seen growing on an Ithominae larva

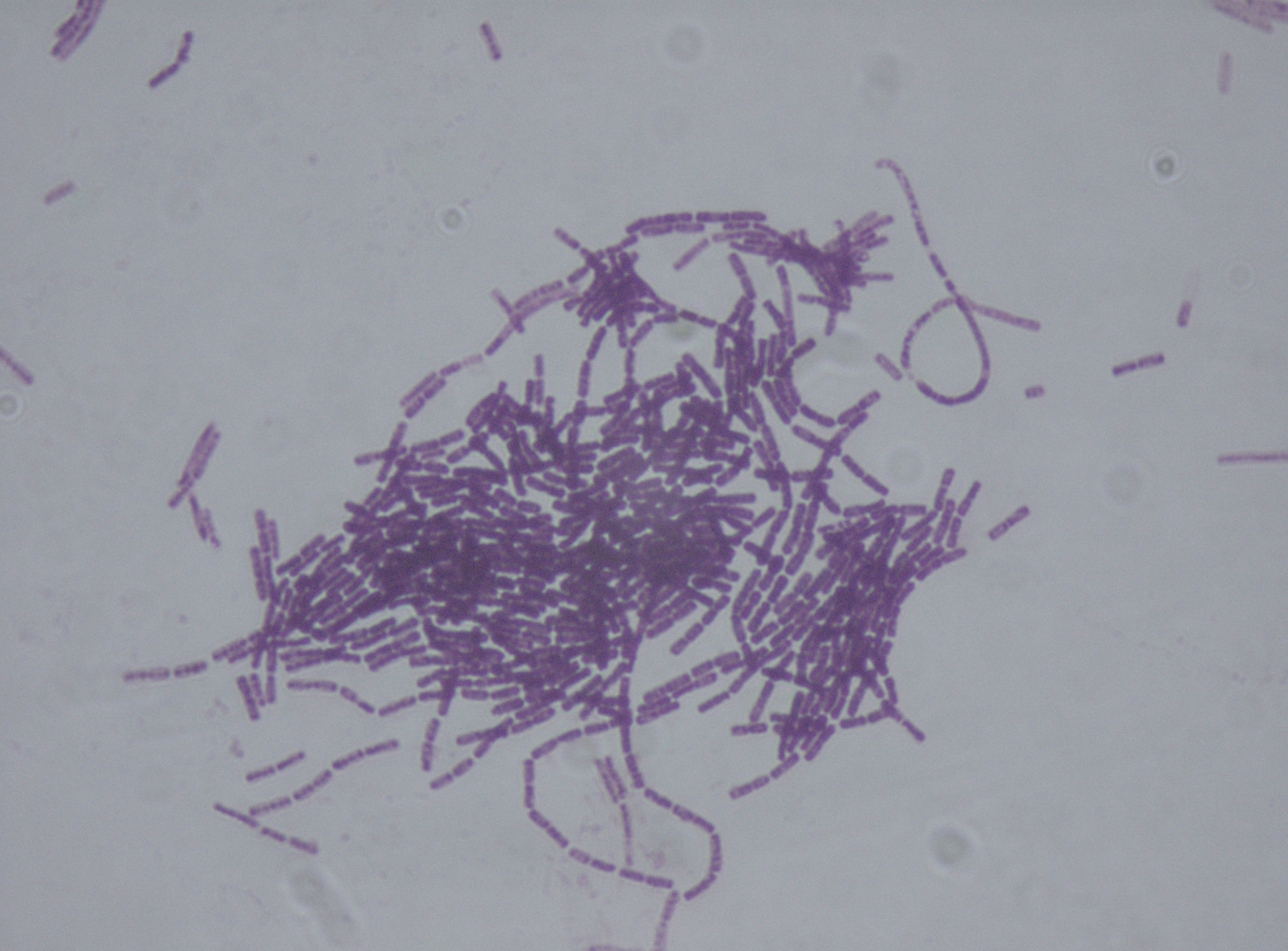
Bacillus thuringiensis, a threat to larvae

The parasitoid Liotryphan crassiseta is a significant cause of mortality in S. myopaeformis. Nematodes, Steinernema sp., are a threat to larvae, and larva mortality following exposure to the fungi Beauveria bassiana and Metarhizium brunneum is common. Bacteria are another threat to larvae. In 1999, Shehata, Nasr, and Tadros found that significantly fewer adults emerged from cocoons after larvae were exposed to the bacteria Bacillus thuringiensis.

== Mating ==
=== Pheromones ===
Males of the species respond to sex pheromones released by the glands of females. A 2010 study from Judd, Gries, Aurelian, and Gries found that 3,13-octadecadienyl acetate is the primary sex hormone used by S. myopaeformis females. This chemical alone is enough to attract males, although the females do also produce secondary sex pheromone in addition to 3,13-octadecadienyl acetate, these appear to play a minor role.

== Interactions with humans ==
=== Pest status ===
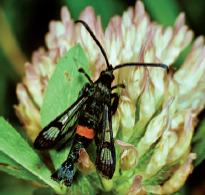
On a bud

Native to Europe, Asia, and northern Africa, but recently released in Canada and the United States, S. myopaeformis has been recognized as a significant threat to apple trees in these regions. Because the larvae bore holes and tunnels under and through the bark of their host trees, the presence of the species is harmful to the health and production of these trees. Previously, damage caused by S. myopaeformis was associated primarily with old, damaged, or otherwise sick apple trees because the lack of integrity of their bark allows the larvae easier access to the inner layers of the trunk and branches. However, their potential to harm even previously healthy apple trees is now recognized. Because of this, many methods have been tested for controlling the proliferation of the moth.

=== Attempted control methods ===
==== Pheromone disruption ====
One method of reproduction control involves the release of the S. myopaeformis sex pheromone into orchards infested by the species. The technique, mating disruption, leads to a dampened male response to female sex hormones, disrupting the mating process. As a result of the overabundance of pheromones, the percentage of mated females decreases relative to unmated females.

==== Pheromone traps ====
Many research studies have used pheromone traps to monitor the population of S. myopaformis. The traps enable monitoring of infestations even when the population is low, and so are an effective reference to determine the best time to apply pest-controlling measures or plant growth regulators. [20]

==== Other chemical lures ====
Other methods of control focus on luring and trapping adults. A Hungarian study found that both male and female red-belted clearwings are attracted to a combination of pear ester and acetic acid. Because many pheromone-based traps attract more males than females, this method is suggested as female-targeted trapping.

==== Other species ====
Each of the species mentioned above in the “Enemies” section have been used to control populations. These include nematodes, fungi, and bacteria.

==== Trunk coatings ====
Diverse materials have been used to coat the bark of apple trees in an attempt to kill S. myopaeformis eggs and larvae. In 2010, the effectiveness of cotton seed oil, lime, and motor oil were tested in decreasing the number of adults and pupae. All three materials reduced the number of adult moths during the second year, but the oils showed the greatest effect.
