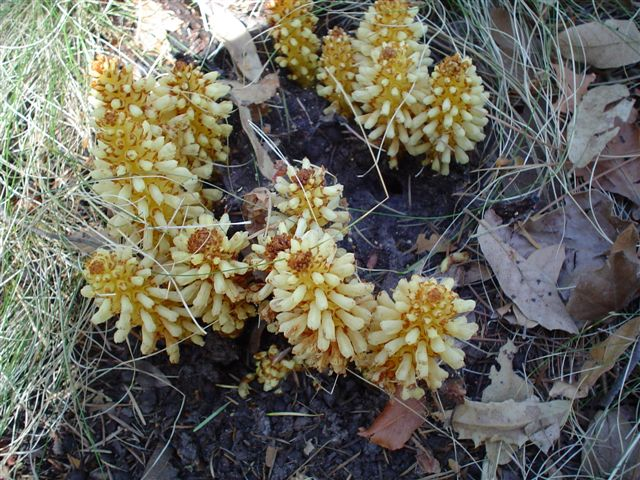

Conservation status
- Secure (NatureServe)

Scientific classification
- Kingdom: Plantae
- Clade: Tracheophytes
- Clade: Angiosperms
- Clade: Eudicots
- Clade: Asterids
- Order: Lamiales
- Family: Orobanchaceae
- Genus: Conopholis
- Species: C. alpina

Binomial name
- Conopholis alpina Liebm.

Synonyms
- List: Conopholis americana; Conopholis mexicana; Conopholis sylvatica; Myzorrhiza xanthochroa; Orobanche xanthochroa

= Conopholis alpina =

Plant species in the broomrape family

Conopholis alpina, known as the alpine cancer-root, is an achlorophyllous (lacking chlorophyll), root parasitic plant (holoparasite).

It is native to Northern Mexico, and to the Southwestern United States in New Mexico, Arizona, Colorado, and Texas.

== Taxonomy ==
Conopholis alpina was scientifically described and named in 1847 by Frederik Liebmann. It is classified in the genus Conopholis as part of the family Orobanchaceae. It has no accepted varieties, but has one in its seven heterotypic synonyms.

Table of Synonyms
Name	Year	Rank
Conopholis alpina var. mexicana (A.Gray ex S.Watson) R.R.Haynes	1971	variety
Conopholis americana Endl.	1839	species
Conopholis mexicana A.Gray ex S.Watson	1882	species
Conopholis sylvatica Liebm.	1847	species
Myzorrhiza xanthochroa (A.Nelson & Cockerell) Rydb.	1909	species
Orobanche multiflora var. xanthochroa (A.Nelson & Cockerell) Munz	1930	variety
Orobanche xanthochroa A.Nelson & Cockerell	1904	species
