= Squaw root =

Squaw root (also spelled Squawroot or Squaw-root) is a common name which can refer to a number of different herbs native to North America:

- Actaea racemosa
- Caulophyllum thalictroides
- Conopholis americana
- Perideridia gairdneri
