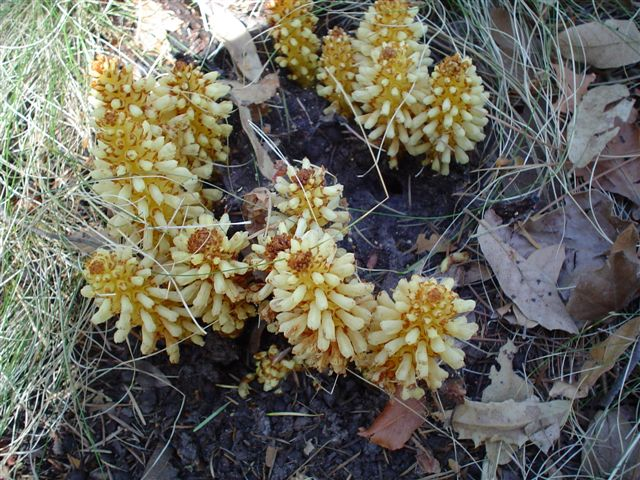
- Conopholis alpina

Scientific classification
- Kingdom: Plantae
- Clade: Tracheophytes
- Clade: Angiosperms
- Clade: Eudicots
- Clade: Asterids
- Order: Lamiales
- Family: Orobanchaceae
- Tribe: Orobancheae
- Genus: Conopholis; Wallr.

Species
- Conopholis alpina; var. mexicana; Conopholis americana

= Conopholis =

Genus of flowering plants in the broomrape family

Conopholis is a small genus of flowering plants in the family Orobanchaceae.

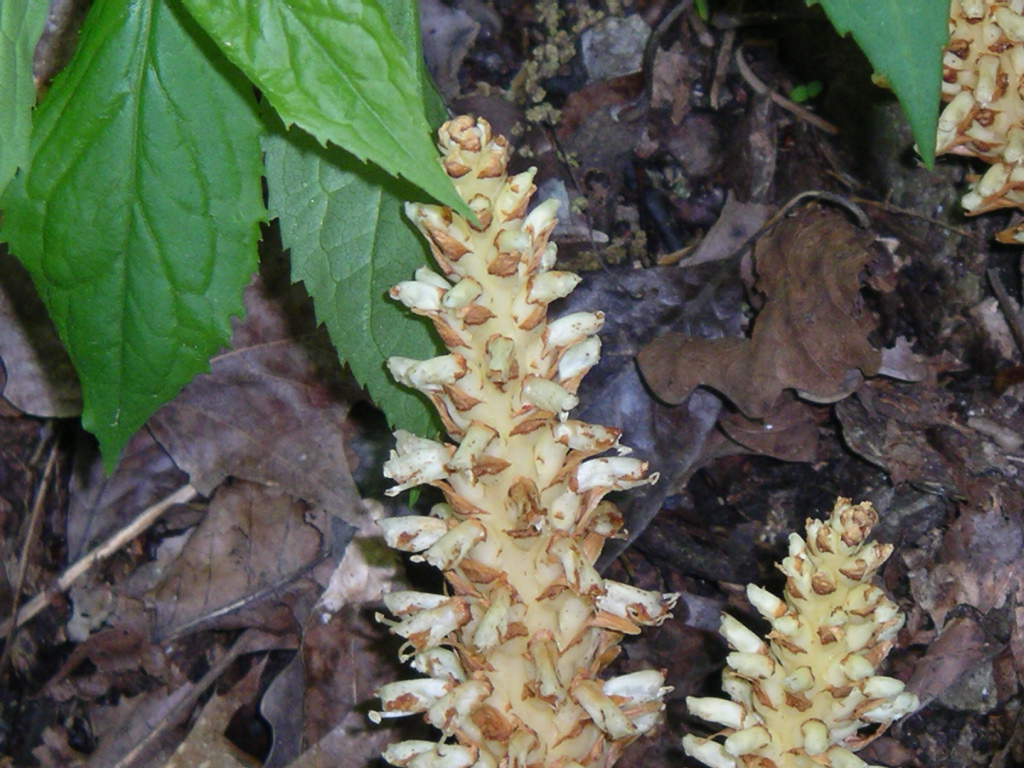
Conopholis americana

== Species ==
- Conopholis alpina, alpine cancer-root
  - Conopholis alpina var. mexicana, Mexican cancer-root.
- Conopholis americana, American cancer-root. In the American Blue Ridge Mountains, C. americana is called "bear corn" because it resembles an ear of corn.
