= C. Gregory Crampton =

American historian

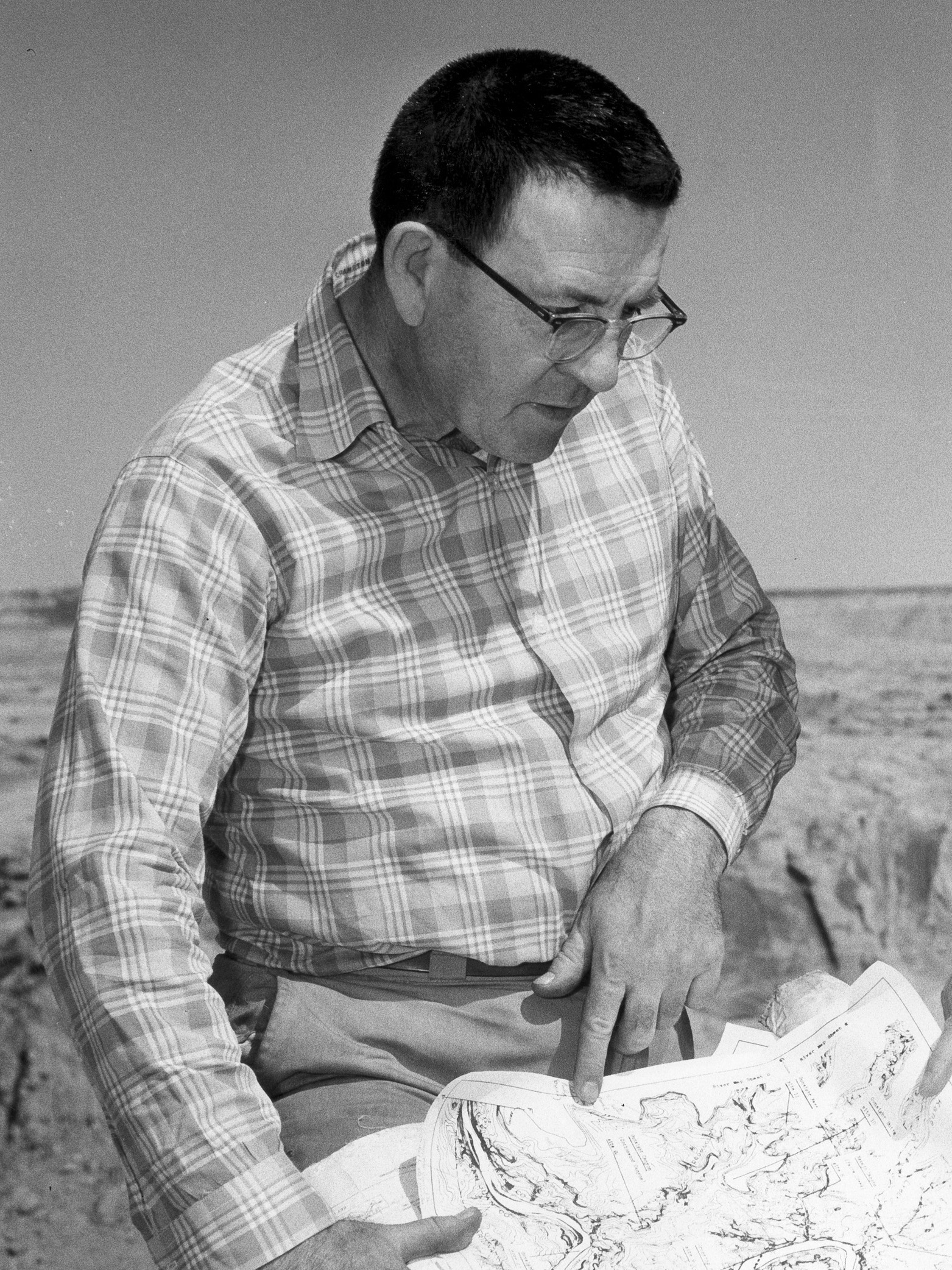
- Born: March 22, 1911; Kankakee, Illinois
- Died: May 2, 1995 (aged 83); St. George, Utah
- Occupation: Historian

Charles Gregory Crampton (March 22, 1911 – May 2, 1995) was a historian at the University of Utah best known for documenting cultures and artifacts in Glen Canyon before it was flooded by the Glen Canyon Dam.

Born in Kankakee, Illinois, he moved with his parents to Delhi, California, where the family tried to run a farm, mostly unsuccessfully. The family travelled from Illinois to California by automobile, and Crampton credits this trip with inculcating in him an interest in the American West. Crampton attended the University of California, Berkeley, earning an AB (1935), MA (1936) and PhD (1941) in history. His thesis concerned the history of mining in Mariposa, California, with an emphasis on the land grant of John Charles Fremont. During World War II he worked with the quartermaster corps. In 1945 he began his career as a professor at the University of Utah.

In the early 1950s, the Bancroft Library at UC Berkeley obtained an original manuscript of a member of the Mariposa Battalion expedition. Largely on the basis of the fact that Crampton's PhD thesis covered some of that history, he was requested to edit this work, which was published in 1957.

In 1956 Crampton was awarded a grant to study the cultures and retrieve artifacts from the area which was to be flooded by the Glen Canyon Dam. He subsequently wrote several books and articles about his findings.

Crampton received an Award of Merit in 1983 from the Western History Association. His book Standing Up Country won the Best Western Non-Fiction Award of the National Cowboy Hall of Fame and Western Heritage Center.

Crampton retired in 1979 and died at his home in St. George, Utah, on May 2, 1995.
