= List of California Historical Landmarks =

Below is a list of California Historical Landmarks organized by county.

== List ==
- Alameda County
- Alpine County
- Amador County
- Butte County
- Calaveras County
- Colusa County
- Contra Costa County
- Del Norte County
- El Dorado County
- Fresno County
- Glenn County
- Humboldt County
- Imperial County
- Inyo County
- Kern County
- Kings County
- Lake County
- Lassen County
- Los Angeles County
- Madera County
- Marin County
- Mariposa County
- Mendocino County
- Merced County
- Modoc County
- Mono County
- Monterey County
- Napa County
- Nevada County
- Orange County
- Placer County
- Plumas County
- Riverside County
- Sacramento County
- San Benito County
- San Bernardino County
- San Diego County
- San Francisco County
- San Joaquin County
- San Luis Obispo County
- San Mateo County
- Santa Barbara County
- Santa Clara County
- Santa Cruz County
- Shasta County
- Sierra County
- Siskiyou County
- Solano County
- Sonoma County
- Stanislaus County
- Sutter County
- Tehama County
- Trinity County
- Tulare County
- Tuolumne County
- Ventura County
- Yolo County
- Yuba County

== See also ==
- Bibliography of California history
- National Register of Historic Places listings in California
- List of National Historic Landmarks in California
