= California Historical Landmarks in Glenn County =

This list includes properties and districts listed on the California Historical Landmark listing in Glenn County, California. Click the "Map of all coordinates" link to the right to view a Google map of all properties and districts with latitude and longitude coordinates in the table below.

Image		Landmark name	Location	City or town	Summary
Granville P. Swift Adobe	345	Granville P. Swift Adobe	Old Hwy 99 at Hambright Creek; 39°45′36″N 122°11′48″W	Orland	
Site of First Posted Water Notice by Will S. Green	831	Site of First Posted Water Notice by Will S. Green	Cutler and 1st Ave. 39°47′12″N 122°02′55″W	Hamilton City	

== See also ==
- List of California Historical Landmarks
- National Register of Historic Places listings in Glenn County, California
