= Whiteleaf manzanita =

Whiteleaf manzanita may refer to either of two plant species of the genus Arctostaphylos:

- Arctostaphylos manzanita
- Arctostaphylos viscida
