= Alum root =

The common name for the Alumroot is Coral bells. The scientific name of the Alumroot is Heuchera. The First Nations or Inuit name for the Alumroot is rat root. Alum root or Alumroot is a common name for some species of two different genera of flowering plants:

- Heuchera, also called coralbells
- Geranium, also called wild geranium or cranesbills
