= Plateau Creek (Colorado) =

Creek in Mesa County, Colorado, United States

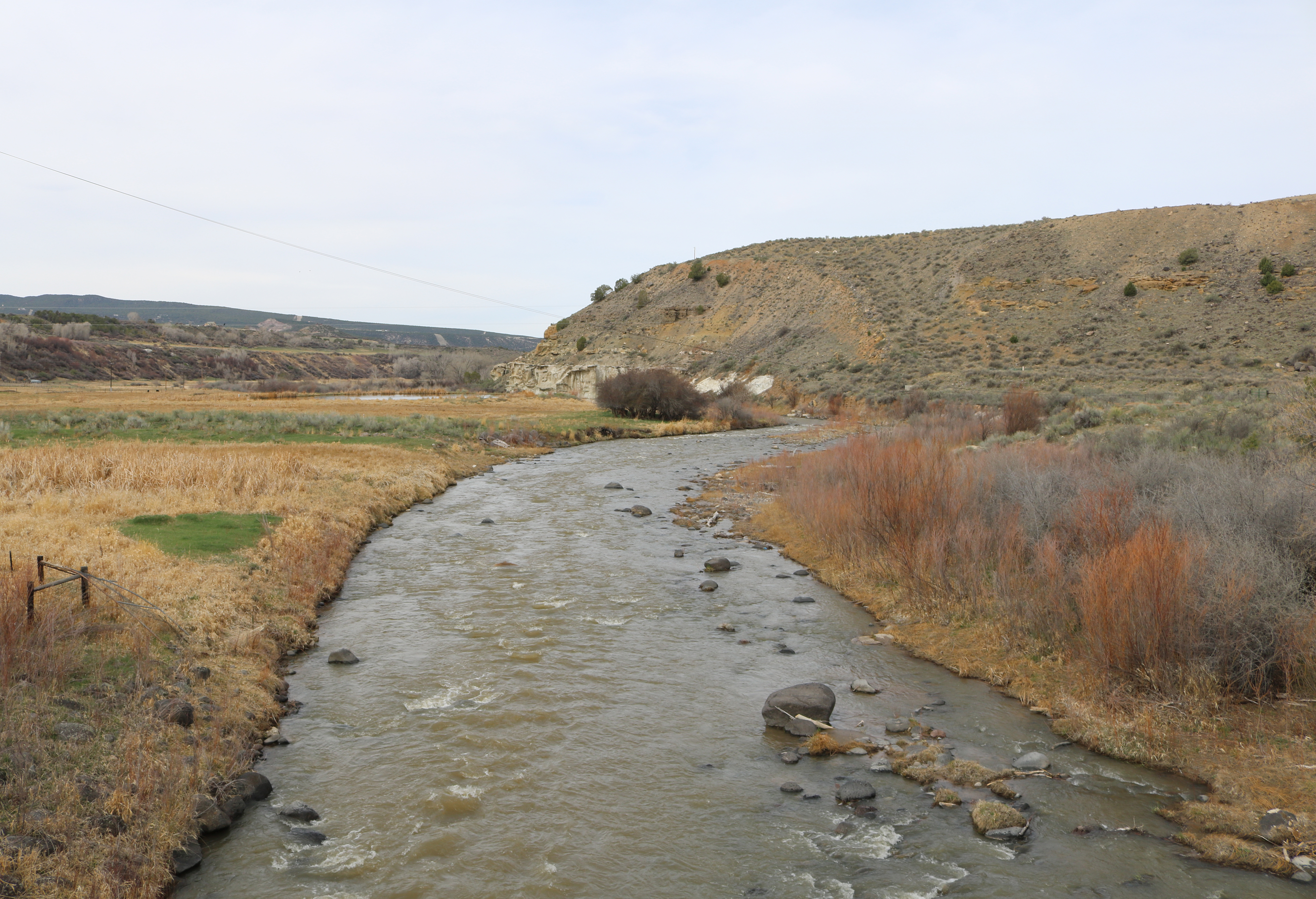
- Plateau Creek

Physical characteristics
- Source
  - coordinates: 39°25′50″N 108°07′36″W
- Mouth
  - location: Confluence with Colorado River
  - coordinates: 39°10′02″N 108°16′52″W
  - elevation: 4,770 ft (1,450 m)

Basin features
- Progression: Colorado

Plateau Creek is a tributary of the Colorado River, approximately 50 miles (80 km) long, in Mesa County, Colorado, United States. It drains a cattle ranching valley, known as Plateau Valley, north of the Grand Mesa and east of Grand Junction.

== Description ==
The creek rises in northeastern Mesa County, in the Grand Mesa National Forest and descends through a narrow canyon to the northwest, passing north of Vega State Park. It enters the Plateau Valley at Collbran, the largest community in the valley. It flows generally west along the north edge of the Grand Mesa uplands, past Molina. State Highway 330 follows the creek through the valley, crossing it several times. Near the junction of State Highway 330 and State Highway 65 it enters a narrow canyon for the lower 8 miles (13 km), followed by State Highway 65. It joins the Colorado from the east in De Beque Canyon approximately 15 miles (24 km) east of Grand Junction.

== See also ==
- List of rivers of Colorado
- List of tributaries of the Colorado River
