= American dogwood =

American dogwood may refer to:

- Cornus florida, a deciduous tree also known as flowering dogwood
- Cornus sericea, a deciduous shrub also known as red osier dogwood
- Record label, Shaboozey's imprint label under Empire Distribution
