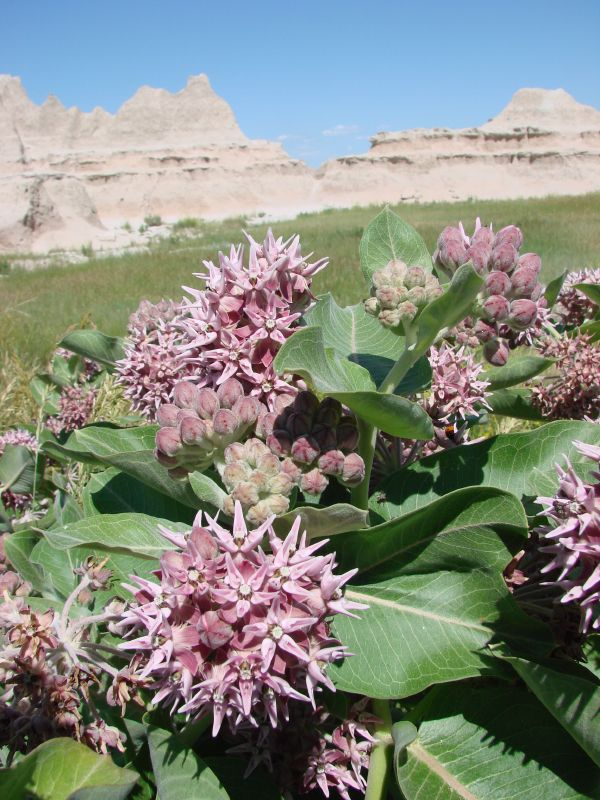

Conservation status
- Secure (NatureServe)

Scientific classification
- Kingdom: Plantae
- Clade: Tracheophytes
- Clade: Angiosperms
- Clade: Eudicots
- Clade: Asterids
- Order: Gentianales
- Family: Apocynaceae
- Genus: Asclepias
- Species: A. speciosa

Binomial name
- Asclepias speciosa Torr.

= Asclepias speciosa =

Species of flowering plant

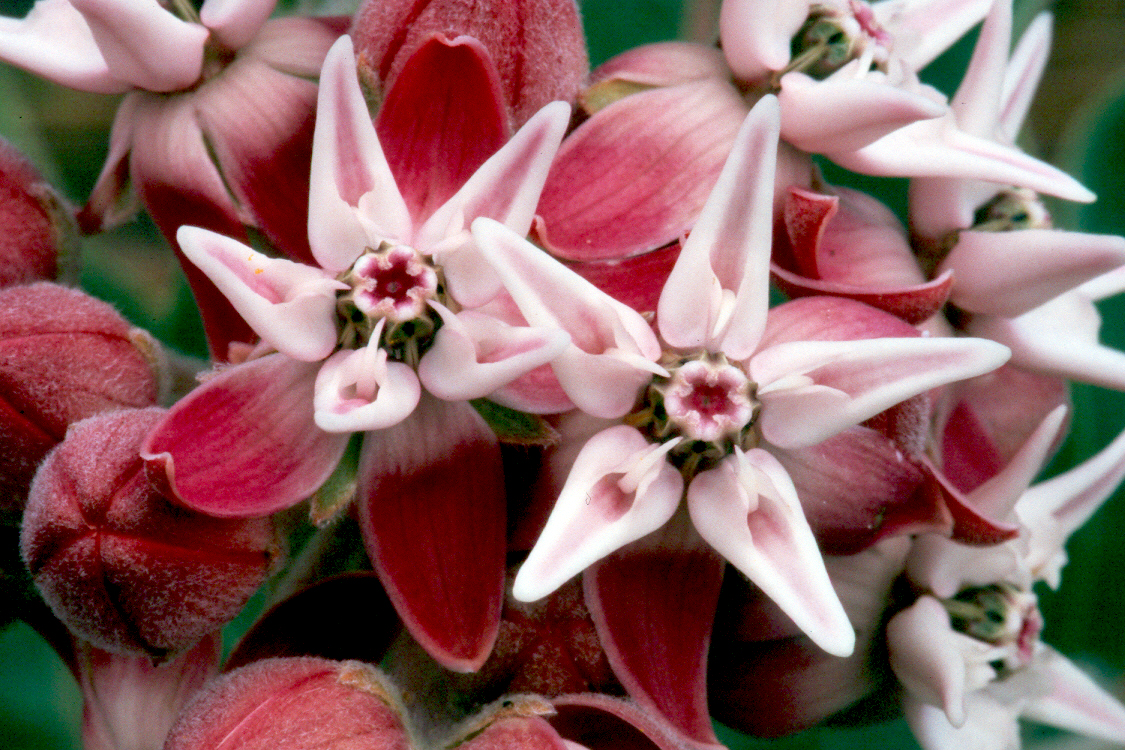
Asclepias speciosa, West Eugene wetlands, Oregon

Asclepias speciosa is a milky-sapped perennial plant in the dogbane family (Apocynaceae), known commonly as the showy milkweed and is found in the western half of North America.

== Description ==
This flowering plant is a hairy, erect perennial growing up to 120 cm (47 in) in height. The pointed, elongate, simple, entire leaves are about 10–20 cm (4–8 in) long and arranged oppositely on stalks. Milky sap is released when the leaves or stems are bruised or cut.

The flowers are about 2 cm (3/4 in) wide, hirsute, pale pink to pinkish-purple, and occur in dense umbellate cymes. Their corollas are reflexed and the central flower parts, five hoods with prominent hooks, form a star shape. The fruit is a rough follicle about 5–10 cm (2–4 in) long and filled with many flat oval seeds, each with silky hairs.

This species flowers from May through August.

Many other species in the genus Asclepias are toxic, particularly to livestock.

== Distribution and habitat ==
This species is native to the western half of North America, including British Columbia and from the Cascade Range in California east to the central United States. It grows along streams, dry slopes, open woodland areas, and roadsides.

== Ecology ==
Asclepias speciosa is a specific monarch butterfly food and habitat plant. Additionally, phenylacetaldehyde produced by the plants attracts Synanthedon myopaeformis, the red-belted clearwing moth. It is also a larval host for the dogbane tiger moth and the queen butterfly.

Monarch Watch provides information on rearing monarchs and their host plants. Efforts to restore falling monarch butterfly populations by establishing butterfly gardens and monarch migratory "waystations" require particular attention to the target species' food preferences and population cycles, as well to the conditions needed to propagate and maintain their food plants.

For example, where it grows in Michigan and surrounding areas and in the western US, monarchs reproduce on A. speciosa, especially when its foliage is soft and fresh. Because monarch reproduction in those areas peaks in late summer when milkweed foliage is old and tough, A. speciosa needs to be mowed or cut back in June or July to assure that it will be regrowing rapidly when monarch reproduction reaches its peak.

The seeds of some milkweeds need periods of cold treatment (cold stratification) before they will germinate. To protect seeds from washing away during heavy rains and from seed–eating birds, one can cover the seeds with a light fabric or with an 13 mm (0.5 in) layer of straw mulch. However, mulch acts as an insulator. Thicker layers of mulch can prevent seeds from germinating if they prevent soil temperatures from rising enough when winter ends. Further, few seedlings can push through a thick layer of mulch.

== Uses ==
Native Americans used fiber in the stems for rope, basketry, and nets. Some Native Americans used the milky sap for medicinal purposes.

Although care is needed to distinguish the species from highly toxic species in the genus, the young leaves and seed pods of A. speciosa can be boiled and eaten.
