= Tenaya =

Chief of the Ahwahnechee people in Yosemite in 1851

Tenaya (died 1853) was a leader of the Ahwahnechee people of the Yosemite Valley in California.

== Background ==
The Paiute people of Yosemite Valley called themselves the Ahwahnechee, meaning “dwellers in Ahwahnee.” Ahwahnee was the name of a village on Black Oak Flat in Yosemite Valley. The name also referred to a large tract of land surrounding the village. Indigenous people who lived outside the Yosemite Valley often referred to the whole valley as Ahwahnee.

The Ahwahnechee lived in Yosemite Valley until around 1800, when most of them died from an epidemic (probably smallpox). Those who survived the epidemic, including their chief, left the Yosemite Valley. They travelled from Big Oak Flat through Tamarack Flat, past Tenaya Lake, thence to Tuolumne Meadows, then east through Mono Pass into Bloody Canyon, finally arriving in the Mono Basin. They settled there, joining the Kucadikadi (a band of Northern Paiute people who live near Mono Lake). Having fully assimilated into the Kucadikadi band, the chief of the Ahwahnechees married one of their women, who gave birth to Tenaya. Tenaya grew up among the Kucadikadi people.

== Leadership ==
When Tenaya became a young man, an Ahwahnechee medicine man and friend of his father persuaded Tenaya to return to the Yosemite Valley. Tenaya took his four wives, along with the remnants of the Ahwahnechee people that had been living with the Kucadikadi band, and they reestablished themselves in Yosemite Valley with him as their leader.

By 1851, conflicts between the non-indigenous miners and the indigenous peoples in the area had increased. The United States Army forced the California tribes to sign treaties that relinquished their rights to their traditional lands in exchange for reservations. The Mariposa Battalion was formed to carry out the relocation of the Ahwahnechee people, marching Tenaya and his people to the Fresno Reservation. As they approached the Fresno Reservation, many of them fled back to the Yosemite Valley. They were pursued by elements of the Mariposa Battalion, who killed Tenaya's youngest son and captured the rest. Tenaya was forcibly taken back to the reservation.

In the summer of 1851, Tenaya was released from the reservation after he promised his people would no longer interfere with the white settlers. Some others members of his band escaped the reservation and followed him.

In May 1852, a group of prospectors entered Yosemite Valley and were attacked by Tenaya's warriors. Two of the miners were killed. In retaliation, an Army detachment was dispatched from Fort Miller. The soldiers killed six Ahwahnechee warriors, but Tenaya and the rest of the band escaped over Mono Pass to Mono Lake, where they were given refuge by the Kucadikadi band.

== Death ==
Tenaya and his small band of Ahwahnechee people stayed as guests of the Kucadikadi in the Mono Lake area. They finally returned to the Yosemite Valley in the early autumn of 1853. Soon after this, some of Tenaya’s men stole some horses from the Kucadikadi and brought them into the Yosemite Valley. The Kucadikadi went into the valley on a punitive expedition, seeking revenge against the Ahwahnechee.

Upon arriving at Ahwahnee, the chief of the Kucadikadi threw a rock at Tenaya, striking him in the head and fracturing his skull. Several more rocks were thrown, and Tenaya was stoned to death. Only eight of Tenaya’s warriors survived the attack. The surviving warriors escaped by descending through Tenaya Canyon, while women and children were captured and taken across the mountains back to the Mono Lake area.

== Legacy ==
Tenaya had a granddaughter named To-tu-ya (also known as Maria Lebrado). The last full-blooded Ahwahnechee, she died in 1931.

Tenaya Lake, Tenaya Peak, and Tenaya Canyon were all named after Tenaya. Tenaya Middle Schools in Fresno, California and Merced, California are named after him. An elementary school in Groveland, California is also named after Chief Tenaya.

== See also ==
- History of the Yosemite area
