= Mule's ear =

Mule's ear is a common name for a group of plants in the sunflower family (Asteraceae) which were previously all placed in the genus Wyethia, but are now classified in the following genera:

- Agnorhiza
- Scabrethia
- Wyethia
