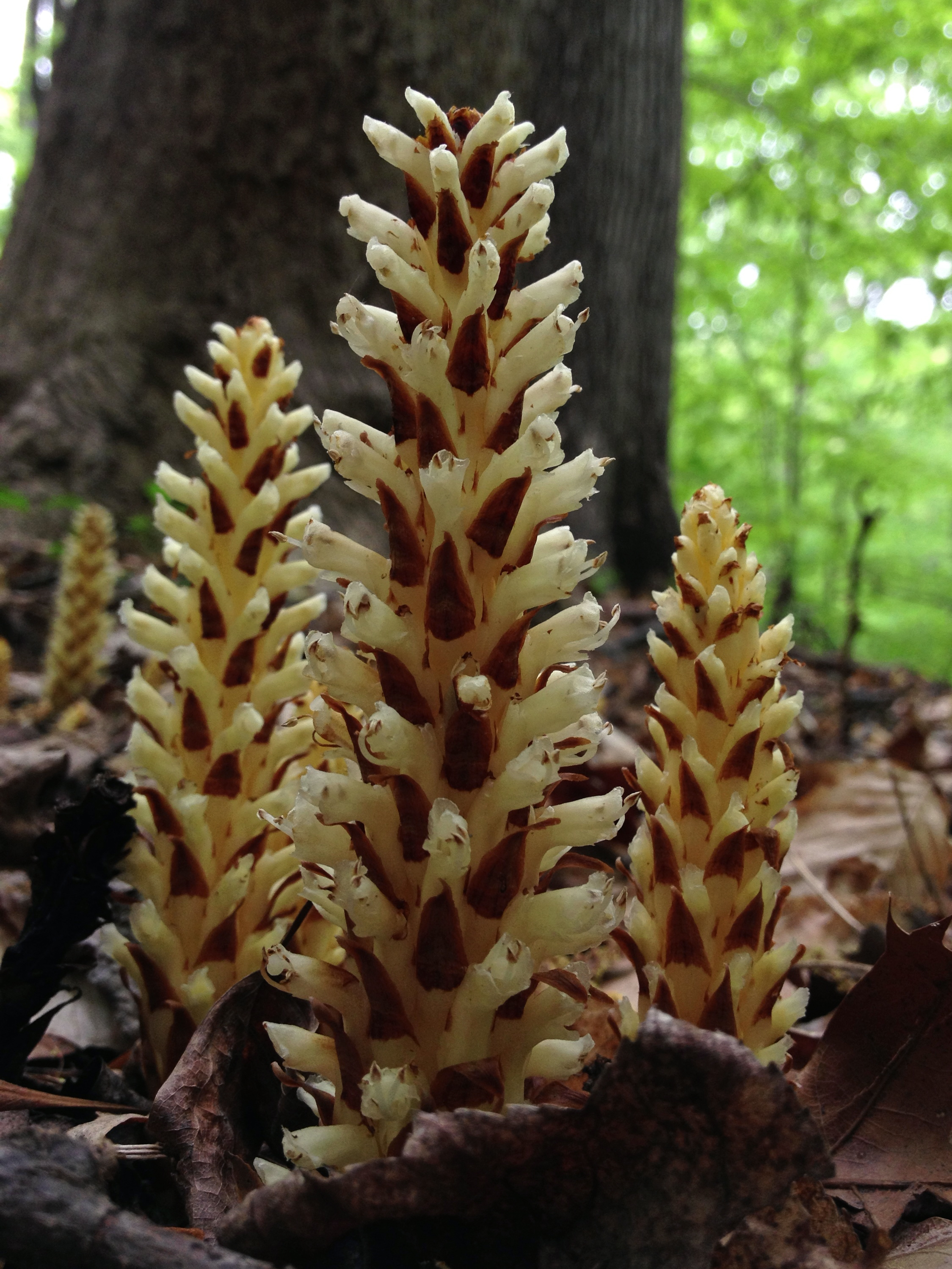

Conservation status
- Secure (NatureServe)

Scientific classification
- Kingdom: Plantae
- Clade: Tracheophytes
- Clade: Angiosperms
- Clade: Eudicots
- Clade: Asterids
- Order: Lamiales
- Family: Orobanchaceae
- Genus: Conopholis
- Species: C. americana

Binomial name
- Conopholis americana (L.) Wallr.
- Range of Conopholis americana

Synonyms
- Orobanche americana L.

= Conopholis americana =

Species of flowering plant

Conopholis americana, the American cancer-root, bumeh or squawroot or bear corn, is a perennial, non-photosynthesizing (or "achlorophyllous") parasitic plant. It is from the family Orobanchaceae and more recently from the genus Conopholis but also listed as Orobanche, native but not endemic to North America. When blooming, it resembles a pine cone or cob of corn growing from the roots of mostly oak and beech trees.

== Description ==
Conopholis americana is parasitic on the roots of woody plants, especially oaks (genus Quercus) and beech (genus Fagus). The only part of the plant generally seen is the cone-shaped inflorescence, which appears above ground in spring. The entire structure is a yellowish color, turning to brown. It achieves heights of 10 centimeters (4 in) to 20 centimeters (8 in) tall.

=== Stems and leaves ===
The plant has stout and unbranched 1.3 centimeters (0.5 in) to 2.5 centimeters (1 in) thick stems. Since C. americana does not photosynthesize it also does not have true leaves; it has instead simple, ovate, tiny scales 1.3 centimeters (0.5 in) long and brown, which appear at the base of each flower.

=== Flowers ===
Conopholis americana produces spikes of yellow to cream flowers densely crowded all around the stem. Each flower is 5-parted, 8 millimeters (0.3 in) to 13 millimeters (0.5 in) long, tubular with a swollen base and facing downwards. As the flowering spike matures it begins to wither and becomes brown throughout the summer and often persisting through the winter, by which time it has become shriveled and black. There is no noticeable floral scent.

=== Fruits and reproduction ===
Each flower is replaced by a seed capsule that is longer than it is wide and contains many small seeds. This plant spreads to new locations by reseeding itself.

=== Roots ===
The root system is parasitic on the roots of oak trees (Quercus spp.); dependent on the host tree for its nourishment, the suckers of the parasitic roots cause the formation of large rounded knobs on the roots of the host tree.

== Distribution ==
The plant is found growing on roots in wooded ravines in every state of the United States east of the Mississippi River. While widely distributed, it is uncommon.

Native:

Nearctic:

Northern America:

Eastern Canada: Nova Scotia, Ontario, Quebec
Western Canada: British Columbia
Northeastern U.S.A.: Connecticut, Indiana, Maine, Massachusetts, Michigan, New Hampshire, New Jersey, New York, Ohio, Pennsylvania, Rhode Island, Vermont, West Virginia
North-Central U.S.A.: Illinois, Wisconsin
Southeastern U.S.A.: Alabama, Delaware, Florida, Georgia, Kentucky, Maryland, North Carolina, South Carolina, Tennessee, Virginia

It is considered a vulnerable species in New Hampshire and Vermont, and an imperiled species in Rhode Island and Delaware.
