= Mariposa Battalion =

California Militia unit formed in 1851

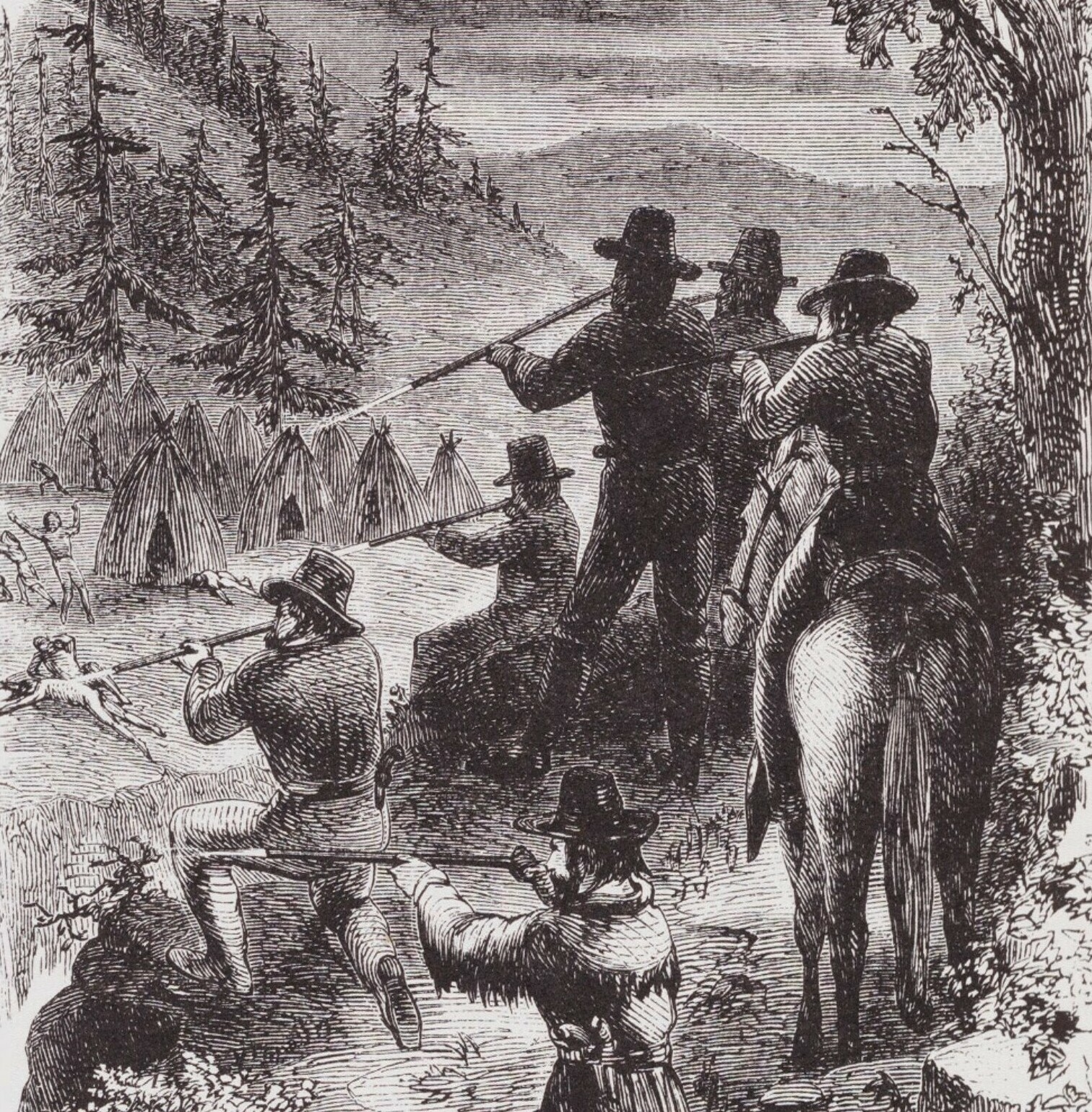
An illustration of Californian militiamen during the California genocide

Mariposa Battalion was a California Militia unit formed in 1851 to defeat the Ahwahnechee and Chowchillas in the Mariposa War, a part of the California genocide.

After a force under Mariposa County Sheriff James Burney was found unequal to the task of defeating the Native Californians, Burney made an appeal to Governor John McDougal for help. This led to authorizing an organization of two hundred men into the Mariposa Battalion.

The Mariposa Battalion was mustered 12 February 1851. Sheriff Burney was the first choice for the major to command the unit, but Burney declined due to his other responsibilities in Mariposa. Instead, James D. Savage was chosen as major, primarily due to his scouting abilities. The battalion was divided into three companies: Company A commanded by John J. Kuykendall, with seventy men; Company B under John Boling, with seventy-two men; and Company C, under William Dill, with fifty-five men. Other officers elected included M. B. Lewis as Adjutant, A. Brunson as surgeon and Vincent Hailor as guide.

A camp was established two and a half miles (four kilometers) from the town of Mariposa near Savage's Agua Fria trading post. As part of the Mariposa War, the battalion entered the Yosemite Valley and burned Native American villages and food supplies and forcibly relocated people from their homes in the valley. To Tu Ya "Maria" Lebrado Ydrte was one of the survivors and later retold the story of the massacre.
