= Mariposa County Unified School District =

School district in California, United States

Location
- 5082 Old Highway North Mariposa, California, 95338; United States

District information
- Superintendent: Jeff Aranguena
- Schools: 7
- NCES District ID: 0623940

Students and staff
- Students: 1,683 (2019-2020)
- Teachers: 97.83 (FTE)

Other information
- Website: www.mcusd.org

Mariposa County Unified School District is a public school district in Mariposa County, California, United States. It contains 1 high school, 2 K-8 schools, and 4 elementary schools.

The racial breakdown of students is 66.9% White, 19.5% Hispanic or Latino, 4.1% American Indian or Alaska Native, 0.8% Filipino, 0.7% Asian, 0.5% African American, and 6.4% Multiracial.

== Schools ==
=== High schools ===
- Mariposa County High School

=== K-8 Schools ===
- Mariposa Elementary School
- Woodland Elementary School

=== Elementary schools ===
- Greeley Hill Elementary School & Coulterville High School
- El Portal Elementary School & High School
- Lake Don Pedro Elementary School
- Yosemite Valley Elementary School
