= Mariposa County High School =

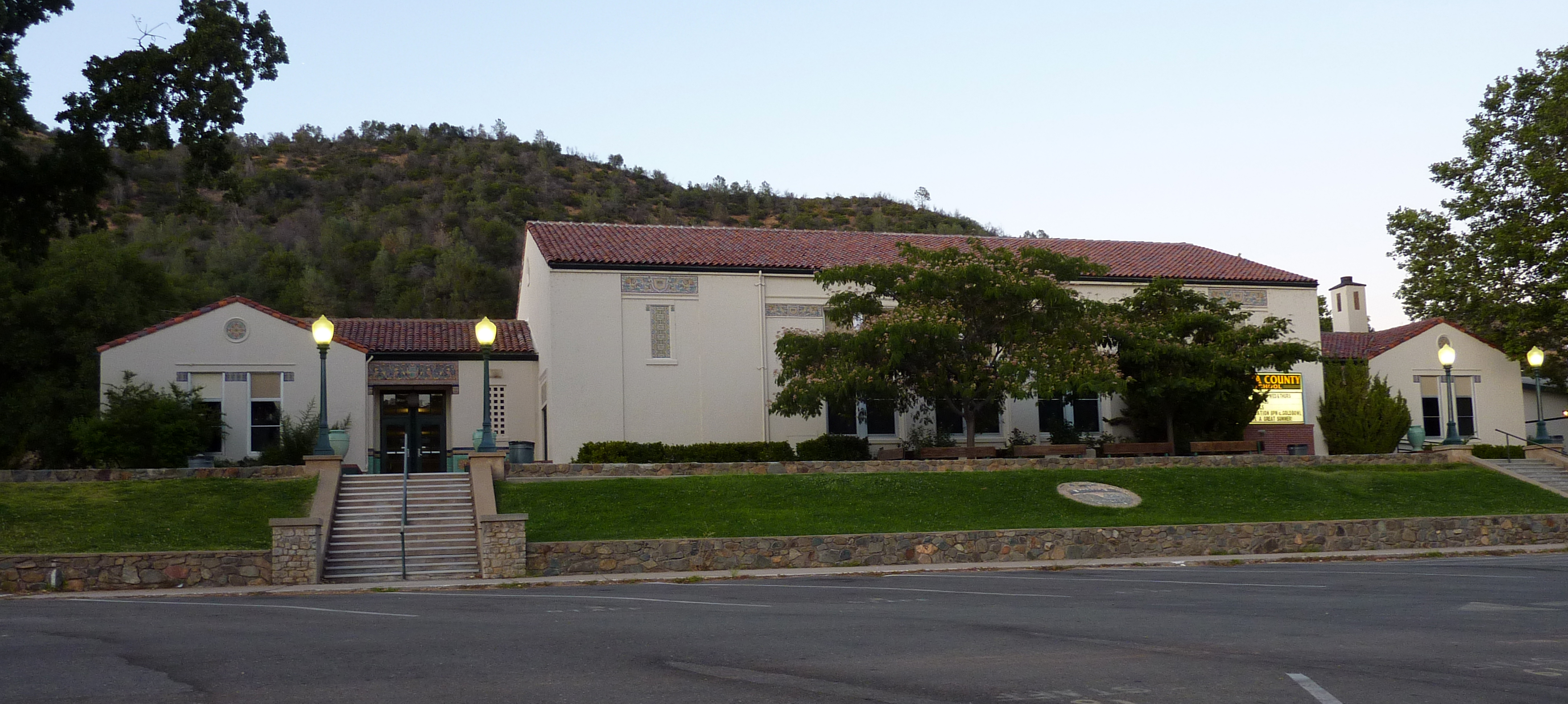

Location
- 5074 Old Hwy N Mariposa, California 95338; United States of America; 37.4888°N 119.9636°W

Information
- School type: Public
- Founded: 1914
- School board: Mariposa County Unified School District
- NCES District ID: 0623940
- NCES School ID: 03602
- Principal: Celeste Azevedo
- Staff: 28.36 (FTE)
- Grades: 9–12
- Enrollment: 457 (2023–2024)
- Student to teacher ratio: 16.11
- Colour: Green Gold
- Athletics conference: CIF Sac-Joaquin Section
- Mascot: Grizzly
- Accreditation: Western Association of Schools and Colleges
- Website: MCHS

Mariposa County High School is a public high school located in Mariposa, California. The school is part of the Mariposa County Unified School District.

== History ==
Founded in 1914, Mariposa County High School was conceived after an election was held to figure out if the county should have a high school. The election was won with the majority of 666 beating those 608 votes against the school.

The school celebrated its 100th birthday in 2014.

== Statistics ==
=== Demographics ===
2016-17 510 students

White	Latino	Asian	African American	American Indian	Two or More Races
69.8%	16.1%	1.2%	0.8%	3.3%	6.5%

=== Standardized Testing ===
SAT Scores for 2014-15
	Average Reading Score	Average Math Score	Average Writing Score
Mariposa High	534	550	513
Statewide	489	500	484

SAT Scores for 2015-16
	Average Reading Score	Average Math Score	Average Writing Score
Mariposa High	493	524	466
Statewide	484	494	477

== Student Activities ==
=== Athletics ===
The school is part of the CIF Sac-Joaquin Section in the Southern League along with seven other schools.

- Boys' Basketball
  - Section Champions
    - 2015-16
- Girls' Basketball
  - Section Champions
    - 1979-80
- Baseball
  - Section Champions
    - 2007-08
    - 2009-10
    - 2011-12
    - 2015-16
- Softball
  - Section Champions
    - 1978-79
    - 1983-84
    - 2011-12
    - 2013-14
    - 2014-15
    - 2015-16
- Football
  - Section Champions
    - 1995-96
    - 2019-20
- Track
- Girls' Track
- Volleyball
  - Section Champions
    - 1980-81
- Boys' Soccer
  - Section Champions
    - 2008-09
- Girls' Soccer
- Golf
  - Section Champions
    - 2015-16
- Tennis
- Wrestling
  - Section Champions
    - 2012-13
    - 2015-16

=== Clubs ===
- Art Club
- Dance Club
- Drama Club
- FFA
- French Club
- Frisbee Club
- Natural Helpers
- Poetry Club
- Rotary Interact Club
- Spanish Club
- Big Chad Esports Team

== Notable alumni ==
- Logan Mankins, former NFL offensive lineman
- George Radanovich, politician
- Cody Wichmann, former NFL offensive lineman
- Russell Wong, actor
- Carolyn Yarnell, composer
