= Mariposa Creek =

Mariposa Creek Mariposa River
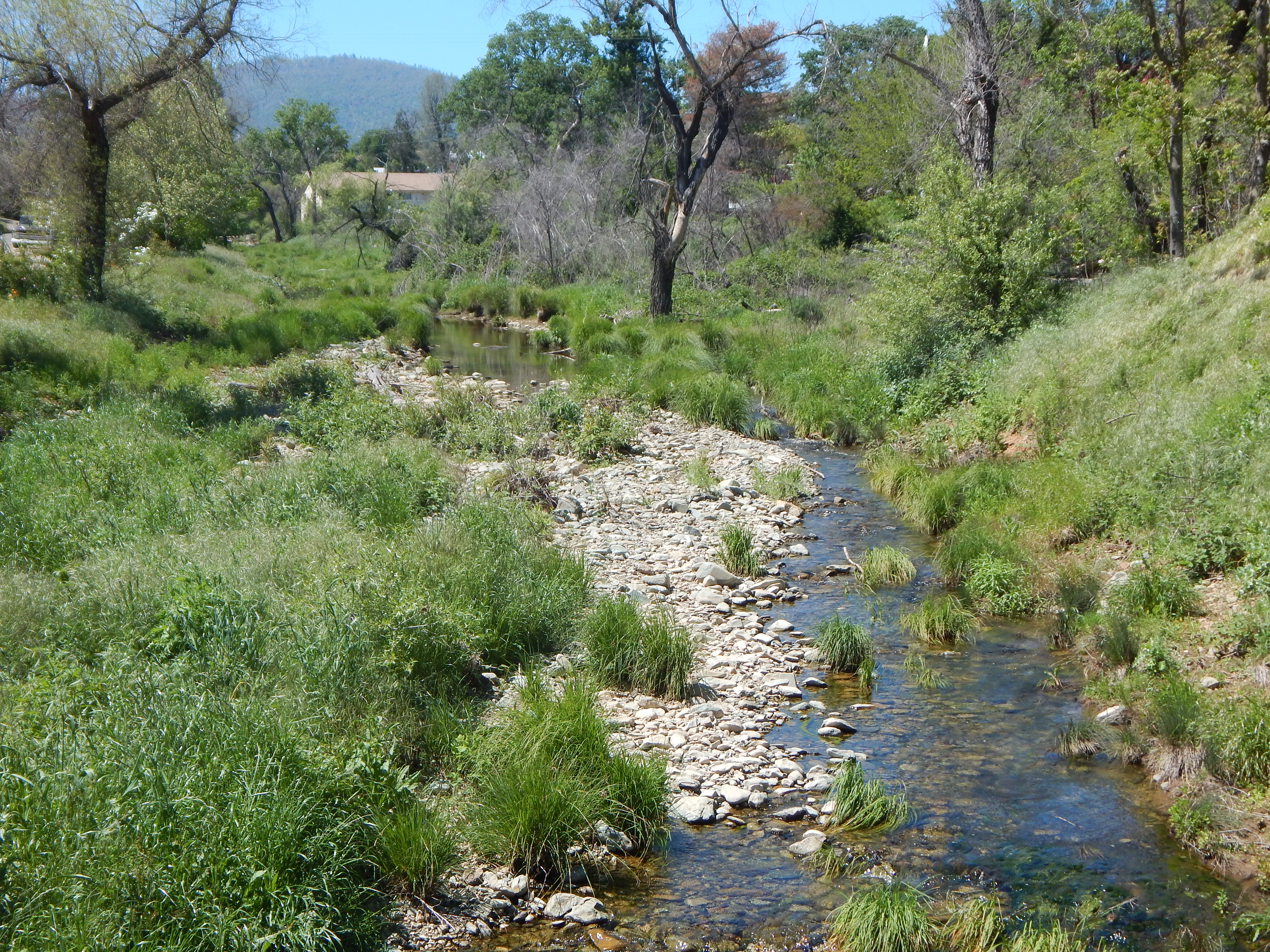
- Mariposa Creek in the town of Mariposa

Location
- Country: United States
- State: California
- Region: Merced County
- Cities: Mariposa, Le Grand

Physical characteristics
- Source
  - location: Western Sierra Nevada foothills
  - coordinates: 37°32′10″N 120°00′40″W
  - elevation: 3,092 ft (942 m)
- Mouth
  - location: Duck Slough
  - coordinates: 37°14′55″N 120°18′34″W
  - elevation: 0 ft (0 m)

Basin features
- Tributaries
  - left: Stockton Creek, Spring Creek, Brushy Canyon Creek, Ganns Creek
  - right: Agua Fria Creek, China Gulch, Bull Run Creek

Mariposa Creek, originally called the Mariposa River, is a creek that has its source in Mariposa County, California. It flows through the town of Mariposa then southwest through the Sierra foothills, into and across the San Joaquin Valley in Merced County, and empties the sloughs of the San Joaquin River south of the city of Merced.

== History ==
Mariposa Creek was named by the Spanish explorer Gabriel Moraga on September 27, 1806, when his expedition discovered a great cluster of butterflies ("mariposas" in Spanish and Portuguese):

"We named this place Mariposas [butterflies] because these abounded, especially at night and during the morning. These butterflies became quite a nuisance. Their eagerness to escape the sun's rays was so pronounced that they pursued us closely everywhere and one of them got inside the ear of one of the privates, causing him great discomfort and us much trouble in extracting it."

Each year on the first weekend in May, Mariposa residents mark the annual arrival of migrating monarch butterflies with a "Butterfly Days" festival and parade.

During the California Gold Rush, the Mariposa River was a rich gold-bearing creek and the site of several mining camps, including Logtown, Mariposa and Mariposita.

== Watershed ==
Mariposa County contains three major drainage basins: the Merced River, Chowchilla River/Fresno River, and a localized cluster of streams of the east valley known as the Lower Mariposa group of streams. These three basins and their component watersheds are part of the much larger San Joaquin River system that drains the western slopes of the Sierra Nevada. At the lower end of the watershed, Mariposa Creek is dammed by the Mariposa Creek Dam (88 feet (27 m) high). The Mariposa Public Utilities District (MPUD) operates the Stockton Creek Dam (95 feet (29 m) tall) on Stockton Creek, a tributary of Mariposa Creek.

== Mariposa Creek Parkway ==
Mariposa County maintains a park along the creek in downtown Mariposa. It features an Art Park with an amphitheatre, and a demonstration garden of California native plants sponsored by the local chapter of the Master Gardeners.

== Images ==
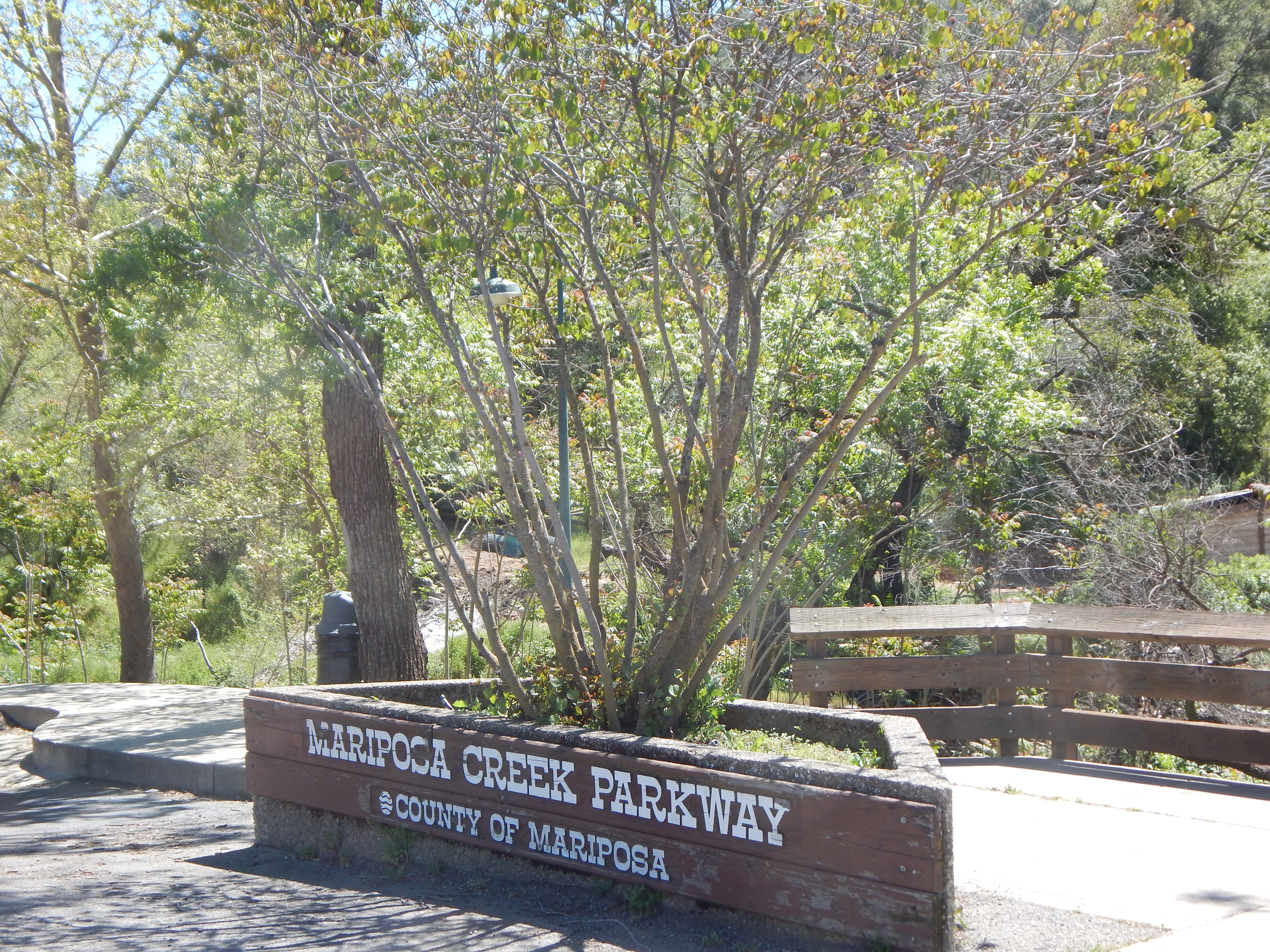
Mariposa Creek Parkway

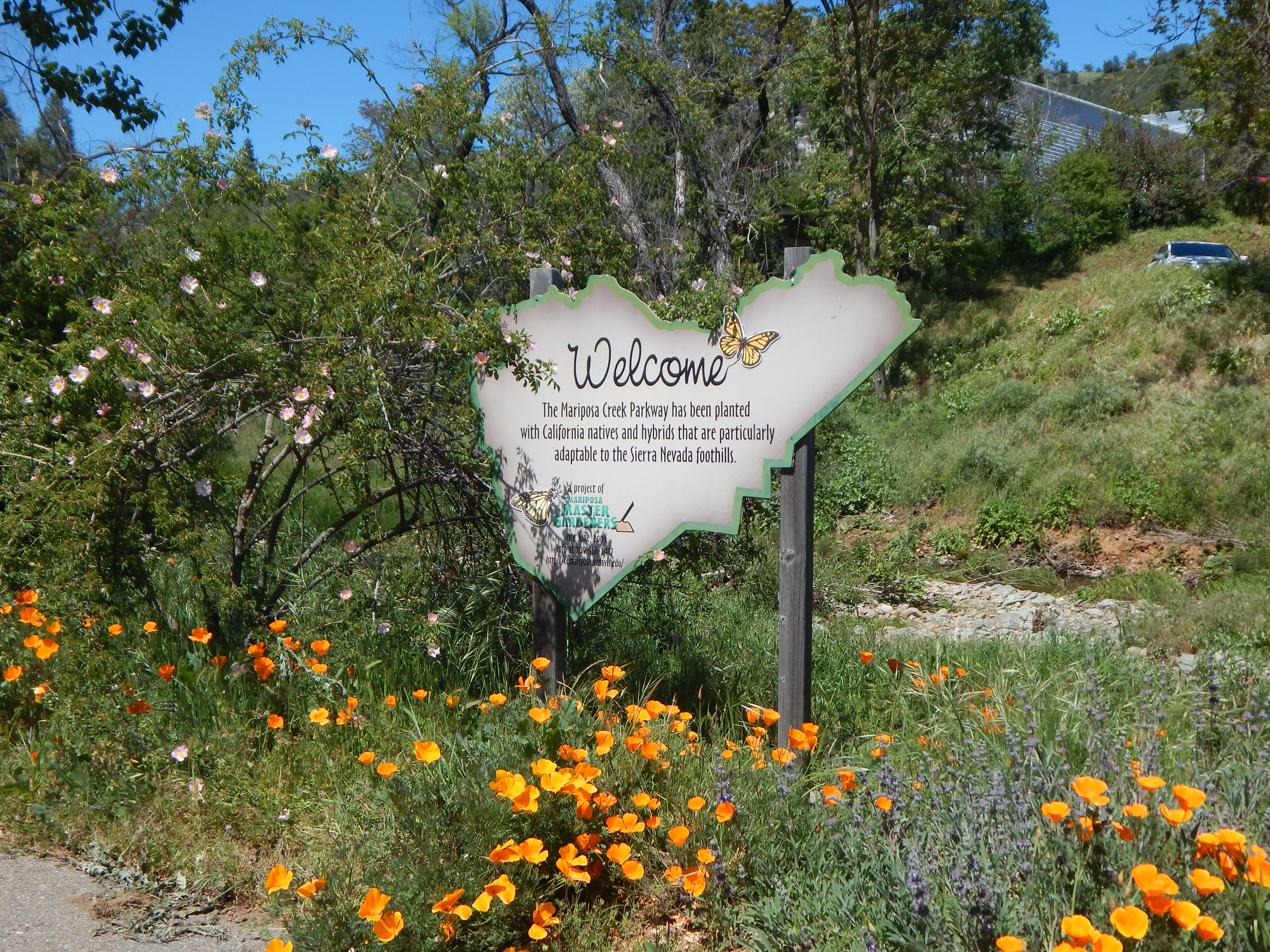
Mariposa Creek Parkway, Demonstration Garden

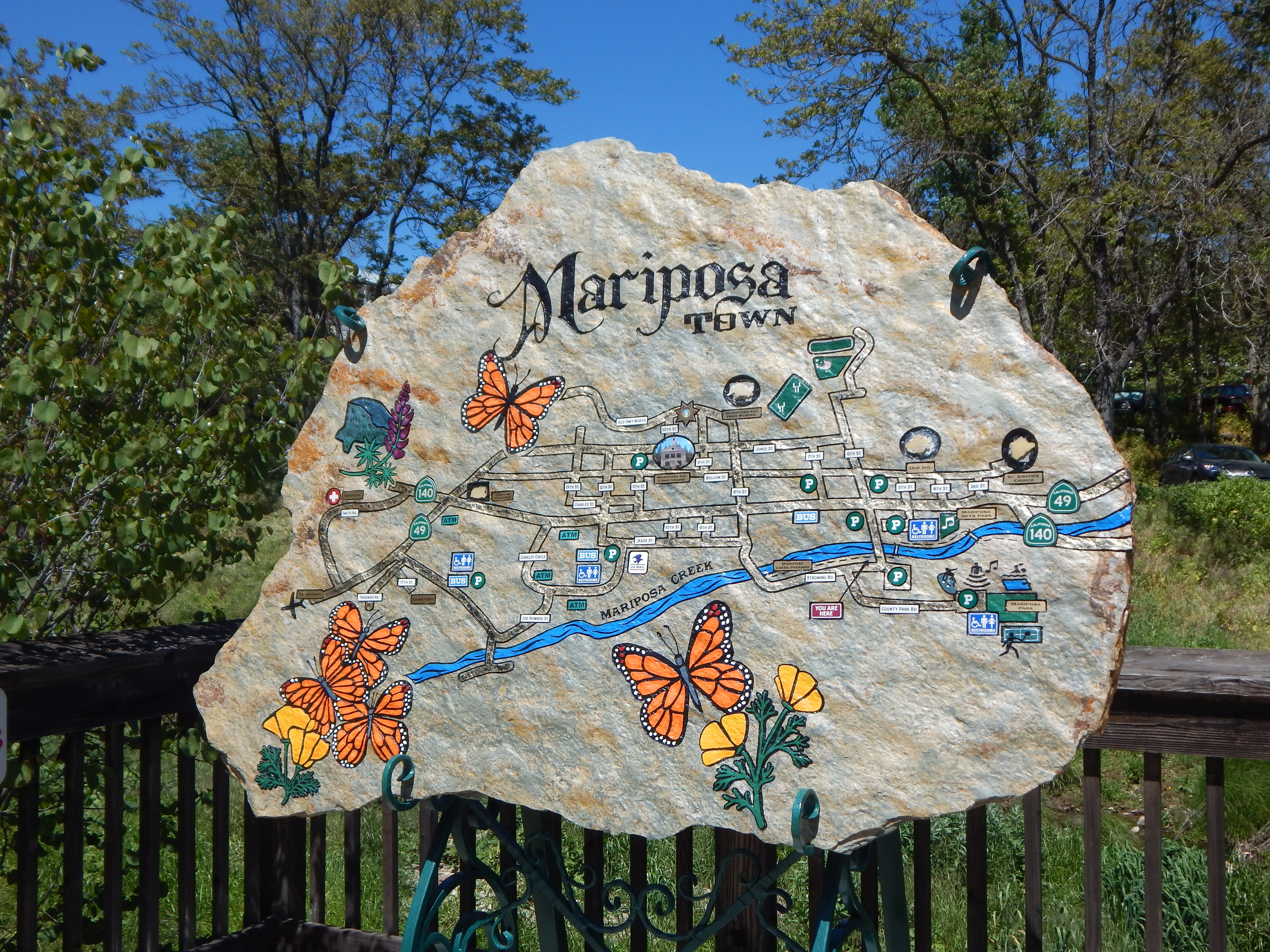
Mariposa Creek Parkway, combined stone art and map
