= Stockton Creek =

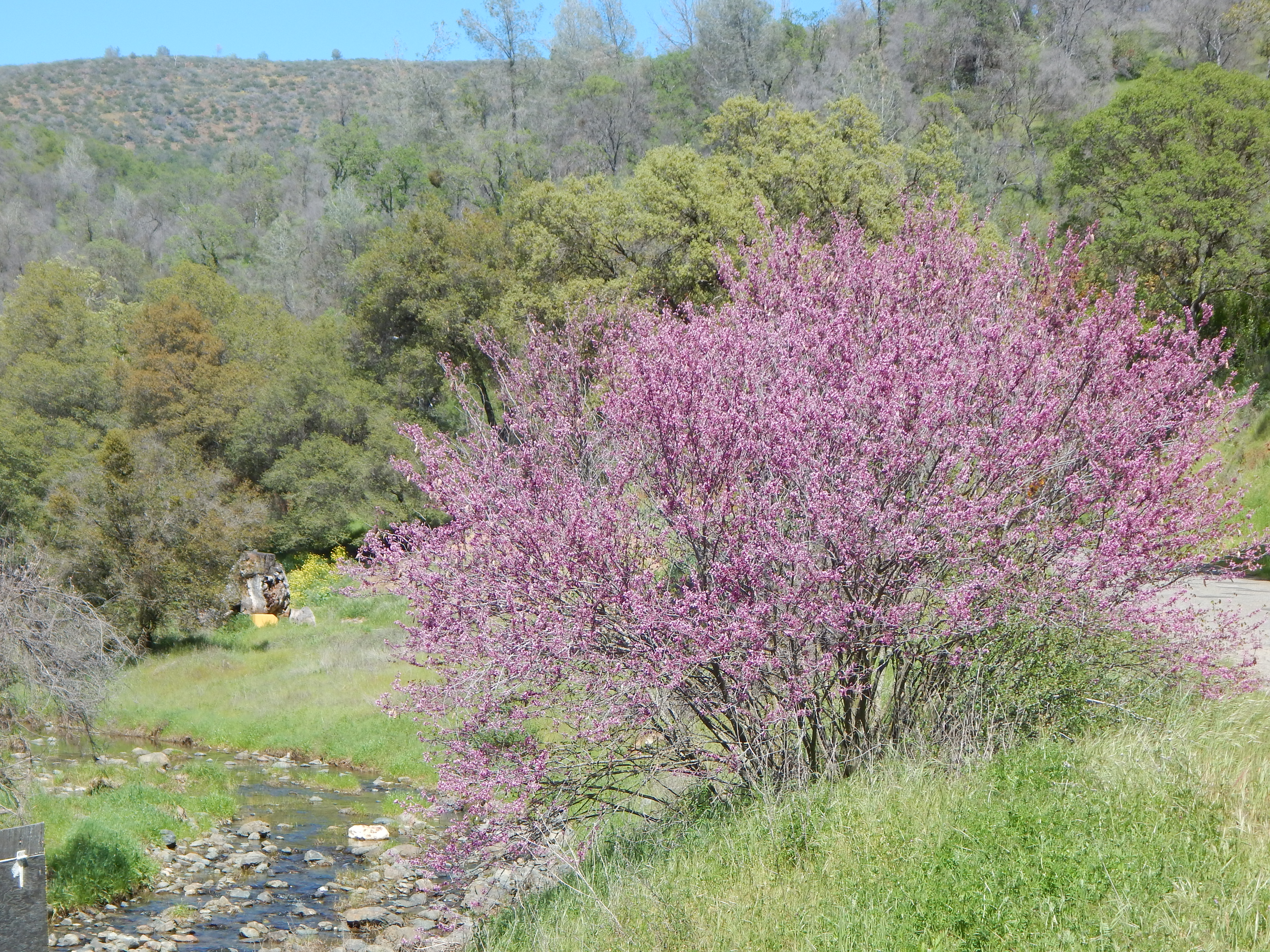
- Stockton Creek near its mouth

- Location within California

Physical characteristics
- Source
  - location: Western Sierra Nevada Foothills
  - coordinates: 37.5066°N 119.9302°W
- Mouth: Mariposa Creek
  - location: Mormon Bar
  - coordinates: 37.4685°N 119.9513°W
  - elevation: 1,827 feet (557 m)

Basin features
- River system: San Joaquin River

Stockton Creek is a tributary of Mariposa Creek in Mariposa County, California. It was named after Robert F. Stockton who owned a mine and stamp mill during the California Gold Rush. An impoundment on the creek owned by the Mariposa Public Utilities Commission holds a major source of water for the community of Mariposa.

The source of the creek is near Midpines Summit. Its confluence with Mariposa Creek is near the Mariposa County Fairgrounds.

== History ==
In 1850, Commodore Stockton invested in a mine and leased land from his former subordinate during the Mexican War, John Fremont. Fremont had acquired all of the surrounding area as part of the Las Mariposas Land Grant. Stockton formed a partnership with William Aspinwall and in April 1850 they hired Edward Beale to supervise the transport of a steam-powered rock crushing apparatus to be installed at their mine on the creek. After successfully supervising the installation of the stamp mill Beale returned to the east coast, but then was reassigned by Stockton and Aspinwall to go back to California to inspect the mine's viability, which he found to be not profitable. However it was on this trip that Beale assessed the need to build a railroad across the Isthmus of Panama, which became a major operation for Aspinwall.

Aspinwall and Stockton sold their interests in the Stockton Creek Mine and the associated Stockton Creek Tunnel. The mine operated sporadically until 1938. Its principal period of productivity was from 1900 to 1915.

The mouth of Stockton Creek was, and still is, an area of general commercial development. Known as Mormon Bar, there were hard rock mines, placer claims, and a stockyard during the gold rush. A sand and gravel company operated at Mormon bar in the mid 20th century, using mostly dredge tailings as a material source. The Mariposa County Fairgrounds are located at Mormon Bar.

== Watershed ==
Mariposa County contains three major drainage basins: the Merced River, Chowchilla River/Fresno River, and a localized cluster of streams of the east valley known as the Lower Mariposa group of streams. These three basins and their component watersheds are part of the much larger San Joaquin River system that drains the western slopes of the Sierra Nevada. At the lower end of the watershed, Mariposa Creek is dammed by the Mariposa Creek Dam (88 feet (27 m) high). The Mariposa Public Utilities District (MPUD) operates the Stockton Creek Dam (95 feet (29 m) tall) on Stockton Creek.

== Stockton Creek Preserve ==
In 2011 areas around the reservoir were set aside for public use in a joint project of the Sierra Foothill Conservancy and the Mariposa Public Utilities District known as the Stockton Creek Preserve. Stockton Creek Reservoir provides water to Mariposa, and the preserve was set aside in order to better protect the natural surroundings for watershed protection, and also for public enjoyment of the area. The preserve is 410 acres, and is accessible via trail easements across private property.

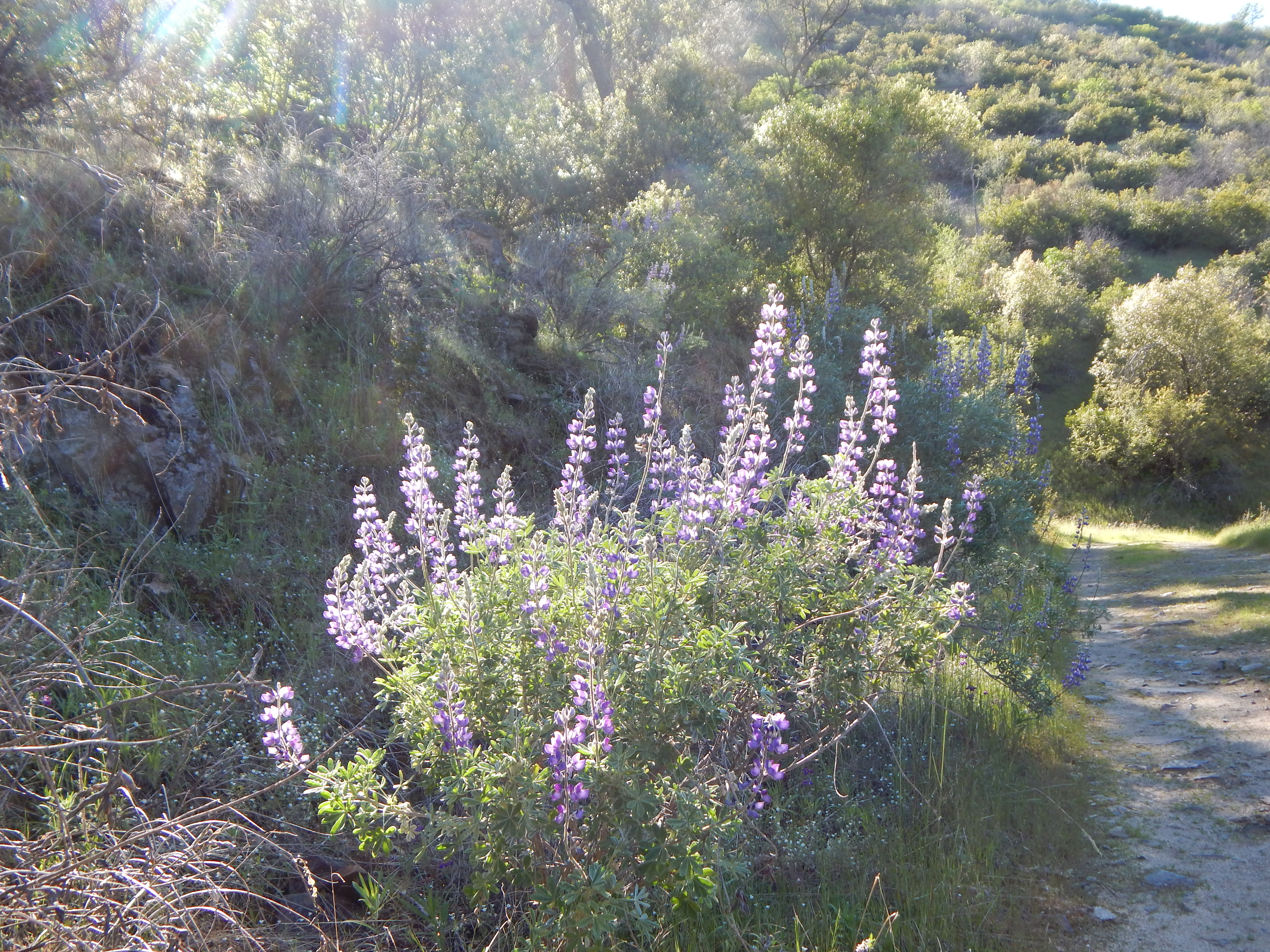
On Stockton Creek Preserve trail, Mariposa, CA

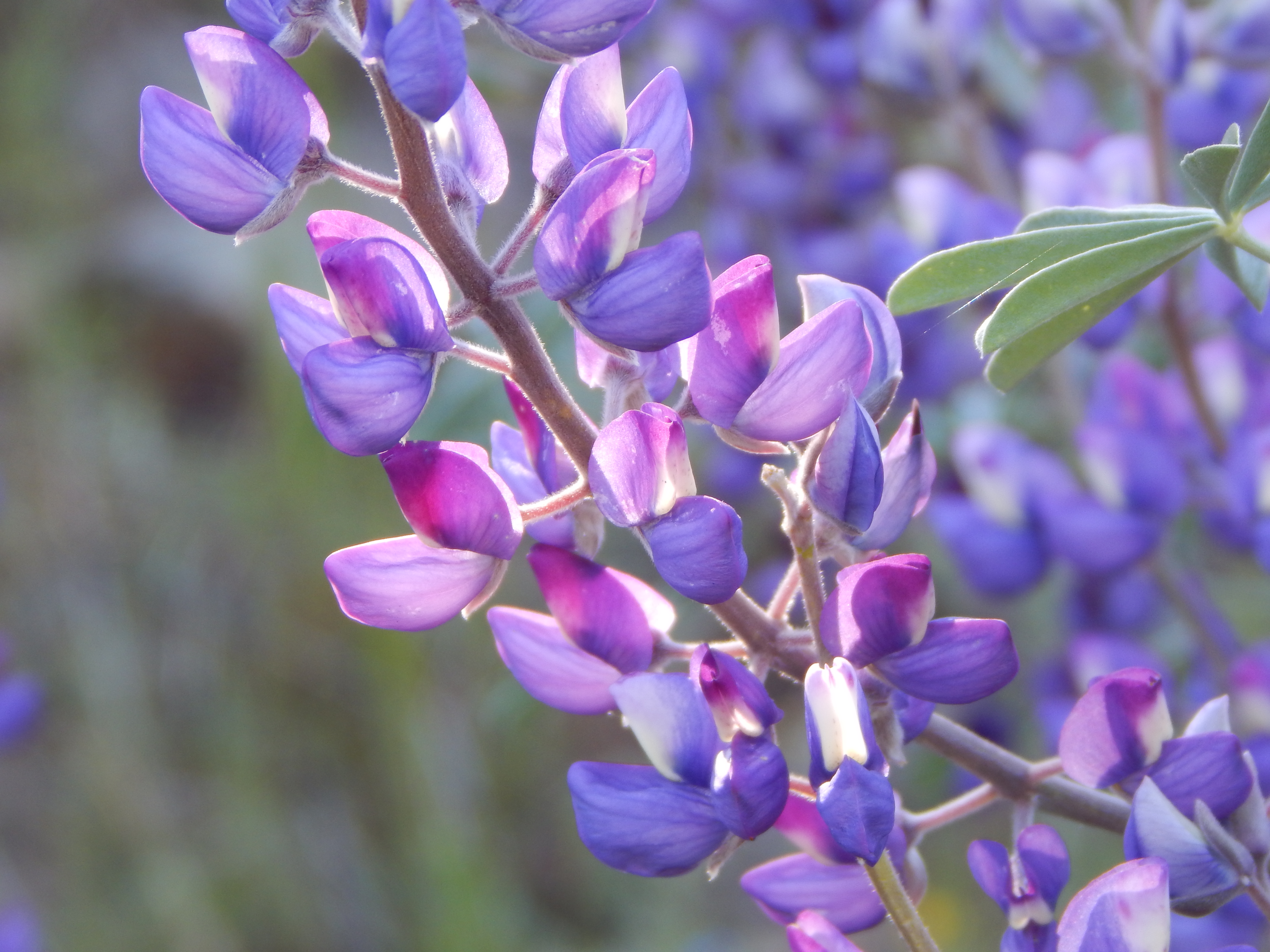
Wildflower close up, Stockton Creek Preserve trail, Mariposa, CA

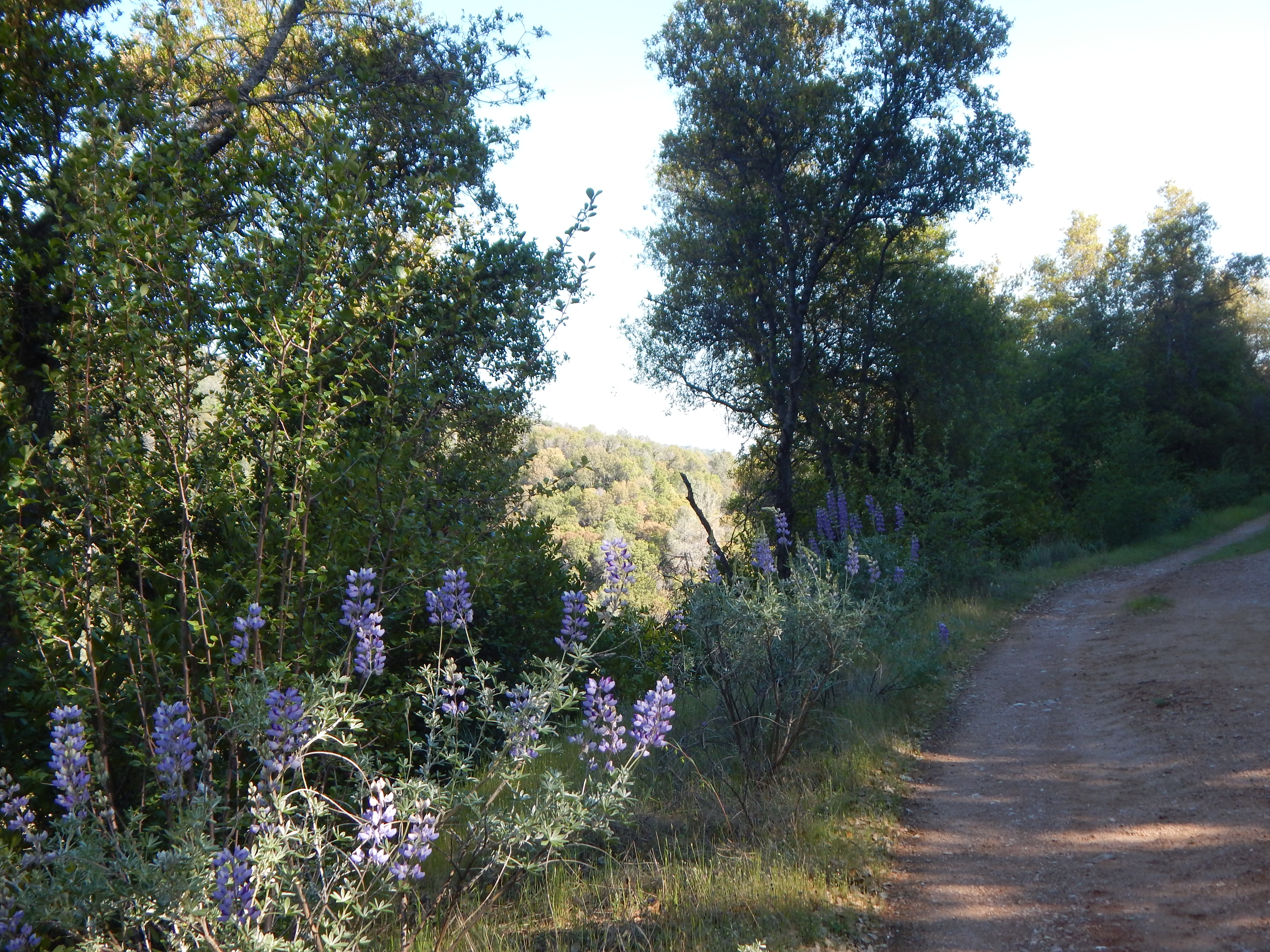
View from the Stockton Creek Preserve trail, Mariposa, CA
