= St. Joseph Catholic Church, Rectory and Cemetery =

Church and cemetery in Mariposa County, California, US

- U.S. National Register of Historic Places
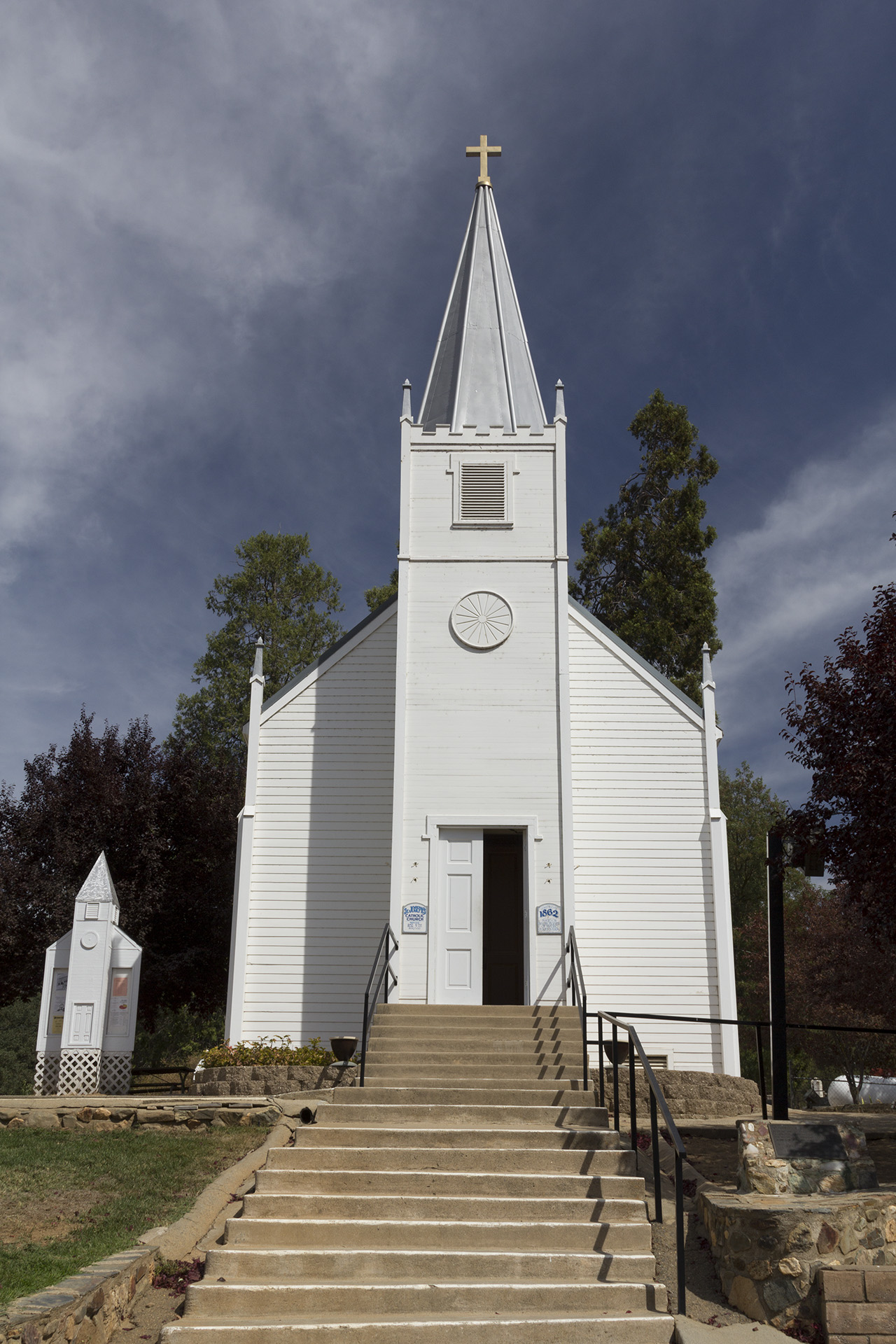

- Location within California Location within the United States
- Location: 4983–4985 Bullion St., Mariposa, California
- Coordinates: 37°28′58″N 119°57′41″W
- Area: 3.1 acres (1.3 ha)
- Built: 1927
- Architectural style: Carpenter Gothic, Bungalow/Craftsman
- NRHP reference No.: 91000424
- Added to NRHP: April 16, 1991

St. Joseph Catholic Church, Rectory and Cemetery is a historic church, rectory, and cemetery located at 4983–4985 Bullion Street in the city of Mariposa, in the Sierra foothills of Mariposa County, California.

== History ==
The church was completed in 1863. It was designed in the Carpenter Gothic style, a type of Gothic Revival architecture style that was popular for wooden churches in the United States.

The St. Joseph Catholic Church, Rectory and Cemetery was added to the National Register of Historic Places in 1991.

== See also ==
- National Register of Historic Places listings in Mariposa County, California
