= Robert F. Stockton =

United States Navy officer (1795–1866)

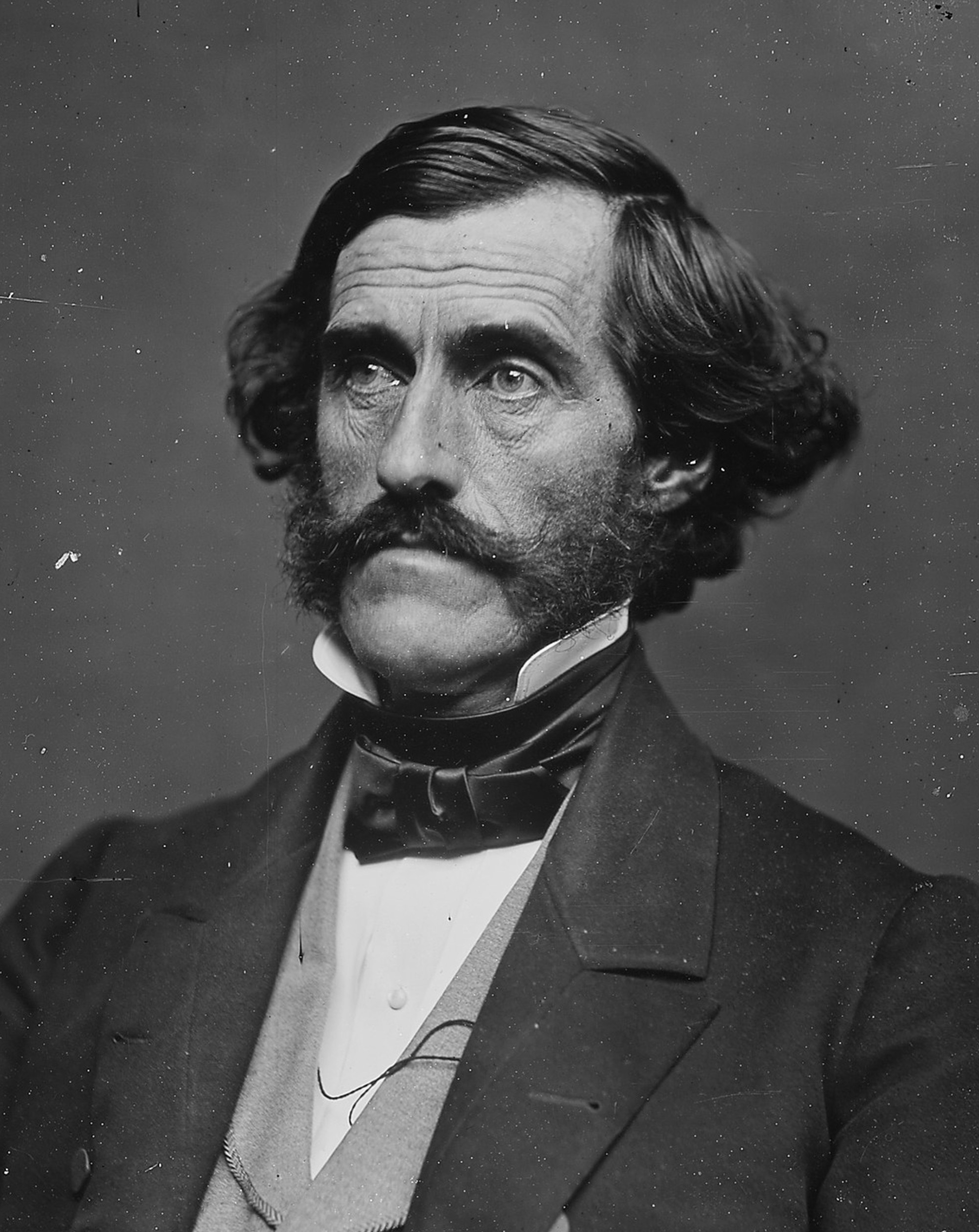
- Portrait by Mathew Brady c. 1860–1865

United States Senator from New Jersey
- In office March 4, 1851 – January 10, 1853
- Preceded by: William L. Dayton
- Succeeded by: John Renshaw Thomson

2nd Military Governor of California
- In office July 29, 1846 – January 16, 1847
- Preceded by: Andrés Pico (as acting Governor of Alta California); John D. Sloat
- Succeeded by: Stephen W. Kearny

Personal details
- Born: Robert Field Stockton; August 20, 1795 Princeton, New Jersey, U.S.
- Died: October 7, 1866 (aged 71) Princeton, New Jersey, U.S.
- Resting place: Princeton Cemetery
- Party: Democratic
- Spouse: Harriet Maria Potter (m. 1823)
- Children: 10 including John P. Stockton
- Parent: Richard Stockton
- Awards: See: § Awards and legacy

Military service
- Allegiance: United States
- Branch/service: United States Navy
- Years of service: 1811–1850
- Rank: Commodore
- Commands: Princeton; Congress; Pacific Squadron; New Jersey militia
- Battles/wars: War of 1812; Mexican–American War; Conquest of California; Battle of San Pasqual; Battle of Río San Gabriel; Battle of La Mesa
- Coat of arms

Robert Field Stockton (August 20, 1795 – October 7, 1866) was a United States Navy commodore, notable in the capture of California during the Mexican–American War. He was a naval innovator and an early advocate for a propeller-driven, steam-powered navy. Stockton was from a notable political family and also served as a U.S. senator from New Jersey.

== Biography ==
Robert F. Stockton was born at Morven, on Stockton Street in Princeton, New Jersey, into a political family; his father Richard Stockton was a U.S. senator and representative, and his grandfather, Judge Richard Stockton, was attorney general for New Jersey and a signer of the Declaration of Independence. Robert F. Stockton was of English descent, and his family had been in what is now the United States since the early colonial period. On March 4, 1823, he married Harriet Maria Potter in Charleston, South Carolina. Ten children were born from this marriage.

=== Early naval service ===
Stockton was appointed a midshipman in the U.S. Navy in September 1811, shortly after his 16th birthday, and served at sea and ashore during the War of 1812. After that conflict, Lieutenant Stockton was assigned to ships operating in the Mediterranean, in the Caribbean and off the coast of West Africa. He was the first naval officer to act against the slave trade and captured several slave ships. In December 1821, while commanding USS Alligator along the African Windward Coast, Lt. Stockton, along with Dr. Eli Ayers of the American Colonization Society, negotiated a treaty that led to the founding of the state of Liberia. One source said that Stockton "leveled a pistol at King Peter's head and thereby convinced the latter to sell some of his territory". Another source states that, before Stockton leveled his pistol at King Peter, he handed another pistol to Ayers, directing him to shoot a mixed race slave trader who was warning King Peter that the Americans sought to end the slave trade from which King Peter's tribe profited.

=== Business affairs ===
During the later 1820s and into the 1830s, Stockton primarily devoted his attention to business affairs in New Jersey. In addition, Stockton owned and operated the Tellurium gold mine in Goochland and Fluvanna counties in Virginia. He had purchased it in 1848, after its discovery in 1832. His son John P. Stockton was born during this period. He later followed his father into politics and was elected as a U.S. senator representing New Jersey.

In 1835, Stockton purchased a property in Monmouth County, New Jersey, called "Sea Girt". The property was purchased in 1875 by a group of land developers, with the name of Stockton's estate ultimately leading to the choice of the name Sea Girt, New Jersey, when the borough was established in 1918.

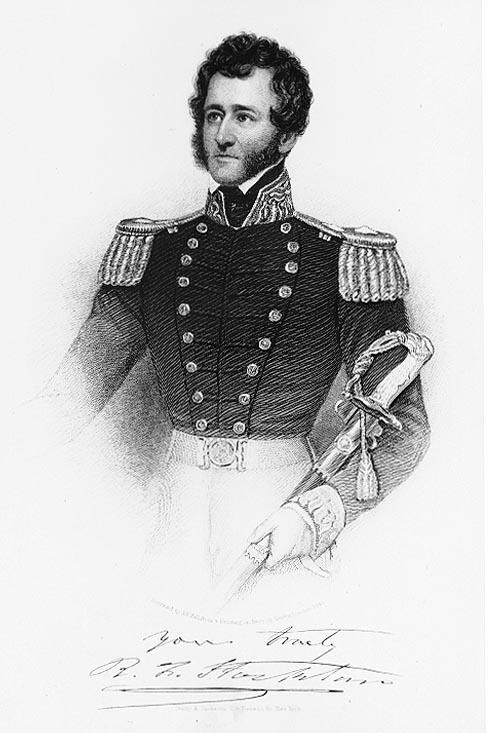
Commodore Robert F. Stockton

=== Resumes active naval service ===
In 1838, Stockton resumed active naval service as a captain. He served in the European area but took leave in 1840 to undertake political work. Offered the post of U.S. Secretary of the Navy by President John Tyler in 1841, he declined the offer but worked successfully to gain support for the construction of an advanced steam warship with a battery of very heavy guns.

This ship became USS Princeton, the Navy's first screw-propelled steamer. The ship was designed by John Ericsson. Stockton commanded her when she was completed in 1843. The ship was armed with two long 225-pounder wrought iron guns, called the "Peacemaker" and the "Oregon". Although he was the deviser of the defective gun, Captain Stockton's political influence allowed him to be absolved of all responsibility for the February 1844 explosion of the gun, the Peacemaker, on board the ship. The explosion killed two cabinet secretaries and several others.

Cleared by the court of any wrongdoing in the explosion incident, Stockton was sent by President James K. Polk to Texas. Stockton carried with him Polk's offer to annex Texas, sailing on the Princeton and arriving in Galveston. Stockton's observations while in Texas made him aware of the looming war with Mexico, a fact he communicated directly to Polk once he arrived back in Washington. No vessel during the Mexican war was more useful than the Princeton in the Gulf of Mexico. The records of the Navy Department showed she performed more service than all the rest of the Gulf squadron put together.

=== Mexican–American War ===
Conquest of California

On July 23, 1846, Commodore Stockton arrived in Monterey, California, and took over command from the ailing Commodore John D. Sloat of the Pacific Squadron of U.S. naval forces in the Pacific Ocean. Commodore Sloat had previously raised the US flag, without resistance, at Monterey, but had no plan to conduct any further military operations on shore and once relieved, sailed home to the United States, leaving Commodore Stockton in command of all US forces. Stockton's command ship was USS Congress and his combined fleet of three frigates with about 480 men each, one ship of the line with about 780 men and up to four sloops with about 200 men each as well as three storeships made him the strongest force in California as well as the senior military commander and military governor. He was the main driving force in continuing to take possession of Alta California.

On August 11, 1846, Commodore Stockton marched on Pueblo de Los Angeles to meet in battle with General Castro's army. Upon learning of the imminent arrival of Commodore Stockton, Castro retired, leaving behind all his artillery and made off in the direction of Sonora. Immediately after these events Stockton dispatched a courier, Kit Carson, to inform Washington of the proceedings and details of his conquest of California.

On December 6, 1846, Stockton learned that General Stephen Kearny had arrived in California with a small force and that he was besieged by vastly superior enemy forces at the Battle of San Pasqual. Kearny was among the wounded and in command of only 60 weary dragoons mounted on tired mules who were in a perilous position and under attack from a Californio-Mexican cavalry force under Andrés Pico. But for Commodore Stockton's immediate decision to take personal command of a relief column, the outcome could have been disastrous for Kearny.

Later, the combined forces consolidated control over San Diego, and in January 1847 won the minor skirmishes at the Battle of Rio San Gabriel and Battle of La Mesa taking back control of Los Angeles. Faced with the approximate 200 men under John C. Fremont's California Battalion as well as Stockton and Kearny's troops, the Californios sued for peace and signed the Treaty of Cahuenga, which ending fighting in Alta California. Stockton, as senior military authority and military governor of the occupied territory, authorized John C. Fremont's appointment to succeed him as military governor and commander of the California Battalion militia force. When General Kearny finally arrived with orders to assume control of the temporary government Stockton turned over control to Kearny.

=== Political pursuits ===
Stockton resigned from the Navy in May 1850 and returned to business and political pursuits. In 1851, he was elected as a Democrat from New Jersey to the United States Senate, where he sponsored a bill to abolish flogging as a Navy punishment. He resigned on January 10, 1853, to serve as president of the Delaware and Raritan Canal Company, a position he held until 1866.

He was a delegate to the unsuccessful Peace Conference of 1861 that attempted to settle the secession crisis; instead the American Civil War began later that year. In 1863, he was appointed to command the New Jersey militia when the Confederate Army invaded Pennsylvania. Stockton died at Princeton, New Jersey, in October 1866, and is buried in the Princeton Cemetery.

== Legacy ==
Four U.S. Navy ships have been named USS Stockton in his honor. The cities of Stockton, California, and Stockton, Missouri, are named in his honor, as is the borough of Stockton, New Jersey, Stockton Street in San Francisco, and Fort Stockton, San Diego, California, which is now a ruin, but was occupied during the Mexican–American War. In Mariposa County, California Stockton Creek is named after him due to a mine he owned in the California Gold Rush. In Liberia, Stockton Creek, a tidal channel that connects the Mesurado River and the Saint Paul River, and that separates Bushrod Island from the mainland in Monrovia, is also named for him.

Formerly Commodore Stockton Elementary School in San Francisco between Clay and Pacific Streets was named after him. Stockton Street in San Jose was named after him and his Garden Alameda San Jose neighborhood. In Sacramento, Stockton Boulevard is the historic thoroughfare linking Sacramento and Stockton, now superseded by Highway 99 and Interstate 5.

- Fort Stockton California Historical Landmark No. 54.

== Bibliography ==
- United States Congress. "Robert F. Stockton (id: S000942)". Biographical Directory of the United States Congress.
- Brockmann, R. John, (2009) Commodore Robert F. Stockton, 1795-1866: Protean Man for a Protean Nation Cambria Press, Amherst, Massachusetts, p. 622. The only scholarly biography. ISBN 978-1-60497-630-4 Url
- Beach, Edward Latimer. The United States Navy: A 200-year History. Houghton Mifflin Company. C 1986. pp. 196–221.

U.S. Senate
Preceded by William L. Dayton	U.S. senator (Class 1) from New Jersey; 1851–1853; Served alongside: Jacob W. Miller	Succeeded by John R. Thomson
