= Cody Wichmann =

American football player (born 1992)

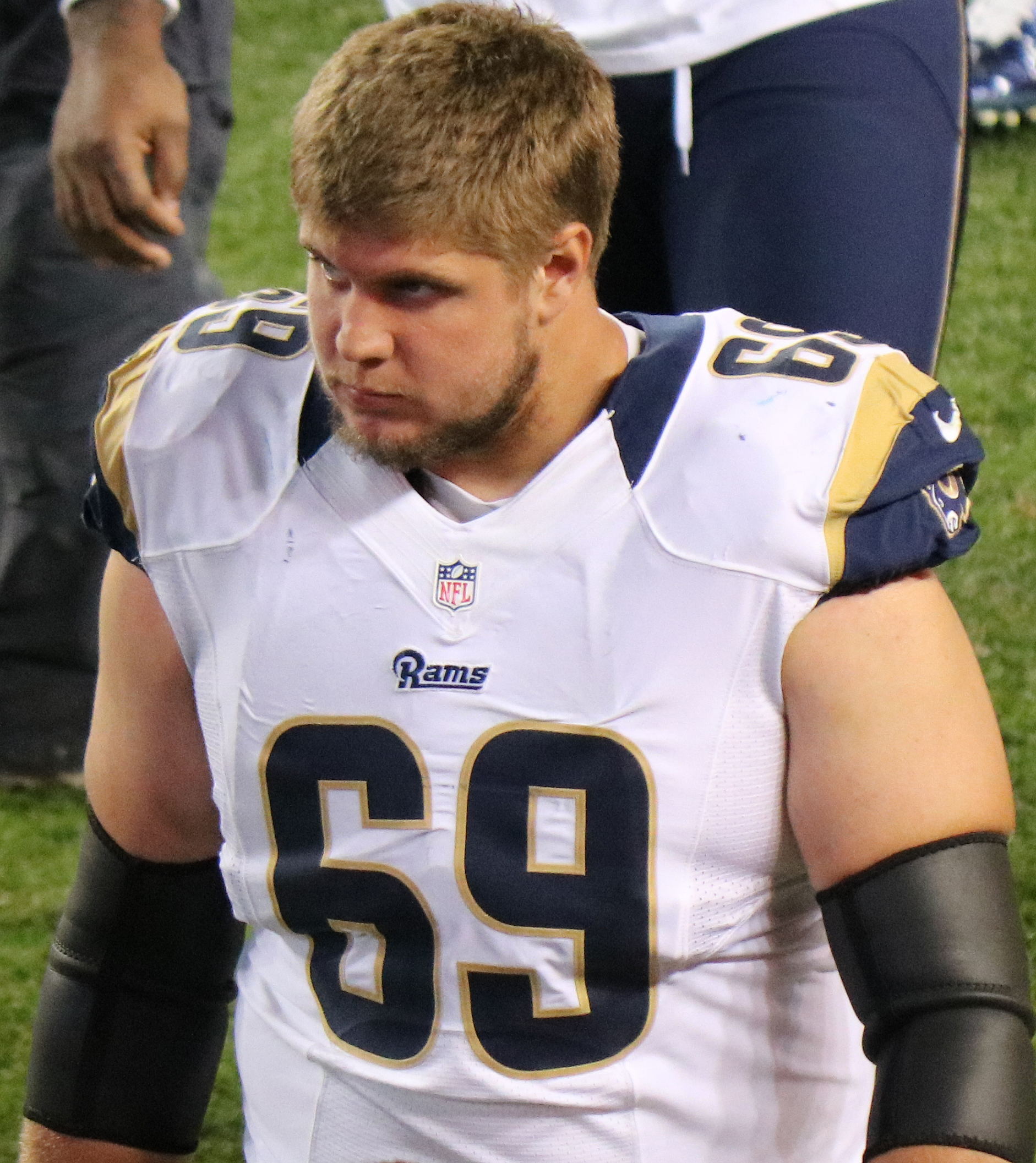
- Wichmann with the Los Angeles Rams in 2016

No. 69, 78
- Position: Offensive guard

Personal information
- Born: March 2, 1992 (age 34); Tucson, Arizona, U.S.
- Listed height: 6 ft 5 in (1.96 m)
- Listed weight: 319 lb (145 kg)

Career information
- High school: Mariposa County (Mariposa, California)
- College: Fresno State (2010–2014)
- NFL draft: 2015: 6th round, 215th overall pick

Career history
- St. Louis / Los Angeles Rams (2015–2016); Tennessee Titans (2017–2018)*; Dallas Cowboys (2018–2019)
- * Offseason or practice squad member only

Awards and highlights
- Second-team All-MWC (2014)

Career NFL statistics
- Games played: 24
- Games started: 18
- Stats at Pro Football Reference

Cody Michael Wichmann (born March 2, 1992) is an American former professional football player who was an offensive guard in the National Football League (NFL). He played college football for the Fresno State Bulldogs.

== College career ==
Wichmann started in 50 career games at Fresno State, the second most starts by any Bulldog in the eight years. A two-time All-Mountain West Conference selection, he garnered second-team accolades as a senior in 2014 and honorable mention in 2013. He majored in criminology-law enforcement at Fresno State.

== Professional career ==
=== St. Louis / Los Angeles Rams ===
Wichmann was selected by the St. Louis Rams in the sixth round (215th overall) of the 2015 NFL draft. He played in 12 games with 7 starts as a rookie. In 2016, he played in 12 games with 11 starts at guard for the Rams.

On September 2, 2017, Wichmann was waived by the Rams.

=== Tennessee Titans ===
On September 12, 2017, Wichmann was signed to the practice squad of the Tennessee Titans. He signed a reserve/future contract with the Titans on January 15, 2018. On September 1, Wichmann was waived by the Titans.

=== Dallas Cowboys ===
On September 4, 2018, Wichmann was signed to the Dallas Cowboys' practice squad. He signed a reserve/future contract with the Cowboys on January 15, 2019. He was placed on the injured reserve list with a calf injury on August 31.

On September 4, 2020, Wichmann was released by the Cowboys.
