= USS Stockton =

Three ships in the United States Navy have been named USS Stockton for Commodore Robert F. Stockton.

- USS Stockton (TB-32) was a torpedo boat, commissioned in 1901 and decommissioned in 1913.
- USS Stockton (DD-73) was a Caldwell-class destroyer commissioned in 1917, served in World War I, decommissioned in 1922, and transferred to the Royal Navy as HMS Ludlow in 1940.
- USS Stockton (DD-504), a planned Stevenson-class light destroyer canceled in 1941
- USS Stockton (DD-646) was a Gleaves-class destroyer, commissioned in 1943, served in World War II, and decommissioned in 1946
