= Detwiler Fire =

2017 wildfire in Central California

- Part of the 2017 California wildfires
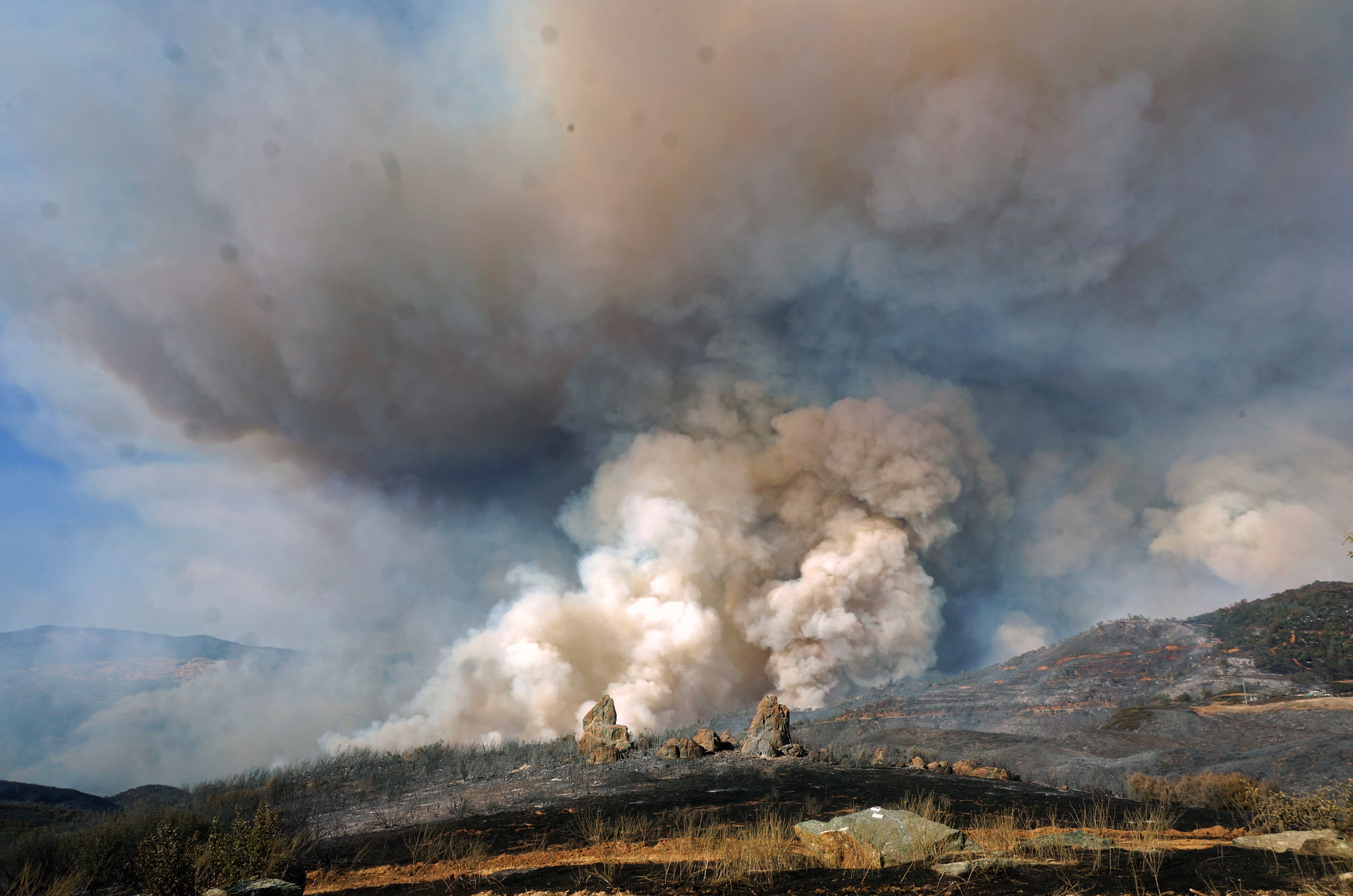
- Date: July 16, 2017 –; August 24, 2017
- Location: Lake McClure, Mariposa County, California
- Coordinates: 37°37′03″N 120°12′48″W

Statistics
- Burned area: 81,826 acres (331 km^{2})

Impacts
- Evacuated: ~4,000
- Structures lost: 131 structures (63 homes), 21 damaged

Ignition
- Cause: Firearm Discharge (Under further investigation)

Map
- Location in California

The Detwiler Fire was a wildfire that burned across Highway 49, east and south of Lake McClure, in Mariposa County, California. Ignited shortly before 4 p.m. on Sunday, July 16, 2017, the fire consumed up to 2,500 acres (1,000 ha) within its first day of burning. By Thursday morning, on July 20, the fire was over 70,000 acres (28,000 ha) in size with only 7 percent containment.

== Progression ==
First reported at 3:56 p.m., the Detwiler fire was reported burning near Detwiler Road and Hunters Valley Road, 2 miles east of Lake McClure. Within three hours, it had grown to over 1,000 acres as it spread primarily to the northeast. Mandatory evacuations were ordered for all homes along Detwiler Road, Hunters Valley Road, and Hunters Valley Access Road. A Red Cross Evacuation Shelter was set up at McCay Hall, in Catheys Valley. By nightfall, the fire was 2,500 acres in size with zero percent containment.

On the morning of Monday, July 17, the fire reached a reported 7,100 acres (2,900 ha) with still zero percent containment, as intense heat, windy conditions, and limited resources hampered suppression efforts. Severe fire actively further lead to the evacuation of the Bear Valley area, south of the fire. Highway 49 was also closed due to the fire.

A state of emergency was declared on Tuesday, July 18, 2017, as the fire exploded to over 25,000 acres (100 km^{2}) within the day. The entire community of Mariposa was put under a mandatory evacuation order as over 5,000 structures were threatened. Yosemite National Park remained open, however some access roads were closed and the fire caused smoky conditions throughout the park.

By the morning of Friday, July 21, the fire had been reported at 74,083 acres at 15% containment. 118 structures had been reported destroyed, with 58 of those being homes. As of 11:00 AM that day, the evacuation of Mariposa was lifted.

Over the weekend of July 22 and 23, further evacuation orders were lifted for the surrounding affected areas and by July 24, the fire had burned 76,500 acres and was estimated at 50% containment. Within the following days, fire crews had made significant headway, and by Wednesday, July 26, the fire was at 80,250 acres as containment had grown to 65% containment.

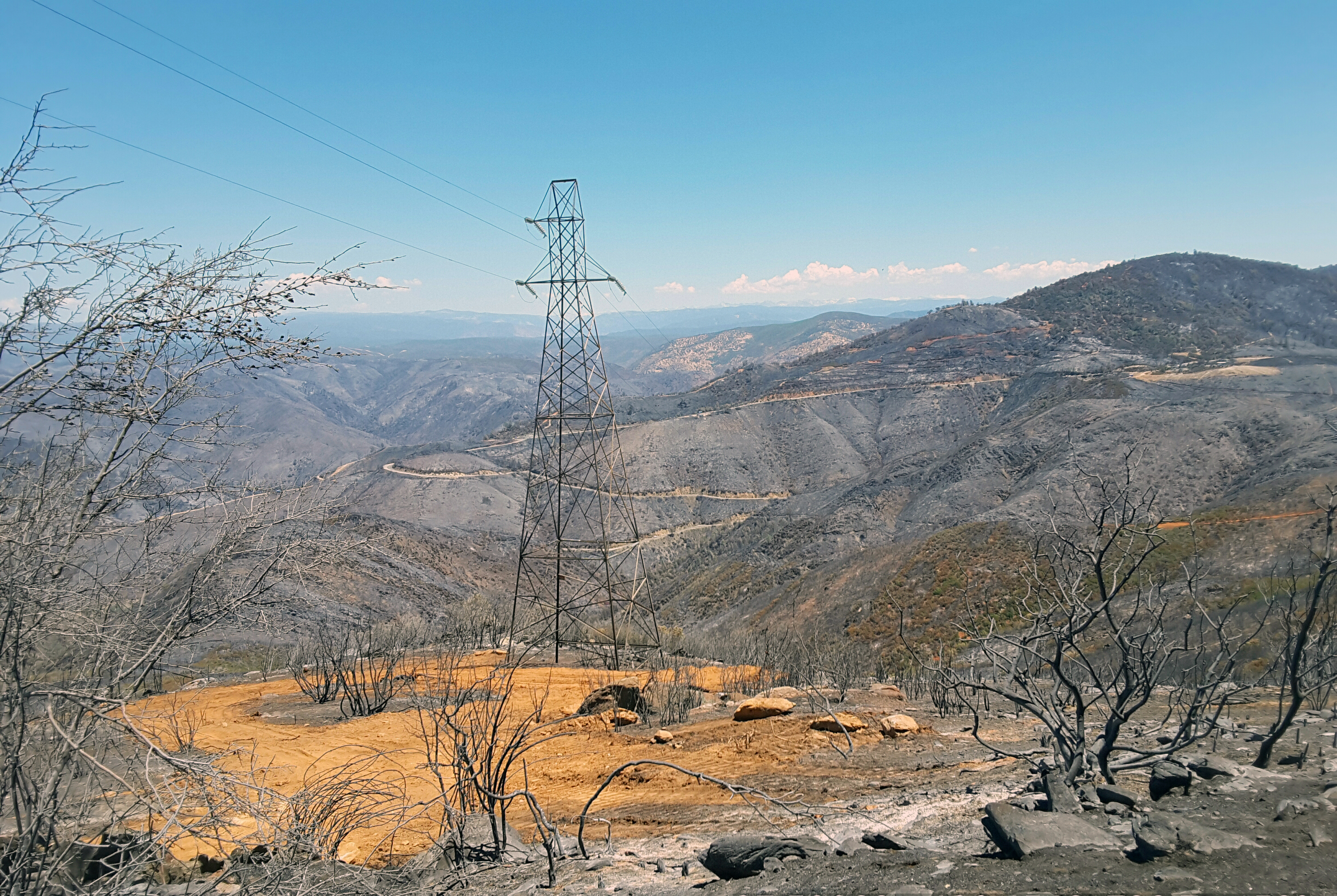
Aftermath of the fire

By the evening of Friday, August 4, CAL FIRE reported the fire to be at 97% containment. The cause of the fire was determined to be firearm-related, though specific details had not been released to the general public.

On August 24, the fire was declared fully contained, after weeks of burning.

== Effects ==
By July 19, about 4,000 people were under evacuation orders. Close to 8,500 people lost power when the fire damaged power lines in the area. Yosemite National Park also lost power for several hours on July 18.
