= Logtown, California =

Coordinates: 38.6333°N 120.8522°W

Logtown, also known as Empire City, is a former mining town located on California State Route 49 about 3 miles (4.8 km) southwest of Placerville in El Dorado County, California. It first appeared in the US census in 1850, however the exact date of the town's founding is unclear. The town would become a small resting point mentioned in passing by most in El Dorado county.

== Origin of name ==
While there is no definitive explanation for the name Logtown, it can be assumed to have been in common use by 1850 as it was widespread enough to have been used for the census. Locals speculate that the name came from a pine forest which originally stretched into the region, although oak trees are the most predominant in the immediate area. Another speculation suggests that the town's name came from a stack of logs from a mill, or was simply a reference to the materials used to build the first buildings in the area. Whatever the case, the name has stuck, although there was an attempt to rename the town as Empire City which may have been a reference to the Empire lead mine.

== History ==
The land which would become Logtown was originally inhabited by two Native American tribes, the Northern Sierra Miwok and the Nisenan. Their original name for the region has been lost, and the territory, along with the whole of California, was acquired following the Mexican War with the treaty of Guadalupe Hidalgo in February, 1848.

=== 19th century ===
Information regarding Logtown truly began with the discovery of gold in the territory which would eventually become California. The promise of gold lured many prospectors to the region hoping to make their fortune. With California receiving statehood in 1850, Logtown was listed within the census, then described as a small town, or burg, with 417 residents, 387 adult males, 5 adult females, and 25 children under eighteen. At this time most of the male residents in Logtown were placer miners, an indication of the primary industry which would come to define early Logtown. The Placer Times, would describe Logtown as having 20 stores and 2 taverns as well as various services such as a blacksmith, shoemaker, carpenter, and baker. Mining was the major industry for Logtown, with more than a dozen mines operating in the area. The most prominent mines would be the Pocahontas, Empire, Lamoille, Ophir, and Minehaha, as they would be described in a news article by the Placerville Mountain Democrat in 1858. Of these notable mines, the Pocahontas would perhaps be the most famed, opening in 1854 and reaching its peak in the mid-1870s before being abandoned by the 1900s following an economic crisis and the rapid exchange between several new owners. In 1854 Logtown was listed on the official map of the state of California, as well as receiving its own voting precinct for that year's election.

=== 20th century ===
With the turn of the century, agriculture would begin to supplant mining as the primary industry in Logtown, most notably seen with the decline of the Pocahontas Gold Mining Company. While agriculture had always been present within the area, even coexisting with mines, there were disputes at times over land claims, which would eventually be resolved. The Bidstrup, Hill, and Staples families owned the majority of the land in Logtown, these families would ultimately maneuver Logtown to an agricultural economy. The climate of the region was well suited for agriculture, and with plenty of land cattle grew as a business while mining slowly faded away. The Great Depression would shake the economic status quo in Logtown, as well as much of the world. This took the form of a return in interest for gold mining, although this was an interest born primarily out of desperation. In this brief period of time, mining resurged in the region, however this would not save the dying industry in the area despite the increased value of gold.

=== 21st century ===
Despite its bustling industry in previous years, Logtown today is a shadow of its former glory. The town had gradually declined, and the United States Geological Survey inadvertently dropped Logtown off the map, marking it only as an historical site. In 2018 Logtown residents successfully petitioned to have the town put back on the map. Today, The Gold Bug Park and Mine, founded in the 1880s, would become an informative museum, having hiking trails to previous mining locations, as well as information regarding mining practices used throughout Logtown's history.
