= Mariposa, California =

Mariposa
- Census-designated place
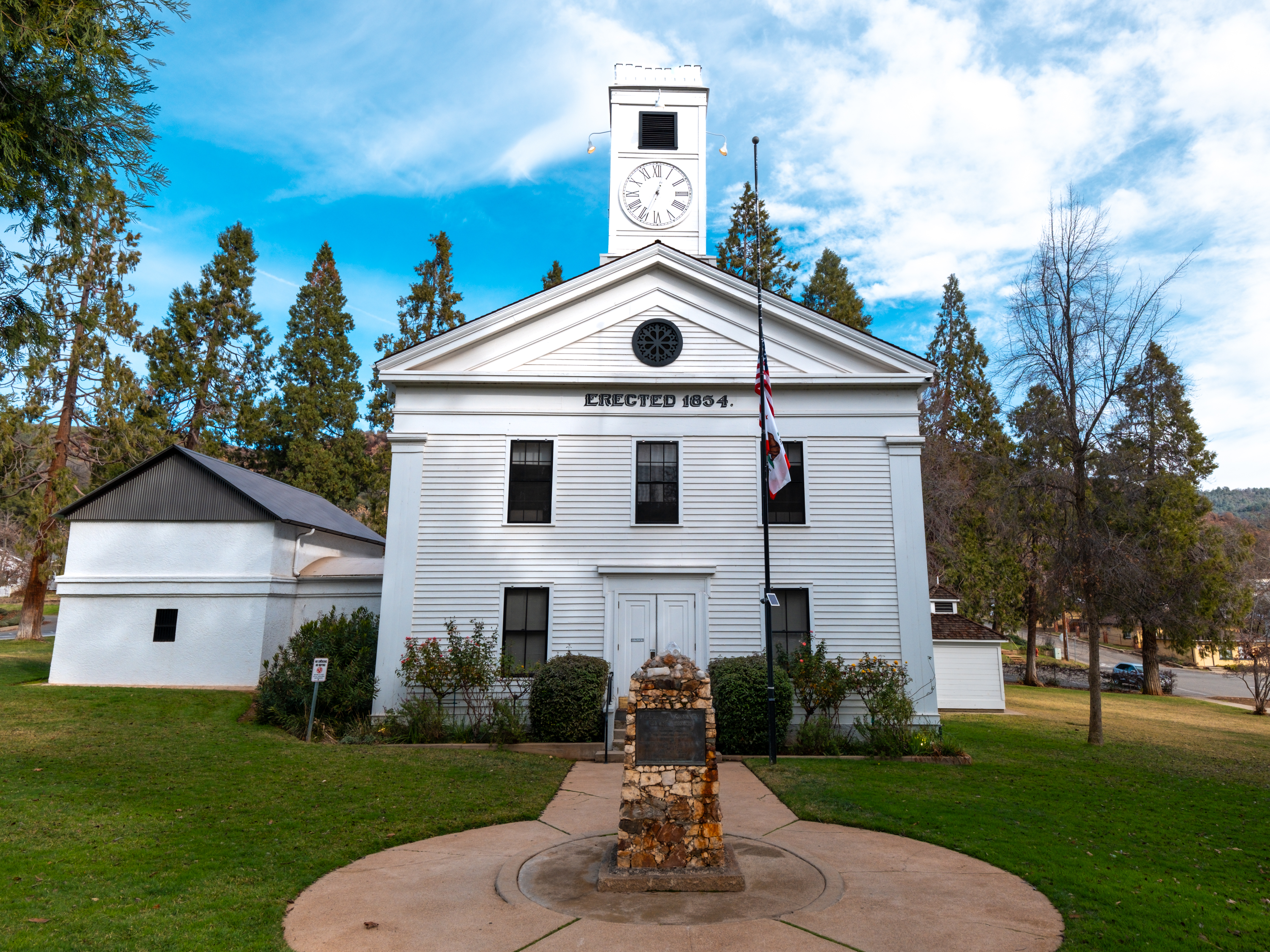
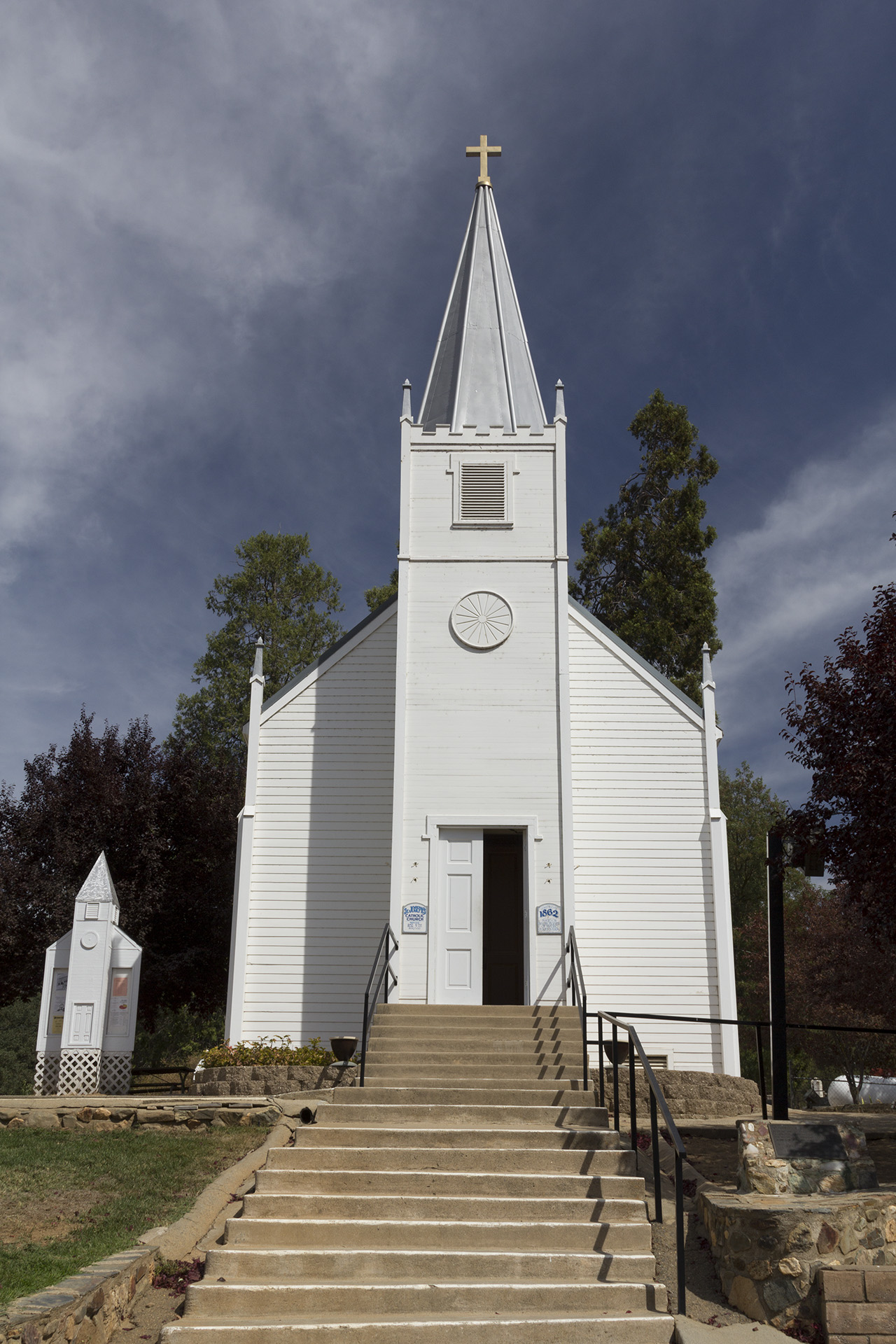
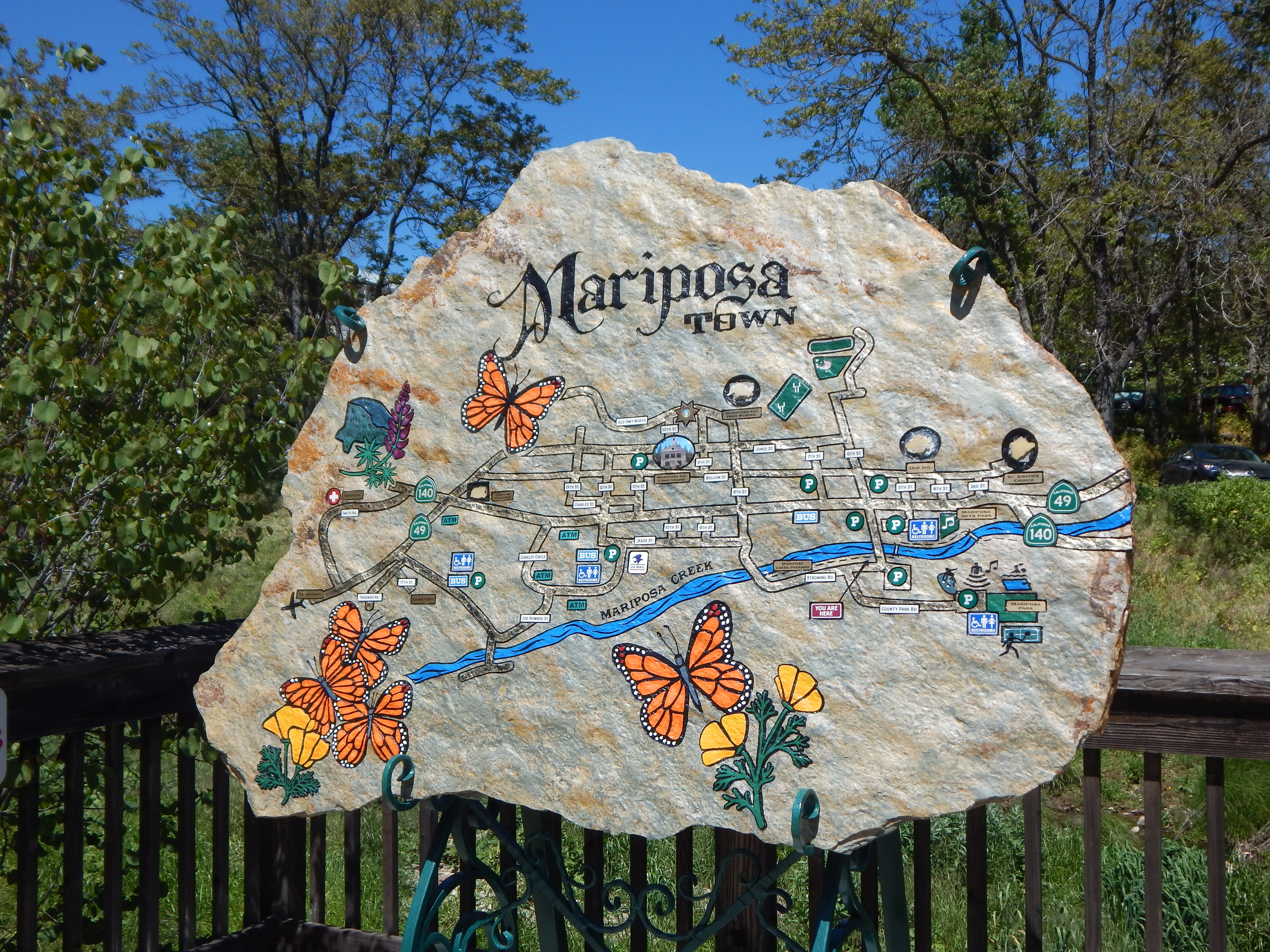
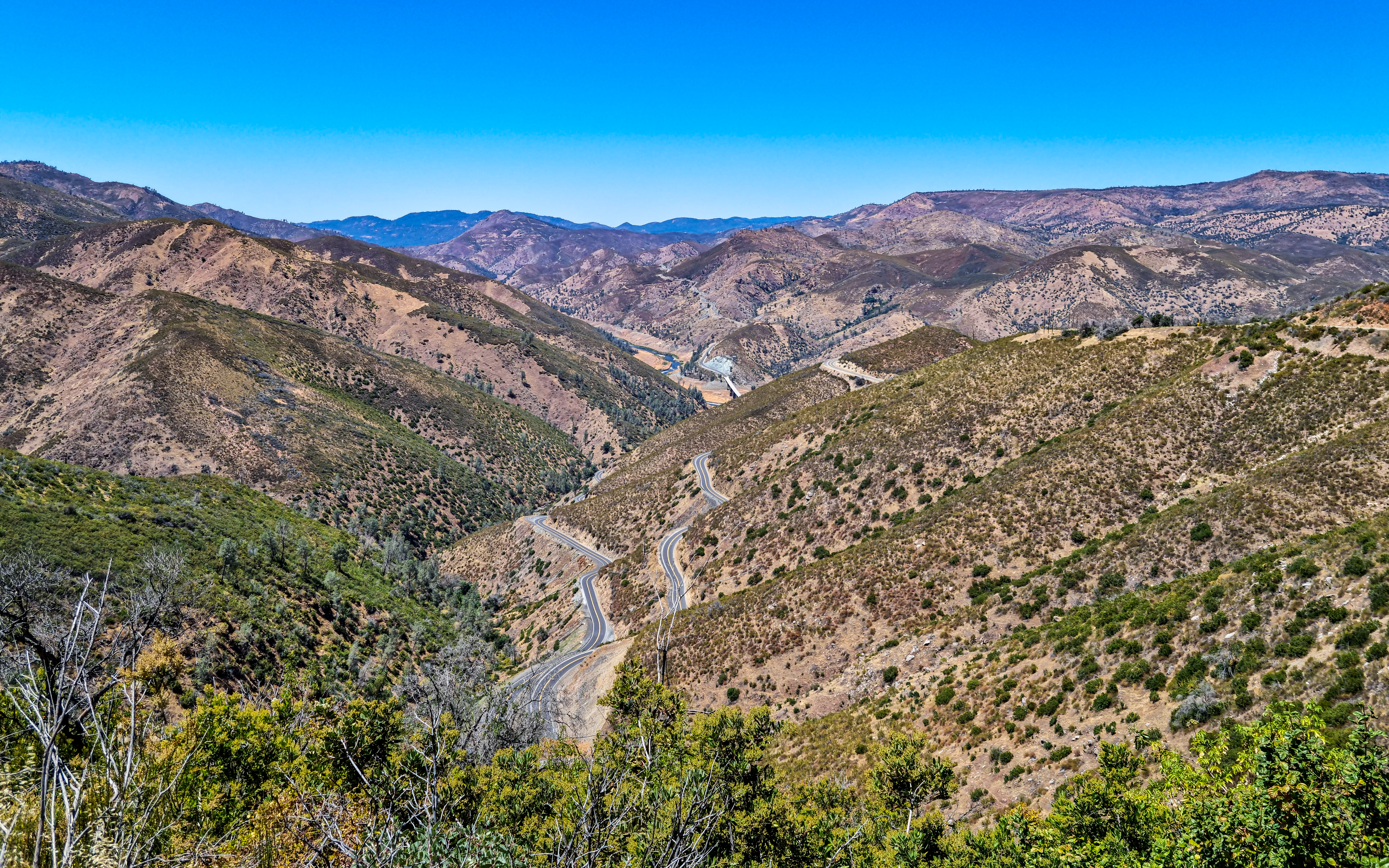
- Mariposa County Courthouse St. Joseph Catholic Church Mariposa Creek Parkway Sierra Nevada Foothills
- Interactive map of Mariposa
- Location within California Location within the United States
- Coordinates: 37°29′06″N 119°57′59″W
- Country: United States
- State: California
- County: Mariposa

Area
  - Total: 4.040 sq mi (10.46 km^{2})
  - Land: 4.037 sq mi (10.46 km^{2})
  - Water: 0.003 sq mi (0.0078 km^{2}) 0.07%
- Elevation: 2,015 ft (614 m)

Population (2020)
  - Total: 1,526
  - Density: 378/sq mi (146/km^{2})
- Time zone: UTC-8 (Pacific Time Zone)
  - Summer (DST): UTC-7 (PDT)
- ZIP code: 95338
- Area code: 209
- FIPS code: 06-45932
- GNIS feature ID: 2408181

Mariposa (/ˌmærɪˈpoʊzə, -sə/; Spanish for "Butterfly") is an unincorporated community and census-designated place (CDP) in and the county seat of Mariposa County, California, United States. The population was 1,526 at the 2020 census. Named for the monarch butterflies that overwinter there, the community's history is deeply intertwined with the California Gold Rush of the 19th century.

During the California Gold Rush, prospectors flocked to Mariposa for its rich mineral resources in streams and underground veins. Among them was John C. Frémont, Mariposa's most prominent resident, who leveraged his extensive mineral claims to achieve national prominence. He became the first U.S. senator from California and the inaugural Republican presidential candidate, significantly impacting both Mariposa and American politics during the 19th century's period of expansion.

Mariposa has numerous museums and landmarks that highlight its mining history. The county's proximity to Yosemite National Park also significantly contributes to its economy, with tourism playing a central role in supporting local businesses.

== Geography ==
Mariposa is nestled at an elevation of 2,015 feet (614 m) in the rugged foothills of the Sierra Nevada. According to the United States Census Bureau, the CDP covers a total area of 4.04 square miles (10.46 km^{2}), with nearly all of it being land. The community is situated in the valley of Mariposa Creek, which flows south then southwest into the San Joaquin Valley.

Major highways intersect in Mariposa; California State Route 49 and California State Route 140 merge for 0.8 miles (1.3 km) through the town's main street. Route 49 extends southeast to Oakhurst and northwest to Coulterville, while Route 140 leads southwest to Merced in the San Joaquin Valley and northeast to Yosemite Valley.

The area's soil predominantly consists of brown to reddish brown loam of the Blasingame series, and a gravelly loam known as the Boomer series. These soils support a thick grassland and diverse trees such as blue oak, black oak, gray pine, and ponderosa pine. To the west-northwest of the town, sparse vegetation and rockland are underlain by serpentine soil of the Henneke series.

=== Climate ===
According to the Köppen climate classification system, Mariposa has a hot-summer Mediterranean climate (abbreviated "Csa" on climate maps) and wet winters.

Climate data for Mariposa, 1991–2020 simulated normals (2142 ft elevation)
Month	Jan	Feb	Mar	Apr	May	Jun	Jul	Aug	Sep	Oct	Nov	Dec	Year
Mean daily maximum °F (°C)	56.8 (13.8)	58.1 (14.5)	62.1 (16.7)	66.7 (19.3)	76.5 (24.7)	86.4 (30.2)	93.9 (34.4)	93.4 (34.1)	87.8 (31.0)	77.0 (25.0)	64.8 (18.2)	56.3 (13.5)	73.3 (23.0)
Daily mean °F (°C)	46.4 (8.0)	47.7 (8.7)	50.9 (10.5)	54.5 (12.5)	62.4 (16.9)	70.9 (21.6)	78.4 (25.8)	77.7 (25.4)	72.5 (22.5)	63.0 (17.2)	52.7 (11.5)	46.0 (7.8)	60.3 (15.7)
Mean daily minimum °F (°C)	36.1 (2.3)	37.2 (2.9)	39.9 (4.4)	42.3 (5.7)	48.6 (9.2)	55.4 (13.0)	63.0 (17.2)	62.1 (16.7)	57.2 (14.0)	48.9 (9.4)	40.8 (4.9)	35.6 (2.0)	47.3 (8.5)
Average precipitation inches (mm)	6.23 (158.12)	5.18 (131.55)	4.66 (118.24)	2.42 (61.55)	1.13 (28.73)	0.31 (7.93)	0.07 (1.82)	0.03 (0.79)	0.17 (4.24)	1.62 (41.13)	2.63 (66.91)	5.41 (137.34)	29.86 (758.35)
Average dew point °F (°C)	35.4 (1.9)	37.9 (3.3)	41.0 (5.0)	41.9 (5.5)	44.4 (6.9)	46.0 (7.8)	47.8 (8.8)	45.5 (7.5)	42.8 (6.0)	39.7 (4.3)	37.9 (3.3)	34.5 (1.4)	41.2 (5.1)
Source: PRISM Climate Group

== History ==
=== Early Inhabitants and Spanish Naming ===
Before Spanish arrival, the Southern Sierra Miwok lived in what is now Mariposa. In 1806, a Spanish priest traveling with early California explorer Gabriel Moraga named the area. When the expedition came upon a creek filled with thousands of yellow butterflies, they called it “Las Mariposas,” the Spanish word for butterflies.

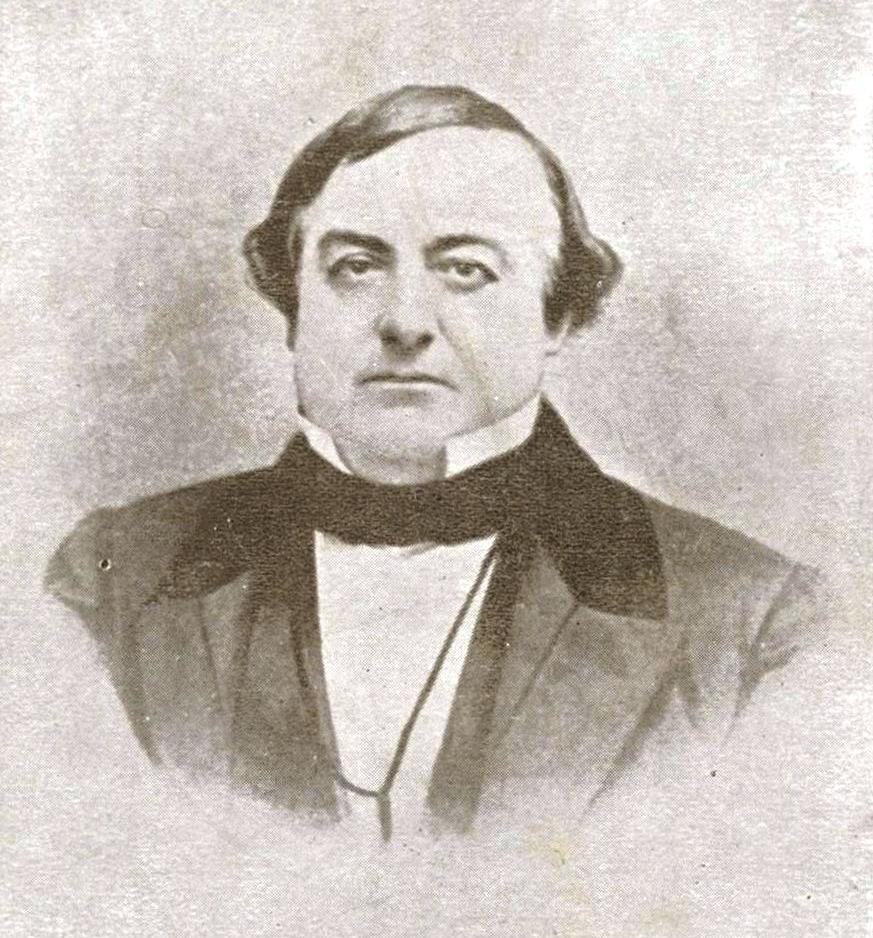
Juan Bautista Alvarado (1809-1882), Governor of Alta California and owner of Rancho Las Mariposas under Mexican rule

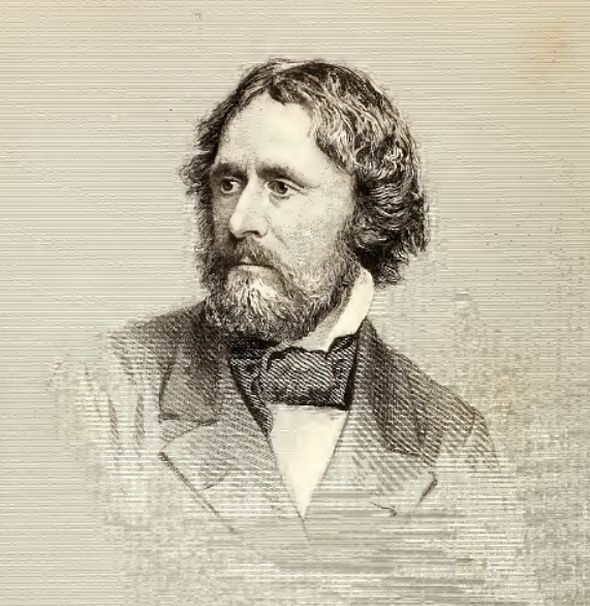
John C. Frémont (1813-1890), explorer, military officer, and owner of Rancho Las Mariposas during the California Gold Rush

=== Rancho Las Mariposas ===
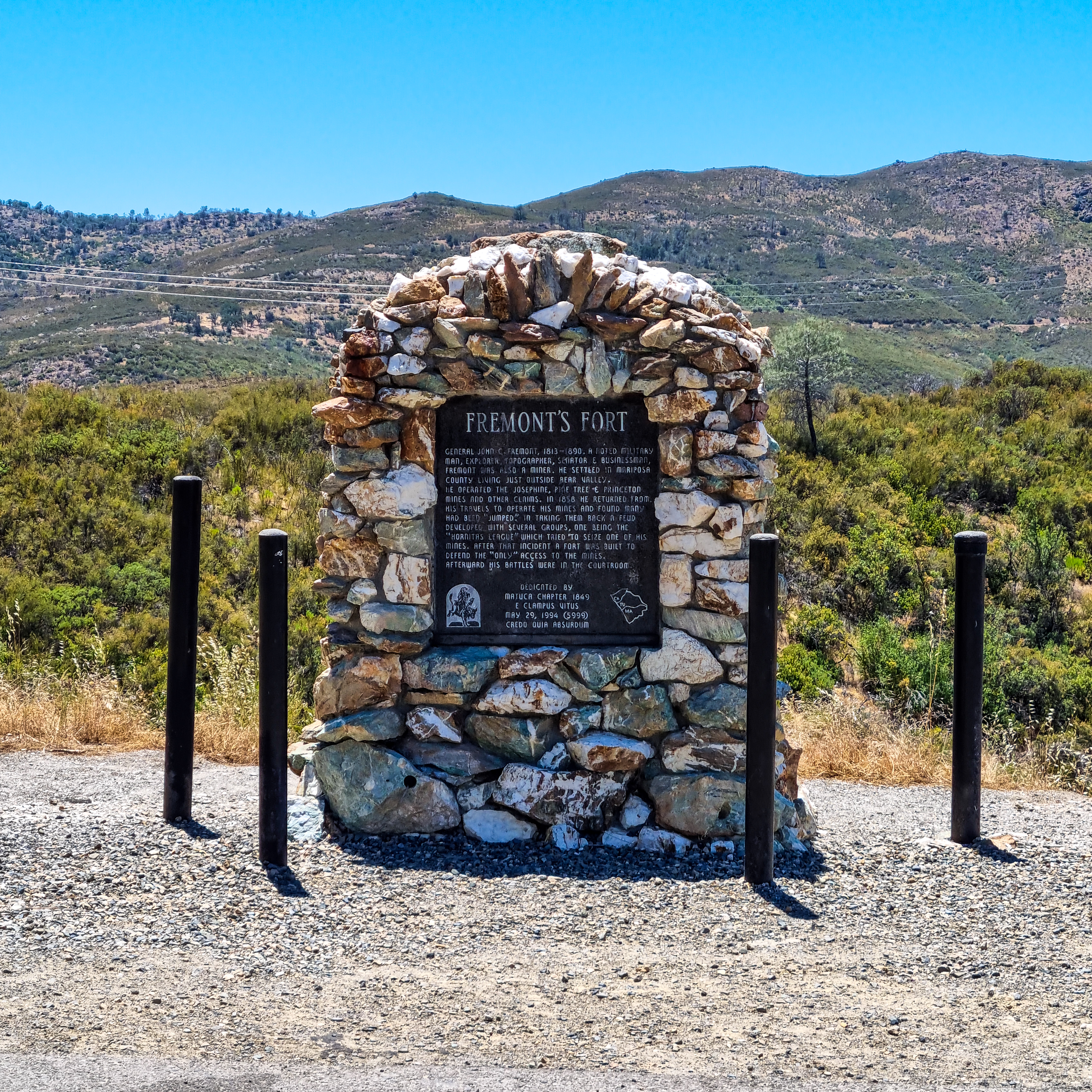
Fremont's Fort historical marker near Mariposa

In 1847, John C. Frémont purchased a 70-square-mile land parcel known as Las Mariposas for $3,000. Formerly owned by Governor Juan Bautista Alvarado, the ranch turned profitable once Frémont discovered a five-mile quartz vein producing hundreds of pounds of placer gold monthly. Its “floating grant” status, however, sparked extensive property and mineral-rights disputes. Squatters and mining companies contested ownership until 1856, when the U.S. Supreme Court ruled in Frémont's favor. The Mariposa Estate covered 44,000 acres in the heart of the Mother Lode region, where gold pockets in quartz veins could yield between $100 and $30,000. By 1915, total output surpassed $12 million in gold.

=== Founding of Mariposa ===
Mariposa's rise as a gold rush boom town began along a seasonal trickle called Agua Fría, where prospectors—lured by tales of glimmering placer gold—pitched their first camp. When floods and fires during the winter of 1849–1850 forced them to higher ground, they relocated near Mariposa Creek, establishing a bustling county seat by 1851. The historic courthouse, completed in 1854, still stands.

=== Mariposa War ===
During the early 1850s, tensions between local Native tribes—primarily the Southern Sierra Miwok—and white settlers peaked, prompting the Mariposa War. The conflict stemmed largely from the presence of miners and the trading operations of James Savage along the Merced River and Mariposa Creek. Alarmed by escalating violence, Mariposa residents formed volunteer militias. With state backing, these militias eventually secured control of the area. Modern historians also consider the Mariposa War part of the California Genocide, and it indirectly led to the so-called “discovery” and naming of Yosemite Valley. By the late 19th century, many Miwok people had been forced from their ancestral lands.

=== Twentieth Century and Beyond ===
In 1914, voters in Mariposa County narrowly approved the creation of a county high school. Following a bond measure of $12,000 and the donation of nearly eight acres of land by the Mariposa Commercial and Mining Company, the school's permanent campus opened in 1917.

During World War II, the U.S. Army constructed the Mariposa Auxiliary Field (1942–1945) to train pilots; post-war, the site was redeveloped as today's Mariposa-Yosemite Airport.

On July 18, 2017, the town was evacuated due to the rapidly spreading Detwiler Fire, which threatened Mariposa and its surroundings.

== Demographics ==
Historical population
Census	Pop.	Note	%±
1980	1,150		—
1990	1,152		0.2%
U.S. Decennial Census; 1850–1870 1880-1890; 1900 1910 1920; 1930 1940 1950; 1960 1970 1980; 1990 2000 2010

Mariposa first appeared as a census-designated place in the 1980 United States census.

=== 2020 census ===
As of the 2020 census, Mariposa had a population of 1,526. The median age was 50.1 years. 17.7% of residents were under the age of 18 and 30.0% of residents were 65 years of age or older. For every 100 females there were 90.3 males, and for every 100 females age 18 and over there were 83.6 males age 18 and over.

0.0% of residents lived in urban areas, while 100.0% lived in rural areas.

There were 703 households in Mariposa, of which 21.9% had children under the age of 18 living in them. Of all households, 30.7% were married-couple households, 23.5% were households with a male householder and no spouse or partner present, and 39.4% were households with a female householder and no spouse or partner present. About 44.1% of all households were made up of individuals and 21.1% had someone living alone who was 65 years of age or older.

There were 836 housing units, of which 15.9% were vacant. The homeowner vacancy rate was 2.2% and the rental vacancy rate was 4.6%.

Racial composition as of the 2020 census
Race	Number	Percent
White	1,171	76.7%
Black or African American	9	0.6%
American Indian and Alaska Native	53	3.5%
Asian	28	1.8%
Native Hawaiian and Other Pacific Islander	0	0.0%
Some other race	75	4.9%
Two or more races	190	12.5%
Hispanic or Latino (of any race)	208	13.6%

=== Demographic estimates ===
About 40.0% of residents have at least a bachelor's degree. The median household income was $52,661, while the employment rate was 32.7%.

The rate of residents below the poverty line was 30.6% compared to 12.0% statewide. The percentage of government workers in the workforce was 24.8% compared to the statewide average. The homeownership rate was 62.8%.

== Government and public safety ==
=== Government representation ===
In the California State Legislature, Mariposa is in the 4th senatorial district, represented by Republican Marie Alvarado-Gil, and in the 8th Assembly district, represented by Republican David Tangipa. The county is administered by its elected five-member County Board of Supervisors.

=== Policing and public safety ===
The county's policing agency is the Mariposa County Sheriff and staff. The Mariposa County Fire Department provides fire protection and emergency medical aid.

== Historic sites and attractions ==
=== Mariposa Town Historic District ===
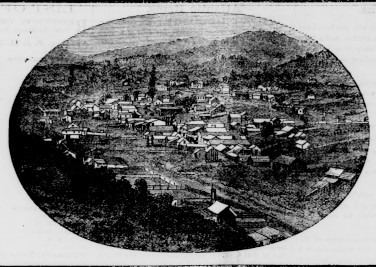
Etching of Mariposa in 1860. It was used as the logo for the Mariposa Gazette newspaper

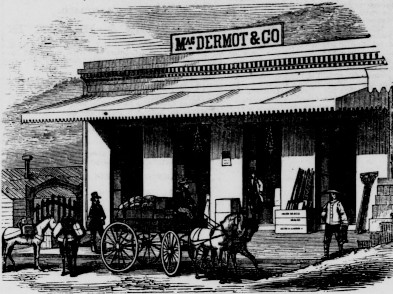
Etching of Mac' Dermont & Co building on Main Street, 1861

The Mariposa Town Historic District was listed on the National Register of Historic Places in 1991. The district contains 63 contributing historic buildings associated with the town's development during and after the California Gold Rush. Among its landmarks are the Mariposa County Courthouse, built in 1854, and St. Joseph's Catholic Church, completed in 1863.

=== Museums ===
The Mariposa Museum and History Center, founded in 1957, maintains exhibits and collections relating to Native American history, Spanish and Mexican California, the California Gold Rush, Yosemite National Park, and the history of Mariposa County. Its collections include photographs, archival material, and county records.

The California State Mining and Mineral Museum, located at the Mariposa County Fairgrounds, is part of the California State Parks system. Its collection originated in 1880 under state mineralogist Henry G. Hanks and includes more than 13,000 minerals, rocks, gems, fossils, and mining artifacts. Among its best-known objects is the crystalline-gold Fricot Nugget.

=== Mariposa County Fairgrounds ===
The Mariposa County Fairgrounds are located about 3 miles (4.8 km) southeast of the town along State Route 49. Established in 1939, the fairgrounds host the annual Mariposa County Fair, whose events have included rodeos and demolition derbies.

== Notable people ==
Some living past and present notable residents in alphabetical order include:

- John C. Frémont, first U.S. senator from California and explorer of the West
- Jessie Benton Frémont, writer and wife of John C. Fremont, daughter of Senator Thomas Hart Benton
- Jon Leicester, baseball pitcher for the Orix Buffaloes
- Sal Maccarone, international author and sculptor
- Logan Mankins, guard for New England Patriots football team
- Frederick Law Olmsted, landscape architect
- George Radanovich, politician and author
- Jacoby Shaddix, founding member of rock band Papa Roach
- Paul Vasquez, filmed video Double Rainbow
- Cody Wichmann, offensive guard for Los Angeles Rams
- Alexander Barnabas Putrament, early Polish settler immortalised in a Sienkiewicz short story.
