= Ghirardelli Chocolate Company =

American confectioner founded in 1852

The Ghirardelli Chocolate Company
- Type: Subsidiary
- Founded: 1852; 174 years ago San Francisco, California, US
- Founder: Domenico "Domingo" Ghirardelli
- Headquarters: San Leandro, California, US
- Products: Chocolate products
- Parent: Lindt & Sprüngli
- Website: www.ghirardelli.com

The Ghirardelli Chocolate Company, simply known as Ghirardelli (/ˌɡɪrərˈdɛli/ GHIRR-ər-DEL-ee), is an American confectioner, wholly owned by multinational confectioner Lindt & Sprüngli. The company was founded by and is named after Italian chocolatier Domenico Ghirardelli, who, after working in South America, moved to California. The Ghirardelli Chocolate Company was incorporated in 1852, and is the third-oldest chocolate company in the US, after Baker's Chocolate and Whitman's.

== History ==
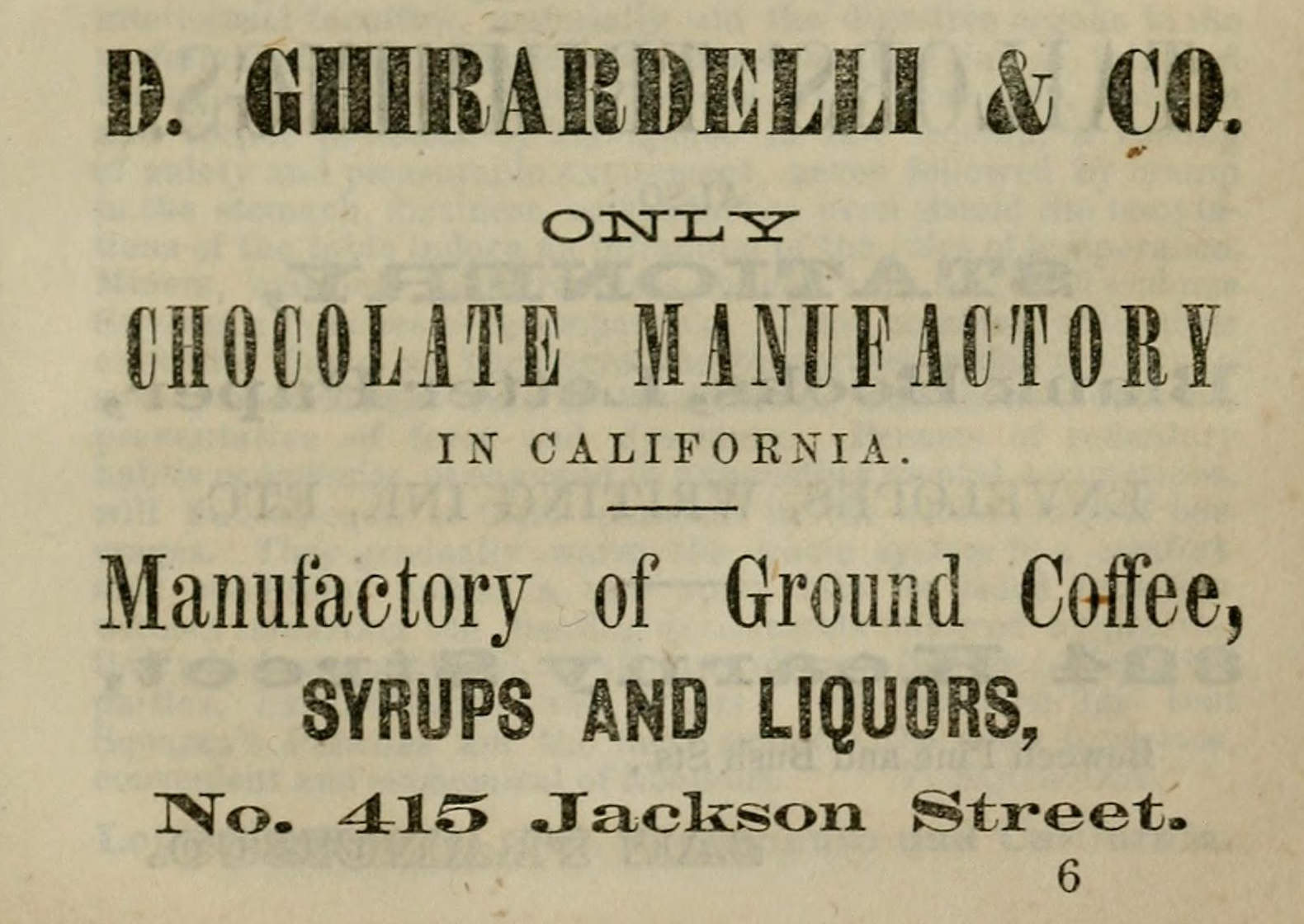
1864 advertisement from The California Miner's Almanac

=== Origins ===
In 1817, Domenico Ghirardelli was born in Rapallo, Italy, to an "exotic foods importer" and his wife. Domenico received his first education in the chocolate trade when he was apprenticed to a local candymaker as a child. By the time he was 20, Ghirardelli had sailed to Uruguay with his wife to work in a chocolate and coffee business. A year later, Ghirardelli moved to Lima, Peru, and opened a confectionery store. In 1847, nine years later, James Lick (Ghirardelli's neighbor) moved to San Francisco, California, with 600 lb (270 kg) of Ghirardelli's chocolate. Ghirardelli remained and continued to operate his store in Peru.

=== The move to California ===
In 1849, Ghirardelli received news of the gold strike at Sutter's Mill and sailed to California. After doing some prospecting, Ghirardelli opened a general store in Stockton, California, offering supplies and confections to fellow miners. Ghirardelli's tent-based store was one of the first shops set up in the area.

Between 1856 and 1859, during the latter days of the California gold rush (1848–1855), Ghirardelli had a general store in Hornitos, California, where he perfected his chocolate recipes. The remains of the store can still be seen in town.

=== Early history in San Francisco ===
Several months after opening his Stockton store, Ghirardelli opened a second store on the corner of Broadway and Battery in San Francisco, which became, in 1850, his first establishment in that city.

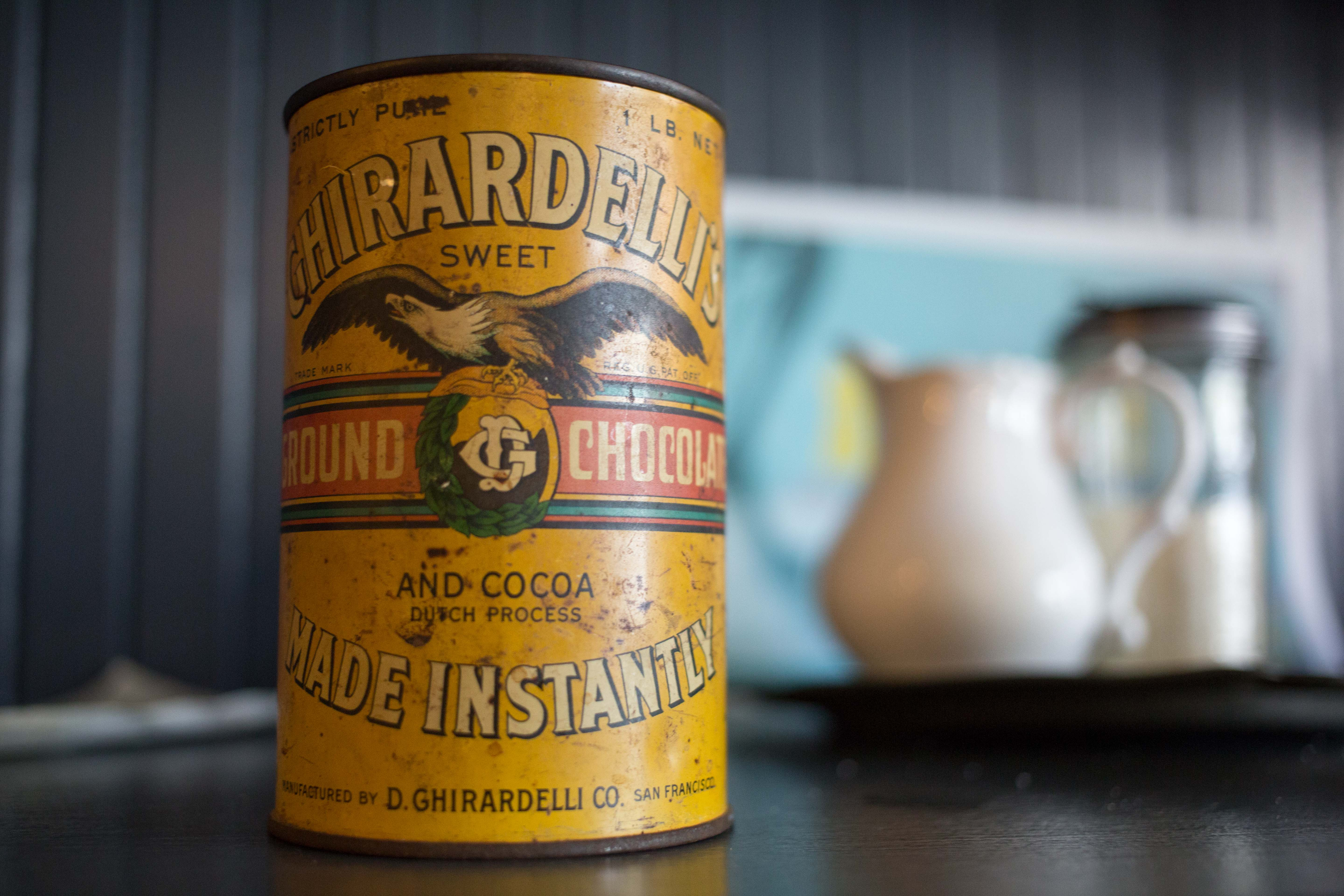
A can of chocolate from the 20th century

A fire on May 3, 1851, destroyed Ghirardelli's San Francisco business, and a few days later, his Stockton store also burned down. However, in September of the same year, Ghirardelli used his remaining assets to open the Cairo Coffee House in San Francisco. This business venture proved unsuccessful. In 1852, Ghirardelli opened a new store, named Ghirardelli & Girard on the corner of Washington and Kearny Streets in San Francisco. Soon afterward, Ghirardelli was making enough money to send for his family, who were still living in Peru. He changed the company's name to D. Ghirardelli & Co. and, in 1852, imported 200 lb (91 kg) of cocoa beans. The company was incorporated in 1852 and has been in continuous operation since.

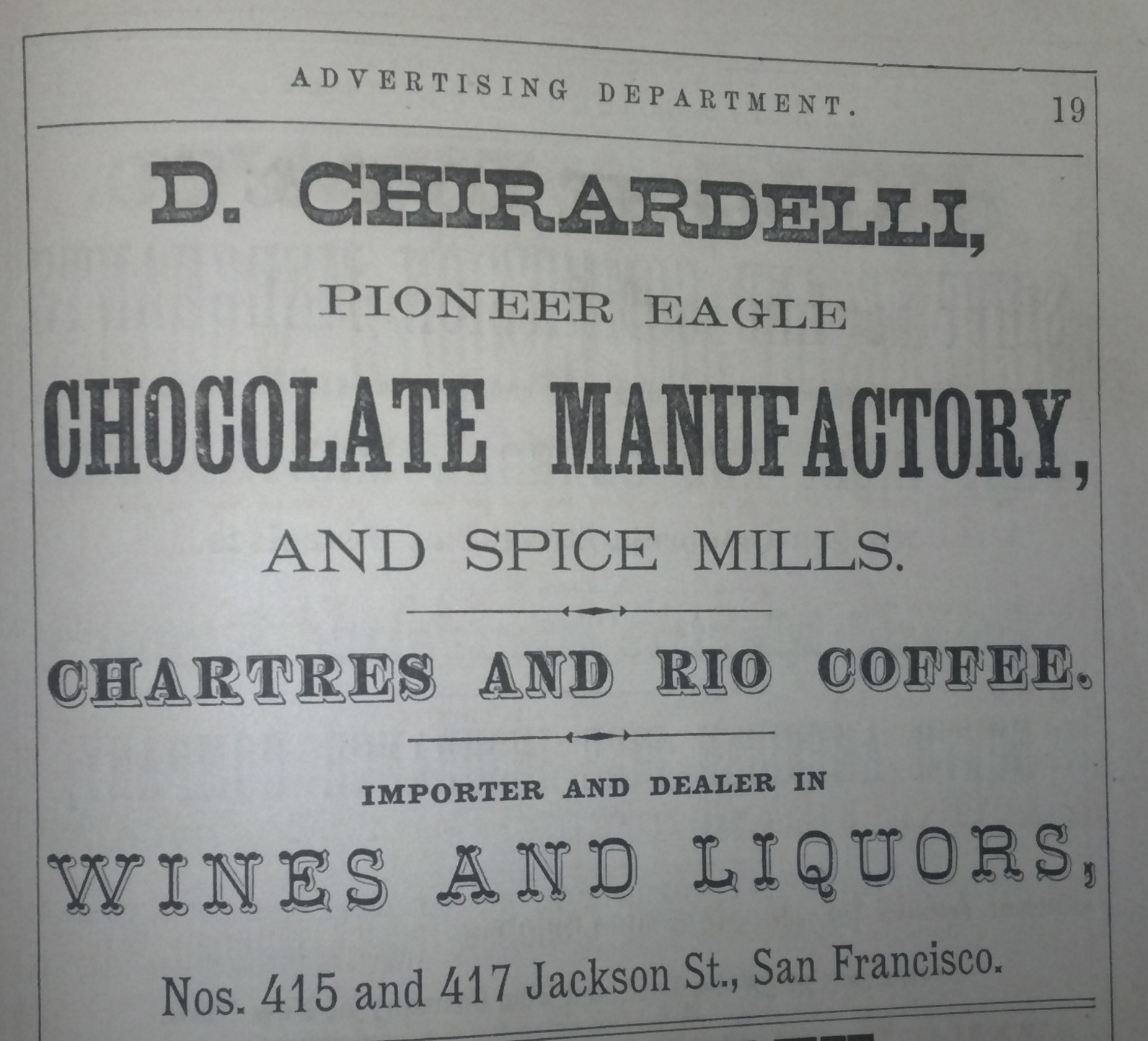
1871 Ghirardelli advertisement

The next year, in 1853, the business relocated to the corner of Jackson and Mason Streets. By 1855, a larger manufacturing facility was needed, and so the factory was moved to the corner of Greenwich and Powell Streets, while the office remained at the previous location. During this time, the company sold liquor, but dropped their line of alcoholic products sometime after 1871. By 1866, the company was importing 1,000 lb (450 kg) of cocoa seeds a year. By that time, the company not only sold chocolate, but also coffee and spices to the United States, China, Japan, and Mexico. In 1885, the company imported 450,000 lb (200,000 kg) of cocoa seeds.

In 1892, Ghirardelli retired as head of the company and was replaced by his three sons. Two years later, on January 17, 1894, Ghirardelli died at age 77 in Rapallo, Italy.

=== 1900-present ===
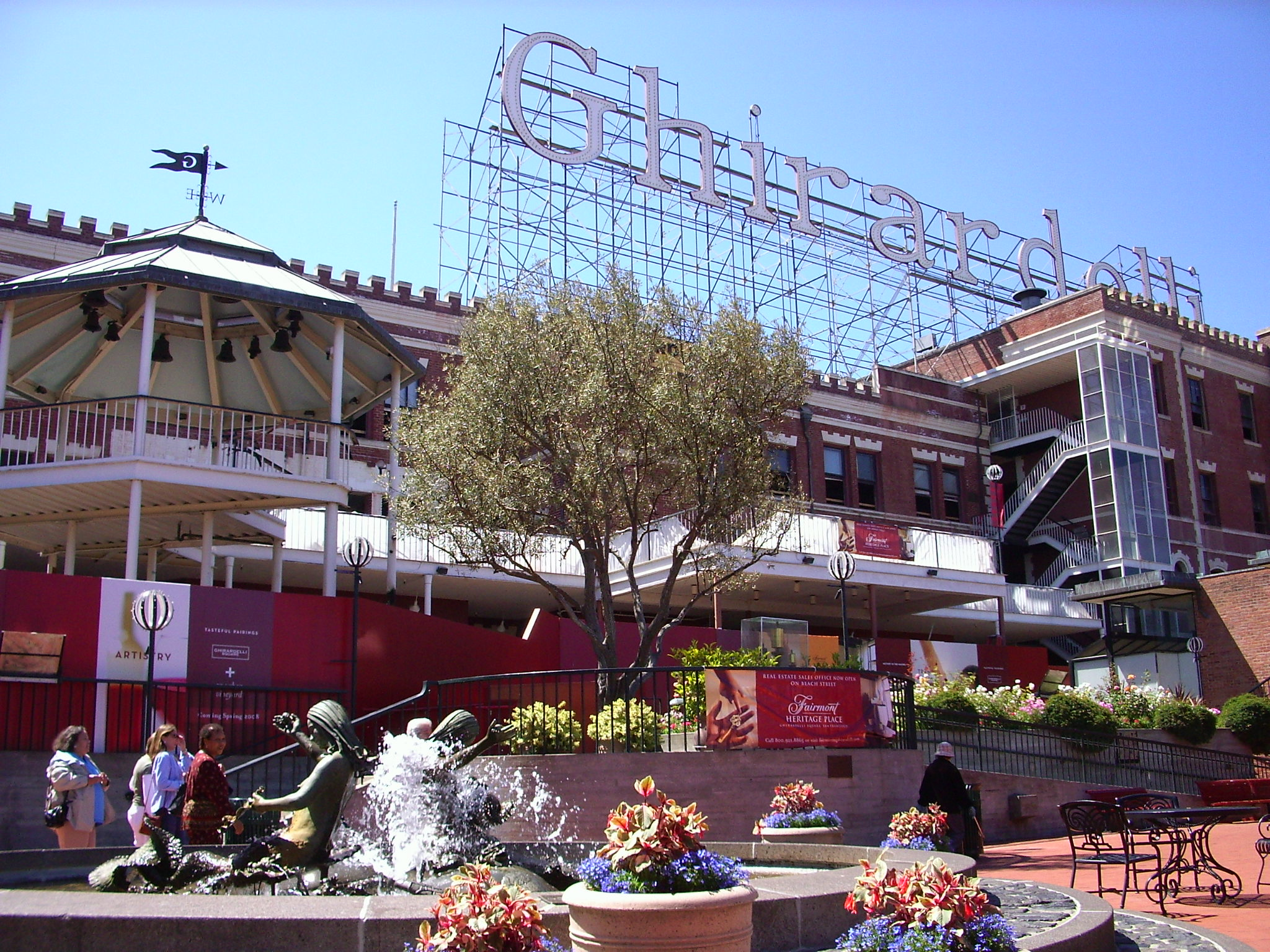
Ghirardelli Square in San Francisco

By 1900, Ghirardelli's company was selling only chocolate and mustard, having sold its coffee and spices businesses. Further expansion over the years into different buildings allowed the company to expand into new markets and grow financially. In 1965, San Francisco declared Ghirardelli Square (where many of the Ghirardelli buildings were constructed) an official city landmark. Two years later, production facilities moved to San Leandro, California (37.711°N 122.145°W).

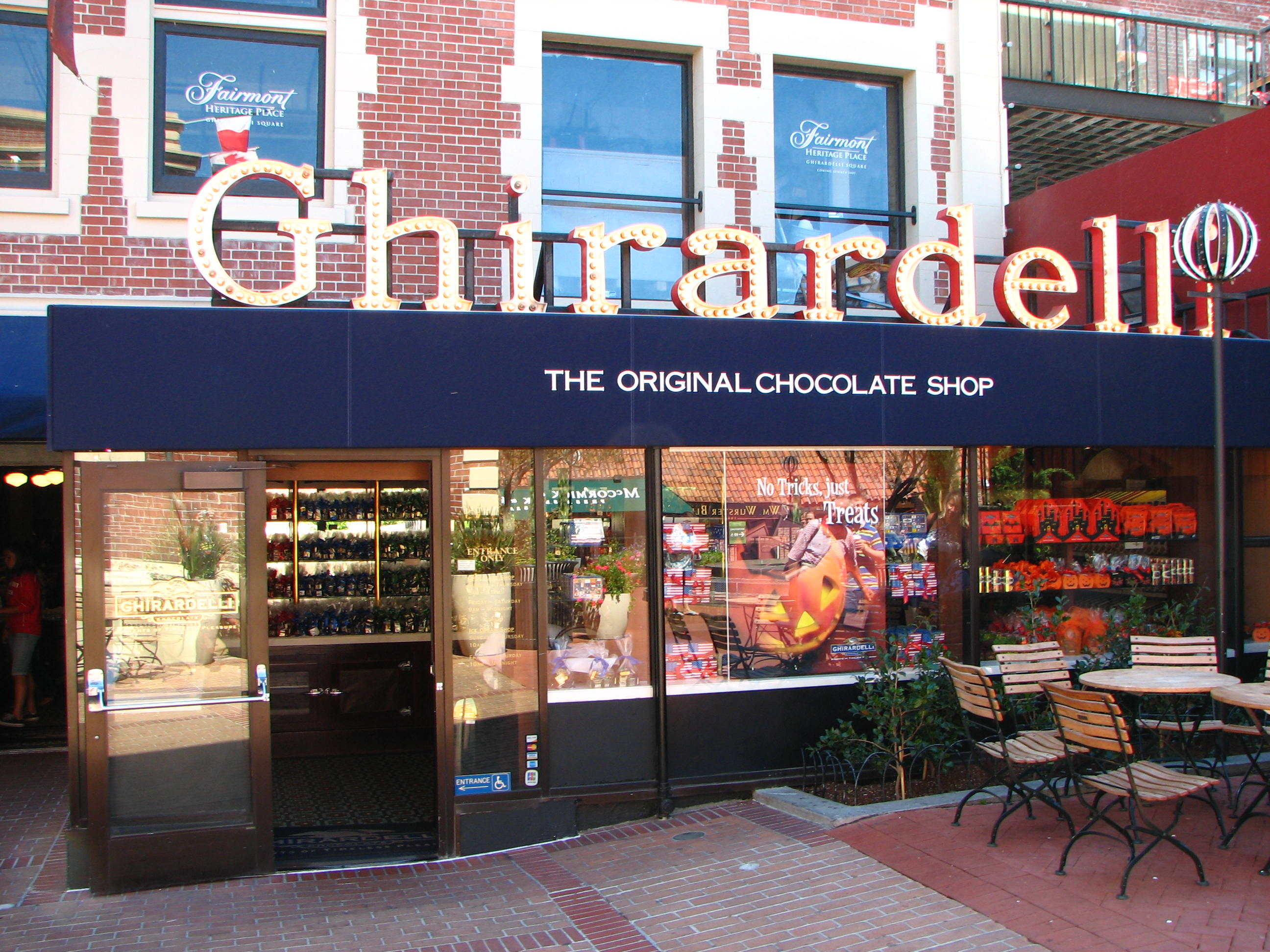
Ghirardelli Chocolate Shop, San Francisco

Since the 1960s Ghirardelli has also moved to focus on a restaurant division by selling ice cream sundaes, complete with their famous hot fudge chocolate sauce. In one of their earliest menus from the 1960s they featured five "Nob Hill Sundaes" all named after different landmarks, historical aspects, or local figures from San Francisco (Twin Peaks, Golden Gate Banana Split, Strike it Rich, The Rock, and the Emperor Norton). As of 2024, they feature 11 different sundaes (World Famous Hot Fudge, Ocean Beach, Chocolate Lovers, Gold Rush, Mint Bliss, Strawberry Passion, Non-Dairy Hot Fudge, Cookie Crumble, Lands End, Golden Gate Banana Split, and Treasure Island).

In 1963, Ghirardelli Chocolate Company was bought by Vincent DeDomenico and the Golden Grain Macaroni Company, maker of Rice-A-Roni. Later, in 1986, Quaker Oats bought Golden Grain, and thus Ghirardelli. In 1992, Quaker Oats sold the Ghirardelli Chocolate division to a private investment group. John J. Anton, from that group, became the president and CEO of the newly independent Ghirardelli Chocolate Company. In 1998, Lindt and Sprüngli, from Switzerland, acquired Ghirardelli Chocolate Company as a wholly owned subsidiary of its holding company.

In 2015, an independent laboratory tested 127 chocolate products for lead and cadmium, and found that 96 of them contained lead and/or cadmium above the safety threshold defined by California's Proposition 65. Based on these results, As You Sow filed notices with over 20 companies, including Ghirardelli and Trader Joe's, for failing to provide the legally required warning to consumers that their chocolate products contain cadmium, lead, or both. The suit was settled in 2018.

== Production ==
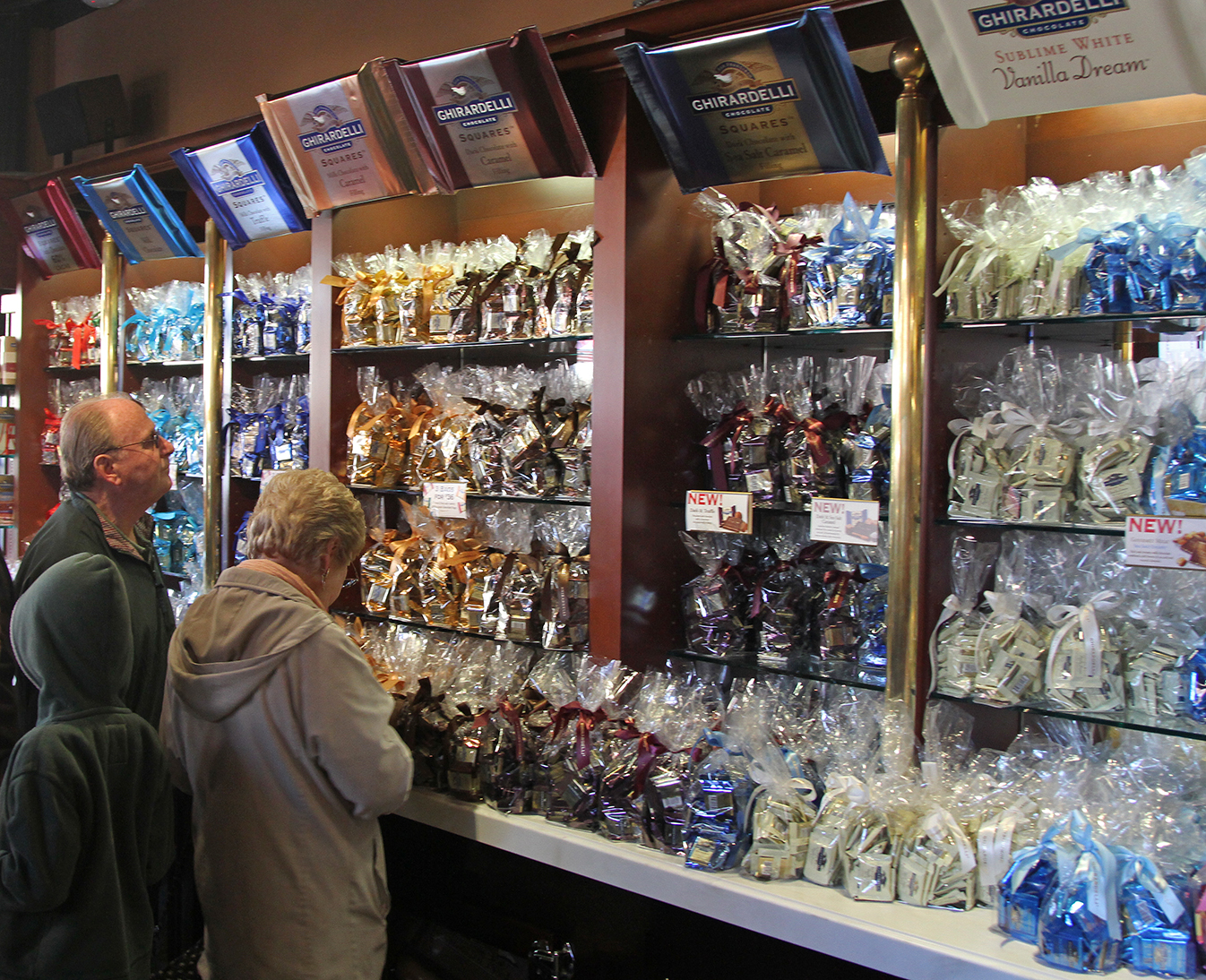
A selection of Ghirardelli chocolates in the Ghirardelli Chocolate Company Shop at Ghirardelli Square in San Francisco, California

According to their own website, Ghirardelli is one of the few chocolate companies in the United States to control every aspect of its chocolate manufacturing process, rejecting up to 40% of the cocoa seeds shipped in order to select what the company calls the "highest quality" seeds. The company then roasts the cocoa seeds in-house by removing the outer shell on the seed and roasting the inside of the seed, or the nibs. The chocolate is then ground and refined until the particles are 19 micrometers (0.00075 in) in size.

== Products ==
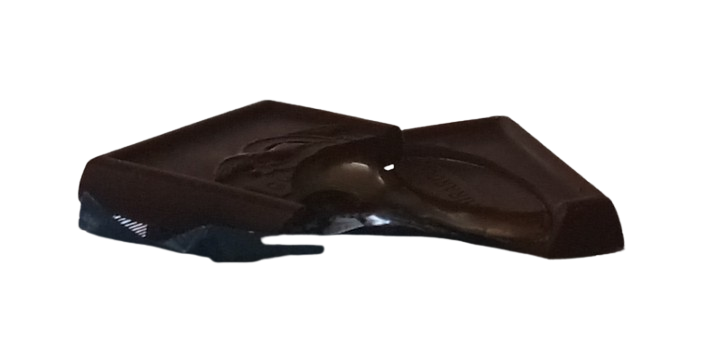
Ghirardelli Dark Chocolate Sea Salt, split in half, showing the filling.

Ghirardelli produces several flavors of chocolate. The chocolate is sold in bar form or in miniature squares.

Ghirardelli also sells food service items, like chocolate beverages and flavored sauces, to other retailers.

== See also ==
- Guittard Chocolate Company
- Abuelita, brand name of Mexican-based hot chocolate
- Ibarra, brand name of Mexican-based hot chocolate
- List of bean-to-bar chocolate manufacturers
