= San Francisco Fire of 1851 =

Disaster in California, US

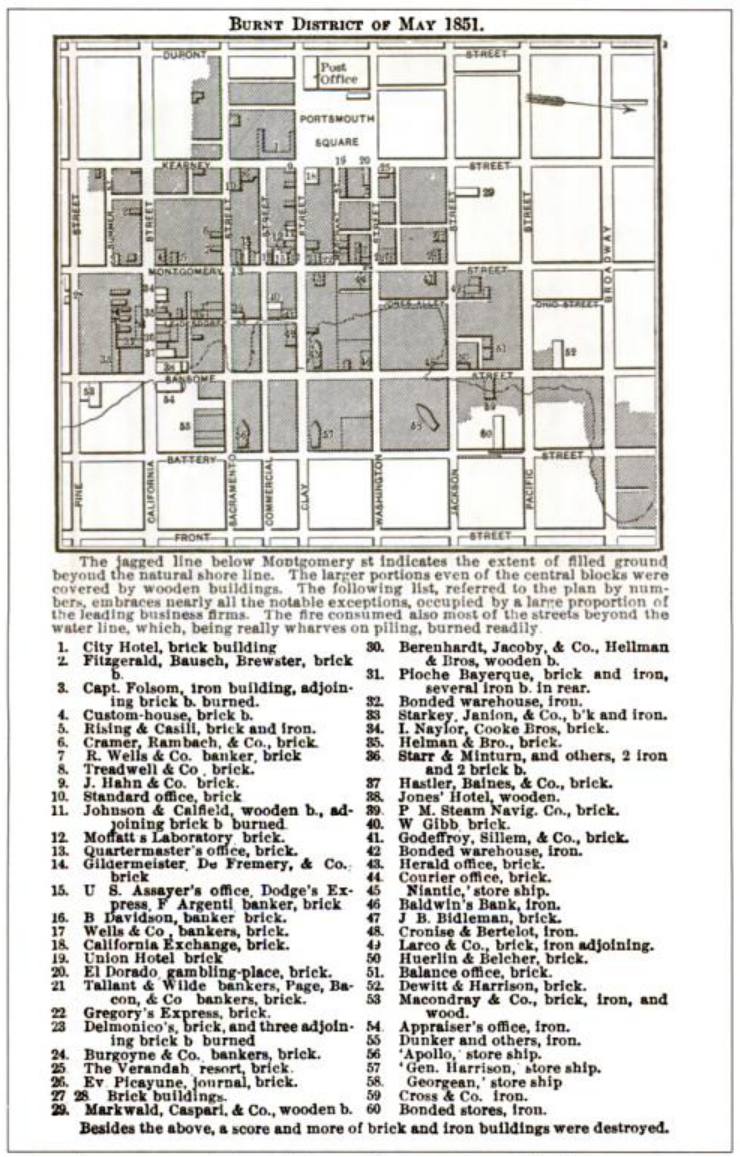
Map of the area burned in the fire of May 1851

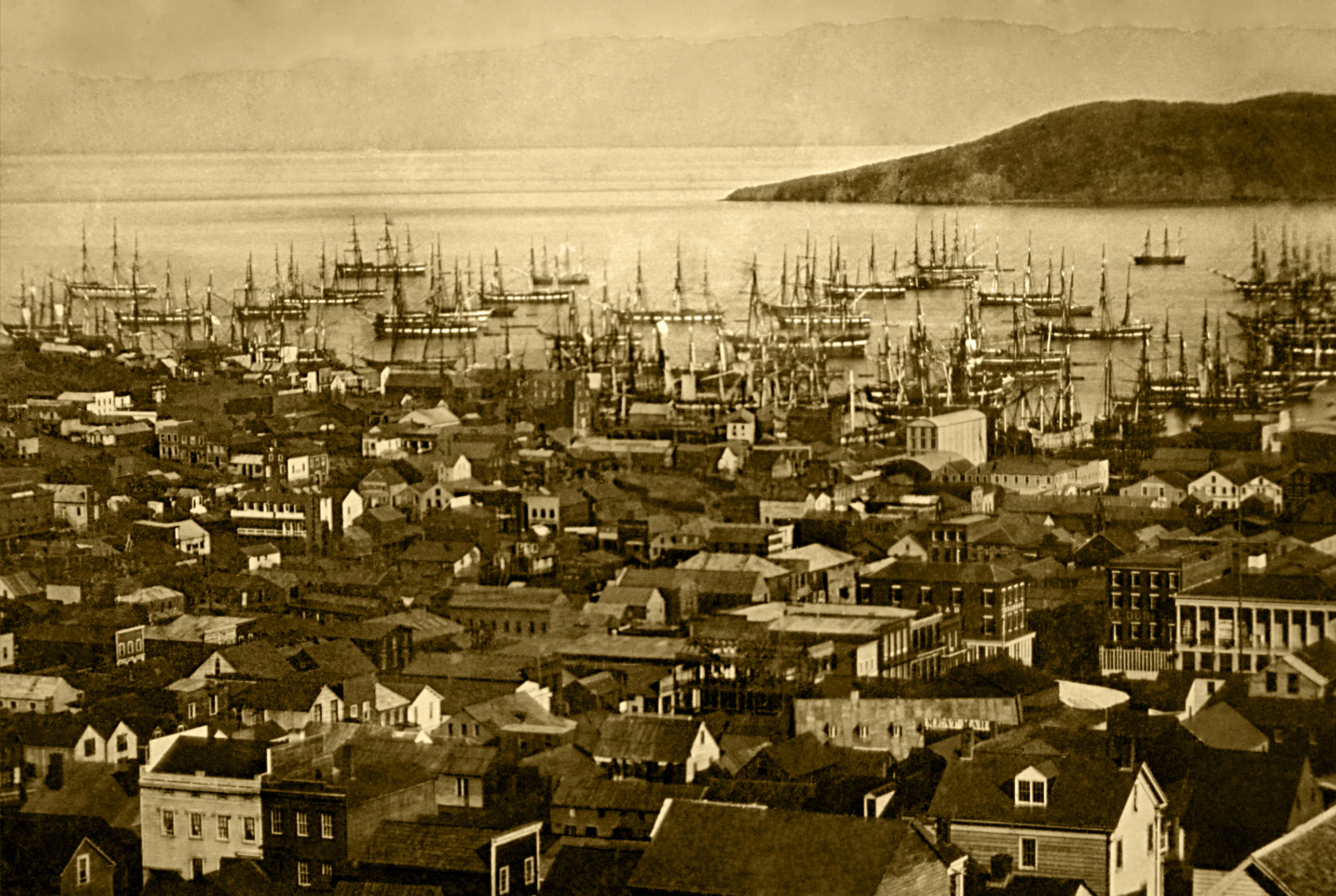
Daguerreotype view of San Francisco harbor in 1850 or 1851

The San Francisco Fire of 1851 took place from May 3 to May 4, 1851, destroying as much as three-quarters of San Francisco, California.

== History ==
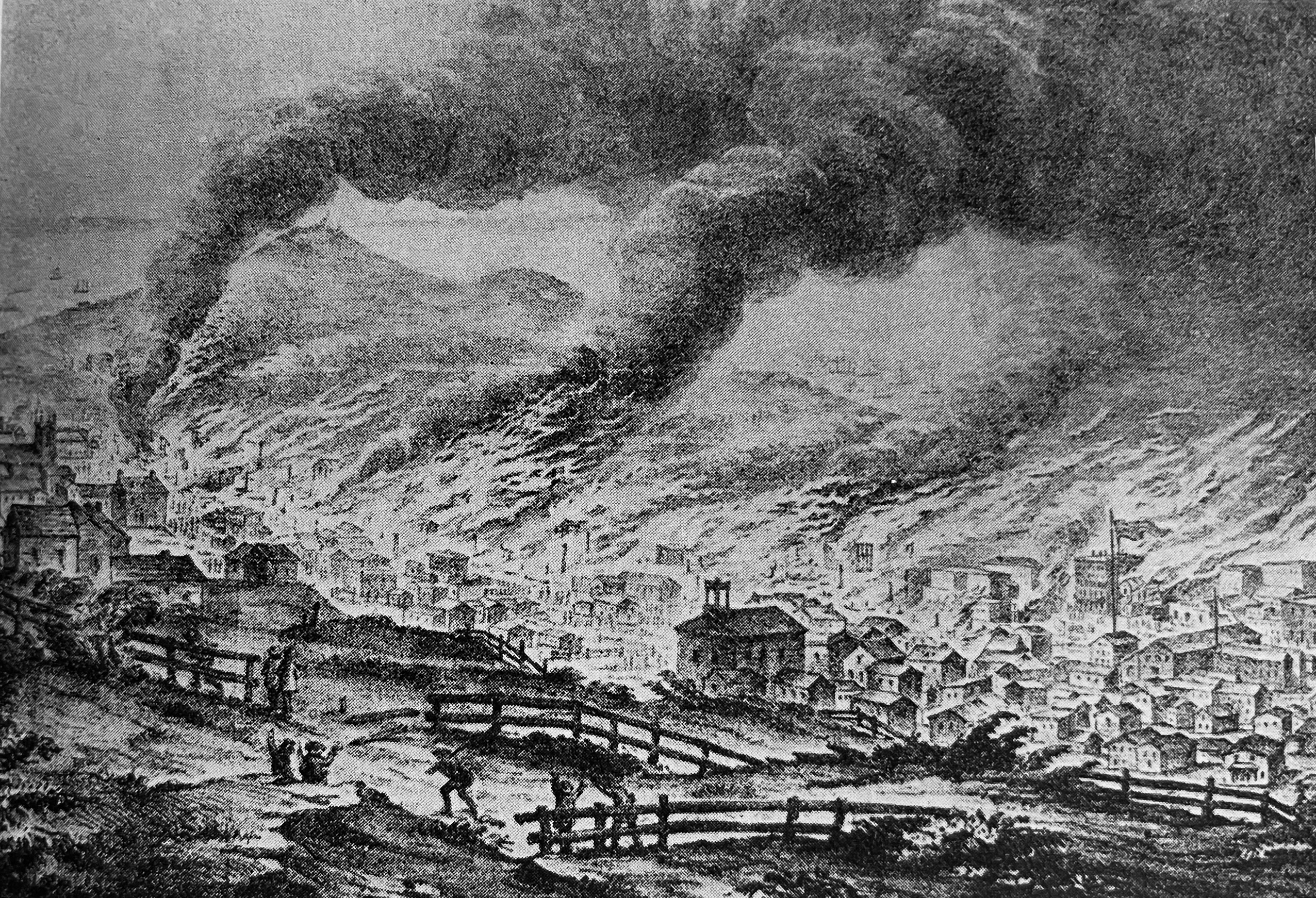
Great Conflagration In San Francisco, May 4, 1851

During the height of the California gold rush, between December 1849 and June 1851, San Francisco endured a sequence of seven severe fires, of which this was the sixth and by far the most damaging. In terms of property value, it did three times as much damage as the next most destructive of the seven fires.

Around 11 pm on the night of May 3, 1851, a fire (possibly arson) broke out in a paint and upholstery store above a hotel on the south side of Portsmouth Square in San Francisco. Fueled by increasingly high winds, the fire was initially carried down Kearny St. and then, as the winds shifted to the south, into the downtown area, where the elevated wood-plank sidewalks provided extra fuel.

The fire, which was visible for miles out to sea, continued for about 10 hours and eventually extended to at least 18 blocks of the main business district, an area three-quarters of a mile long by a third of a mile wide. Before it was checked by reaching the waterfront, it burned down some 2000 buildings altogether, amounting by some estimates to three-quarters of the city. One 19th century account of the destruction observes: "Nothing remained of the city but the sparsely settled outskirts." The total damage has been estimated at $10–12 million, a good deal of it uninsured as no insurance companies had yet been established in the city.

Among the properties destroyed that day were the Niantic whaling vessel, which had been run aground to serve as a store and would subsequently be rebuilt as a hotel; a general store founded by Domenico Ghirardelli, who would go on to found the Ghirardelli Chocolate Company; and all half dozen of the city's newspapers apart from Alta Californian.

At least nine people died in the fire, some of them in new, supposedly fireproof iron buildings whose doors and shutters expanded with the heat, trapping people inside.

A vivid description of the fire occurs in author Frank Marryat's memoir Molehills and Mountains:

“The wind was unusually high, and the flames spread in a broad sheet over the town. All efforts to arrest them were useless; houses were blown up and torn down in attempts to cut off communication; but the engines were driven back step by step, while some brave firemen fell victims to their determined opposition.

As the wind increased to a gale, the fire became beyond control; the brick buildings on Montgomery crumbled before it; and before it was arrested over 1000 houses, many of which were filled with merchandise, were left in ashes. Many people died, and the amount of property destroyed was estimated at two and a half million pounds sterling.

No conception can be formed of the grandeur of the scene, for at one time the burning district was covered by one vast sheet of flame that extended half a mile in length.”

== See also ==
- List of fires
