= Pailadzou Captanian =

Pailadzou A. Captanian or Gaptanian (Armenian: Փայլածու Ա. Գաբտանեան; 21 January 1883 – 26 May 1962) was an Armenian-American survivor of the Armenian genocide, memoirist, and poet. She is also credited with inspiring the creation of Rice-A-Roni which is based on her own recipe of Armenian pilaf.

== Life ==
Captanian was born in Merzifon, Turkey, and was a teacher in Samsun. During the Armenian Genocide in 1915, she was forced to march while pregnant from Turkey through the Syrian desert to Aleppo. Her husband was killed in the genocide. She named her baby son Tzavag, which means sorrow or pain in Armenian. She was one of the few survivors of the march from Samsun to Aleppo.

After the Genocide, she wrote her memoirs, which were published in 1919 in a French translation, Mémoires d’une Déportée Arménienne. They are considered an important contribution to Armenian Genocide research, since they were written shortly after the events. The book contributed to Raphael Lemkin's research and his understanding of the genocide.

Also in 1919, Captanian was reunited with her two other sons whom she had entrusted to a Greek family before the deportations. In 1920, Captanian and her sons moved to the United States, where she worked as a seamstress and sewed draperies for President Franklin D. Roosevelt's home in Hyde Park, New York. In 1922 she published the Armenian original of her memoirs, Tzavag, named after the son she was carrying through her desert march. She became a U.S. citizen in 1927.

After World War II, Captanian and her family moved to San Francisco. While in San Francisco, she rented a room to Lois and Tom DeDomenico. Captanian taught Lois how to make Armenian pilaf and in 1955 Tom and his brother Vincent, who worked at the Golden Grain Macaroni pasta company founded by their father, came up with the initial recipe for the rice-and-macaroni mixture they called Rice-A-Roni.

She died in Monmouth, New Jersey, aged 80. She was survived by her sons Herant (Grant), Aram, and Tzavag (Gilbert).

== Bibliography ==
- Captanian, P. (1919). Mémoires d'une Déportée Arménienne (in French). Paris, France: Flinikowski. OCLC 80594597
- Captanian, Pailadzou A. Ցաւակ. (Yerevan: Tparan, 1922) OCLC 32764506
