= Subpar Miniature Golf =

Golf course in Almeda, California

- Location within California
- 37.80592938256447°N 122.42324070122493°W

Club information
- Location: 1511 Park St, Alameda, CA 94501; Alameda, California (2012-2018)
- Established: August 2012 (Alameda, California); October 22, 2019 (Ghirardelli Square, San Francisco, California)
- Type: Public
- Owner: Michael Taft
- Total holes: 18
- Website: http://www.subparminigolf.com/

Subpar Miniature Golf is an indoor San Francisco Bay Area-themed miniature golf course originally located on Park Street in Alameda, California and currently located on North Point Street in San Francisco, California in Ghirardelli Square as a result of a stymied effort to relocate the business to a shopping area in Alameda.

== History ==
Subpar Miniature Golf was originally opened for business in August 2012 by Michael Taft on 1511 Park Street in Alameda, California where it operated for six years before a planned move to Alameda's South Shore Center shopping complex in 2018 was blocked by Ross Dress for Less whose decision to vote against the move forced Taft, in 2019, to relocate the business to Ghirardelli Square in San Francisco, California instead. Taft, who had always planned on opening a miniature golf course hired a cadre of artist friends to design the course, creating miniaturized versions of San Francisco bay area landmarks such as the Golden Gate Bridge, Painted Ladies and Lombard Street. Taft went into debt during the development of the project, almost cancelling it three times before opening on Park Street in August 2012.
