= Hornitos, California =

Hornitos
- Census-designated place
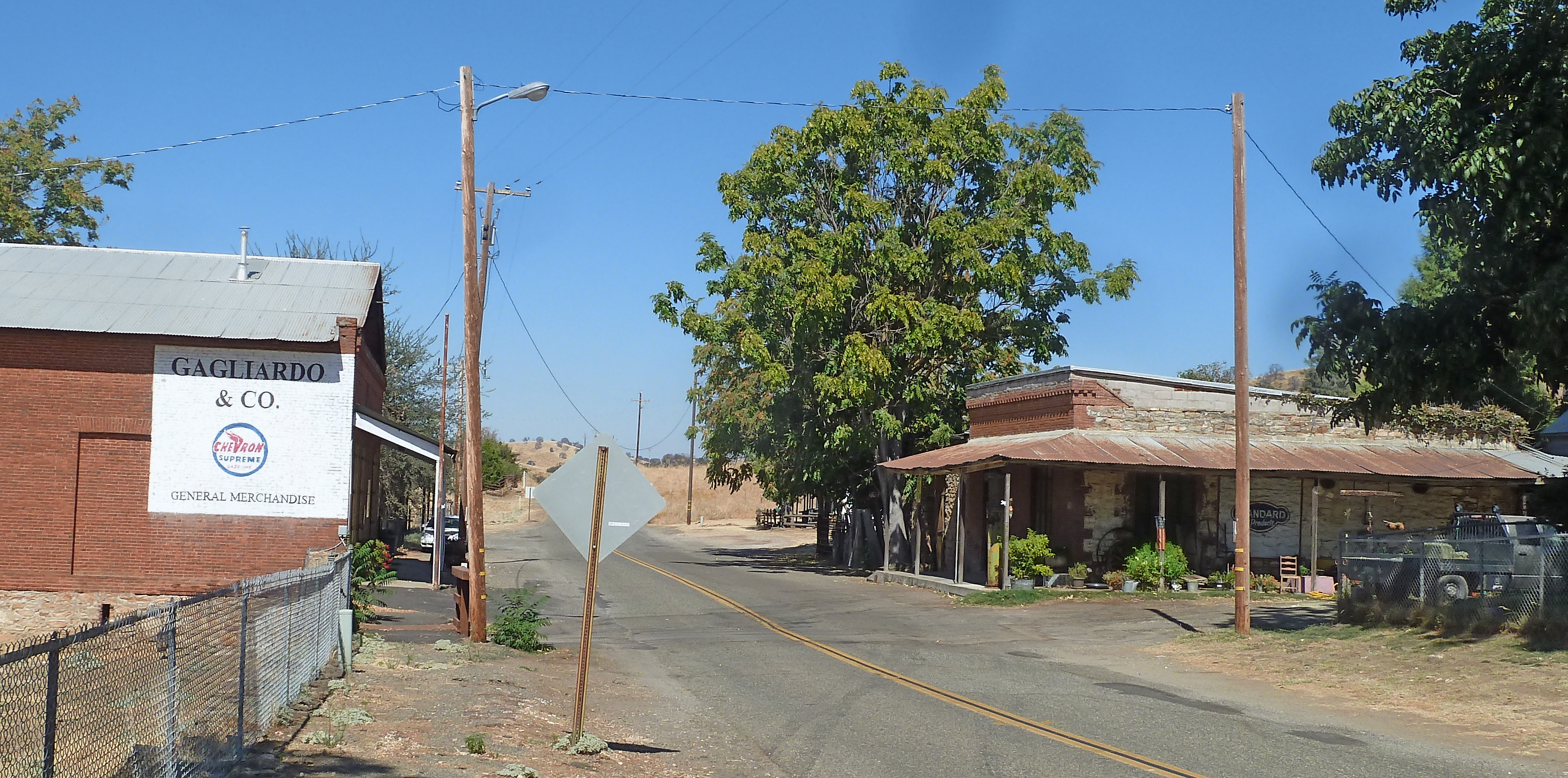
- Hornitos street view

- Location in Mariposa County, California

- Location within California Location within the United States
- Coordinates: 37°29′59″N 120°14′21″W
- Country: United States
- State: California
- County: Mariposa

Area
  - Total: 1.154 sq mi (2.99 km^{2})
  - Land: 1.154 sq mi (2.99 km^{2})
- Elevation: 840 ft (260 m)

Population (2020)
  - Total: 38
  - Density: 33/sq mi (13/km^{2})
- Time zone: UTC-8 (Pacific (PST))
  - Summer (DST): UTC-7 (PDT)
- ZIP Code: 95325
- GNIS feature IDs: 2628740

California Historical Landmark
- Reference no.: 333

Hornitos (Spanish for "Little ovens") is a census-designated place in Mariposa County, California, United States. It is located on Burns Creek 25 miles (40 km) by road south of Coulterville, at an elevation of 843 feet (257 m). The population was 38 at the 2020 census, down from 75 at the 2010 census.

== History ==
The Hornitas post office opened in 1856 and changed its name to Hornitos in 1877. The name, meaning "little ovens" in Spanish, was derived from the community's old Mexican tombstones that were built in the shape of little square bake ovens. Hornitos is registered as California Historical Landmark #333.

Domingo Ghirardelli had a general store here between 1856 and 1859, where he perfected his chocolate recipes. The remains of the store can still be seen in town.

Hornitos was disincorporated by state statute in 1973.

== Geography ==
Hornitos is in western Mariposa County, 18 miles (29 km) west of Mariposa, the county seat, and 31 miles (50 km) northeast of Merced. According to the United States Census Bureau, the CDP covers an area of 1.15 square miles (3.0 km^{2}), all land. Burns Creek flows through the center of town, running southwest to join Bear Creek, a tributary of the San Joaquin River, in Merced County.

== Demographics ==
Historical population
| Census | Pop. | Note | %± |
|---|---|---|---|
| 2010 | 75 | | — |
| 2020 | 38 | | −49.3% |
U.S. Decennial Census; 1850–1870 1880-1890; 1900 1910 1920; 1930 1940 1950; 1960 1970 1980; 1990 2000 2010

Hornitos first appeared as a census-designated place in the 2010 United States census.

The 2010 United States census reported that Hornitos had a population of 75. The population density was 64.3 inhabitants per square mile (24.8/km^{2}). The racial makeup of Hornitos was 66 (88.0%) White, 0 (0.0%) African American, 2 (2.7%) Native American, 1 (1.3%) Asian, 0 (0.0%) Pacific Islander, 0 (0.0%) from other races, and 6 (8.0%) from two or more races. Hispanic or Latino of any race were 5 persons (6.7%).

The Census reported that 75 people (100% of the population) lived in households, 0 (0%) lived in non-institutionalized group quarters, and 0 (0%) were institutionalized.

There were 34 households, out of which 7 (20.6%) had children under the age of 18 living in them, 15 (44.1%) were opposite-sex married couples living together, 3 (8.8%) had a female householder with no husband present, 1 (2.9%) had a male householder with no wife present. There were 1 (2.9%) unmarried opposite-sex partnerships, and 0 (0%) same-sex married couples or partnerships. 12 households (35.3%) were made up of individuals, and 8 (23.5%) had someone living alone who was 65 years of age or older. The average household size was 2.21. There were 19 families (55.9% of all households); the average family size was 3.00.

The population was spread out, with 14 people (18.7%) under the age of 18, 2 people (2.7%) aged 18 to 24, 17 people (22.7%) aged 25 to 44, 20 people (26.7%) aged 45 to 64, and 22 people (29.3%) who were 65 years of age or older. The median age was 52.3 years. For every 100 females, there were 97.4 males. For every 100 females age 18 and over, there were 110.3 males.

There were 43 housing units at an average density of 36.9 per square mile (14.2/km^{2}), of which 17 (50.0%) were owner-occupied, and 17 (50.0%) were occupied by renters. The homeowner vacancy rate was 0%; the rental vacancy rate was 10.5%. 40 people (53.3% of the population) lived in owner-occupied housing units and 35 people (46.7%) lived in rental housing units.
