= Domingo Ghirardelli =

Italian-American businessman

Domenico Ghirardelli
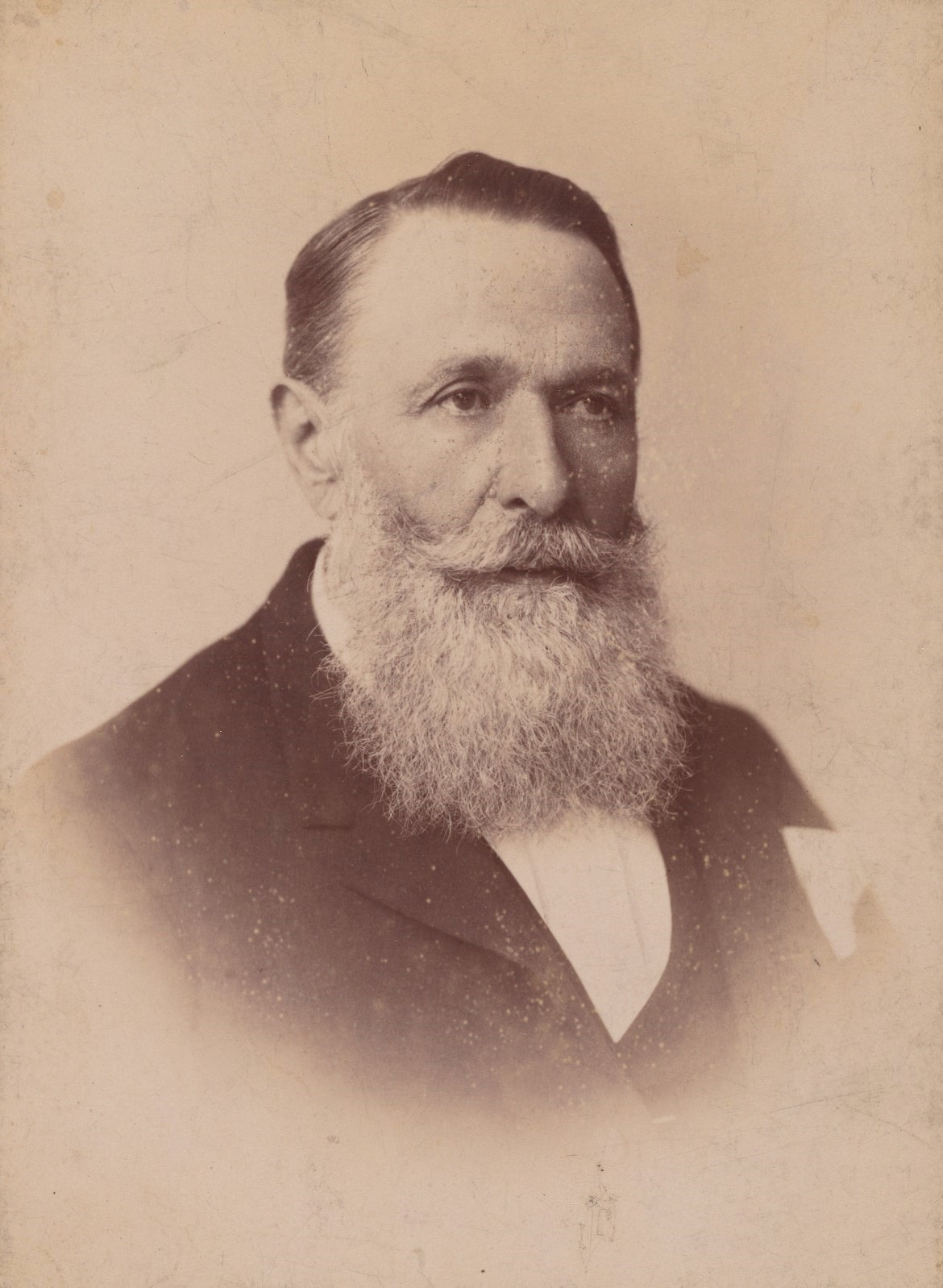
- Born: Domenico Ghirardelli; February 21, 1817; Rapallo, Genoa, Kingdom of Sardinia
- Died: January 17, 1894 (aged 76); Rapallo, Genoa, Kingdom of Italy
- Burial place: Mountain View Cemetery, Oakland, California
- Monuments: Ghirardelli Square, San Francisco
- Education: Stefano Romanengo, Genoa
- Occupation: Chocolatier
- Known for: Founding the Ghirardelli Chocolate Company
- Spouses: Elisabetta Corsini (m. 1837; died 1846); Carmen Alvarado Martín (m. 1847; died 1887)
- Children: 8

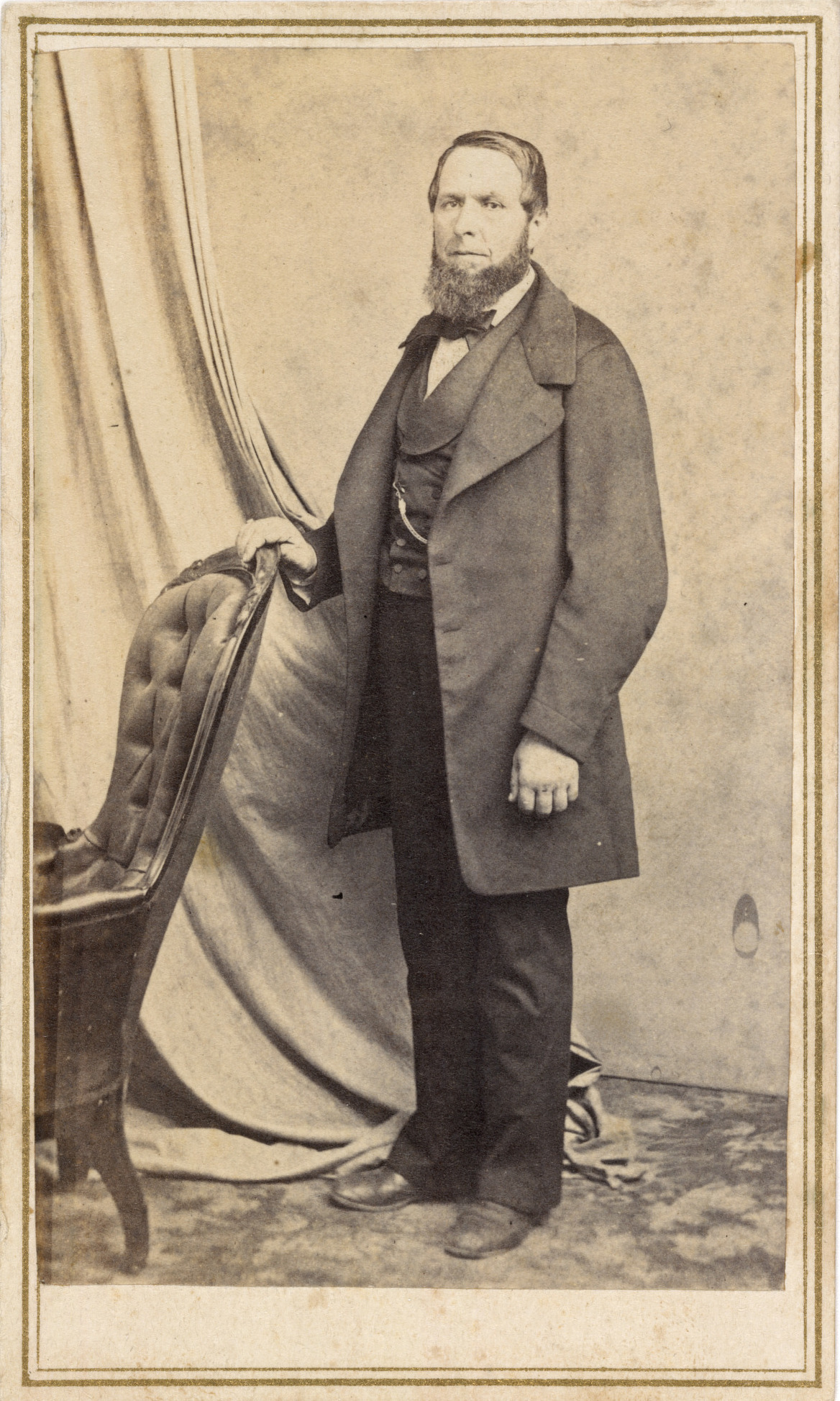
Ghirardelli in San Francisco, c. 1862

Domenico "Domingo" Ghirardelli (English: /ˌɡɪrərˈdɛli/ GHIRR-ər-DEL-ee, Italian: [doˈmeːniko doˈmiŋɡo ɡirarˈdɛlli]; February 21, 1817 – January 17, 1894) was an Italian-born chocolatier who was the founder of the Ghirardelli Chocolate Company in San Francisco, California.

== Early life, family and education ==
Domenico Ghirardelli was born on February 21, 1817, in Rapallo, then part of the Kingdom of Sardinia, to Maddalena (née Ferretto) and Giuseppe Ghirardelli. His father was a spice merchant in nearby Genoa. In his teens, he apprenticed at Romanengo, a noted chocolatier in Genoa.

In 1838, at about age 20, he moved to Uruguay, then to Lima, Peru, where he established a confectionery, where he began using the Spanish equivalent of his Italian name, Domingo. In 1849, he moved to California on the recommendation of his former neighbor, James Lick, who had brought 600 lb (270 kg) of chocolate with him to San Francisco in 1848. Caught up in the California Gold Rush, he opened his first store in a mining camp to sell sweets and treats to miners who were lacking the small pleasures of life. Ghirardelli spent a few months in the gold fields near Sonora and Jamestown, before becoming a merchant in Hornitos, California.

== Career ==
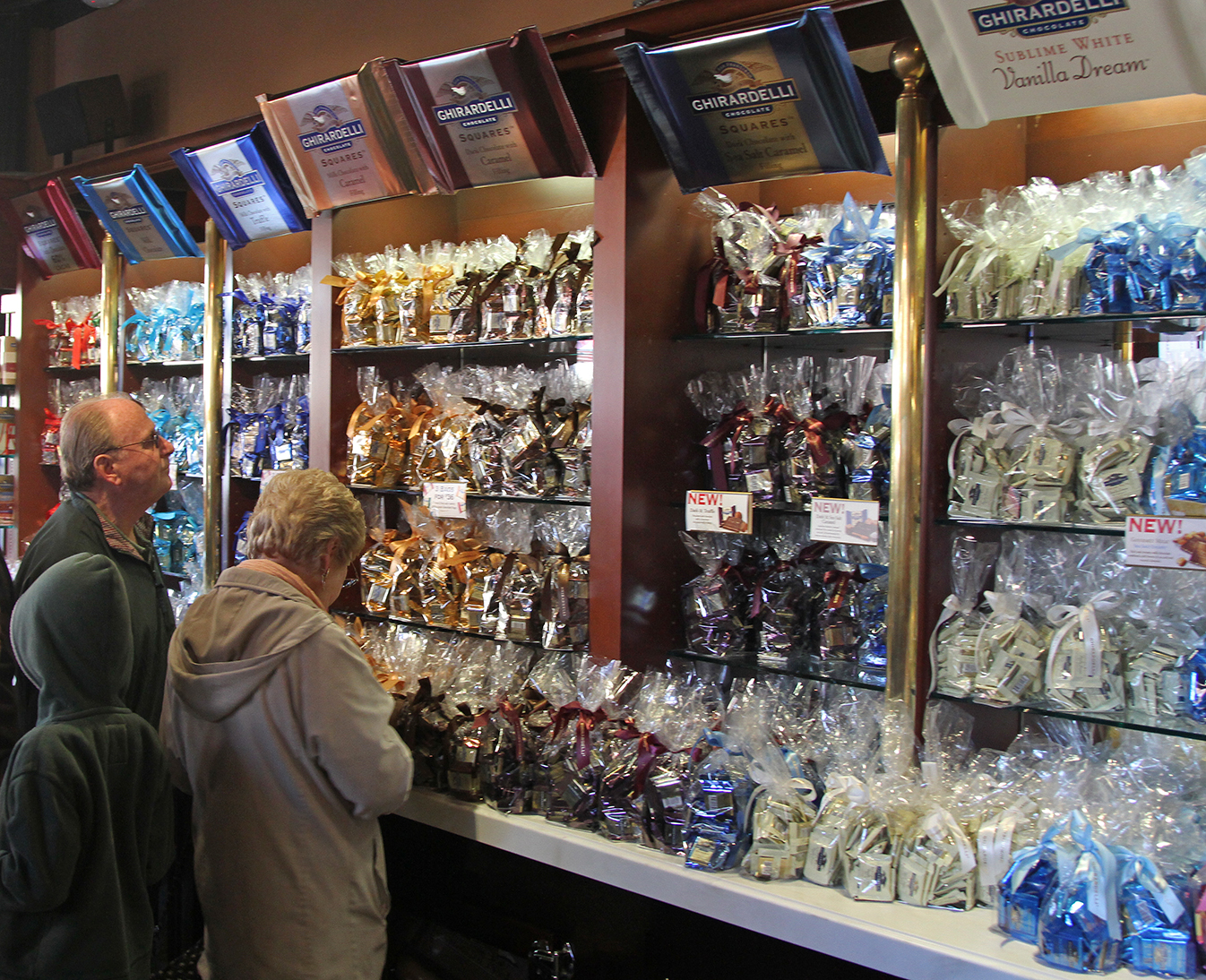
A selection of Ghirardelli's chocolate in the flagship shop at Ghirardelli Square in San Francisco, California

In 1852, Ghirardelli moved to San Francisco and established the Ghirardelli Chocolate Company at what would come to be known as Ghirardelli Square. According to the San Francisco Chronicle he is San Francisco's most successful chocolatier. Ghirardelli is America's third oldest chocolate company, and was also among the first globally (1860s) to develop and transport soluble ground chocolate for drinking and baking.

Around the year 1865, a worker at the Ghirardelli factory discovered that by hanging a bag of ground cacao beans in a warm room, the cocoa butter would drip off, leaving behind a residue that could then be converted into ground chocolate. This technique, known as the Broma process, is now the most common method used for the production of chocolate.

== Personal life and death ==
Ghirardelli married Elisabetta "Bettina" Corsini, a native of Italy like him, in 1837. She died in 1846.

He married Carmen Alvarado Martín (1830–1887) in Lima, Peru, in 1847. Her first husband had been a French physician who had been lost at sea, and she had an eight-month-old child, Carmen. He and Carmen had seven children: Virginia (1847–1867); (Note: Virginia married Angelo Mangini, and they had a daughter, Amelia, in 1863. Amelia died in 1879, leaving no heirs.) Domenico Jr. (1849–1932);; Joseph Nicholas (1852–1906); Elvira (1856–1908); Louis (1857–1902); Angela (1859–1936); and Eugene Gustave (1860–?). (Note: Historian Sidney Lawrence gives Eugene's date of birth as 1860, but Polly Ghirardelli Lawrence says none of her relatives knows Eugene's actual date of birth. Sidney Lawrence notes that Eugene married Rosa Capelli, and the couple had two sons: Angelo and Rinaldo. He goes on to say that Eugene founded an import company, E. Ghirardelli Mercantile Company, which went bankrupt in 1905. Polly Lawrence and Sidney Lawrence note that Eugene disappeared in 1909, and Sidney Lawrence says he was declared legally dead in 1921.) Carmen (the mother) died on September 18, 1887.

Ghirardelli was a Freemason, joining the San Francisco French-speaking La Parfaite Union Lodge No. 17 in 1869.

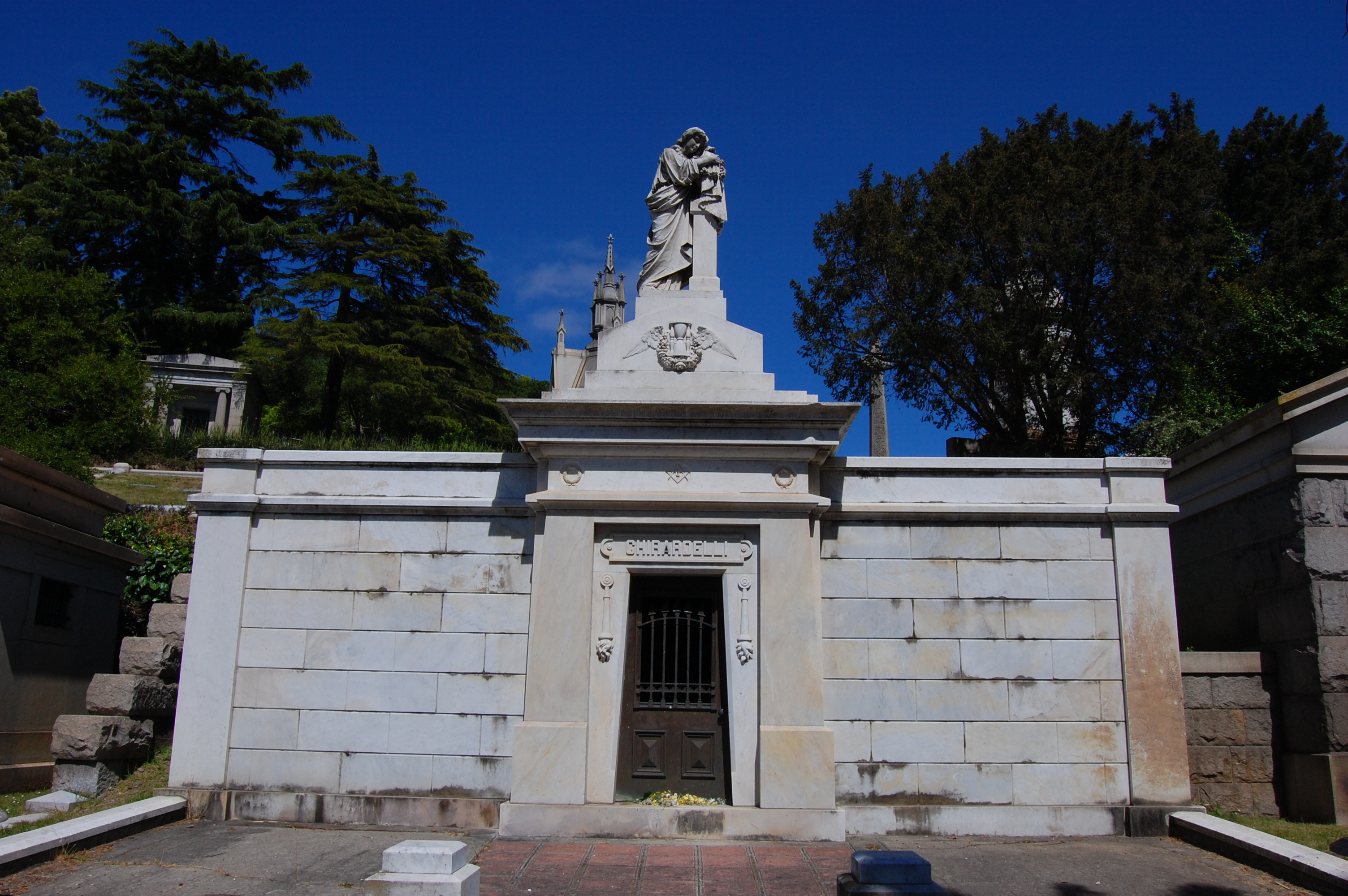
Family tomb

He died on January 17, 1894 in his native Rapallo, from influenza. His body was buried at Mountain View Cemetery in Oakland, California, along with the rest of his family.

== See also ==
- Ghirardelli Chocolate Company
- Ghirardelli Square
