= Vincent DeDomenico =

American entrepreneur

Vincent Michael DeDomenico
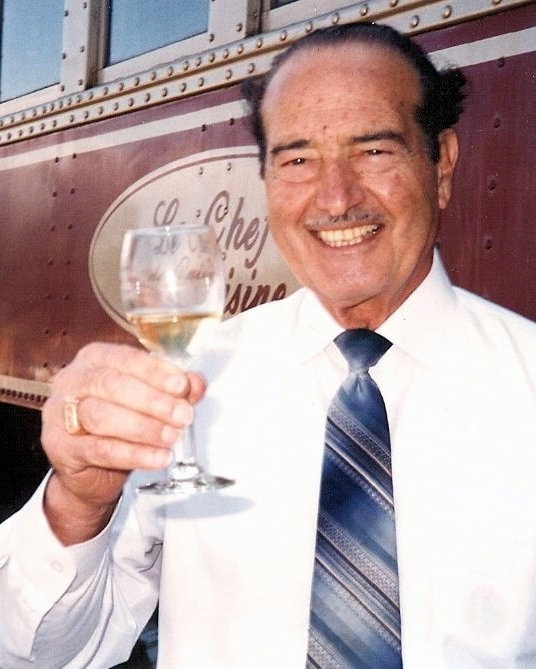
- Vincent DeDomenico
- Born: September 29, 1915; San Francisco, California, United States
- Died: October 18, 2007 (aged 92); Napa, California
- Education: Graduate, Mission High School, San Francisco, California
- Occupation: Businessman
- Employer: Golden Grain Macaroni Company
- Known for: Inventor of Rice-A-Roni; Founder of Napa Valley Wine Train
- Spouse: Mildred DeDomenico
- Children: Steven DeDomenico, Michael DeDomenico, Vicki McManus, Marla Bleecher, Vincent DeDomenico Jr.

Vincent Michael "Vince" DeDomenico, Sr. (September 29, 1915 – October 18, 2007) was an American entrepreneur, one of the inventors of Rice-A-Roni, and a founder of the Napa Valley Wine Train.

== Biography ==
DeDomenico was born in San Francisco, California and raised in the city's Mission District. He graduated from Mission High School, and took some business and accounting classes at Golden Gate University (then known as Golden Gate College). Because his family did not have enough money for a full college education, he began working for the family business, the Gragnano Macaroni Factory, immediately after graduating. When his father died in 1933 he and his brothers took over the business, now called Golden Grain Macaroni Company. He and his brothers invented the dried rice mixture Rice-A-Roni in 1958.

In 1964 DeDomenico bought San Francisco Ghirardelli Chocolate Company, and built the company to the status of a world-famous chocolatier. The DeDomenicos sold both companies to the Quaker Oats Company in 1986 for $300 million.

The next year, Vincent DeDomenico, at the age of 72, joined two other investors, Jack Hussey and Dr. Lee Block, who had purchased the right of way to an 1864 Southern Pacific rail line in Napa Valley, California. DeDomenico and his wife had ridden the Orient Express, and had a vision of creating a comparable level of wine, food, and luxury for rail passengers in California. He took over the project and won approval to use the line for the new tourism venture, the Napa Valley Wine Train, after years of local opposition. The wine train began operation in 1989. It now carries 100,000 passengers per year and is credited in part with initiating the rise of downtown Napa, California as a tourism destination, despite constant litigation over flood control, increased congestion, and other issues that continues as of 2007. On the 10th anniversary of the train's operation, DeDomenico was honored with the Walter E. Disney Railroader Award by the Carolwood Pacific Historical Society for restoring and preserving the vintage train.

In later years DeDomenico operated a ranch in the Sacramento Valley. He went to work until the day that he died, dying quietly in his sleep after a full day at the wine train office. DeDomenico was married to Mildred DeDomenico for over 60 years, until his death. DeDemenico was described by friends and adversaries as a persistent and tough businessman, but quiet and courteous in private. A private family man, DeDomenico enjoyed 1-2 glasses of wine per day.

DeDomenico's wife, Mildred, died on November 26, 2007, five weeks after his death.
