= Rice-A-Roni =

Pilaf-like boxed food mix

Rice-A-Roni Pasta Roni

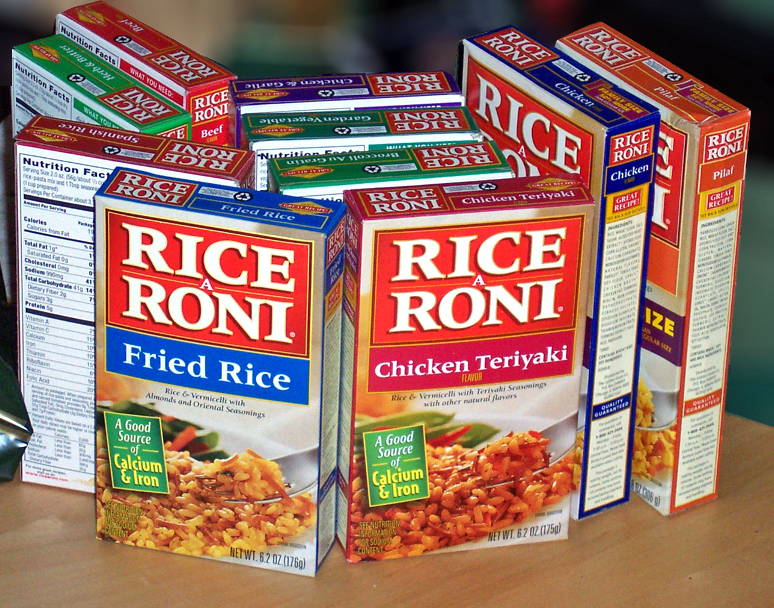
- Product type: Flavored rice, pasta mixes
- Current owner: Quaker Oats Company
- Country: United States
- Introduced: 1958; 68 years ago
- Markets: U.S.
- Previous owners: Golden Grain Macaroni Company
- Tagline: "The San Francisco Treat"
- Website: ricearoni.com

Rice-A-Roni (a portmanteau of rice and macaroni) is an American boxed food mix that consists of rice, vermicelli pasta, and seasonings. To prepare, the rice and pasta are browned in butter, then water and seasonings are added and simmered until absorbed. It is a product of Quaker Oats Company, a subsidiary of PepsiCo.

== History ==
In 1890, Italian-born immigrant Domenico DeDomenico moved to California, where he established a fresh produce store. A successful businessman, he married Maria Ferrigno from Salerno, Italy. Back home, her family owned a pasta factory, so in 1912 she persuaded him to establish a similar business in the Mission District of San Francisco. The enterprise was "Gragnano Products, Inc." It delivered pasta to Italian stores and restaurants in the area.

DeDomenico's sons, Vince (1915–2007), Tom, Paskey, and Anthony, worked with him. In 1934, Paskey changed the name to "Golden Grain Macaroni Company". Tom's wife, Lois, was inspired by the pilaf recipe she received from Armenian immigrant Pailadzo Captanian, to create a dish of rice and macaroni, which she served at a family dinner. In 1958, Vince invented Rice-A-Roni by adding a dry chicken soup mix to rice and macaroni. It was introduced in 1958 in the Northwestern United States and went nationwide three years later. Because of its origins, it was called "The San Francisco Treat!" It is loosely based on the Levantine pilaf dish rizz bi-sha'riyya.

After a trip to Italy in 1964, Vince returned with the idea for "Noodle Roni Parmesano", based on Fettuccine Alfredo. As the product line extended with other shapes and sauces it was renamed from Noodle Roni to Pasta Roni in 1995. In 1986, Quaker Oats Company purchased the Golden Grain Company from the DeDomenico family. In 2001, the Quaker Oats Company was purchased by PepsiCo.

American Italian Pasta Company bought the Golden Grain brand in 2003, but the sale did not include Rice-A-Roni, which remained with the Quaker Oats division of PepsiCo.

Rice-a-Roni markets low-sodium versions of its primary products. The company has marketed a line of products with brown rice.

In 2024, a third line of products called Mac-A-Roni was released in cheddar and white cheddar flavors.

== See also ==
- Reissa roni, an insect named after the product
