= Yosemite Park and Curry Company =

Park concessionaire from 1925 to 1993

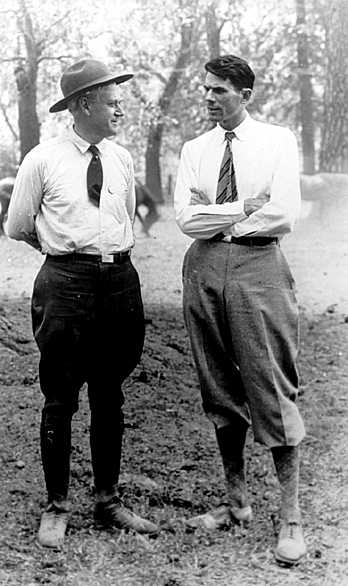
- Stephen Mather and Donald Tresidder at the site of the Ahwahnee Hotel.
- Company type: Private
- Industry: Hospitality management
- Founded: 1925
- Founder: Donald Tresidder
- Headquarters: Yosemite National Park, U.S.
- Area served: Yosemite National Park
- Key people: David A. Curry and Jennie Curry (Co-Founders); D. J. Desmond; Mary Curry Tressider
- Services: Parks & Resorts; Travel Hospitality

The Yosemite Park and Curry Company (YP&CC), one of the longest-operating concessioners in the National Park System, played a pivotal role in shaping the visitor experience at Yosemite National Park as its chief concessionaire from 1925 to 1993. Formed through the merger of two major park concessionaires, Yosemite National Park Company and Curry Camping Company, YP&CC set key precedents for national park operations. YP&CC's contributions, including the development of winter sports, cultural events, recreational facilities, and the luxury Ahwahnee Hotel, helped establish Yosemite as a premier tourist destination and influenced tourism infrastructure across national parks.

== History ==
=== Formation and Early Years ===
The Yosemite Park and Curry Company (YP&CC) was formed through the merger of the Yosemite National Park Company and the Curry Camping Company. This merger was part of a decade-long initiative by National Park Service Director Stephen Mather to streamline operations within Yosemite National Park for improved service and efficiency. The merger, involving properties valued at $2.5 million, was approved by Secretary of the Interior Hubert Work and Mather, and was considered timely due to the anticipated increase in tourism from a new all-year road that was being built to Yosemite.

The merger combined key operations such as the Yosemite Transportation System, hotels, stores, and garages in the park, such as the Glacier Point Hotel, Wawona Hotel, and Camp Curry. A.B.C. Dohrmann, president of the Yosemite National Park Company, became the chairman of the new board, with Donald Tresidder of the Curry Camping Company serving as president and general manager. The merger created the largest tourism operation of its kind. By 1947, approximately 1,250 people were employed during the summer months.

=== Expansion and Acquisitions ===
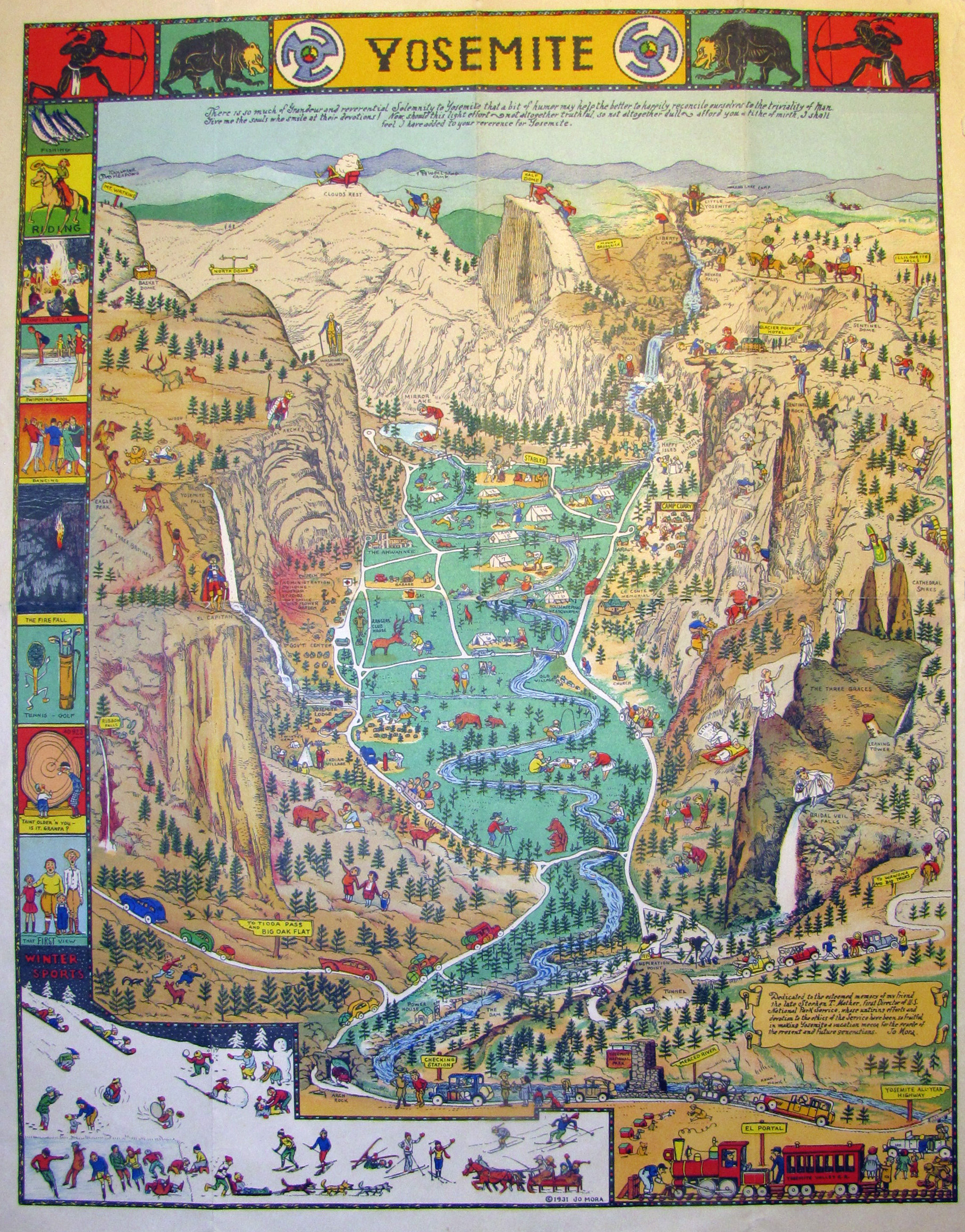
1931 visitor map featuring depictions of Yosemite's scenery, buildings, and activities, printed by the Yosemite Park and Curry Company.

YP&CC also played a pivotal role in the development of the Ahwahnee Hotel, which was conceived in the 1920s to provide luxury accommodations in the park. In 1925, as YP&CC consolidated its operations, it took control of the hotel's development and partnered with architect Arthur Brown Jr. to design the structure and Phyllis Ackerman to design the interior. The hotel, which opened in 1927, combined Native American, Art Deco, and Arts and Crafts design elements, establishing it as one of the most distinctive and luxurious hotels in the national park system.

The Ahwahnee Hotel became a symbol of Yosemite's dedication to attracting upscale visitors, further solidifying the park's status as a premier destination for high-end tourism.

YP&CC purchased the Degnan Family's Valley concession, founded in 1898, in 1974.

=== Winter Sports and Recreation ===
YP&CC played a significant role in the development of winter sports at Yosemite. In 1935, the company completed the construction of Badger Pass Ski Lodge, which became California's first downhill ski area. YP&CC also founded the Yosemite Winter Club and introduced the iconic Bracebridge Dinner, a seasonal event started in 1927 that became a hallmark of Yosemite's cultural offerings.

Additionally, YP&CC expanded the High Sierra Camps, which offered guided camping trips in the park's backcountry, and founded the Yosemite Mountaineering School in 1969 to promote climbing and outdoor recreation.

=== Ownership Changes and Final Years ===
YP&CC remained a family-controlled corporation until the death of Mary Curry Tressider in 1970. Following several ownership changes, MCA, Inc. took control of the company in 1973. In 1993, the National Park Service awarded a 15-year concession contract to Delaware North, effectively ending YP&CC's decades-long operation under the Curry family. The company was renamed Yosemite Concession Services.

== See also ==
- Yosemite Lodge
- Curry Village
- Badger Pass Ski Area
- Bracebridge Dinner
