= Yosemite National Park trademarks dispute =

US intellectual property dispute

In 1993, Delaware North became the provider of visitor services at Yosemite National Park under contract with the National Park Service, via the subsidiary DNC Parks and Resorts at Yosemite, Inc.

When the contract was acquired by Aramark in 2015, it was required to purchase the assets of the previous concessionaire—just as Delaware North was required to before. However, Delaware North claimed that the sale did not include its intellectual property, which included trademarks for various place names in the park, and valued them at $51 million. Delaware North sued the United States in the Court of Federal Claims in 2015. The NPS disputed the cost of these intangible assets, as well as Delaware North having registered the marks in the first place. Upon Aramark's transition to concessionaire in March 2016, the trademarked place names were replaced by alternative names.

In July 2019, Delaware North reached a roughly $12 million settlement, under which the original place names would be restored, and Delaware North agreed to return the trademarks to the NPS upon the conclusion of Aramark's contract.

== Background ==
In 2014, the United States National Park Service opened bids on a new concessions contract for Yosemite National Park's properties. When Delaware North assumed the role of concessionary in 1993, it was contractually required to purchase the assets of the previous concessionaire — Yosemite Park & Curry Company — at fair market value, including furniture, equipment, vehicles, and "other property". Its ultimate successor, Aramark subsidiary Yosemite Hospitality, LLC (who was awarded a 15-year contract), would be subject to similar terms. Intellectual property was not explicitly listed in the contract; this includes trademarks that were registered by Delaware North, including place names such as "Yosemite National Park", Ahwahnee, Badger Pass, Curry Village, Yosemite Lodge, and the slogan "Go climb a rock".

In 2015, Delaware North sued the NPS in the United States Court of Claims for breach of contract, claiming that the NPS did not cause the intellectual property to be sold to Aramark, and demanded a payment from Aramark for the property, to be determined in court. Delaware North initially asserted the fair market value of its intangible properties to be $51 million. The National Park Service estimated the value of the intangible assets at $3.5 million, and also suggested that the marks should not have been filed for by Delaware North to begin with.

At the request of Delaware North, the National Park Service had amended the bid notice to explicitly mention intellectual property, again without specifying trademarks. The park service contended that the intellectual property includes assets such as websites and customer databases, but not the trademarks. Delaware North claimed to have offered to temporarily license the trademarks while the dispute is resolved, but that the government did not respond. The Park Service said that accepting the offer could be seen as acknowledging the legitimacy of the trademarks.

== Name changes ==
In January 2016, it was announced that due to the legal dispute, properties at Yosemite National Park would be renamed effective March 1, 2016, when Aramark's contract officially began. The Ahwahnee was renamed the Majestic Yosemite Hotel, Camp Curry was renamed Half Dome Village, the Yosemite Lodge became Yosemite Valley Lodge, the Wawona Hotel became Big Tree Lodge, and the Badger Pass Ski Area became the Yosemite Ski & Snowboard Area.

== Resolution ==
On July 15, 2019, Delaware North and the Park Service announced that they had settled the lawsuit, and that the original names would be reinstated; the government paid $3.84 million to Delaware North, and Aramark paid $8.16 million. Delaware North agreed to turn over tangible assets that had not yet been transferred to Aramark, and return the Yosemite-related trademarks to the Park Service at no cost following the conclusion of Aramark's concessions contract.

== See also ==
- Geographical indication
