= Donald Tresidder =

Donald Bertrand Tresidder
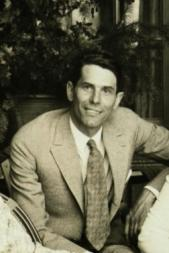
- Donald Tresidder in front of the Ahwahnee Hotel, Yosemite National Park, California

4th President of Stanford University
- In office October 14, 1943 – January 28, 1948
- Preceded by: Ray Lyman Wilbur
- Succeeded by: Alvin C. Eurich (acting); Wallace Sterling

Personal details
- Born: April 7, 1894 Tipton, Indiana, U.S.
- Died: January 28, 1948 (aged 53) New York City, U.S.
- Spouse: Mary Curry (m. 1920)
- Education: Stanford University (AB, MD)
- Profession: Businessman, academic

Donald Bertrand Tresidder (April 7, 1894 – January 28, 1948) was an American businessman and physician who served as the fourth president of Stanford University from 1943 until his death in 1948. He had a longstanding association with Yosemite National Park.

== Early life ==
Donald Bertrand Tresidder was born on April 7, 1894, in Tipton, Indiana. He was the only son of John Treloar Tresidder, a prominent physician who was born in Cornwall, and Sarah Daum.

== Yosemite ==
At the age of 20, Tresidder took a trip with his sister to Southern California, but due to washed-out railroad tracks, they ended up visiting Yosemite Valley instead. During his time there, he had the opportunity to meet several faculty members from Stanford University, who convinced him to enroll at the university.

During his visit to Yosemite, Tresidder also met his future wife, Mary Curry, the daughter of David and Jennie Curry, who were the owners of Camp Curry. Tresidder spent his summers working in Yosemite, taking on various jobs such as a porter, among others. However, he was briefly fired for taking his future wife rock climbing on the backside of Half Dome. Tresidder and Mary Curry got married on June 17, 1920.

After graduating from Stanford, Tresidder became the president of Yosemite Park and Curry Company. During his tenure, he oversaw the construction of new roads, the establishment of the Badger Pass Ski Area, and the Ahwahnee Hotel, which was built in 1927 and is now recognized as a National Historic Landmark.

For many years, Tresidder assumed the role of the Squire at the Bracebridge Dinner, a grand Christmas feast held annually on Christmas Day at the Ahwahnee Hotel in Yosemite. His wife, Mary Curry Tresidder, played the role of Lady Bracebridge. In 1929, Tresidder invited photographer Ansel Adams to take over as the director of the Dinner, a responsibility that Adams willingly accepted.

== Stanford ==
Tresidder later described himself on arrival at Stanford as an undergraduate: "a gangling youth from the Midwest, wearing a jacket with sleeves too short to cover his long arms, shambling nervously up Palm Drive carrying a battered suitcase. But each student he passed waved and spoke to him cheerfully. At last he encountered President (David Starr) Jordan. The president tipped his broadbrimmed hat, bowed and greeted the young man from Indiana. Tresidder never forgot that welcome."

He earned his M.D. from Stanford Medical School in San Francisco; however, he never practiced medicine. While attending medical school he was a member of Phi Chi medical fraternity.

While serving as president of the Yosemite concession, he was active as a Stanford supporter, raising funds and serving as co-chair of the 50th anniversary celebration. In 1942 he became president of the Stanford board of trustees. When Stanford president Ray Lyman Wilbur retired, he took over as president.

He served as president of Stanford from 1943 until 1948 and brought the school through the difficult years of World War II. He often said that his main job at Stanford was fundraising for the school. Tresidder set up a professional fundraising organization and streamlined administrative and accounting practices. He established a scholarship program and upgraded the music program to a full department. Tresidder also abolished the sorority system on campus in 1944, after female students voted to support the move, saying there was "serious disunity" between women who pledged sororities and women who lived in dormitories.

Tresidder also helped establish the Stanford Research Institute. The organization's first director, William F. Talbot, was initially instructed by Tresidder to avoid work that would conflict with the university's interests, particularly federal contracts that might attract political pressure. The drive to find work and the lack of support from Stanford University faculty caused the new research institute to violate this directive six months later through the pursuit of a contract with the Office of Naval Research. As a result, Talbot was fired and replaced by Jesse Hobson, who had previously led the Armour Research Foundation, but the pursuit of contract work remained.

Tresidder died of a heart attack at The St. Regis Hotel in New York City on January 28, 1948, while on University business.

== Recognition ==
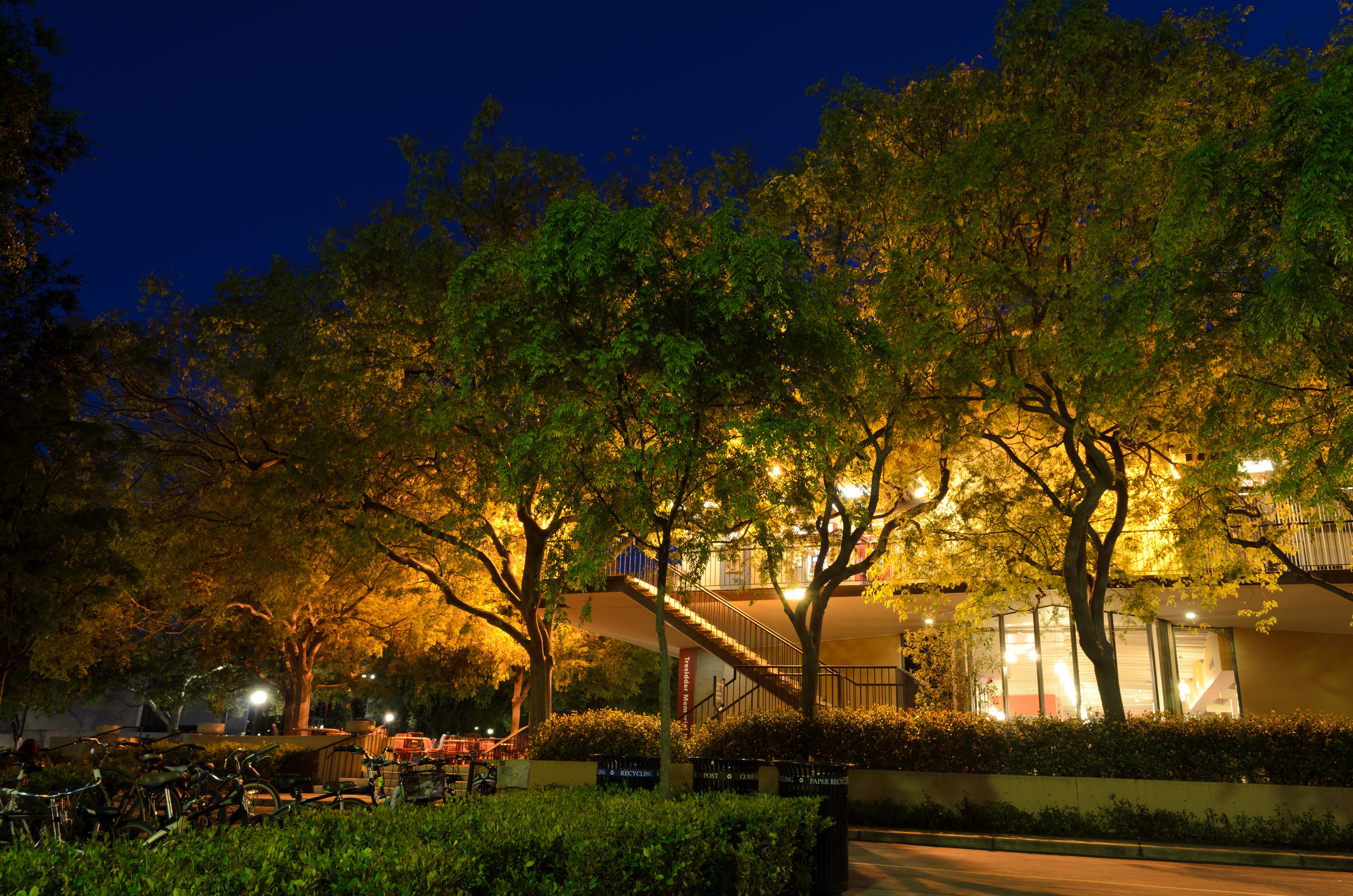
The Tresidder Memorial Union at Stanford University.

- Tresidder Peak in Yosemite National Park is named for him.
- The Tresidder Memorial Union at Stanford University, dedicated in 1962, is named for him.
- The Tresidder Bollards, also at Stanford University, are named for him.
- The Ahwahnee Hotel in Yosemite has a Mary Curry Tresidder suite and an Underwood/Tresidder suite which incorporates the Tresidder Library.

Academic offices
Preceded by Ray L. Wilbur	President of Stanford University; 1943–1948	Succeeded by Alvin C. Eurich (Acting)
