= Charles Punchard Jr. =

American landscape architect and landscape engineer

- Born: Charles Pierpont Punchard Jr. June 3, 1885; Framingham, Massachusetts, United States
- Died: November 12, 1920 (aged 35); Denver, Colorado, United States
- Occupation: Architect
- Projects: Yosemite Village (1918–1919)

Charles Pierpont "Punch" Punchard Jr. (June 3, 1885 – November 12, 1920) was an American landscape architect and landscape engineer. He was employed by the National Park Service from 1918 to 1920 where he became a pioneer in the form of "rustic architecture" that became known as "National Park Service rustic" architecture.

== Early years ==
Punchard was born in 1885 in Framingham, Massachusetts. His parents were Charles P. Punchard Sr., and Mattie Frost (Blanchard) Purchard. He attended high school in Brookline, Massachusetts. At age 16, he became employed by his uncle, William H. Punchard, Landscape Architect. He remained in the employ of his uncle for eight years. At the time of the 1910 U.S. Census, he was living in Boston and working as a "draughtsman" for a landscape architect.

== Landscape architecture practice ==
In approximately 1909, Punchard he established a partnership under the name Punchard & Negus. He also studied for two years at the Harvard University School of Landscape Architecture. In 1911, he established the landscape architectural firm of Evans & Punchard at Cleveland, Ohio in partnership with Frederick Noble Evans. Their practice spread to the Western United States. Punchard developed tuberculosis in April 1913 and left the practice to stay at a sanitarium at Colorado Springs, Colorado. (See Tuberculosis treatment in Colorado Springs). After a year's stay in the sanitarium, he settled in Denver, Colorado. He went into practice with Irvin J. McCary from 1916 to 1917.

== National Park Service ==
=== First Landscape Architect of the National Park Service ===
During World War I, Punchard's physical condition prevented from joining the military, but he was appointed in June 1917 as the Landscape Architect for the District of Columbia in the Office of Public Buildings and Grounds. While serving as the landscape architect for the national capital, Punchard worked with Arno B. Cammerer and Frederick Law Olmsted. The humid climate of the District of Columbia proved to be deleterious to Punchard's health. In order to allow Punchard to live in a drier climate, Cammerer arranged Punchard's transfer in July 1918 to the National Park Service as its first Landscape Engineer. Writing in Landscape Architecture, Punchard described the new position as follows:

"The problems of the Landscape Engineer of the National Park Service are many and embrace every detail which has to do with the appearance of the parks. He works in an advisory capacity to the superintendents and is responsible directly to the Director of the Service. He is a small fine arts commission in himself, for all plans of the concessioners must be submitted to him for approval as to architecture and location before they can be constructed, and he is responsible for the design of all structures of the Service the location of roads and other structures on the ground which will influence the appearance of the parks, ranger cabins, rest houses, checking stations, gateway structures, employees' cottages, comfort stations, forest improvement and vista thinning, the preservation of the timber along the park roads, the design of villages ..., the design and location of the automobile camps, and so on through the many ramifications of these problems."

=== Tour of the National Parks ===
Punchard spent the last half of 1918 and first half of 1919 touring and studying the conditions at the national parks in the Western United States. McClelland notes that he "gave special attention to the entrance to parks, the location and design of park buildings, the layout of campgrounds, and the physical appearance of lakes and roadsides." According to one account, "an apparently reinvigorated Punchard inspected most of the parks, consulting and advising superintendents, providing some sketches and working drawing, and giving in some instances 'detailed instructions on the ground,' or field supervision of maintenance and construction activities." He spent two-and-a-half months at Yellowstone National Park studying the buildings used by the park's concessionaires. Based on his recommendations, the camps and camp buildings were rearranged to make them "more attractive and more harmonious with the environment." While at Yellowstone, he also worked with representatives of the U.S. Forest Service to develop a plan for the approaches to all of the national parks in that area.

Punchard's next stops were Sequoia National Park and General Grant Grove in what later became Kings Canyon National Park where he studied the conditions and developed a comprehensive development plan. At Sequoia, he developed a naturalistic entrance and approach to the newly discovered Crystal Cave which was intended on "making it appear to the visitor that he has come upon the cave in the course of a walk along a trail." Punchard's access plan for Crystal Cave was later adopted at Carlsbad Caverns and Mammoth Caves.

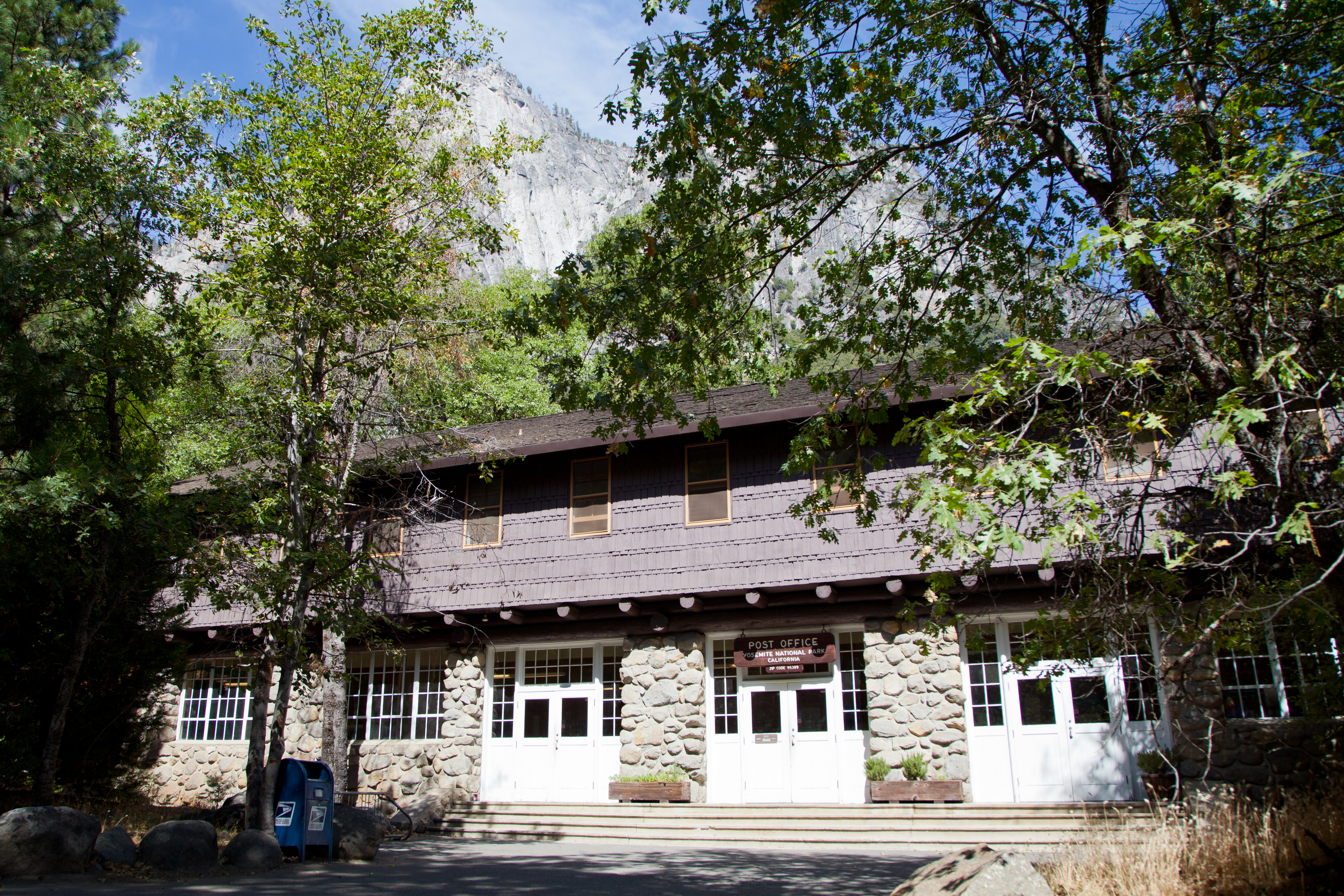
The post office building in Yosemite Village, an example of the National Park Service rustic architectural style Punchard advocated during his 1918–1919 study of the valley

Punchard then traveled to Yosemite National Park where he stayed for seven months at the end of 1918 and beginning of 1919 making a study of conditions in the Yosemite Valley. Punchard's works include Yosemite Village, where he recommended the creation of separate commercial, industrial and residential "zones," and laid out "a circuitous and irregular street pattern and called for a rustic architectural style composed of rough granite and river stones, wooden clapboard and logs." While at Yosemite, he recommended dredging silt that had built up in Mirror Lake and trimming the trees on the valley floor to create better vistas.

In the spring of 1919, Punchard visited Grand Canyon National Park. He warned that, in planning new development at the park, "too great a variety in architecture ... is going to make the place look like a jumble," and advocated adherence to the rough style of architecture employed by the railroad company in its rest houses and curio shops, or alternatively, adoption of indigenous adobe architecture.

He then traveled to Hawaii in May 1919 aboard the SS Korea Maru, conducting an inspection of a new national park in Hawaii.

Punchard also visited Mount Rainier several times and made limited observations and recommendations there. He oversaw installation of water and sewer systems at the park's campgrounds. He favored the acquisition of Longmire Springs and recommended that the springs be "walled up or confined in a neat, orderly way, and made more inviting."

=== Death ===
In June 1920, as the condition of his lungs deteriorated, Punchard died at age 35 at his home in Denver, Colorado. After his death, the Park Service ordered all flags at the Park Service throughout the country to be flown at half-mast for 30 days. Arno B. Cammerer, who later became the third Director of the National Park Service, wrote:

"'Punch' as his friends were wont to call him, made friends wherever he hung his hat. Faithful, loyal, hard-working, and energetic, he was also endowed with a fund of good common sense and rare judgment that secured for him the respect of all with whom he came in professional contact."

=== Impact and legacy ===
At the end of 1919, the first Director of the Park Service, Stephen Mather, reported that Punchard had made his office one of the "most important influences for the betterment of the national parks." Horace Albright, who later succeeded Mather as Director, wrote:

"As a Landscape Engineer Mr. Punchard occupies a position of considerable responsibility and he is consulted on all problems dealing with architectural and landscape features of the various parks. ... He devotes himself exclusively to landscape planning and general architectural work. He has no administrative functions ... His advice on landscape matters, however, must be accepted by park superintendents and the general engineer, and in order that he may be able to give this advice on the ground we have him go from park to park as occasion arises for his assistance."

Punchard was described as "a one-man art commission to assure that buildings and other proposed facilities were 'harmonious with their surroundings' and 'disturbed the natural condition of the parks' as little as possible." In her book, "Building of the National Parks," Linda Flint McClelland noted Punchard's use of "naturalistic principles" and wrote of Punchard's contribution:

"Punchard played a key role in translating the landscape policy of the National Park Service into practices that would influence the character and management of the parks. Experienced and well versed in the field, he closely studied each park and skillfully put into action plans that immediately improved its physical character. His reports and designs, furthermore, laid a solid ground, philosophically and functionally, for future landscape work."

After his death, Landscape Architecture magazine wrote that "the profession of Landscape Architecture has suffered a great loss in the untimely death of Charles P. Punchard."

== See also ==
- Architects of the National Park Service
