= Yosemite Valley, California =

Census-designated place in California, United States

Yosemite Valley
- Unincorporated community and census-designated place
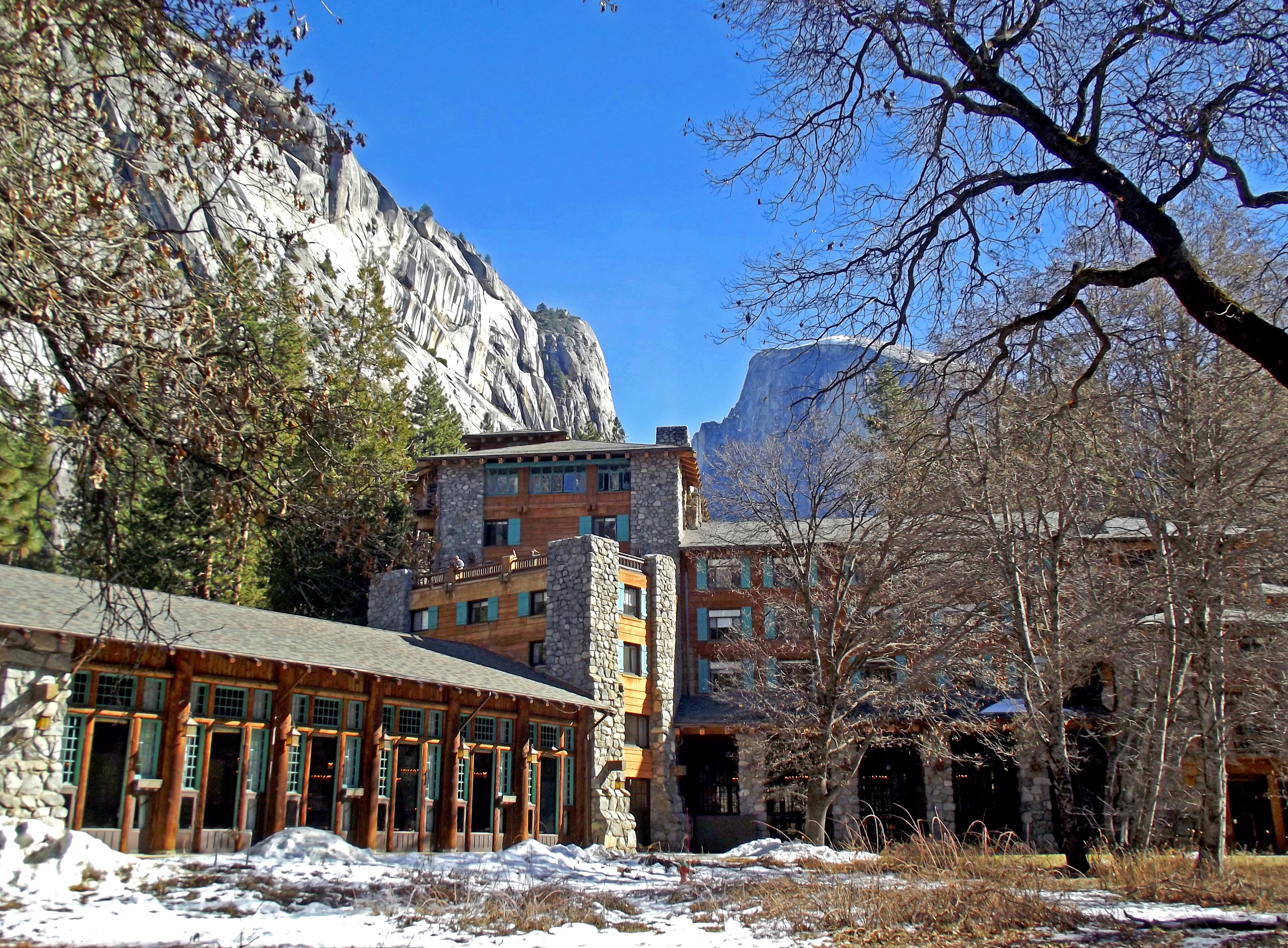
- The Ahwahnee Hotel

- Location in Mariposa County and the state of California

- Location in the United States
- Coordinates: 37°44′36″N 119°34′33″W
- Country: United States
- State: California
- County: Mariposa

Area
  - Total: 2.119 sq mi (5.488 km^{2})
  - Land: 2.058 sq mi (5.330 km^{2})
  - Water: 0.061 sq mi (0.158 km^{2}) 2.88%
- Elevation: 3,963 ft (1,208 m)

Population (2020)
  - Total: 337
  - Density: 164/sq mi (63.2/km^{2})
- Time zone: UTC−08:00 (Pacific (PST))
  - Summer (DST): UTC−07:00 (PDT)
- ZIP Code: 95389
- Area code: 209
- FIPS code: 06-86912
- GNIS feature ID: 2409638

Yosemite Valley (Yosemite, Miwok for "killer") is a census-designated place (CDP) in Mariposa County, California, United States. It consists of Yosemite Village, the main developed area, together with adjacent areas of the Yosemite Valley within Yosemite National Park. The population was 337 at the 2020 census.

Situated along the north side of the valley floor, its permanent population includes staff of the National Park Service, which administers the park, and some concession workers associated with various contracts in the park.

The village has some public facilities, such as a fire station, a post office (ZIP Code 95389), a medical clinic, a convenience store, restaurants, gift shops, and a school (kindergarten through eighth grade). The park's headquarters facilities and its main visitor center are also located here.

The Yosemite Valley Lodge is located at the west end of the village near Yosemite Falls. The Ahwahnee Hotel is a few blocks to the north. Curry Village provides tent cabins and other lodging at the east end of the valley. All three are operated by concessionaires under contract to the National Park Service. The architecture of Yosemite Village is characterized by shed style and makes extensive use of native woods. The earliest 20th-century buildings were designed by landscape architect Charles Punchard Jr., among others in the National Park Service.

== History ==
=== Native American settlement ===
The Ahwahneechee, a band of the Southern Sierra Miwok, inhabited the valley for centuries before European contact. A village called Hok-ok'-wi-dok (alternatively Hokokwito or Hococwedoc) was located opposite Yosemite Falls, at the site later occupied by the Hutchings Hotel in Yosemite Village.

=== 19th century ===
In 1855, James Mason Hutchings organized the first recreational visit to Yosemite Valley and published accounts that drew national attention to the area. In 1857, Gustavus Adolphus Hite filed a pre-emption claim in central Yosemite Valley; the following year he built a two-story hotel that was the first permanent structure in the area that became Yosemite Village. In 1864, Hutchings purchased Hite's claim and took over operation of the hotel.

That same year, Congress passed the Yosemite Grant Act, granting the valley and the Mariposa Grove of giant sequoias to the state of California to be held as public trust — an early model for what would become the national park system. The first US post office opened in 1869, originally named "Yo Semite"; the spelling was changed to "Yosemite" in 1908 and to "Yosemite National Park" in 1922. Yosemite National Park was established by Congress in 1890, reclaiming the valley from state management.

=== 20th century ===
In 1906, Major H.C. Benson was commanded to build and garrison Fort Yosemite in the valley. US Army troops were stationed there until 1916, when the National Park Service was established to administer Yosemite and other national parks. Early NPS development of Yosemite Village employed the National Park Service rustic architectural style; landscape architect Charles Punchard Jr. was among the first NPS designers to shape the village's character in the late 1910s.

== Geography ==
According to the United States Census Bureau, the community has a total area of 2.1 square miles (5.4 km^{2}), of which 0.06 square miles (0.16 km^{2}), or 2.88% are water. The Merced River flows westward through the center of the CDP.

=== Climate ===
Yosemite has a Mediterranean climate (Köppen climate classification Csa), meaning most precipitation falls during the mild winter, and the other seasons are nearly dry (less than three percent of precipitation falls during the long, hot summers). Because of orographic lift, precipitation increases with elevation up to 8,000 feet (2,400 m) where it slowly decreases to the crest. Precipitation amounts vary from 36 inches (910 mm) at 4,000 feet (1,200 m) elevation to 50 inches (1,300 mm) at 8,600 feet (2,600 m). Snow does not typically persist on the ground until November in the high country. It accumulates all winter and into March or early April.

Mean daily temperatures range from 25 °F (−4 °C) to 53 °F (12 °C) at Tuolumne Meadows at 8,600 feet (2,600 m). At the Wawona Entrance (elevation 5,130 feet or 1,560 metres), mean daily temperature ranges from 36 to 67 °F (2 to 19 °C). At the lower elevations below 5,000 feet (1,500 m), temperatures are hotter; the mean daily high temperature at Yosemite Valley (elevation 3,966 feet or 1,209 metres) varies from 46 to 90 °F (8 to 32 °C). At elevations above 8,000 feet (2,400 m), the hot, dry summer temperatures are moderated by frequent summer thunderstorms, along with snow that can persist into July. The combination of dry vegetation, low relative humidity, and thunderstorms results in frequent lightning-caused fires as well.

At the park headquarters, with an elevation of 4,018 feet (1,225 m), January averages 38.0 °F (3.3 °C), while July averages 73.3 °F (22.9 °C), though in summer the nights are much cooler than the hot days. There are an average of 45.5 days with highs of 90 °F (32 °C) or higher and an average of 105.6 nights with freezing temperatures. Freezing temperatures have been recorded in every month of the year. The record high temperature was 112 °F (44 °C) on July 22 and July 24, 1915, while the record low temperature was −7 °F (−22 °C) on January 1, 2009. Average annual precipitation is nearly 37 inches (940 mm), falling on 67 days. The wettest year was 1983 with 66.06 inches (1,678 mm) and the driest year was 1976 with 14.84 inches (377 mm). The most precipitation in one month was 29.61 inches (752 mm) in December 1955 and the most in one day was 6.92 inches (176 mm) on December 23, 1955. Average annual snowfall is 39.4 inches (1.00 m). The snowiest winter was 1948–1949 with 176.5 inches (4.48 m). The most snow in one month was 175.0 inches (4.45 m) in January 1993.

Climate data for Yosemite Park Headquarters, California, 1991–2020 normals, extremes 1905–present
Month	Jan	Feb	Mar	Apr	May	Jun	Jul	Aug	Sep	Oct	Nov	Dec	Year
Record high °F (°C)	72 (22)	82 (28)	90 (32)	96 (36)	99 (37)	103 (39)	112 (44)	110 (43)	108 (42)	98 (37)	86 (30)	73 (23)	112 (44)
Mean maximum °F (°C)	58.7 (14.8)	64.2 (17.9)	70.4 (21.3)	77.0 (25.0)	83.3 (28.5)	91.3 (32.9)	97.4 (36.3)	97.5 (36.4)	93.7 (34.3)	85.1 (29.5)	70.9 (21.6)	59.3 (15.2)	99.1 (37.3)
Mean daily maximum °F (°C)	47.5 (8.6)	51.2 (10.7)	56.7 (13.7)	63.1 (17.3)	70.5 (21.4)	80.5 (26.9)	89.2 (31.8)	89.0 (31.7)	83.0 (28.3)	70.9 (21.6)	56.0 (13.3)	45.9 (7.7)	67.0 (19.4)
Daily mean °F (°C)	38.0 (3.3)	40.7 (4.8)	45.1 (7.3)	50.4 (10.2)	57.5 (14.2)	65.8 (18.8)	73.3 (22.9)	72.9 (22.7)	67.2 (19.6)	56.1 (13.4)	44.3 (6.8)	36.8 (2.7)	54.0 (12.2)
Mean daily minimum °F (°C)	28.5 (−1.9)	30.2 (−1.0)	33.5 (0.8)	37.6 (3.1)	44.5 (6.9)	51.0 (10.6)	57.4 (14.1)	56.8 (13.8)	51.4 (10.8)	41.3 (5.2)	32.5 (0.3)	27.8 (−2.3)	41.0 (5.0)
Mean minimum °F (°C)	19.2 (−7.1)	22.0 (−5.6)	25.2 (−3.8)	28.4 (−2.0)	35.2 (1.8)	40.8 (4.9)	49.8 (9.9)	48.9 (9.4)	42.0 (5.6)	31.6 (−0.2)	25.4 (−3.7)	20.7 (−6.3)	15.7 (−9.1)
Record low °F (°C)	−7 (−22)	1 (−17)	9 (−13)	12 (−11)	15 (−9)	22 (−6)	32 (0)	32 (0)	24 (−4)	19 (−7)	10 (−12)	−1 (−18)	−7 (−22)
Average precipitation inches (mm)	6.98 (177)	6.49 (165)	5.47 (139)	3.17 (81)	1.92 (49)	0.46 (12)	0.29 (7.4)	0.16 (4.1)	0.40 (10)	1.56 (40)	4.05 (103)	5.60 (142)	36.55 (928)
Average snowfall inches (cm)	16.8 (43)	4.2 (11)	5.2 (13)	0.8 (2.0)	0.0 (0.0)	0.0 (0.0)	0.0 (0.0)	0.0 (0.0)	0.0 (0.0)	0.0 (0.0)	3.4 (8.6)	5.1 (13)	35.5 (90.6)
Average precipitation days (≥ 0.01 in)	8.9	9.0	11.0	7.2	6.4	2.2	1.1	0.9	2.0	3.5	5.9	8.5	66.6
Average snowy days (≥ 0.1 in)	2.5	1.4	1.5	0.4	0.0	0.0	0.0	0.0	0.0	0.0	0.5	1.5	7.8
Mean daily daylight hours	10.0	11.0	12.0	13.0	14.0	15.0	14.0	14.0	12.0	11.0	10.0	10.0	12.0
Average ultraviolet index	2	4	6	7	9	10	11	10	8	5	3	2	6
Source 1: NOAA (snow/snow days 1981–2010)
Source 2: Weather Atlas

== Demographics ==
Historical population
Census	Pop.	Note	%±
2000	265		—
2010	1,035		290.6%
2020	337		−67.4%
U.S. Decennial Census; 1860–1870 1880-1890; 1900 1910 1920; 1930 1940 1950; 1960 1970 1980; 1990 2000 2010

Yosemite Valley first appeared as a census-designated place in the 2000 United States census.

=== 2020 ===
The 2020 United States census reported that Yosemite Valley had a population of 337. The population density was 163.8 inhabitants per square mile (63.2/km^{2}). The racial makeup of Yosemite Valley was 252 (74.8%) White, 2 (0.6%) African American, 6 (1.8%) Native American, 16 (4.7%) Asian, 1 (0.3%) Pacific Islander, 17 (5.0%) from other races, and 43 (12.8%) from two or more races. Hispanic or Latino of any race were 43 persons (12.8%).

The census reported that 96.4% of the population lived in households, 3.6% lived in non-institutionalized group quarters, and no one was institutionalized.

There were 163 households, out of which 38 (23.3%) had children under the age of 18 living in them, 57 (35.0%) were married-couple households, 13 (8.0%) were cohabiting couple households, 48 (29.4%) had a female householder with no partner present, and 45 (27.6%) had a male householder with no partner present. 68 households (41.7%) were one person, and 7 (4.3%) were one person aged 65 or older. The average household size was 1.99. There were 73 families (44.8% of all households).

The age distribution was 61 people (18.1%) under the age of 18, 25 people (7.4%) aged 18 to 24, 142 people (42.1%) aged 25 to 44, 87 people (25.8%) aged 45 to 64, and 22 people (6.5%) who were 65 years of age or older. The median age was 36.3 years. For every 100 females, there were 87.2 males.

There were 217 housing units at an average density of 105.4 units per square mile (40.7 units/km^{2}), of which 163 (75.1%) were occupied. Of these, 24 (14.7%) were owner-occupied, and 139 (85.3%) were occupied by renters.

=== 2010 ===
At the 2010 census Yosemite Valley had a population of 1,035. The population density was 488.1 inhabitants per square mile (188.5/km^{2}). The racial makeup of Yosemite Valley was 831 (80.3%) White, 28 (2.7%) African American, 31 (3.0%) Native American, 31 (3.0%) Asian, 7 (0.7%) Pacific Islander, 70 (6.8%) from other races, and 37 (3.6%) from two or more races. Hispanic or Latino of any race were 123 people (11.9%).

The census reported that 511 people (49.4% of the population) lived in households, 524 (50.6%) lived in non-institutionalized group quarters, and no one was institutionalized.

There were 282 households, 44 (15.6%) had children under the age of 18 living in them, 74 (26.2%) were opposite-sex married couples living together, 6 (2.1%) had a female householder with no husband present, 6 (2.1%) had a male householder with no wife present. There were 21 (7.4%) unmarried opposite-sex partnerships, and 3 (1.1%) same-sex married couples or partnerships. 127 households (45.0%) were one person and 12 (4.3%) had someone living alone who was 65 or older. The average household size was 1.81. There were 86 families (30.5% of households); the average family size was 2.84.

The age distribution was 81 people (7.8%) under the age of 18, 140 people (13.5%) aged 18 to 24, 413 people (39.9%) aged 25 to 44, 378 people (36.5%) aged 45 to 64, and 23 people (2.2%) who were 65 or older. The median age was 37.6 years. For every 100 females, there were 148.8 males. For every 100 females age 18 and over, there were 157.1 males.

There were 323 housing units at an average density of 152.3 per square mile, of the occupied units 2 (0.7%) were owner-occupied and 280 (99.3%) were rented. The homeowner vacancy rate was 0%; the rental vacancy rate was 1.8%. 3 people (0.3% of the population) lived in owner-occupied housing units and 508 people (49.1%) lived in rental housing units.

== Government ==
In the California State Legislature, Yosemite Valley is in the 4th senatorial district, represented by Republican Marie Alvarado-Gil, and the 8th Assembly district, represented by Republican David Tangipa.

In the United States House of Representatives, Yosemite Valley is in California's 5th congressional district, represented by Republican Tom McClintock.
