= Ahwahnee Hotel =

Hotel in Yosemite National Park, California, US

The Ahwahnee
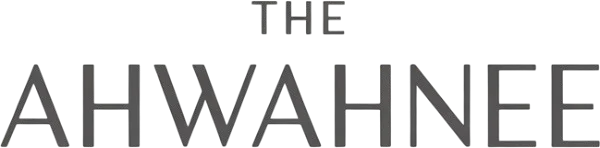

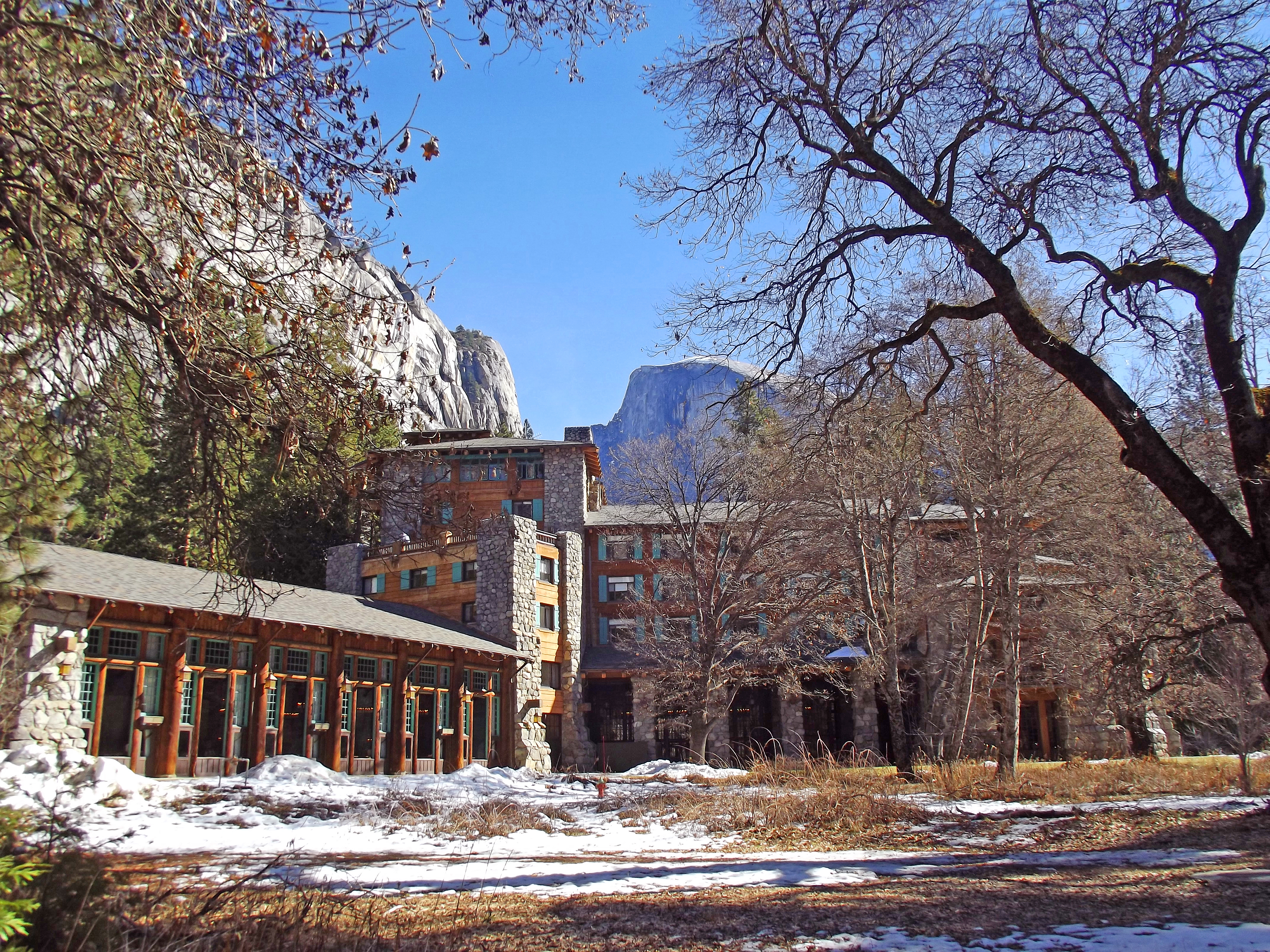
- The Ahwahnee in winter, 2013
- Interactive map of the The Ahwahnee area

General information
- Architectural style: National Park Service rustic
- Location: Yosemite Valley, Yosemite National Park, California
- Coordinates: 37°44′46.1″N 119°34′27.4″W
- Construction started: August 1, 1926
- Completed: July 1927

Design and construction
- Architect: Gilbert Stanley Underwood

Website
- www.travelyosemite.com/lodging/the-ahwahnee

U.S. National Historic Landmark
- Designated: May 28, 1987

U.S. National Register of Historic Places
- Designated: February 15, 1977
- Reference no.: 77000149

The Ahwahnee is a grand hotel in Yosemite National Park, California, on the floor of Yosemite Valley. It was built by the Yosemite Park and Curry Company and opened for business in 1927. The hotel is constructed of steel, stone, concrete, wood, and glass, and is a premier example of National Park Service rustic architecture. It was declared a National Historic Landmark in 1987.

The Ahwahnee was temporarily renamed the Majestic Yosemite Hotel in 2016 due to a legal dispute between the U.S. government, which owns the property, and the outgoing concessionaire, Delaware North, which claimed rights to the trademarked name. The name was restored in 2019 upon settlement of the dispute.

Since 1980, The Ahwahnee is also known for being the inspiration for the interior scene design of the fictional Overlook Hotel in the Stanley Kubrick film The Shining.

== History ==
=== The Currys ===
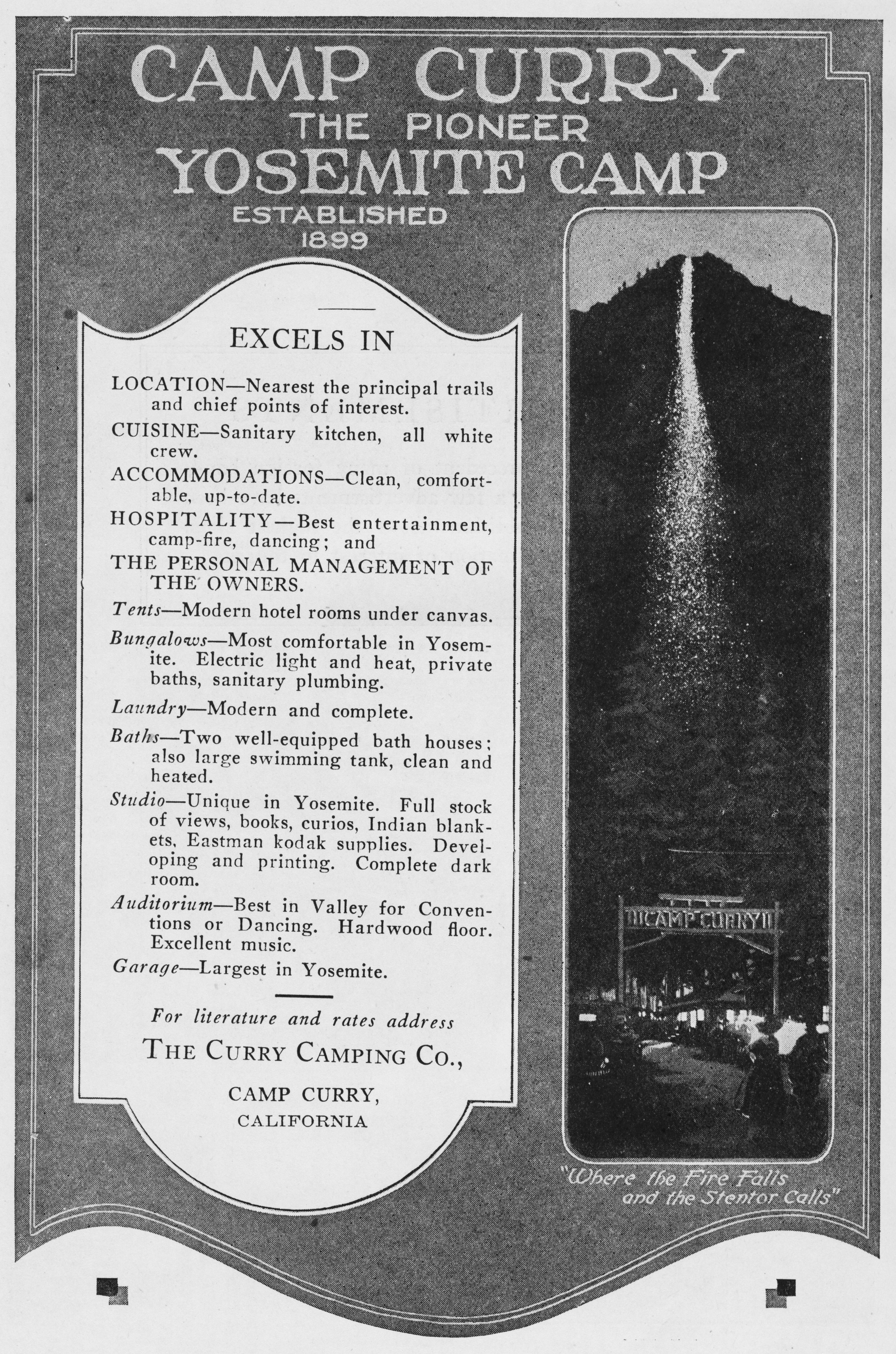
David and Jennie Curry's ad for the "Firefall"

David and Jennie Curry were schoolteachers who arrived in Yosemite Valley in 1899. The couple ran a tent camp in the valley and, despite the two-week round-trip journey via horse and wagon from Merced, California, the camp registered 292 guests in its first year. The Curry Company went on to dominate the politics of the park for decades, and David wrote the Secretary of the Interior, Franklin Lane, in an effort to extend the park's tourist season so as to expand his business. In the Currys' opinion, national parks were for recreational use, and the couple marketed the park with attractions like the Firefall.

David Curry died in 1917 and left the management of Camp Curry to his widow Jennie, who was then known as "Mother Curry". She received help from her children, particularly her daughter Mary, and Mary's husband Donald Tresidder. The camp still exists today as Curry Village.

=== Yosemite National Park Company ===
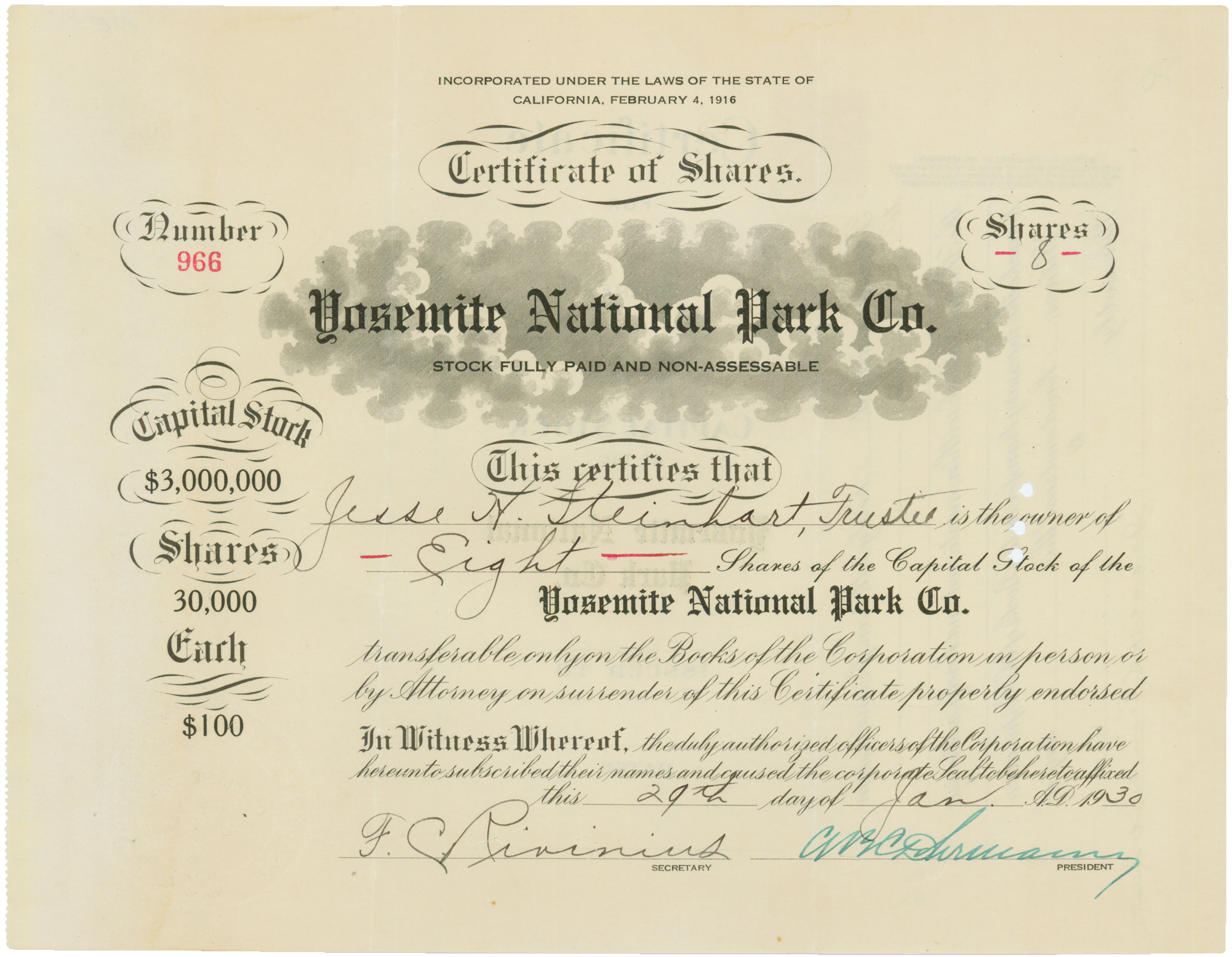
Share of the Yosemite National Park Company, issued 29 January 1930

In 1915, Stephen T. Mather convinced D. J. Desmond to convert an old army barracks into the Yosemite Lodge. Desmond also began a hotel at Glacier Point the following year, while buying out a number of businesses to improve D. J. Desmond Park Company's position in upcoming park leasing contracts. A congressional act permitted this efficient supervision of the park for the enjoyment of the public. However, prominent tourists were refusing to stay at the park due to the poor conditions of the facilities (socialite Lady Astor reportedly described the Sentinel Hotel as "primitive"), and in 1916 the newly formed National Park Service began a concerted effort to attract visitors to the parks and create better accommodations and services. Under the direction of Mather, whose greatest desire was to build a luxury hotel in Yosemite, an attempt was made to build accommodations near Yosemite Falls but it failed due to a lack of funds.

=== Yosemite Park and Curry Company ===
In 1925, the Park Service, unhappy with the declining concessions situation within the parks, decided to grant a monopoly to single entities to run the hotel and food services in each park. In response, the Curry Company and The Yosemite National Park Company (successor to D. J. Desmond Park Company) were merged to create one larger concessions company, with Donald Tresidder from the Curry Company as the new head. As part of this reorganization, the newly formed Yosemite Park and Curry Company proposed a new luxury hotel. Given the Curry Company's enormous success in the park, it was hoped that their involvement would help realize Mather's hotel. While the National Park Service technically had complete control over the park's operations, the Yosemite Park and Curry Company began to have further influence. The monopoly obtained leasing privileges and accumulated both financial and political benefits. What began as a simple campsite run by two Indiana schoolteachers ended up as the largest concessionaire for the park, and Yosemite Park and Curry Company went on to build much of the park's service structures.

=== Early years ===
Donald Tresidder, as president of the Yosemite Park and Curry Company, oversaw the building of the Ahwahnee Hotel and several other major structures within the park. The name originally selected for the new hotel was "Yosemite All-Year-Round Hotel", but Tresidder changed it just prior to opening to reflect the site's native name.

After the Ahwahnee was built, Tresidder had to overcome a number of financial obstacles. The cost of the hotel was nearly double the original estimate, and as fall approached, the number of guests began to dwindle. Park officials became concerned and suggested closing the hotel for the winter. To avoid this and to keep guests and income flowing, Tresidder centered the hotel around skiing and other winter activities. In order to keep the hotel filled throughout the holiday period, Tresidder also proposed Christmas entertainment. A banquet event was planned based on a story by Washington Irving about an eighteenth-century English Christmas at the home of the Squire of Bracebridge. The cast was filled with locals from the park, including photographer Ansel Adams.

=== Trademark and intellectual property disputes ===
In 1993 the National Park Service required a new concessioner to purchase the Yosemite Park and Curry Company from MCA Inc. and rename the business as a new company. The new concession contract was awarded to Delaware North and required that it assume all the assets and liabilities of the previous operator and deed the real property to the National Park Service.

In 2014, Delaware North lost a bid to renew its contract with the U.S. government to Yosemite Hospitality, LLC, a division of Aramark. When it originally took over the concessionaries in 1993, Delaware North was contractually required to purchase, at fair market value, "the assets of the previous concessionaire, including its intellectual property, at a cost of $115 million in today's dollars." This property included trademarks registered by both Delaware North and its predecessors, including place names such as Ahwahnee, Badger Pass, Curry Village, Yosemite Lodge, the slogan "Go climb a rock," and even "Yosemite National Park" itself. The contract with Delaware North also required that any successor concessionaire must acquire all the assets of the previous operator at fair market value. The contract with Yosemite Hospitality stated that the company be required to purchase furniture, equipment, vehicles, and "other property," but did not explicitly include intellectual property.

In 2015, Delaware North sued the NPS in the United States Court of Claims for breach of contract, claiming that the contract with Yosemite Hospitality excluded intellectual property from the asset purchase clause, and demanded a payment for the property to be determined in court. Delaware North initially asserted the fair market value of its properties was $51 million, but the National Park Service estimated the value of the intangible assets at $3.5 million. Delaware North claimed to have offered to temporarily license the trademarks while the dispute was unresolved and further claimed that the government did not respond to its offer. The dispute gained national attention after it was publicized in an issue of Outside magazine, which led to the Sierra Club issuing a petition requesting that Delaware North drop the lawsuit.

In January 2016, it was announced that due to the trademark dispute with Delaware North, the Ahwahnee Hotel and other historic hotels and lodges in the park would be renamed. The Ahwahnee was renamed the Majestic Yosemite Hotel effective March 1, 2016. The names were restored in 2019 upon settlement of the dispute.

== Concept and build ==
=== Architecture and interior design ===
Underwood's concept art shows a megalithic structure much grander in scale than what was finally built

The Ahwahnee is a 150,000-square-foot (14,000 m^{2}) Y-shaped building and has 97 hotel rooms, parlors, and suites, each accented with original Native American designs. 24 cottages bring the total number of rooms to 121. The hotel was designed by architect Gilbert Stanley Underwood, who also designed Zion Lodge, Bryce Canyon Lodge, and Grand Canyon North Rim Lodge. It was made to feel rustic and match its surroundings, and the hotel is considered a masterpiece of "parkitecture". The hotel is situated below the Royal Arches rock formation in a meadow area that previously served as a village for the native Miwoks and later as a stables complex known as Kenneyville. The site was chosen for its exposure to the sun, which allows for natural heating, and for its views of several Yosemite icons, including Glacier Point, Half Dome, and Yosemite Falls.

The original concept for the interior design by artist Henry Lovins was described as "Mayan revival" and incorporated Hispano-Moresque stylings. Lovins was replaced in 1926 by the husband and wife team of Ackerman and Pope.

The original concept art for the hotel depicted a building that was far grander than what would eventually be constructed. Underwood's original design called for a massive six story structure, but Tresidder and the board requested a hotel with only 100 guest rooms that would feel more like a luxurious country home than a hotel. The design was changed several times and at one point the hotel was to be no larger than three stories high, but eventually a more expansive layout was selected to accommodate the 100 guest rooms along with several public spaces.

The interior design of the hotel also underwent several changes. Artist and interior designer Henry Lovins originally suggested a "Mayan revival" theme with Hispano-Moresque influences. However, the husband and wife team of Arthur Upham Pope and Phyllis Ackerman was selected over Lovins. Drawing on their experience as art historians, Ackerman and Pope created a style that mixed Art Deco, Native American, Middle Eastern, and Arts and Crafts styles. The interior work was carried out by a number of artisans under their supervision. Much of the decoration originally used was Persian, and Ackerman and Pope would go on to become art consultants in Iran.

=== Construction ===
The hotel was constructed from 5,000 tons (4,500 t) of rough-cut granite, 1,000 tons (910 t) of steel, and 30,000 ft (9,100 m) of timber. The steel came from the Union Iron Works in San Francisco and the timber came from land owned by the Curry family. The apparent wood siding and structural timber on the hotel's exterior are actually formed from stained concrete poured into molds to simulate a wood pattern. Concrete was chosen as the material for the outside "wood" elements to make the hotel fire resistant. Construction lasted eleven months and cost US$1,225,000 upon completion in July 1927.

After construction was complete, the company began an advertising campaign to showcase the new amenities. However, just before opening day, the director noticed that the porte-cochère planned for the west side of the building, where the Indian room now sits, would allow exhaust fumes from automobiles to invade the premises. A hastily designed Douglas Fir pole porte-cochère entry and parking area were erected on the north side of the hotel to correct this (the logs were replaced in the 1990s). This would be the first of many changes to the hotel. In 1928, a roof garden and dance hall were converted into a private apartment after the dance hall failed to draw an audience. In 1931, the load-bearing trusses in the dining room were reinforced after it was discovered that they were barely adequate to support the snow load on the roof and potential earthquake stresses.

When Prohibition was rescinded in 1933, a private dining room was converted into the El Dorado Diggins bar, evocative of the California Gold Rush period. 1943 saw the United States Navy take over the hotel for use as a convalescent hospital for war veterans. Some of the changes made to the hotel by the Navy included a repainting of the interior and the enclosure of the original porte-cochère. After the war, when few people brought servants with them, the owners converted the chauffeur and maid rooms into guest rooms.

The 1950s, '60s, and '70s brought several upgrades to the hotel, including fire escapes, a fire alarm system, and a sprinkler system, along with an outdoor swimming pool and automatic elevators, and in the late 1970s, smoke detectors. From 2003 to 2004 the roof was overhauled, and virtually the entire slate-tile roof and copper gutter system were replaced. Martech Associates, Inc. of Millheim, Pennsylvania, designed the updated roof and served as the general contractor for the project. The project cost approximately US$4 million and is notable for its 97 percent material recycling rate. An article in the Los Angeles Times on March 13, 2009, stated that seismic retrofits might be needed for the Ahwahnee.

== Grand Dining Room and kitchen ==
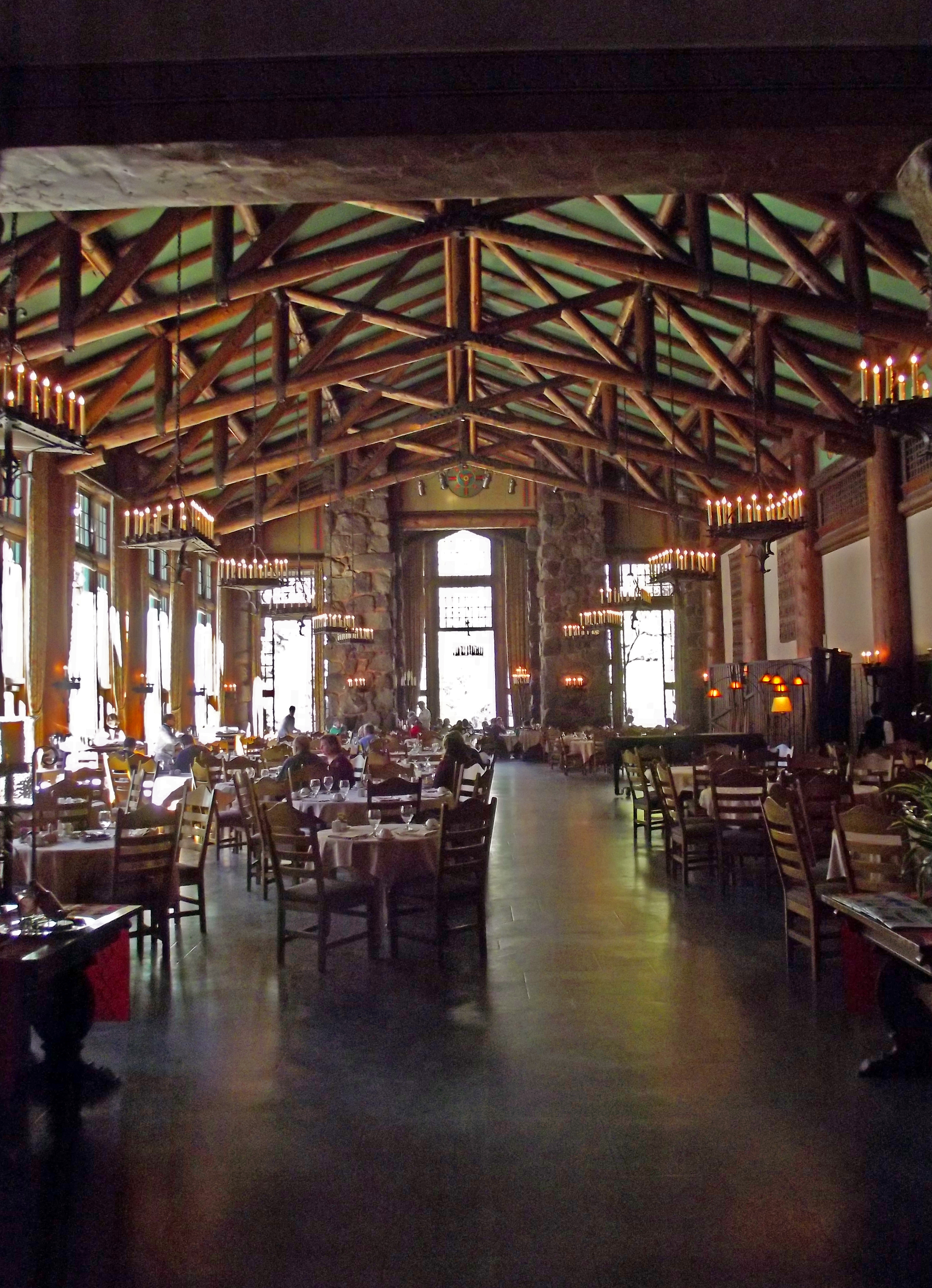
The Grand Dining Room of the Ahwahnee Hotel

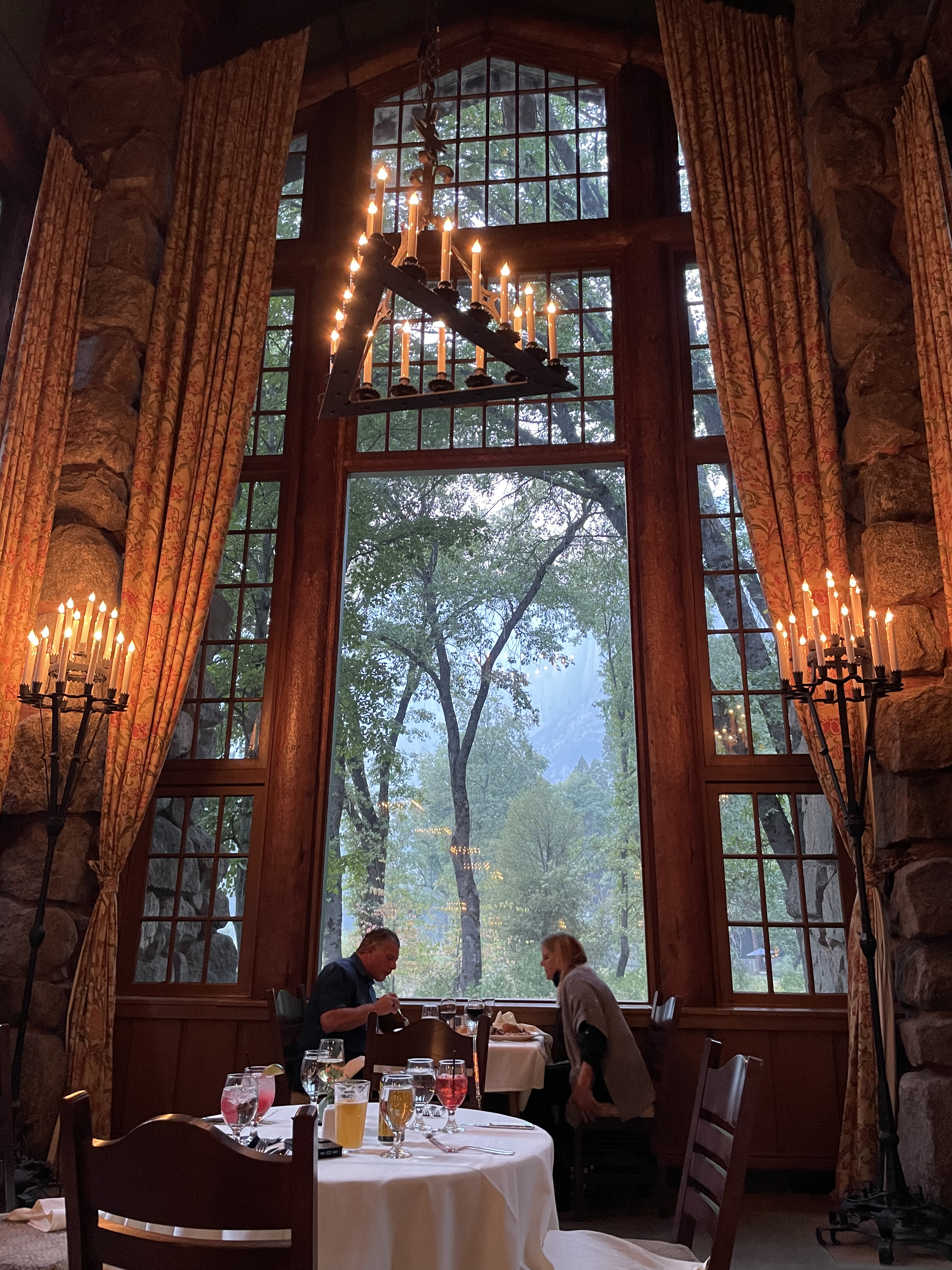
Two people eating in the Grand Dining Room

The Grand Dining Room is 130 feet long and 51 feet wide, with a 34-foot ceiling supported by rock columns, creating a cathedral-like atmosphere. For fire safety reasons, the wood beams in the dining room are actually hollow and contain steel beams. The alcove window at the end of the room perfectly framed Yosemite Falls when the hotel was completed. Although the dress code for the park is usually very casual, the Ahwahnee Dining Room used to require a jacket for men, but it later relaxed that tradition. Now collared shirts for men are allowed and women may wear either a dress or slacks and a blouse.

The Grand Dining Room was originally designed to accommodate 1,000 guests, but it was eventually scaled down to seat 350. However, the enormous kitchen still reflects the original design concept and includes separate stations for baking and pastries. High quality kitchen appliances were installed so the hotel could compete with fine dining establishments, and the facility was specifically constructed to handle special events and functions.

Regular entertainment is provided at dinner by a pianist. Local Yosemite artist Dudley Kendall played piano in the dining room at the Ahwahnee for years and had his work displayed at the hotel.

=== Bracebridge Dinner tradition ===
The Bracebridge Dinner is a seven-course formal gathering held in the Grand Dining Room and presented as a feast given by a Renaissance-era lord. This tradition began in 1927, the Ahwahnee's first year of operation, and was inspired by the fictional Squire Bracebridge's Yule celebration in a story from The Sketch Book of Geoffrey Crayon, Gent. by Washington Irving. Music and theatrical performances based on Irving's story accompany the introduction of each course. Donald Tresidder conceived the idea for the event with his wife Mary Curry, their friends, and park staff.

Tresidder hired Garnet Holme for the event's first year to write the script and produce the event, and Tresidder and his wife played the squire and his lady until Tresidder's death in 1948. Photographer Ansel Adams, who was working for the Yosemite Park and Curry Company and was well known in Yosemite for his eccentricities, was asked to be a part of Tresidder's new winter celebrations in the elaborate, theatrical Christmas dinner with friends from the nearby Bohemian Club. Cast as the "Jester", Adams had asked the director for suggestions but was told to just act like a jester. Adams fortified himself with a few drinks and went on to climb the granite pillars to the rafters. Adams played the Lord of Misrule for the first two years. When Holme died in 1929, Tresidder asked Adams to take over the direction of the show. Adams reworked the script considerably in 1931, creating the role of Major Domo, head of the household, for himself while his wife, Virginia Best Adams, played the housekeeper.

The dinner was not held during World War II, when the Ahwahnee was functioning as a naval hospital. When it resumed, the 1946 dinner introduced chorale concerts and more significant musical performances. Up until 1956 there was only a single performance, and then the number of performances gradually increased to a total of eight. Ansel Adams retired from the event in 1973, passing it on to Eugene Fulton, who had been part of the male chorus since 1934 and musical director since 1946. Fulton died unexpectedly on Christmas Eve in 1978 and his wife, Anna-Marie, and his daughter, Andrea, took over that year and produced the show. In 1979, Andrea Fulton assumed the role of director, which she holds to this day while also playing the role of housekeeper.

In 2011, the Bracebridge dinner celebrated its 85th anniversary. Travel + Leisure magazine named Yosemite's Ahwahnee Hotel as one of the best hotels in the United States for the holidays for two consecutive years (2011 and 2012). For much of its history, tickets to the event were difficult to obtain. In prior years, the scarce tickets were awarded to applicants by lottery. In 1992, there were a reported 60,000 applications for the coveted 1,650 seats. In 1995, the organizers of the traditional dinner accepted ticket cancellations because the park could have been shut down due to the national budget impasse. After a five year absence, the Bracebridge Dinner returned to the Ahwahnee Hotel in 2024, with ticket prices set at over $500 per person.

== Great Lounge ==
The Great Lounge is one of the main public spaces in the hotel. The large space spans the full width of the wing and nearly its full length (minus the solarium). There are two large fireplaces on either end of the room made from cut sandstone. On either side of the lounge is a series of floor-to-ceiling plate-glass picture windows ornamented at their tops with stained glass. The individual border designs in the beams of the Great Lounge are by artist Jeanette Dryer Spencer.

== In popular culture ==
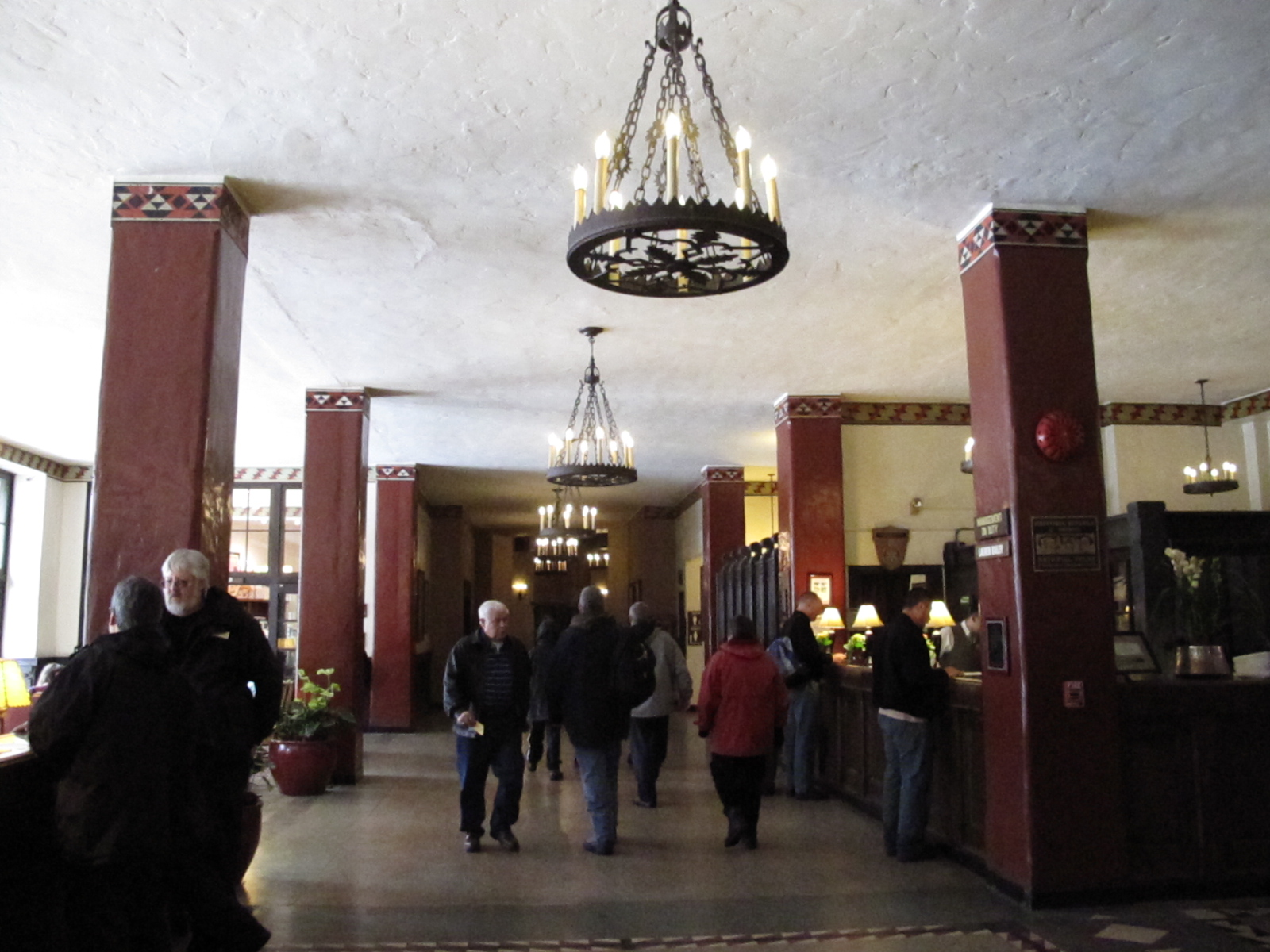
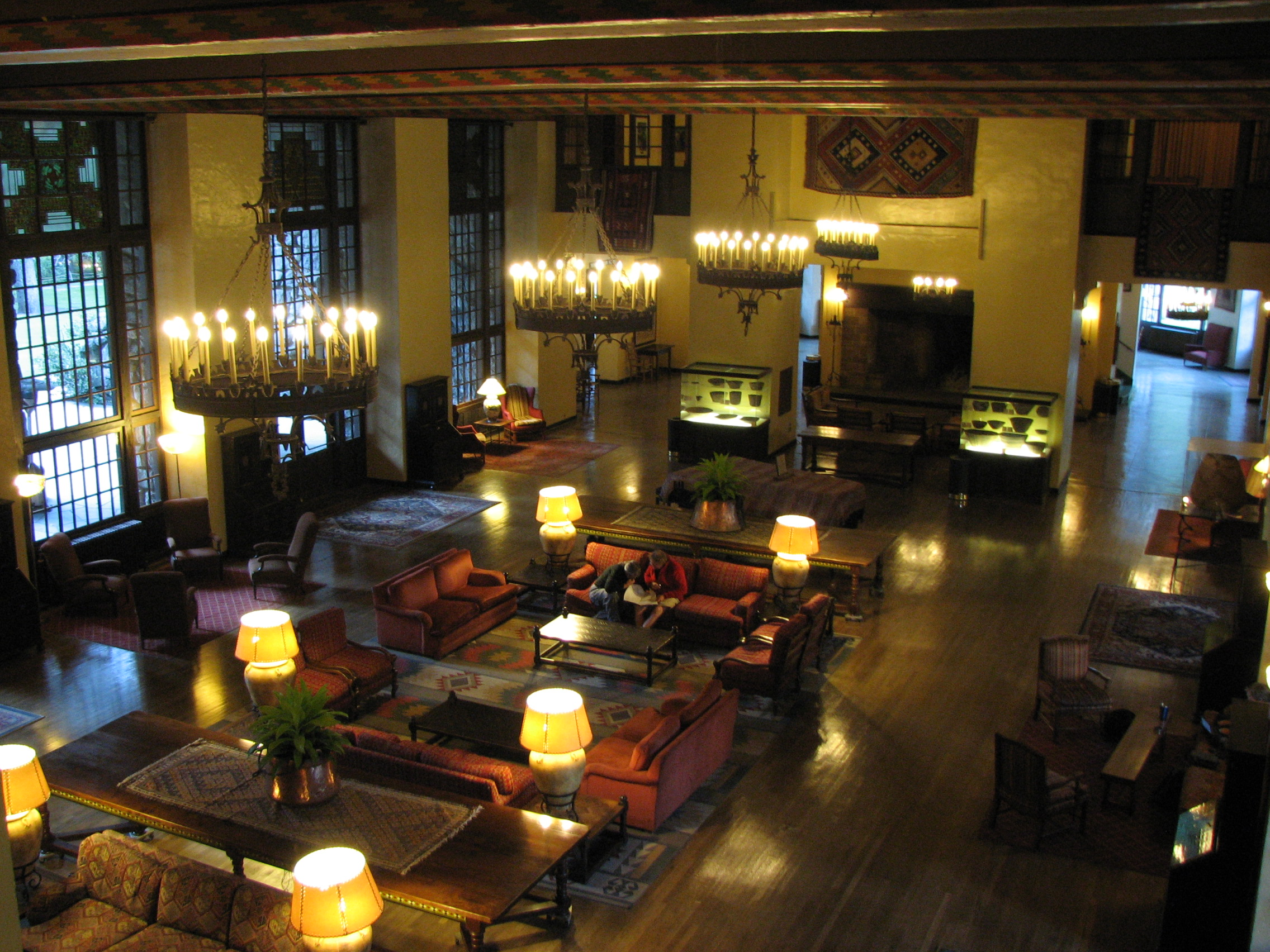
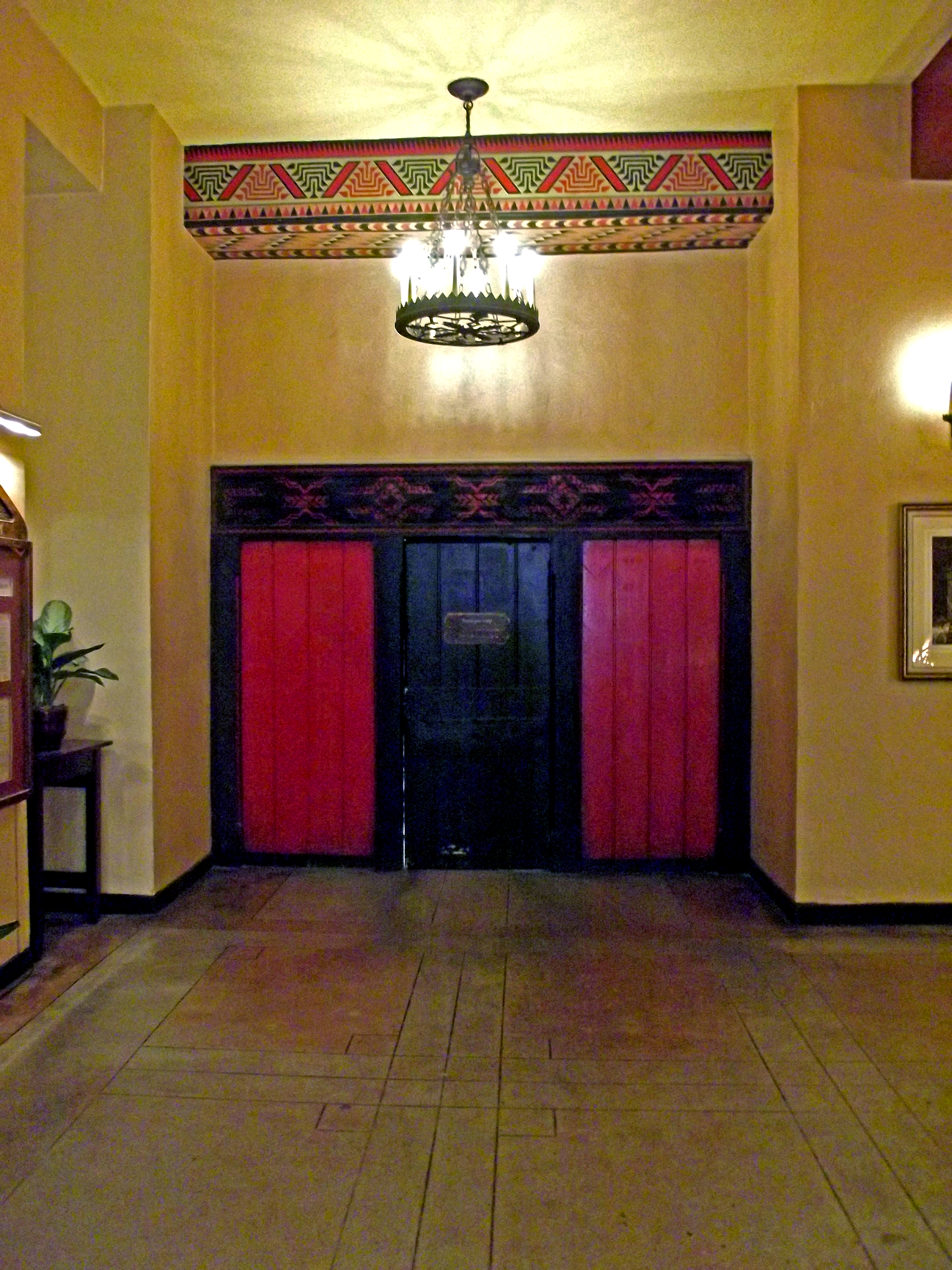
Several of the Ahwahnee interiors were used as templates for the sets of the fictional Overlook Hotel in the horror film The Shining (1980).

=== Film ===
Scenes of the 1940 classic My Favorite Wife starring Cary Grant and Irene Dunne were set in a hotel with stone features like The Ahwahnee and purported to be in Yosemite, but were filmed on a sound stage.

Both the film The Caine Mutiny (1954) and Color of a Brisk and Leaping Day (1996) include footage of the Ahwahnee Hotel. Stanley Kubrick used some Ahwahnee interiors as templates for the fictional Overlook Hotel's interior in The Shining.

=== Radio ===
The Ahwahnee Hotel features in the February 18, 1940, and February 25, 1940, episodes of The Jell-O Program Starring Jack Benny. In the script, the entire cast visit and stay in a fictionalized, comedic version of the hotel during a ski vacation to Badger Pass.

== Notable guests ==
The hotel and dining room have hosted many notable figures including artists, royalty, heads of state, film and television stars, writers, business executives, and other celebrities. Examples of notable guests include heads of state Queen Elizabeth II, Presidents Dwight D. Eisenhower, John F. Kennedy, Ronald Reagan, Barack Obama, Herbert Hoover, and Shah Mohammad Reza Pahlavi; business moguls Walt Disney and Steve Jobs; entertainers Desi Arnaz, Lucille Ball, Charlie Chaplin, Judy Garland, Leonard Nimoy, Will Rogers and William Shatner; and writer Gertrude Stein.

== See also ==
- National Register of Historic Places listings in Yosemite National Park
- List of dining events
- National Register of Historic Places listings in Mariposa County, California
