= Yosemite Lodge at the Falls =

Hotel in Yosemite National Park, California, United States

Coordinates: 37.7432°N 119.5980°W

Yosemite Valley Lodge
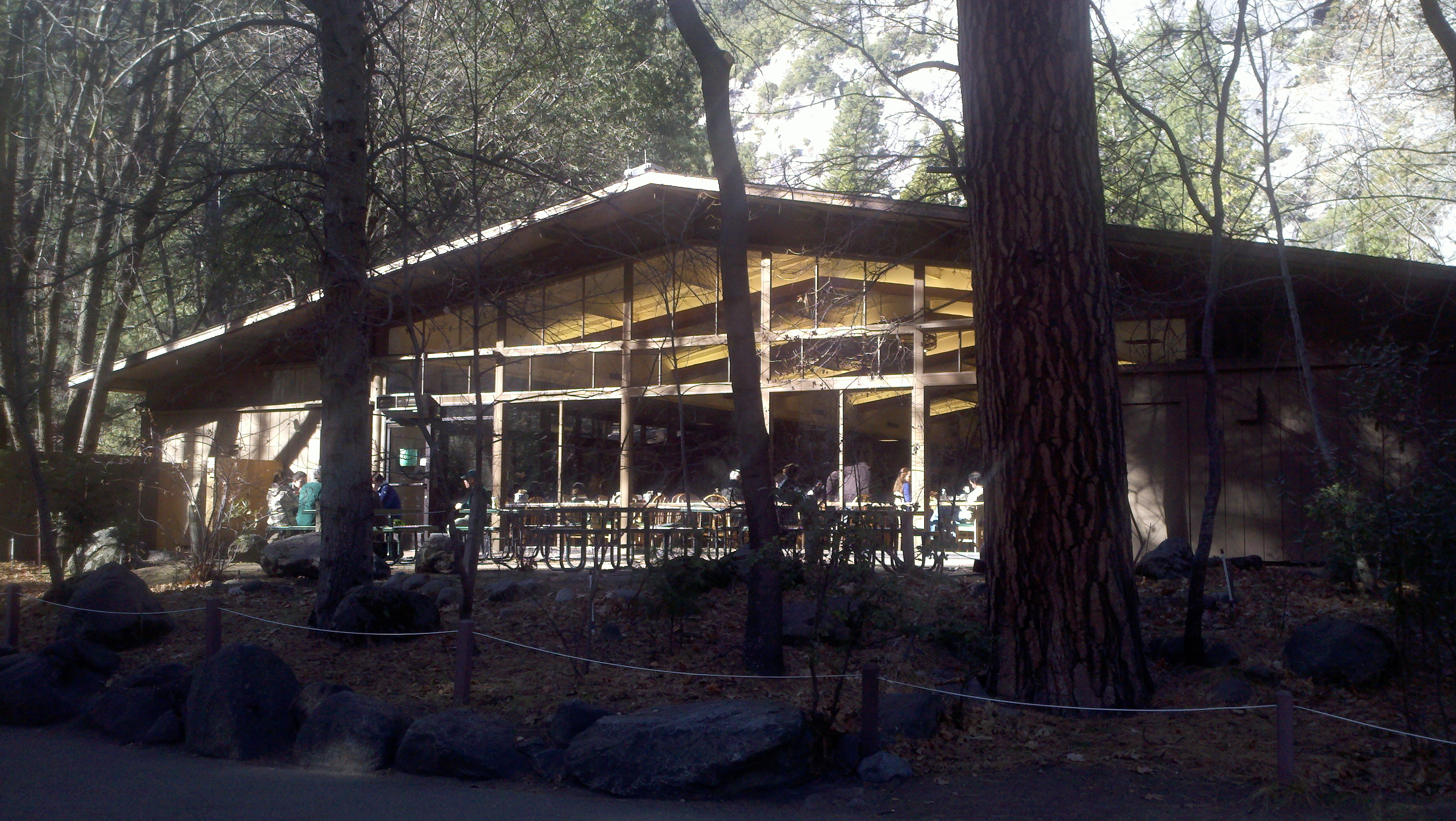
- Yosemite Lodge dining room
- Hotel chain: Aramark

General information
- Location: Yosemite Village, California, United States, 9006 Yosemite Lodge Drive
- Operator: Yosemite Hospitality, LLC (affiliate of Aramark)

Technical details
- Floor count: 1-2, depending on building

Other information
- Number of rooms: 245
- Number of restaurants: Base Camp Eatery; Mountain Room Restaurant; Mountain Room Lounge

Website
- www.travelyosemite.com/lodging/yosemite-valley-lodge/

The Yosemite Valley Lodge, often referred to informally within the Park as "The Lodge" is located west of Yosemite Village, in Yosemite National Park, Mariposa County, California. The lodging accommodation is close to Yosemite Falls.

The Lodge complex has a total of 245 rooms, located in a total of 15 separate buildings, including the main Lodge. Each offers from six to thirty-one rooms. The Cedar Building is the only one to contain larger "family rooms". The buildings are named after species of flowers or trees.

The Lodge is the less expensive of the two options in the Yosemite Valley that offer hotel rooms. The other is the Ahwahnee Hotel. Both of these are operated by concessionaires under contract to the National Park Service, which administers the Park. Since March 2016, the Lodge has been operated by Yosemite Hospitality, a subsidiary of Aramark.

The offerings of the Lodge complex were reduced by more than half following damage from the 100-year flood of January 1997, when the Merced River damaged or destroyed numerous cabins and more than 100 hotel rooms in other buildings.

== History ==
The Lodge complex was built during the 1930s and the Great Depression, as a Works Progress Administration project under the President Franklin D. Roosevelt administration. Originally operated by staff of the National Park Service, which has primary responsibility for administering the Park, the Lodge services were later contracted out to private concessionaires.

In 1992 Delaware North Parks and Resorts made the winning bid for primary concessions and was awarded management of Yosemite Lodge by the National Park Service, the federal agency with legislative authority for administering the Park.

In January 1997, during a 100-year flood of the nearby Merced River, some 189 cabins and 108 hotel rooms of the Lodge were destroyed or badly damaged as a result. The Lodge complex lost 54% of its total capacity of 546 rooms by this.

Delaware North was replaced as concessionaire by Aramark on March 1, 2016. During a trademark dispute between Delaware North and the National Park Service later that year, NPS renamed Yosemite Lodge at the Falls as Yosemite Valley Lodge, along with several related properties.

After settlement of the dispute in 2019, NPS restored the historical names of the Lodge and other attractions in the Park.

== Mountain Room Restaurant ==
On 14 August 2026, a federal grand jury indicted Danavon Caine, 36, a citizen of Jamaica, who was working on a seasonal H-2B visa, in Yosemite National Park, charging him with two counts of sexual abuse against a 19-year-old co-worker.

== List of buildings ==
Each building has a different decor and a different layout; some have exterior corridors; some have interior ones.

Geographically, from east to west they are the following:

- Tamarack (rooms 4121–4129)
- Dogwood (rooms 4111–4119)
- Aspen (rooms 4101–4109)
- Elderberry (rooms 4200–4229)
- Willow (rooms 4300–4325)
- Cottonwood (rooms 4400–4409)
- Manzanita (rooms 4500–4529)
- Cedar (rooms 3901–3927)
- Azalea (rooms 4600–4625)
- Birch (rooms 4700–4705)
- Alder (rooms 3601–3630)
- Maple (rooms 3501–3536)
- Hemlock (rooms 3401–3436)
- Juniper (rooms 3301–3330)
- Laurel (rooms 3201–3330)

== See also ==
- Ahwahnee Hotel
- Yosemite Area Regional Transportation System (YARTS)
