= Firefall (disambiguation) =

Firefall is an American rock band formed in 1974.

Firefall or Fire Falls, may also refer to:

== Events ==
- Firefall (event), an ember dumping held at Yosemite National Park from 1872 until 1968
- Firefall, a phenomenon at Horsetail Fall (Yosemite) when the evening sun lights up the fall at a specific time of year
- Firefalls, a pre-Christian event, a flaming ball launch, part of the medieval festival Krakelingen and Tonnekensbrand, still celebrated in Geraardsbergen, Belgium

== Literature ==
- Firefall (poetry collection), a 1993 collection of poetry by Mona Van Duyn
- Firefall (comics), a Marvel Comics character
- Fire Falls of the planet Krypton; a DC Comics location
- Firefall, a science-fiction series by Peter Watts

== Music ==
- Firefall (album), self-titled 1976 debut album
- "Fire Fall" (song), a 1998 song by 'The Residents' off the album Wormwood: Curious Stories from the Bible
- "Fire Fall" (song), a 1999 song by 'Mannafest' off the album Downpour
- "Fire Fall" (song), a 2019 song by 'Planetshakers' off the album Rain, Part 1

== Videogaming ==
- Firefall (video game), a retired 2014 team-based action shooter developed by Red 5 Studios
  - Firefall Bus, a custom promotional motorbus for the videogame created by West Coast Customs
- Firefall Arcade, a 1993 Macintosh game in the style of Centipede developed by Pangea Software
- Fire Falls, a fictional location from the videogame Drakensang: The Dark Eye

== Other uses ==
- The Firefall, a 1904 silent film short
- Firefall (ride), a thrill ride at California's Great America
- Fire Falls (racehorse), the mother of U.S. racehorse Imbros
