= Iowa Writers' Workshop =

MFA degree granting program since 1936

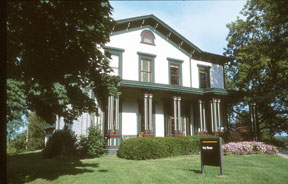
- Dey House, home of the Iowa Writers' Workshop
- Other name: University of Iowa Writers' Workshop
- Type: MFA degree program
- Established: 1936; 90 years ago
- Director: Lan Samantha Chang
- Students: 90 (Fall 2022)
- Location: Iowa City, Iowa, United States; 41°40′02″N 91°32′06″W
- Website: writersworkshop.uiowa.edu

The Iowa Writers' Workshop, at the University of Iowa, is a graduate-level creative writing program. At 90 years, it is the oldest writing program offering a Master of Fine Arts (MFA) degree in the United States. Its acceptance rate is between 2.7% and 3.7%. On the university's behalf, the workshop administers the Truman Capote Award for Literary Criticism and the Iowa Short Fiction Award.

The workshop's director is the writer Lan Samantha Chang, under whom its endowment has grown from $2.6 million to $12.5 million.

== History ==
In 1897, theater producer George Cram Cook began teaching a class called "Verse-Making", effectively the University of Iowa's first creative writing class. In 1922, Dean Carl Seashore of the University of Iowa Graduate College allowed creative writing to be accepted as theses for advanced degrees. Later, the School of Letters began selecting students for writing courses in which they were tutored by resident and visiting writers. The Iowa Writers' Workshop began as an official program in 1936, with Wilbur Schramm as its first director.

Under Paul Engle, its second director from 1941 to 1965, the program became a national landmark and was divided into fiction and poetry. He partnered with Esquire for a 1959 symposium titled "The Writer in Mass Culture" that included as guests Norman Mailer, Ralph Ellison, and Mark Harris, and was covered in Newsweek. In 1962, Engle and his wife, Hualing Nieh Engle, started the country's first translation workshop, which led to the creation of the university's MFA program in literary translation. In 1967, the couple founded the International Writing Program, and in 1976, they were nominated for the Nobel Peace Prize for their work facilitating creative and cultural exchange through the International Writing Program. A reported over 300 writers supported them for the honor, which the Nobel Committee eventually did not give that year.

Engle secured donations for the workshop from the business community for about 20 years, including locals such as Maytag and Quaker Oats, as well as U.S. Steel and Reader's Digest. Between 1953 and 1956, the Rockefeller Foundation donated $40,000. Henry Luce, the publisher of TIME and Life magazines, and Gardner Cowles Jr., who published Look magazine, provided publicity for the workshop's events.

Subsequent directors were George Starbuck (1965–69), John Leggett (1969–86), and Frank Conroy (1987–2005), whose 19 years at the helm were the longest at the time.

Lan Samantha Chang was appointed the Workshop's sixth director in 2006. She is the program's first female, first Asian American, and first nonwhite director, and has held the role since.

=== Locations ===
The Writers' Workshop originated in temporary military barracks-style buildings near the Iowa River, where the Iowa Memorial Union stands, but in 1966 moved to the English-Philosophy Building. In 1997, it moved to a new location, Dey House. The Glenn Schaeffer Library and Archives, an extension including a library and reading room, classrooms, and faculty offices, was added to Dey House in 2006.

== Organization ==
=== Methodology ===
The Workshop was formed by Norman Foerster's passionate support for creative writing and Wilbur Schramm's conviction that writing should be as technical and rigorous a pursuit as any traditional literature degree. The workshop model for higher education creative writing was created in that pursuit of technical intensity. The model constantly exposed students to outside opinions on their fiction and created a pressurized atmosphere that forced students to rein in their emotional reactions and consider their work analytically. The Workshop operated without the characteristic assumption of the time that artists needed to be unleashed, instead opting to focus and refine them. While intended to serve fiction writers, the Workshop began to change in the 1970s when its first nonfiction thesis was accepted. Ever since, the Workshop has produced many literary journalists and shaped public perception of creative nonfiction.

=== Curriculum and courses ===
The program's curriculum requires students to take a small number of classes each semester, including the Graduate Fiction Workshop or Graduate Poetry Workshop and one or two additional literature seminars. These requirements are meant to prepare students for the realities of professional writing, where self-discipline is paramount. The graduate workshop courses meet weekly. Before each three-hour class, a small number of students submit material for critical reading by their peers. The class consists of a round-table discussion during which the students and the instructor discuss each piece. How classes are conducted varies by teacher and between poetry and fiction. The ideal result is not only that writers come away with insights into their work's strengths and weaknesses, but that the class as a whole derives insight, whether general or specific, about the process of writing.

When the Workshop received the National Humanities Medal in 2002, then director Conroy explained its ethos: "It is a focused program, like Juilliard. We read constantly, rereading the classics. They can write anything they want. We teach them what we've learned as writers."

In a 2022 interview, Chang said:

We don't have a quota about where people are from or what kind of writing they do. What we look for is work that is filled with energy, work that interests us. I'm sure, every year, there are many, many very good writers who go elsewhere because we don't admit them. But we try to be very open. I would say that we look for work that excites us. Frank Conroy used to describe it as feeling someone reaching off the page at you when you're reading, feeling tension in the language.

=== Faculty ===
Faculty have included Kurt Vonnegut, Richard Yates, Philip Roth, John Cheever, Marilynne Robinson, James Galvin and Ladee Hubbard.

As of May 2025, the workshop's faculty are Jamel Brinkley, Charles D'Ambrosio, and Margot Livesey in fiction; Ethan Canin in English and creative writing; Mark Levine, Tracie Morris, Margaret Ross, and Elizabeth Willis in poetry; and Program Director Lan Samantha Chang. Visiting faculty are Ari Banias, Tom Drury, Evan James, Afabwaje Kurian, Claire Lombardo, and Carmen Maria Machado.

== Reputation and influence ==
In 1986, during the 50th anniversary of the Workshop, The New York Times wrote: "At 50, the Iowa workshop is something of a dowager, standing unshakably in the mainstream of our literary life."

In 2019, five graduates won Guggenheim Fellowships. In April 2021, the American Academy of Arts and Letters recognized seven graduates and former faculty: five graduates and a former visiting faculty member received awards, and an alumna was elected to membership. In response to the news, Chang said:

The graduates being distinguished by the American Academy of Arts and Letters in 2021 came to the Iowa Writers' Workshop over a period of more than four decades. This reflects the strength and longevity of the Iowa Writers' Workshop and creative writing at Iowa.

Graduates have gone on to become directors of other notable creative writing MFA programs, including Wallace Stegner at Stanford University, Eileen Pollack at the University of Michigan, Vance Bourjaily at Louisiana State University, Bret Anthony Johnston at the University of Texas, Austin's Michener Center, and Adam Haslett at The City University of New York's Hunter College. They have also become top editors at major publishers. These include Haki R. Madhubuti, founder of Third World Press; Jill Bialosky, executive editor and vice president at W. W. Norton & Company; and Thomas Gebremedhin, vice president and executive editor of Doubleday. Among them have also been editors of major publications, including D. Herbert Lipson of Ebony, and curators, such as Christine Kuan, former CEO and director of Sotheby's Institute of Art New York.

On the HBO program Girls, the character Hannah Horvath enrolls in the Iowa Writers' Workshop.

The Iowa Writers Workshop is not without detractors; critic S. T. Joshi has said the workshop can encourage a "turgid [and] clotted" prose style.

== Awards won by faculty and alumni ==
=== Pulitzer Prizes ===
==== Fiction ====
- Robert Penn Warren, 1947 Pulitzer for All the King's Men, former faculty member.
- Wallace Stegner, 1972 Pulitzer for Angle of Repose, MA, 1932; PhD, English, 1935.
- James Alan McPherson, 1977 Pulitzer for Elbow Room, MFA, 1969; former faculty member.
- John Cheever, 1979 Pulitzer for The Stories of John Cheever, former faculty member.
- Jane Smiley, 1992 Pulitzer for A Thousand Acres, MA, 1975; MFA, English, 1976; PhD, English, 1978.
- Philip Roth, 1998 Pulitzer for American Pastoral, former faculty member.
- Michael Cunningham, 1999 Pulitzer for The Hours, MFA, English, 1980.
- Marilynne Robinson, 2005 Pulitzer for Gilead, emeritus faculty member.
- Paul Harding, 2010 Pulitzer for Tinkers, MFA, English, 2000.
- Andrew Sean Greer, 2018 Pulitzer for Less, former visiting faculty member.
- Jayne Anne Phillips, 2024 Pulitzer for Night Watch, MFA, 1978.

==== Memoir or autobiography ====
- Yiyun Li, 2026 Pulitzer for Things in Nature Merely Grow, alumna.

==== Journalism ====
- Tracy Kidder, 1982 Pulitzer in general nonfiction for The Soul of a New Machine, MFA, 1974.

==== Poetry ====
- Karl Shapiro, 1945 Pulitzer for V-Letter and Other Poems, former faculty member
- Robert Lowell, 1947 Pulitzer for Lord Weary's Castle, 1974 Pulitzer for The Dolphin, former faculty member
- Robert Penn Warren, 1958 Pulitzer for Poems 1954–56, Now and Then, 1980 Pulitzer for Poems 1976–78, former faculty member
- W. D. Snodgrass, 1960 Pulitzer for Heart's Needle, BA, 1949; MA, 1951; MFA, 1953
- John Berryman, 1965 Pulitzer for 77 Dream Songs, former faculty member
- Anthony Hecht, 1968 Pulitzer for The Hard Hours, attended Workshop but did not graduate
- Donald Justice, 1980 Pulitzer for Selected Poems, alumnus and former faculty member
- Carolyn Kizer, 1985 Pulitzer for Yin, former faculty member
- Rita Dove, 1987 Pulitzer for Thomas and Beulah, MFA, 1977
- Mona Van Duyn, 1991 Pulitzer for Near Changes, MA, English, 1943
- James Tate, 1992 Pulitzer for Selected Poems, MFA, 1967
- Louise Glück, 1993 Pulitzer for The Wild Iris, former faculty member
- Philip Levine, 1995 Pulitzer for The Simple Truth, MFA, 1957; former faculty member
- Jorie Graham, 1996 Pulitzer for The Dream of the Unified Field, MFA, English, 1978; former faculty member
- Charles Wright, 1998 Pulitzer for Black Zodiac, MFA, 1963
- Mark Strand, 1999 Pulitzer for Blizzard of One, MA, 1962; former faculty member
- Robert Hass, 2008 Pulitzer for Time and Materials, frequent visiting faculty member
- Philip Schultz, 2008 Pulitzer for Failure, MFA, English, 1971

=== U.S. Poets Laureate ===
- Mark Strand, 2019–20, MFA '78.
- Rita Dove, 1993, MFA '77, the youngest person and first African American to hold the position
- Philip Levine
- Robert Penn Warren, faculty
- Mona Jane Van Duyn, faculty
- Robert Hass, faculty
- Louise Glück, faculty
- Charles Wright, 2014–16, MFA '70
- Juan Felipe Herrera, 2015–17, MFA '91
- Joy Harjo, 2019–20, MFA '78, the first Native American person to hold the position

=== Booker Prize ===
- Eleanor Catton, 2013, for The Luminaries, alumna

=== National Humanities Medal ===
- Rita Dove, 1996
- Iowa Writers' Workshop, 2003

=== MacArthur Fellowship ===
- Yiyun Li, 2003
- Jorie Graham, 1990
