= 1978 Pulitzer Prize =

Awards for journalism and related fields

The Pulitzer Prizes for 1978 are:

== Journalism awards ==
- Public Service:
  - The Philadelphia Inquirer, for a series of articles showing abuses of power by the police in its home city.
- Local General or Spot News Reporting:
  - Richard Whitt of the Louisville Courier-Journal, for his coverage of a fire that took 164 lives at the Beverly Hills Supper Club at Southgate, Kentucky, and subsequent investigation of the lack of enforcement of state fire codes.
- Local Investigative Specialized Reporting:
  - Anthony R. Dolan of the Stamford Advocate (Connecticut), for a series on municipal corruption.
- National Reporting:
  - Gaylord D. Shaw of the Los Angeles Times, for a series on unsafe structural conditions at the nation's major dams.
- International Reporting:
  - Henry Kamm of The New York Times, for his stories on the refugees, boat people, from Indochina.
- Commentary:
  - William Safire of The New York Times, for commentary on the Bert Lance affair.
- Criticism:
  - Walter Kerr of The New York Times, for articles on the theater in 1977 and throughout his long career.
- Editorial Writing:
  - Meg Greenfield, deputy editorial page editor of The Washington Post, for selected samples of her work.
- Editorial Cartooning:
  - Jeffrey K. MacNelly of the Richmond News Leader.
- Spot News Photography:
  - John H. Blair, special assignment photographer for United Press International, for a photograph of an Indianapolis broker being held hostage at gunpoint by Anthony Kiritsis.
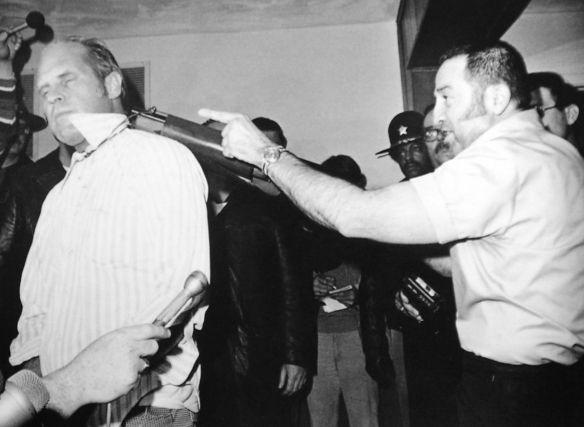
The prize-winning spot news photograph
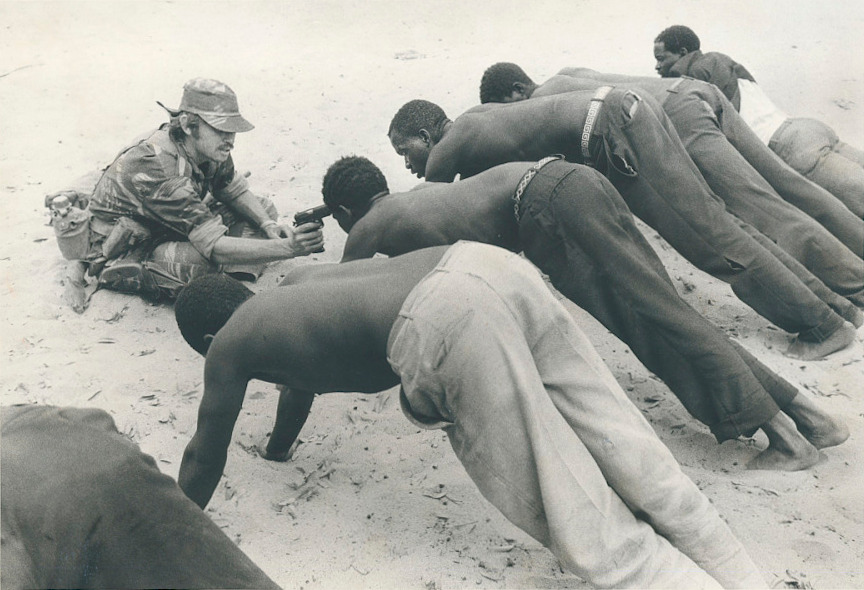
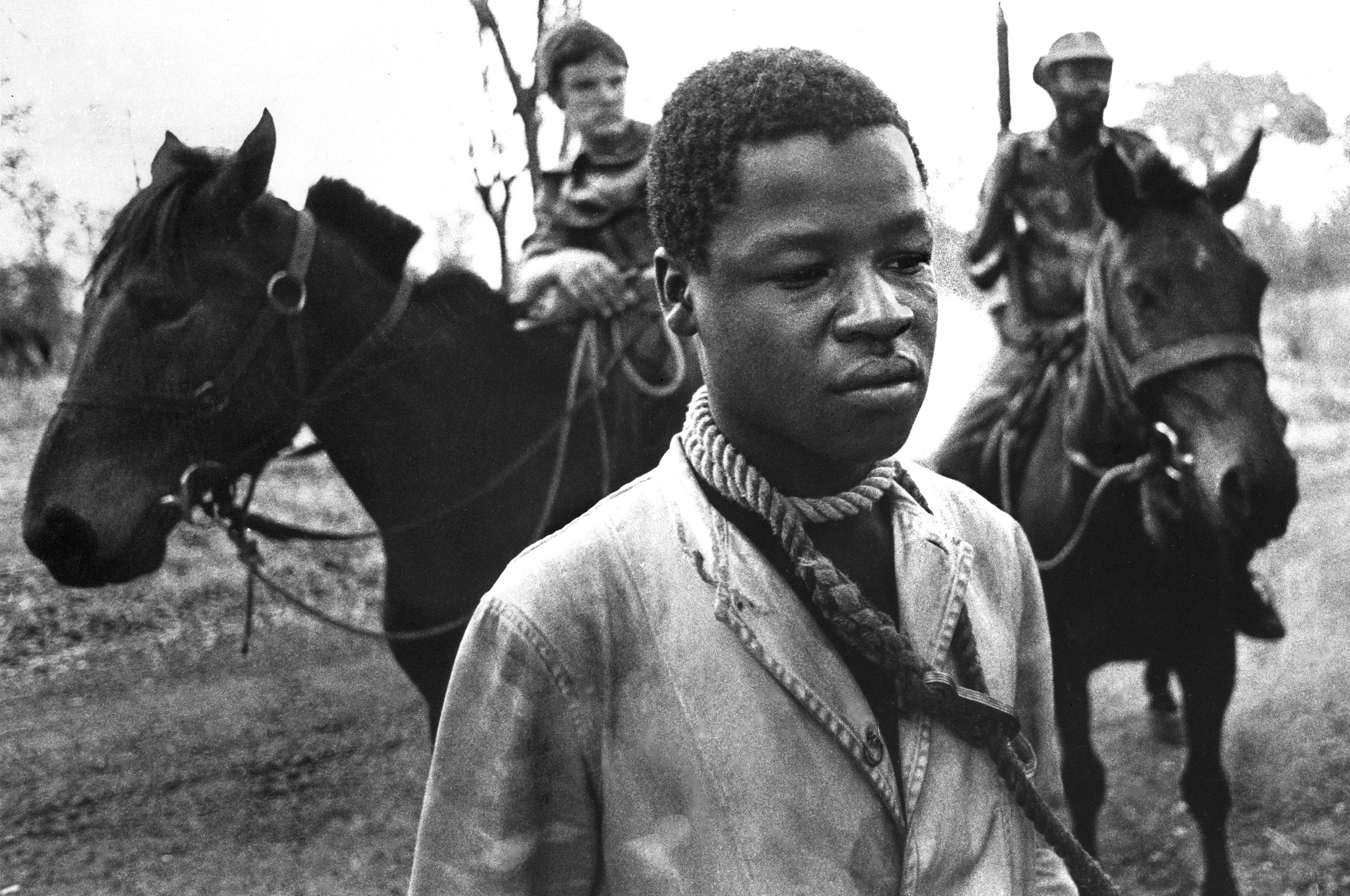
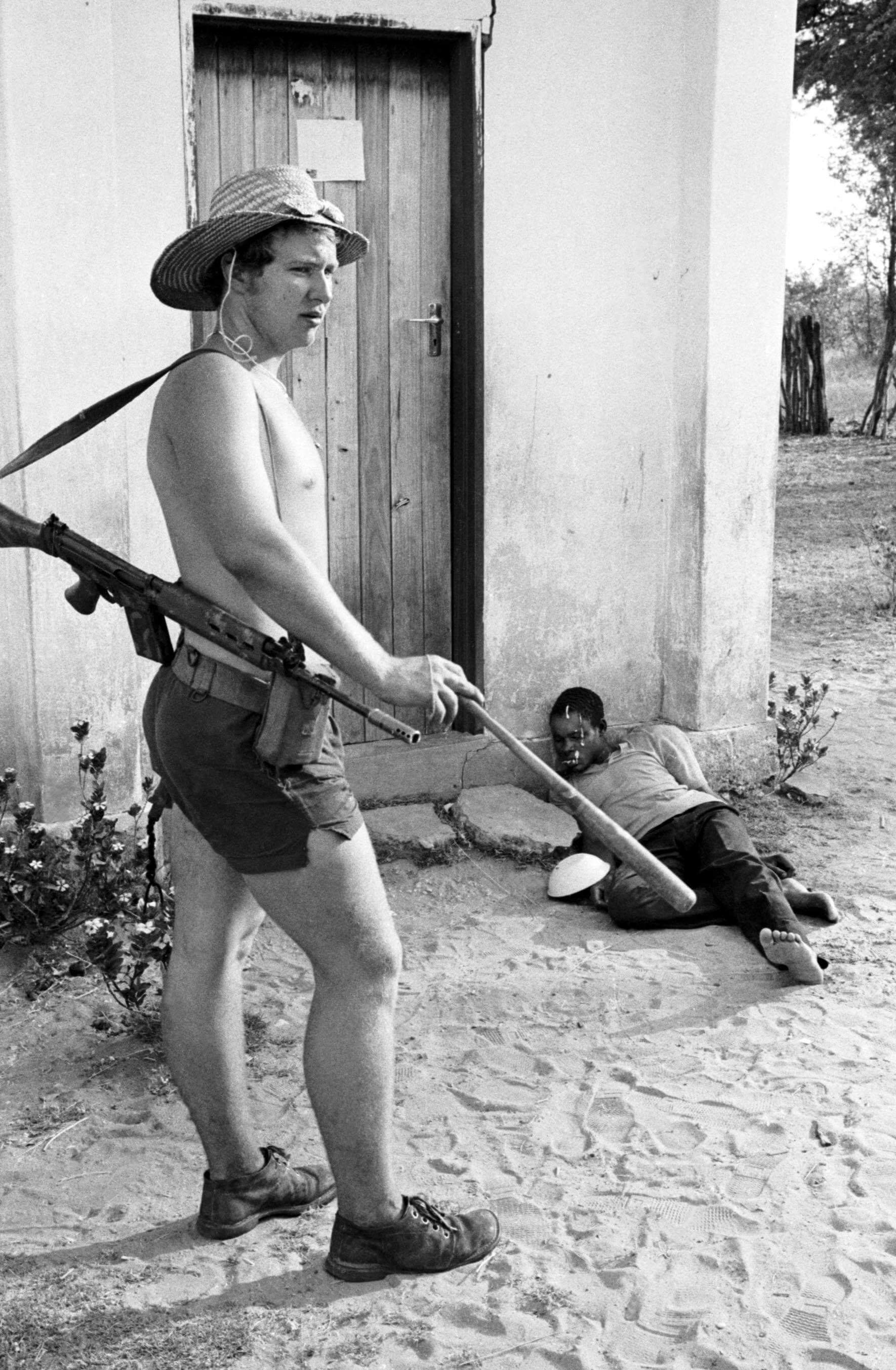
The prize-winning set of feature photographs
- Feature Photography:
  - J. Ross Baughman of Associated Press, for three photographs from guerrilla areas in Rhodesia.

== Letters, Drama and Music Awards ==
- Fiction:
  - Elbow Room by James Alan McPherson (Atlantic Monthly Press)
- Drama:
  - The Gin Game by Donald L. Coburn (Drama Book Specialists)
- History:
  - The Visible Hand: The Managerial Revolution in American Business by Alfred D. Chandler, Jr. (Belknap/Harvard University Press)
- Biography or Autobiography:
  - Samuel Johnson by Walter Jackson Bate (Harcourt)
- Poetry:
  - Collected Poems by Howard Nemerov (Univ. of Chicago)
- General Nonfiction:
  - The Dragons of Eden by Carl Sagan (Random House)
- Music:
  - Deja Vu for Percussion Quartet and Orchestra by Michael Colgrass (Carl Fischer Music)
    Commissioned by the New York Philharmonic and premiered by that orchestra October 20, 1977.

== Special Citations and Awards ==
- Journalism:
  - Richard Strout, for distinguished commentary from Washington over many years as staff correspondent for The Christian Science Monitor and contributor to The New Republic.
- Letters:
  - E. B. White, a special citation to E. B. White for his letters, essays and the full body his work.
