= Claire Lombardo =

American fiction writer

- Education: University of Illinois Chicago, University of Iowa
- Writing career
- Genre: Fiction
- Notable work: The Most Fun We Ever Had
- Website: www.clairelombardo.com

Claire Lombardo is an American writer. Her novel The Most Fun We Ever Had (2019) was a New York Times bestseller and was longlisted for the Women's Prize for Fiction.

== Early life ==
Lombardo studied at the University of Illinois Chicago and later attended the Iowa Writers' Workshop.

== The Most Fun We Ever Had ==
Claire Lombardo has said that she started The Most Fun We Ever Had as a short story. It was published as a novel, by Doubleday, in 2019.

The Observer wrote in a review: "If ever there were to be a literary love child of Jonathan Franzen and Anne Tyler, then Claire Lombardo's outstanding debut, which ranges from ebullience to despair by way of caustic but intense familial bonds, would be a worthy offspring." Booklist wrote: "Though it resembles other sprawling midwestern family dramas, like Jonathan Franzen's The Corrections, Lombardo's book steers clear of social critique and burrows into the drama of familial relationships."

The Wall Street Journal called it "an assured first novel", writing: "The strength of the book is in its unsentimental limning of the past, of dinner-table conversations, pillow talk, sisterly intrigues and alliances, of creaking floors and sheltering trees, of petty resentments and small rapprochements. The plot lines and complications are many—perhaps a bit too many. The cast is large. But Ms. Lombardo manages to keep all the balls in the air." For The Washington Post, it is "an ambitious and brilliantly written first novel, sometimes amusing and sometimes shocking, but its unrelenting nature and lack of context is ultimately off-putting."

The New York Times Book Review wrote: "Of course it's not the responsibility of every novel to wrestle with cultural shifts, with politics and war, but the near total absence of even a whiff of non-Sorenson-related events over 40 years and 500-plus pages must be a conscious choice. It reads, eventually, as a deliberate and fascinating commentary on how a particular kind of moneyed white family can choose the degree to which they engage with such. . . unpleasantries."

NPR described it as "a wonderfully immersive read that packs more heart and heft than most first novels. . . notably apolitical, all-white, all-straight", adding that it "is operatic in both good ways and bad."

In 2019, the novel was reported to be in development at HBO, with actors Amy Adams and Laura Dern as executive producers. As of six years later (January 2025), no such adaptation had been aired.

== Bibliography ==
- The Most Fun We Ever Had (Doubleday, 2019)
- Same As It Ever Was (Doubleday, 2024)
