= Glacier Point Hotel =

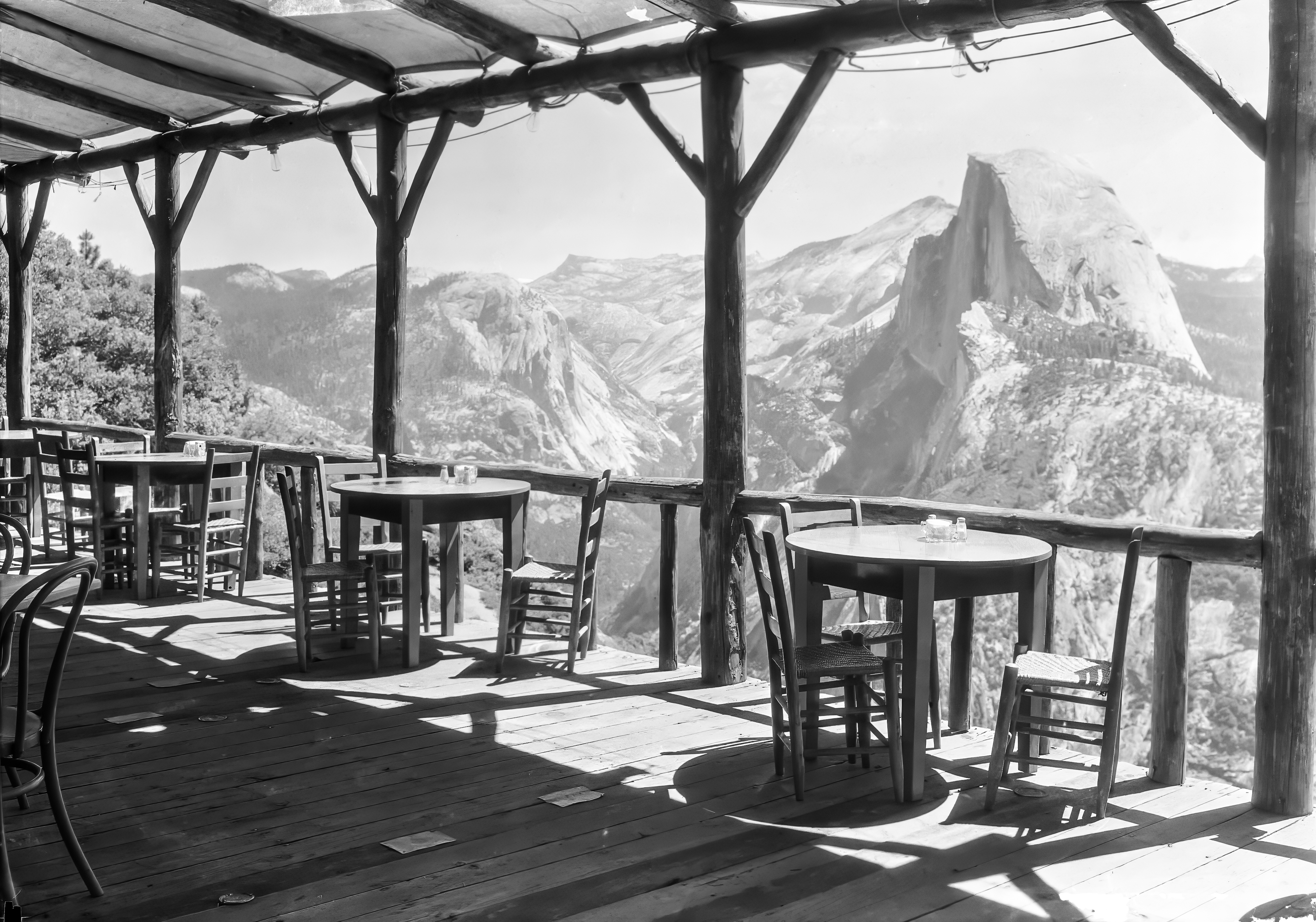
- The Glacier Point Hotel veranda.
- Interactive map of the Glacier Point Hotel area

General information
- Location: Glacier Point, Yosemite National Park, California, United States
- Coordinates: 37.73083°N 119.57278°W
- Opening: 1918
- Closed: July 9, 1969
- Operator: Yosemite Park & Curry Company

Technical details
- Floor count: 3

Design and construction
- Architect: Daniel Gutlebin
- Developer: The Desmond Park Service Company

Other information
- Number of rooms: 80

The Glacier Point Hotel was a rustic-style, chalet-style hotel at Glacier Point in Yosemite National Park, California. Built at 7,240 feet (2,207 m) above sea level, it was the highest-elevation hotel in the West. It operated seasonally above Yosemite Valley and was the site from which the Yosemite Firefall originated. The hotel was damaged by heavy snowfall during the winter of 1968–69 and destroyed by fire in July 1969.

Later proposals to develop Glacier Point included a new hotel and an aerial tramway connecting the point with Yosemite Valley, but neither was built.

== History ==
Glacier Point Hotel, at 7,240 feet (2,210 m) above sea level, was the highest-elevation hotel in the West. Built in 1917, it stood 3,274 feet (998 m) above Yosemite Valley and was anchored by a large double-sided fireplace in its lobby. The hotel overlooked Yosemite Valley, with views of Half Dome.

=== Construction ===
The hotel cost $250,000 to build (equivalent to $6,280,000 in 2025) and had 125 rooms, which rented for $4 to $5 per night (equivalent to $101 to $126 in 2025). The Desmond Park Service Company and Gutleben Brothers used more than 100 mules, along with trucks, to transport construction materials to the site. Lumber used in construction was cut from trees near the hotel.

The hotel's centerpiece was a large fireplace carved from a single nearby boulder, weighing 2,462,000 pounds (1,117,000 kg)—an amount of granite comparable to that used in a six-room house. The main building featured dining and lounge spaces. Advertising emphasized the hotel's broad viewing porch, which opened onto sweeping views across Yosemite Valley toward Half Dome.

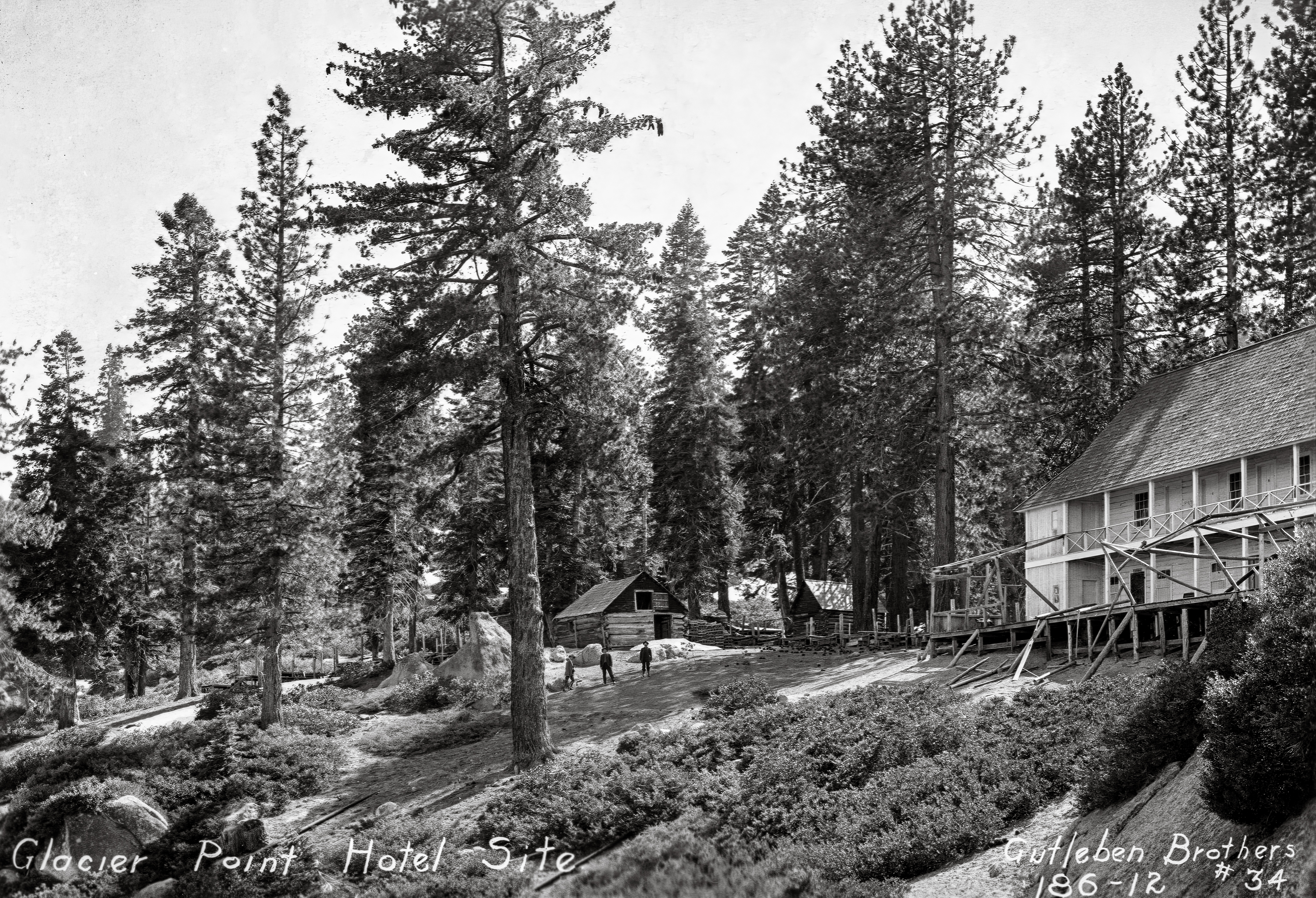
Mountain House (right) with the future location of Glacier Point Hotel.

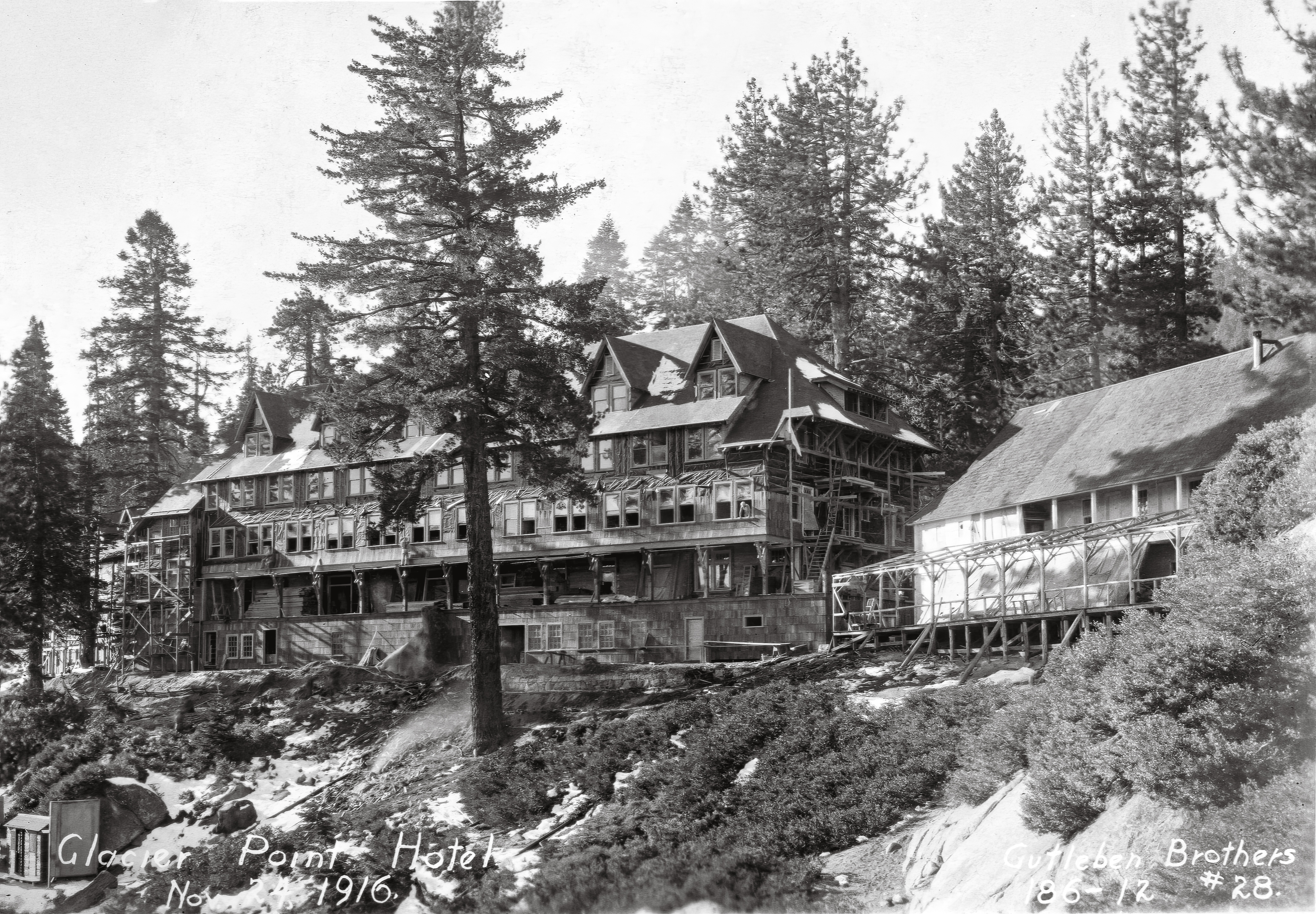
Glacier Point Hotel in 1916.

The hotel sat adjacent to the Mountain House, a rustic tavern built by innkeeper Charles Perego at the overlook in 1873. In the years following the opening of the Glacier Point Hotel, the Mountain House was used for employee housing and put into service as a public cafeteria.

=== Yosemite Park & Curry Company ===
In 1920, DJ Desmond stretched his company's finances too thin, which led to the firm being reorganized by ABC Dohrmann and Larry Harris, both prominent San Francisco businessmen. They reformed it under the name of the Yosemite National Park Company. Four years later, in 1924, the government mandated a merger between the Curry Company and the Yosemite National Park Company. This merger led to the creation of the Yosemite Park and Curry Company, which subsequently took ownership of the Glacier Point Hotel.

== Firefall ==
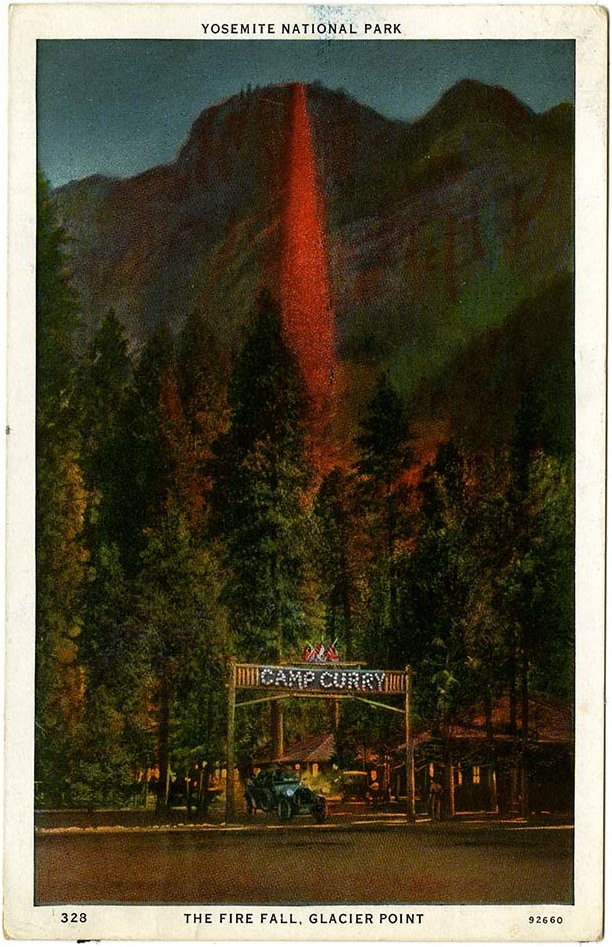
The Fire Fall originating from the Glacier Point Hotel.

Beginning in the 1920s, the guests of the Glacier Point Hotel would witness and participate in the Yosemite Firefall. What was once a summer event would gradually become daily routine. At 9:00 every night, hotel employees would push burning embers off Glacier Point to fall 3,000 feet (910 m) down and mark the end of a performance at Camp Curry on the valley floor. As the coals fell in a set pattern, the resulting shower would closely resemble a burning waterfall. This tradition would continue until the last firefall on Thursday, January 25, 1968.

== Operations ==
Although the Glacier Point Hotel was in an excellent location, it still struggled as a business. High room costs would continually leave several rooms vacant, but this would slowly change as the hotel gained favor with the increasing numbers of tourists.

During its seasonal operation, the Glacier Point Hotel opened from late spring to early autumn, from May 15 to October 1. Visitors could reach the hotel from Yosemite Valley via horseback or a 4-mile hiking trip. From around June 15, daily automobile stage services were also available for access.

To improve access, the idea of an elevator carved into the cliffside was briefly considered as a solution to bypass the arduous four-mile hike or two-hour car journey from the valley. However, the hotel persistently struggled with water shortages, often leading to early closures in August.

Winter presented its own challenges. The frequent snowfalls in the area necessitated constant attention due to the hotel's light construction. Maintenance workers often lived on-site, their main task being to clear the roofs of snow to prevent them from collapsing under its weight.

The remote hotel was perpetually threatened by wildfires. In 1936, a potentially destructive fire was successfully extinguished, preventing damage to the hotel.

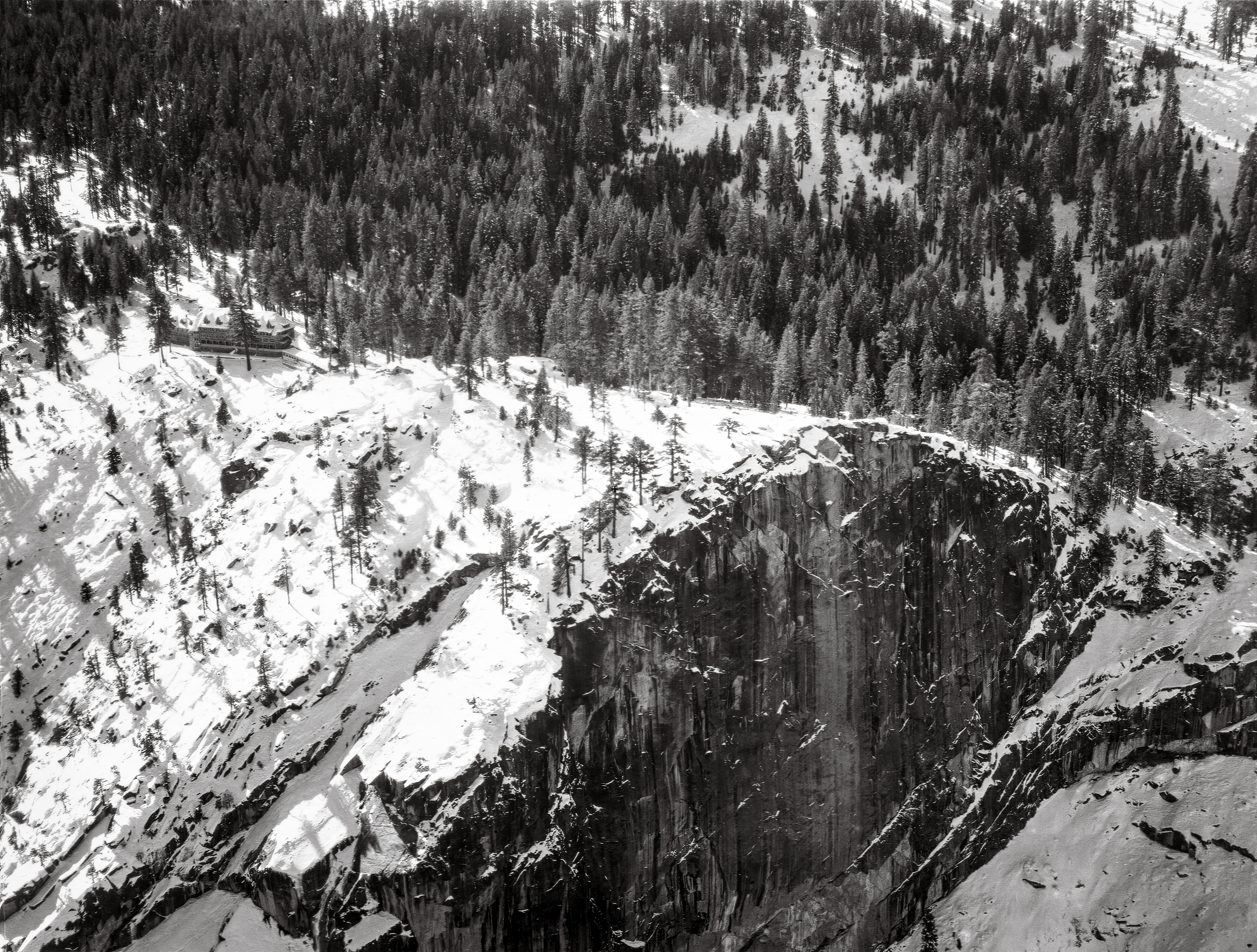
Glacier Point Hotel from the air.

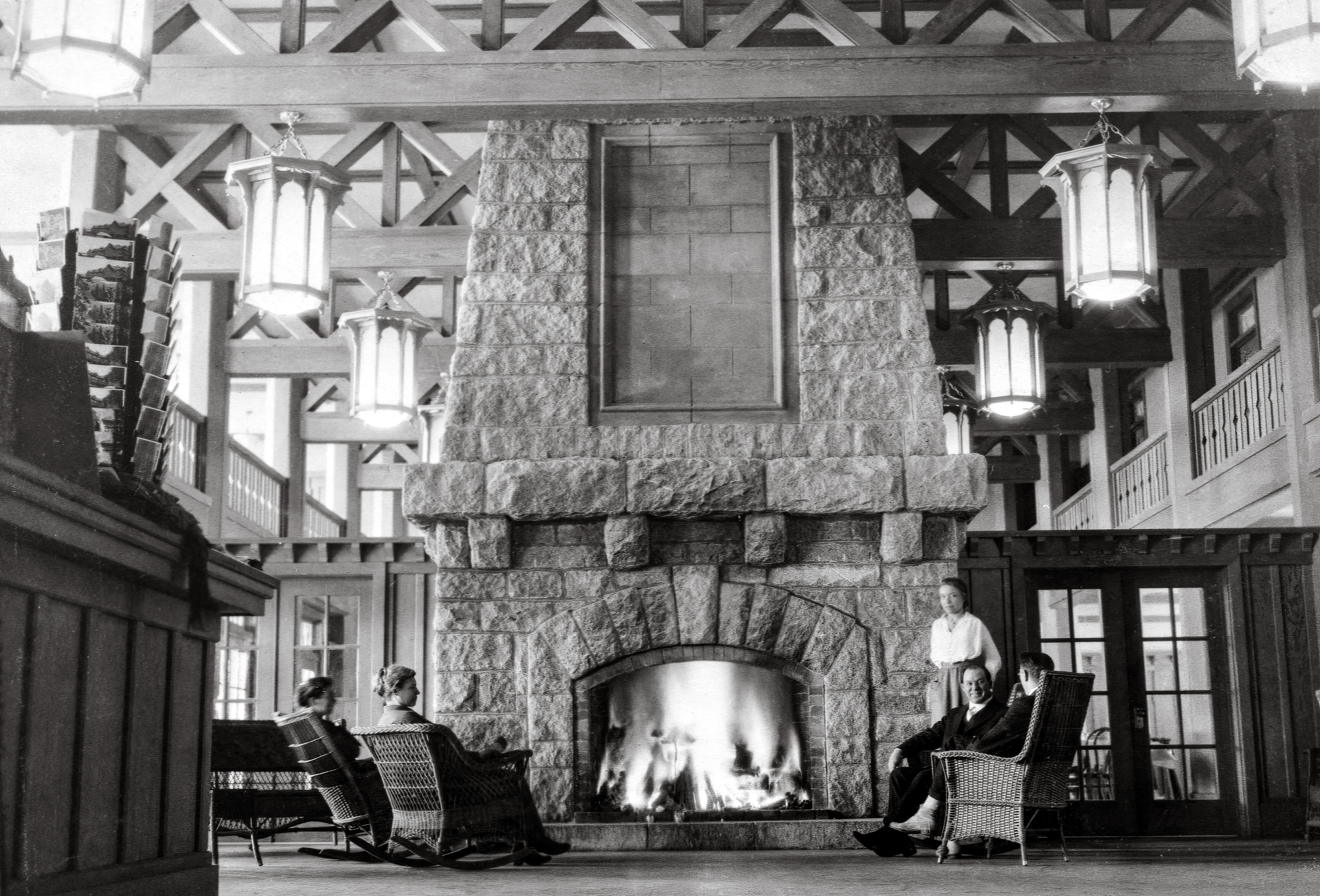
The double-sided fireplace, carved from a nearby boulder.

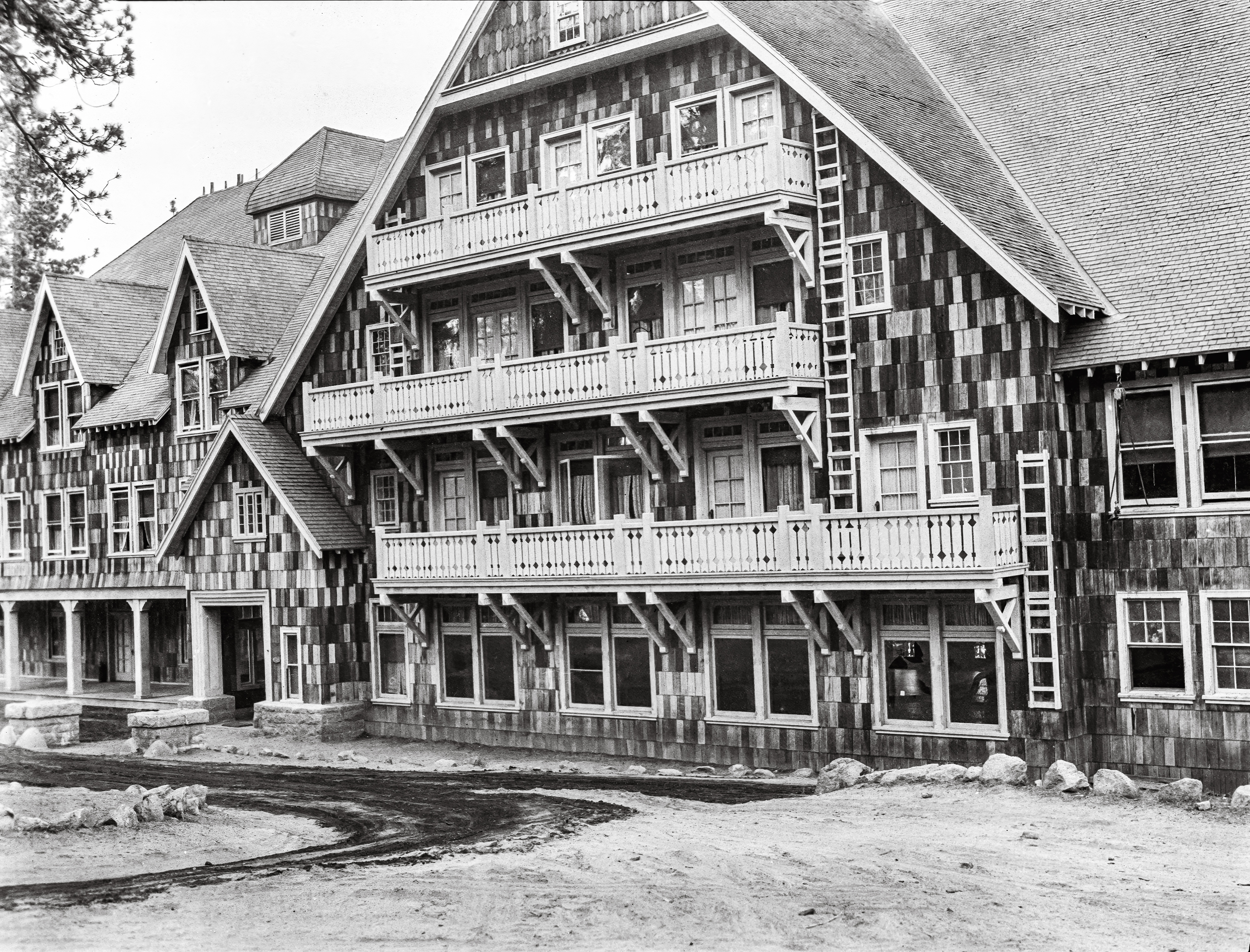
Chalet-style architecture.

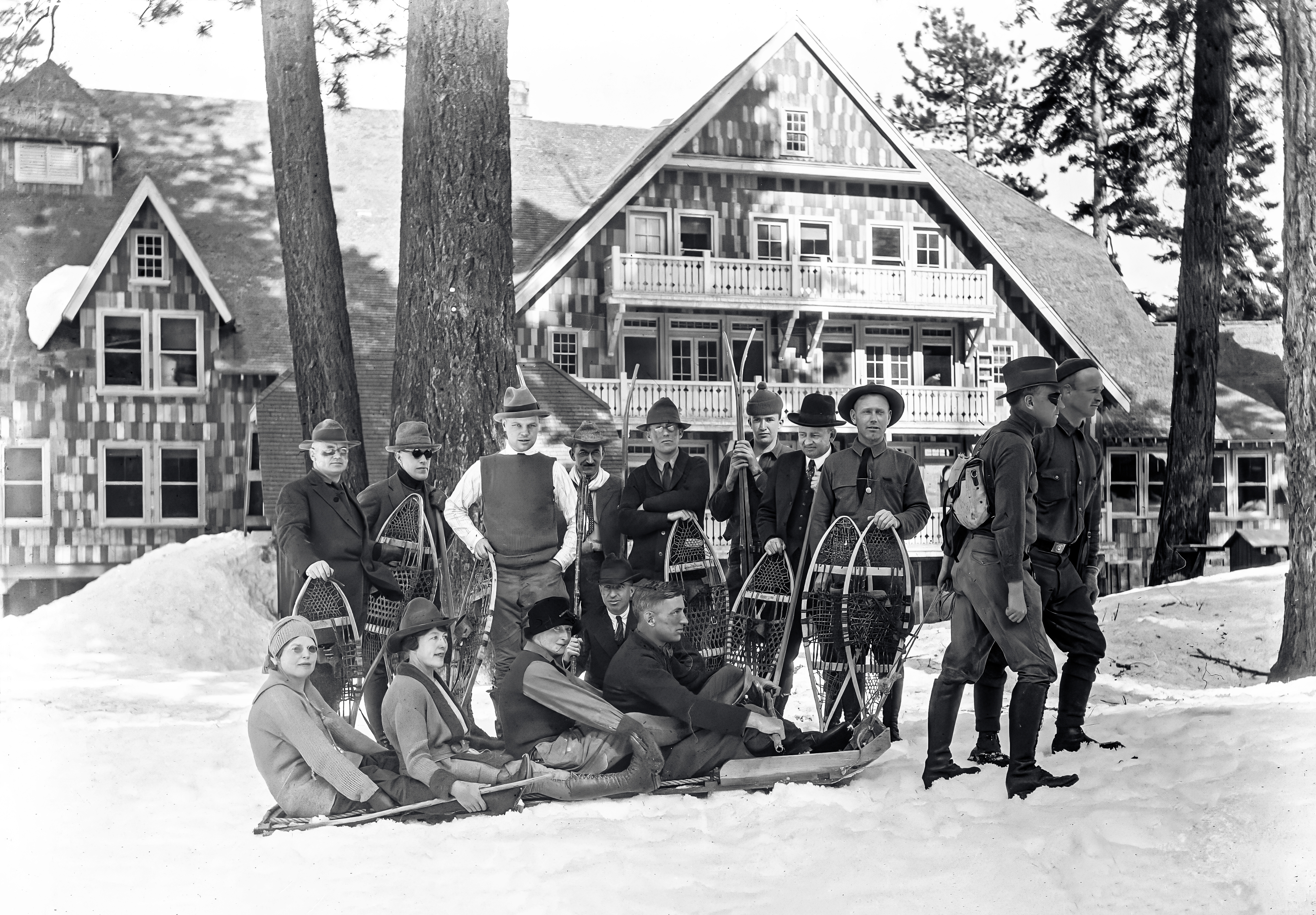
Snowshoeing in winter.

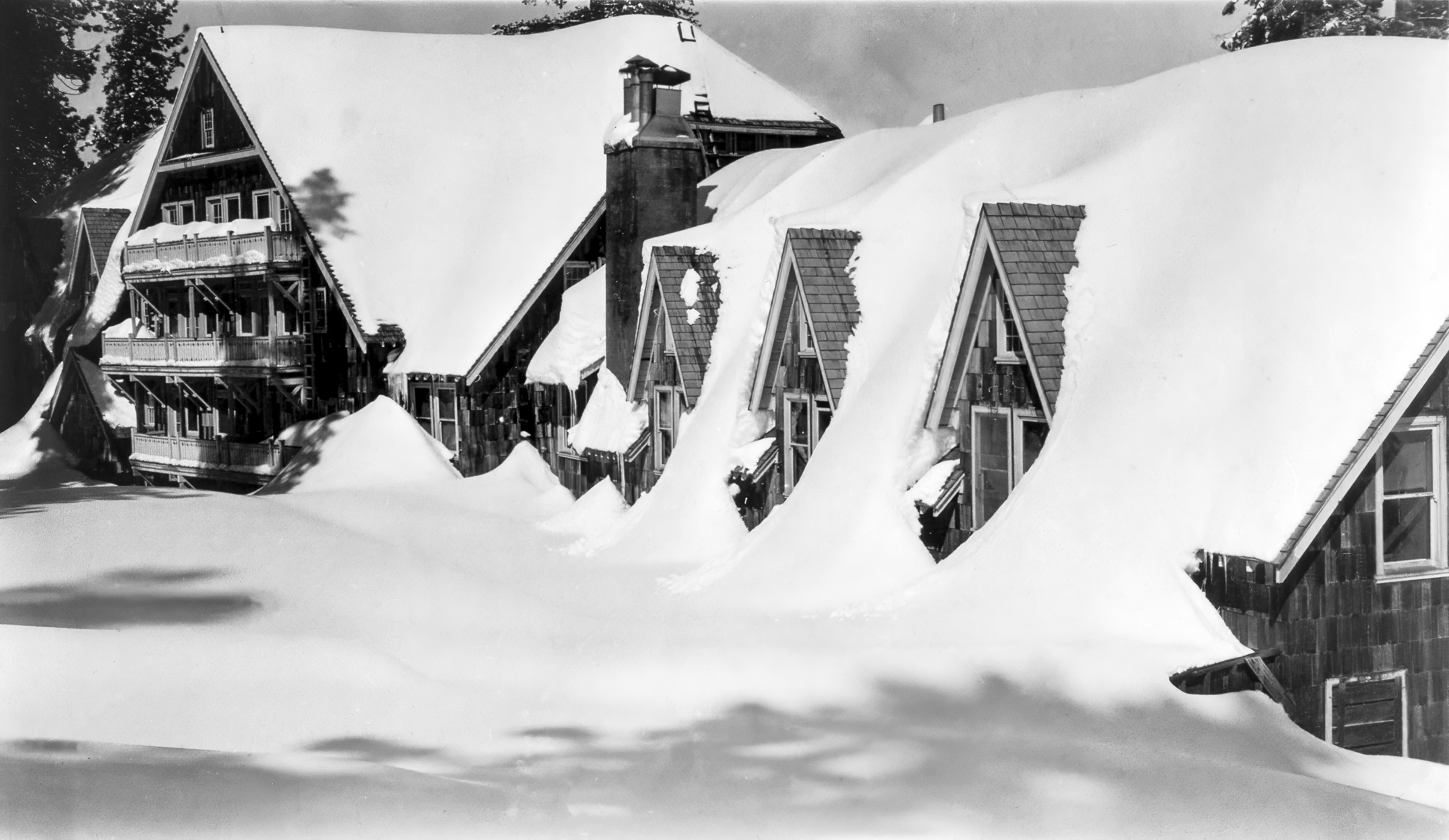
Heavy snowfall reaching the second story.

== Final Years ==
During the winter of 1969, the hotel, along with the McCauley Mountain House, was severely damaged by snowfall. While repairs to the structures were performed, no guest reservations were booked, and the employees used the Mountain House to sell snacks to Glacier Point visitors.

On July 9, 1969, an electrical fire started on the bottom floor of the still-unoccupied hotel. Within minutes, the Glacier Point Hotel, along with the Mountain House and several trees, was destroyed. A nearby stockpile of Red Fir left over from the firefall helped feed the flames. After the incident, visitors were kept away from Glacier Point as demolition crews removed the remaining debris.

YPCC considered rebuilding a hotel at Glacier Point, but the Park Service would not permit rebuilding at the same location; it would have to be placed farther back from the precipice.

== Proposed redevelopment ==
In 1974, MCA, an entertainment conglomerate which had acquired the Yosemite Park and Curry Company, put forward a proposal to construct the Glacier Park Tramway. The proposed aerial tramway was intended to create a connection between the valley floor and a newly reconstructed Glacier Point Hotel. MCA, also the operator of Universal theme parks, faced substantial opposition to their plan.

Prominent organizations like the Sierra Club, alongside many private citizens, mounted a vigorous campaign against the plan, petitioning the federal government to intervene and limit the scope of the project. John Burton, U.S. House of Representatives member for San Francisco, voiced his opinion on the Yosemite situation, stating, "Natural areas like Yosemite should remain in the natural state and not be transformed into Disneylands. They are public reserves, not to be exploited."

As a result of these objections, the Yosemite General Management Plan was enacted in September 1980. This plan crucially incorporated permanent restrictions designed to prevent future commercial development at Glacier Point.

== Legacy ==
In later years, a granite amphitheater was built on the site of the hotel, and a new visitor center was completed nearby. These changes were part of a 1996-1997 modernization effort to transform the heavily traveled path. Even so, some evidence of the Glacier Point Hotel, such as some of the old foundations, are still evident.

== See also ==
- Yosemite Firefall
- Glacier Point
- Many Glacier Hotel

== Bibliography ==
- Radanovich, Walter. Yosemite National Park and Vicinity. Arcadia Publishing, 2006
