= James Alan McPherson =

American essayist and short-story writer

- Born: September 16, 1943; Savannah, Georgia, U.S.
- Died: July 27, 2016 (aged 72); Iowa City, Iowa, U.S.
- Education: Morgan State University; Morris Brown College (BA); Harvard University (LLB); University of Iowa (MFA)
- Spouse: Sarah Charlton (div)
- Children: 2
- Writing career
- Period: 1968–2016
- Genre: Fiction
- Notable work: Elbow Room
- Notable awards: Pulitzer Prize in Fiction; MacArthur Fellowship; Guggenheim Fellowship

James Alan McPherson (September 16, 1943 – July 27, 2016) was an American essayist and short-story writer. He was the first African-American writer to win the Pulitzer Prize for Fiction, and was included among the first group of artists who received a MacArthur Fellowship. At the time of his death, McPherson was a professor emeritus of fiction at the Iowa Writers' Workshop.

== Life and work ==
=== Early life and education ===
McPherson was born in Savannah, Georgia, on September 16, 1943, the second of four children. His father was a master electrician (the first African-American so recognized in Georgia), and his mother (born Mabel Small) was a maid. While McPherson was growing up, his father struggled with alcohol and spent time in jail. In the essay "Going Up To Atlanta," McPherson describes the many odd jobs he took on during this time to help support his mother, brother, and sisters. But it was his discovery of the "colored branch" of the public library that changed his life. When he started reading books, McPherson learned that words, even without pictures, "gave up their secret meanings, spoke of other worlds, made me know that pain was a part of other people's lives."

He attended Morgan State University from 1963 to 1964 before receiving his undergraduate degree in history and English from Morris Brown College in 1965. In 1968, McPherson received a LL.B. from Harvard Law School, where he partially financed his studies by working as a janitor.

While at Harvard, McPherson studied fiction writing with Alan Lebowitz in 1967 and worked on his stories when he found some spare time. It was the publication of his short story "Gold Coast" in The Atlantic Monthly, following an "open reading" competition they had sponsored, that first brought him public recognition. During this period, McPherson established a close working relationship with Edward Weeks, an editor at The Atlantic Monthly, which led to McPherson becoming a contributing editor at that magazine in 1969. His fiction would go on to appear in numerous journals and magazines throughout the following decade. Many of his stories were anthologized, beginning with "Gold Coast" when it appeared in The Best American Stories in 1969. His first collection of short stories, Hue and Cry, was published by Atlantic Monthly Press that year.

In 1971, he received an M.F.A. in fiction from the Iowa Writers' Workshop, where he studied briefly with the short-story writer and novelist Richard Yates. While studying creative writing, McPherson decided not to practice law; however, he would continue to utilize his legal training in various projects. In a 1972 Atlantic Monthly essay, he exposed exploitative business practices against black homeowners, presaging the later work of Ta-Nehisi Coates.

During this period in his life, he gained the attention of Ralph Ellison (1913–1994), who became both a friend and mentor to the young McPherson. In December 1970, McPherson interviewed Ellison for an Atlantic Monthly cover story and collaborated with him on the essay "Invisible Man." This relationship with Ellison would have a lasting influence on his own life and work, as McPherson acknowledges in his essay "Gravitas," which he published in 1999 as both a tribute to the (then) recently deceased writer, and to observe the posthumous publication of Ellison's novel Juneteenth that same year. McPherson also initiated a friendship with Albert Murray shortly after the publication of Murray's The Omni-Americans: Black Experience & American Culture (1970).

=== Career ===
McPherson taught English and creative writing at the University of California, Santa Cruz (assistant professor; 1969–1971), the Harvard University summer school (1972), Morgan State University (assistant professor; 1975–1976) and the University of Virginia (associate professor; 1976–1981) before joining the Iowa Writers' Workshop in 1981, with whom he was associated for the remainder of his life. He served as acting director of the program for two years following the death of Frank Conroy in 2005. Following the publication of Elbow Room (his final collection of fiction) in 1977, McPherson primarily focused on his teaching career, with the Chicago Tribune characterizing him as being "only slightly more gregarious than J.D. Salinger."

He was also a visiting scholar at Yale Law School (1978–1979) and a fellow at Stanford University's Center for Advanced Study in the Behavioral Sciences (1997–1998; 2002–2003). Significantly, McPherson lectured in Japan (at Meiji University and Chiba University), a country whose society and culture profoundly affected him. It was in Japan, he once wrote, where he went to lay down "the burden carried by all black Americans, especially the males."

Crabcakes: A Memoir, his first original work since Elbow Room, was published in 1998. His final book (A Region Not Home: Reflections on Exile, an essay collection) was published in 2000.

== Recognition ==
In 1972, McPherson was awarded a Guggenheim Fellowship. He received the Pulitzer Prize in 1978 for his short story collection Elbow Room, becoming the first black writer to receive the program's Fiction Prize.

He was the recipient of a MacArthur Fellowship in 1981, a member of the first group (21 recipients in all) ever selected for one of the MacArthur Foundation's so-called "genius grants." In 1995, McPherson was inducted into the American Academy of Arts and Sciences. In 2000, John Updike selected McPherson's short story "Gold Coast" for his collection Best American Short Stories of the Century (Houghton Mifflin).

In October 2011, McPherson was honored as the inaugural recipient of the Paul Engle Award from the Iowa City UNESCO City of Literature. According to the citation:

The Engle Award honors an individual who, like Engle, longtime director of the Iowa Writers' Workshop and co-founder of the International Writing Program at the University of Iowa, represents a pioneering spirit in the world of literature through writing, editing, publishing, or teaching, and whose active participation in the larger issues of the day has contributed to the betterment of the world through the literary arts.

In 2020, an Iowa City park was renovated and renamed after McPherson. Previously Creekside Park, James Alan McPherson Park serves as a memorial and a gathering space for the community.

== Death ==
McPherson died in hospice on July 27, 2016, in Iowa City, Iowa, due to complications of pneumonia. He was 72. He is survived by a daughter, Rachel McPherson (a child from his first marriage to the former Sarah Charlton, which had ended in divorce); a son from another relationship, Benjamin Miyamoto; a sister; and a brother.

== Works ==
=== Fiction ===
- Hue and Cry: Stories (New York: Atlantic Monthly Press, 1969) ISBN 9780316563260 (Note: Edition currently in print: Harper Perennial, trade paper; ISBN 9780060936471)
- Elbow Room: Stories (New York: Atlantic-Little, Brown, 1977) ISBN 0316563285 (Note: Edition currently in print: Fawcett Books, Mass Market paperback; ISBN 9780449213575)

=== Nonfiction ===
- Railroad: Trains and Train People in American Culture, edited with Miller Williams; (New York: Random House, 1976); ISBN 0394732375
- Confronting Racial Difference, edited with DeWitt Henry; Ploughshares Vol. 16, Nos 2 & 3 (Fall 1990); ISBN 0933277946
- Fathering Daughters: Reflections by Men, edited with DeWitt Henry; (Boston, MA: Beacon Press, 1998); ISBN 9780807062197
- Crabcakes: A Memoir (New York: Simon & Schuster, 1998); ISBN 0684834650
- A Region Not Home: Reflections on Exile (New York: Simon & Schuster, 2000); ISBN 9780684834641 (Note: A collection of cultural and personal essays)
- On Becoming an American Writer: Essays & Nonfiction, selected and introduced by Anthony Walton (Boston, MA: Godine, 2023); ISBN 978-1-56792-748-1

=== Stories ===
Title	Publication	Collected in
"Gold Coast"	The Atlantic (November 1968)	Hue and Cry
"A Matter of Vocabulary"	The Atlantic (February 1969)	Hue and Cry
"Of Cabbages and Kings"	The Atlantic (April 1969)	Hue and Cry
"On Trains"	Hue and Cry (Summer 1969)	Hue and Cry
"A Solo Song: For Doc"	Hue and Cry (Summer 1969)	Hue and Cry
"All the Lonely People"	Hue and Cry (Summer 1969)	Hue and Cry
"An Act of Prostitution"	Hue and Cry (Summer 1969)	Hue and Cry
"Private Domain"	Hue and Cry (Summer 1969)	Hue and Cry
"A New Place"	Hue and Cry (Summer 1969)	Hue and Cry
"Hue and Cry"	Hue and Cry (Summer 1969)	Hue and Cry
"The Silver Bullet"	Playboy (July 1972)	Elbow Room
"The Faithful"	The Atlantic (April 1973)	Elbow Room
"The Story of a Scar"	The Atlantic (December 1973)	Elbow Room
"Why I Like Country Music"	The Harvard Advocate (Winter 1974)	Elbow Room
"I Am an American"	Ploughshares 2.2 (1974)	Elbow Room
"Problems of Art"	The Iowa Review 6.2 (Spring 1975)	Elbow Room
"A Sense of Story"	The Massachusetts Review 18.3 (Autumn 1977)	Elbow Room
"The Story of a Dead Man"	Elbow Room (Autumn 1977)	Elbow Room
"Widows and Orphans"	Elbow Room (Autumn 1977)	Elbow Room
"A Loaf of Bread"	Elbow Room (Autumn 1977)	Elbow Room
"Just Enough for the City"	Elbow Room (Autumn 1977)	Elbow Room
"Elbow Room"	Elbow Room (Autumn 1977)	Elbow Room
"There Was Once a State Called Franklin"	Callaloo 2.2 (May 1979)	-
