= Firefall (poetry collection) =

1992 poetry collection by Mona Van Duy

Firefall (December 7, 1992) is a collection of poetry by American poet Mona Van Duyn (1921-2004). It was the last collection of poems to be published during the poet's lifetime.
