= Mona Van Duyn =

American poet (1921–2004)

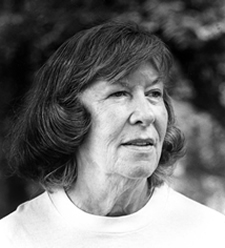
- Van Duyn in 1992 or 1993
- Born: May 9, 1921; Waterloo, Iowa, US
- Died: December 2, 2004 (aged 83); University City, Missouri, US
- Education: University of Northern Iowa (BA); University of Iowa (MA)
- Occupations: Poet; Professor
- Employer(s): University of Louisville; Washington University in St. Louis
- Title: United States Poet Laureate
- Term: 1992-1993
- Awards: National Book Award (1971); Bollingen Prize (1971); Ruth Lilly Poetry Prize (1989); Pulitzer Prize (1991)

Mona Jane Van Duyn (May 9, 1921 – December 2, 2004) was an American poet. She was appointed United States Poet Laureate in 1992.

== Biography ==
=== Early years ===
Van Duyn was born May 9, 1921, in Waterloo, Iowa. She grew up in the small town of Eldora (pop. 3,200) where she read voraciously in the town library and wrote poems secretly in notebooks from her grade school years to her high school years. Van Duyn earned a B.A. from Iowa State Teachers College in 1942, and an M.A. from the State University of Iowa in 1943, the year she married Jarvis Thurston. She and Thurston studied in the Ph.D. program at Iowa. In 1946 she was hired as an instructor at the University of Louisville when her husband became an assistant professor there. Together they began Perspective: A Quarterly of Literature and the Arts in 1947, which she edited for the next twenty years. They shifted that journal to Washington University in St. Louis when they moved there in 1950.

=== Academic career ===
In St. Louis, Van Duyn taught English from 1950 to 1967 at Washington University. Thurston became chair of the Washington University Department of English, and Van Duyn and Thurston drew to St. Louis and presided over what would become a unique literary circle of creative writers and critics. (It included poet Howard Nemerov, novelist and critic William Gass, novelist Stanley Elkin, poets Donald Finkel and John Morris, critic Richard Stang, authors Wayne Fields and Naomi Lebowitz, and others.) Continuing to edit Perspective until it ceased publication in 1975, they are recognized for their role in fostering literary talent nationwide and for publishing early works by Anthony Hecht, W. S. Merwin, Douglas Woolf, and many others. Van Duyn was a friend of poet James Merrill and instrumental in securing his papers for the Washington University Special Collections in the mid-1960s. She was a lecturer in the University College of Washington University in St. Louis until her retirement in 1990. In 1983, a year after she had published her fifth book of poems, she was named adjunct professor in the English Department and became the "Visiting Hurst Professor" in 1987, the year she was invited to be a member of the National Institute of Arts and Letters.

=== Career as a poet ===
Van Duyn won every major U.S. prize for poetry, including the National Book Award (1971) for To See, To Take, the Bollingen Prize (1971), the Ruth Lilly Poetry Prize (1989), and the Pulitzer Prize (1991) for Near Changes. She was the U.S. Poet Laureate between 1992 and 1993. Despite her accolades, her career fluctuated between praise and obscurity. Her views of love and marriage ranged from the scathing to the optimistic. In "What I Want to Say", she wrote of love:

It is the absolute narrowing of possibilities
and everyone, down to the last man
dreads it

But in "Late Loving", she wrote:

Love is finding the familiar dear

To See, To Take (1970) was a collection of poems that gathered together three previous books and some uncollected work and won the National Book Award for Poetry. In 1981 she became a fellow in the Academy of American Poets and then, in 1985, one of the twelve Chancellors who serve for life. Collected poems, If It Be Not I (1992) included four volumes that had appeared since her first collected poems. It was published simultaneously with a new collection of poetry, Firefall.

In 1993, she was inducted into the St. Louis Walk of Fame. She was elected a Fellow of the American Academy of Arts and Sciences in 1996. She died of bone cancer at her home in University City, Missouri, on December 2, 2004, aged 83.

== Works ==
- Valentines to the Wide World (The Cummington Press), 1959.
- A Time of Bees (University of North Carolina Press), 1964.
- To See, To Take: Poems (Atheneum), 1970 —winner of the 1971 National Book Award for Poetry
- Bedtime Stories (Ceres Press), 1972.
- Merciful Disguises:: Poems Published and Unpublished (Atheneum), 1973.
- Letters From a Father, and Other Poems (Atheneum), 1982.
- Near Changes (Knopf), 1990 —winner of the 1991 Pulitzer Prize for Poetry
- Firefall (Knopf), 1992.
- If It Be Not I: Collected Poems, 1959–1982 (Knopf), 1994.
- Selected Poems (Knopf), 2003.
