= Horsetail Fall (Yosemite) =

Waterfall in California, United States

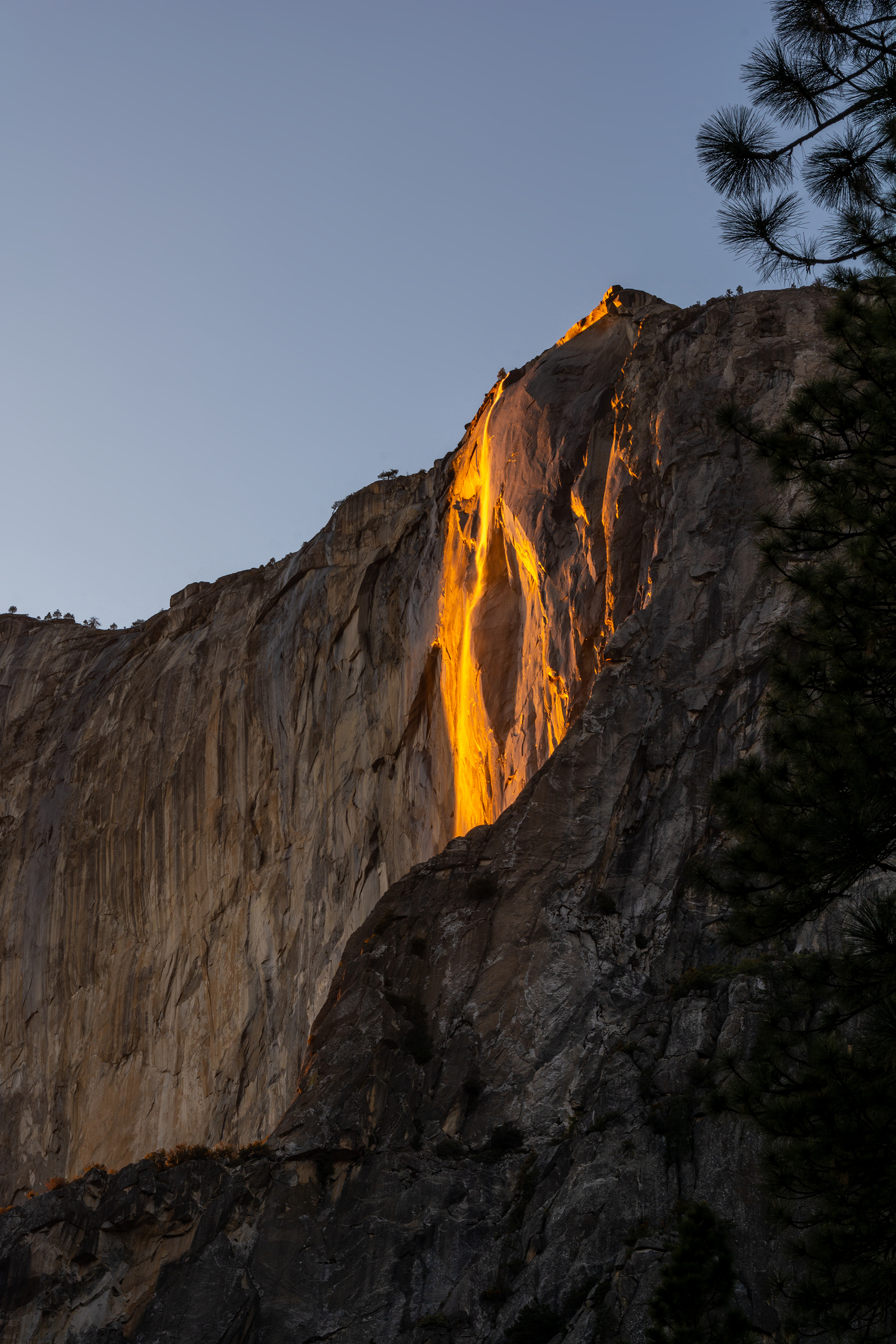
- Horsetail Fall illuminated by the setting sun
- Interactive map of Horsetail Fall
- Location: Yosemite National Park, California, United States
- Coordinates: 37.7291°N 119.6284°W
- Type: Horsetail
- Total height: 2,130 ft (650 m)
- Number of drops: 2
- Longest drop: 1,570 ft (480 m)
- Average flow rate: very slight flows a few weeks in normal years

Horsetail Fall, located in Yosemite National Park in California, is a seasonal waterfall that flows in the winter and early spring. The fall occurs on the east side of El Capitan. If Horsetail Fall is flowing in February and the weather conditions are just right, the setting sun illuminates the waterfall, making it glow orange and red. This natural phenomenon is often referred to as the "Firefall", a name that pays homage to Yosemite Firefall, the manmade event that once took place in Yosemite.

== Descriptions ==
The waterfall is fed by rain or snowmelt. It descends in two streams side by side, the eastern one being the larger but both quite small. The eastern one drops 1,540 ft (470 m), and the western one 1,570 ft (480 m), the second highest fully airborne waterfall in Yosemite that runs at some point every year (the highest being Ribbon Fall.) The waters then gather and descend another 490 ft (150 m) on steep slabs, so the total height of these waterfalls is 2,030 ft (620 m) to 2,070 ft (630 m). It can be seen and photographed from a small clearing close to the picnic area on the north road leading out of Yosemite Valley east of El Capitan. The fall is sometimes referred to as an ephemeral fall because of its seasonal nature.

== Firefall ==
For a couple of weeks in mid- to late- February, the fall may be lit up by the setting sun, creating the illusion of a blazing waterfall. This evening spectacle, which lasts around 10 minutes in good viewing conditions, is commonly referred to as the "firefall". The phenomenon requires enough water to create the fall, a clear sky, and the right angle for the sunlight to illuminate the fall. It is not observable every year.

The phenomenon was photographed by Ansel Adams in 1940, but made more widely-known by Galen Rowell who photographed it for the National Geographic in 1973. Viewing of the Firefall increased in popularity due to its images being shared on social media, and optimal dates for its viewing are published. The popularity of the phenomenon to photographers has resulted in large congregations of people, which caused damage to sensitive vegetation, and led to the National Park Service closing two of the three best viewing sites in 2020.

== See also ==
- List of waterfalls
