= Near Changes =

1990 poetry collection by Mona Van Duyn

Near Changes is a 1990 collection of poems by Mona Van Duyn (1921–2004). It was awarded the Pulitzer Prize for Poetry in 1991.

The poems express appreciation for a range of subjects (such as Fibonacci, a giraffe, and zinnias), with a range of poetic forms (including villanelles, couplets, and a sestina).
