= Yosemite Firefall =

Summer event of spilling embers in Yosemite National Park

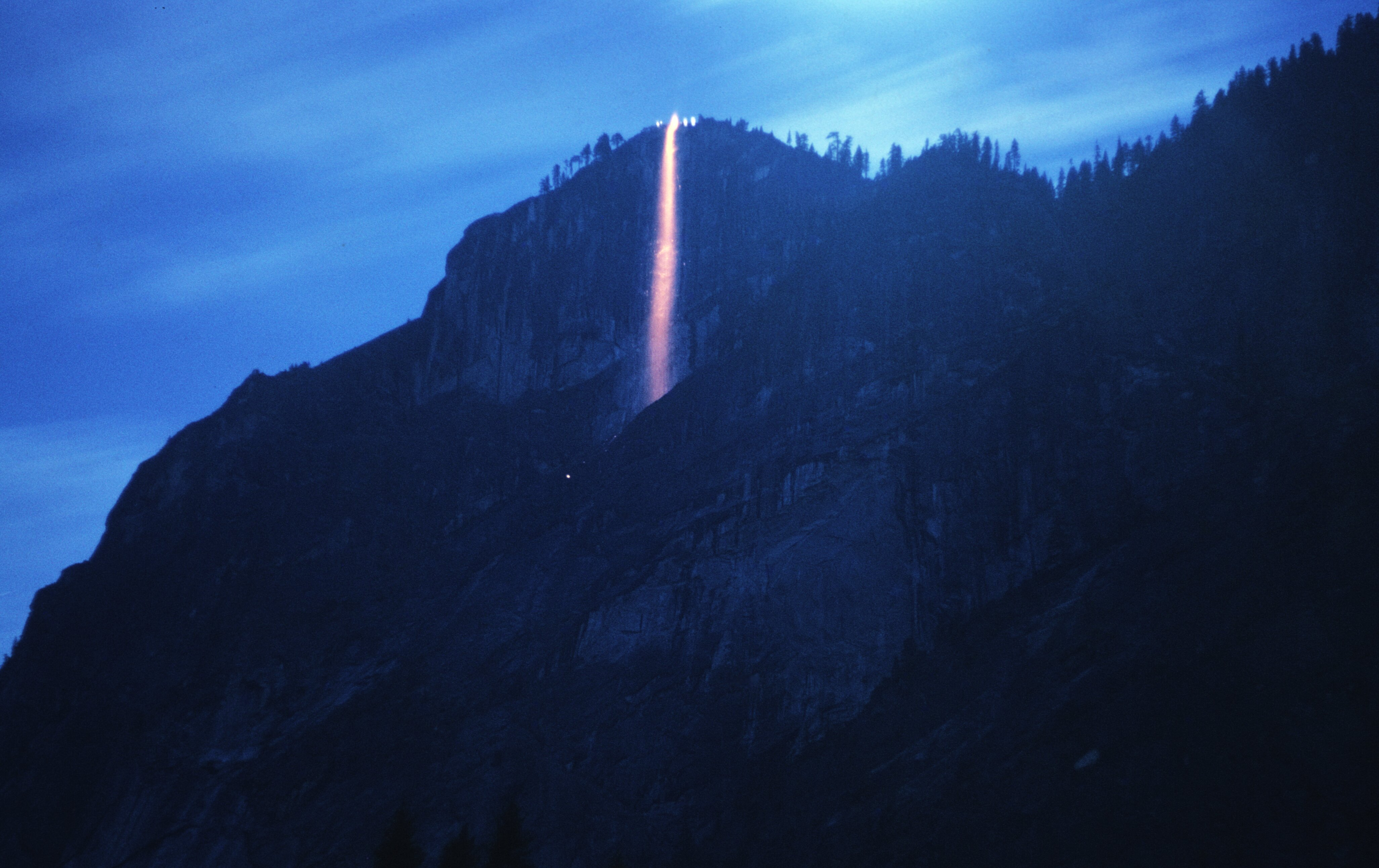
Long-exposure photograph of the Firefall taken from the Ahwahnee Meadow

The Yosemite Firefall was a summertime event in which burning embers were pushed from Glacier Point in Yosemite National Park to the valley 3,000 feet (900 m) below. This event has been replaced by viewing Horsetail Fall on El Capitan in February, when the setting sun illuminates the waterfall and casts a warm, fiery glow resembling a cascade of fire.

The owners of the Glacier Point Hotel conducted the firefall. History has it that David Curry, founder of Camp Curry, would stand at the base of the fall, and yell "Let the fire fall," each night as a signal to start pushing the embers. The firefalls were performed at 9 p.m. seven nights a week as the final act of a performance at Camp Curry.

The historic Firefall ended in January 1968, when National Park Service director George B. Hartzog ordered it to stop because the overwhelming number of visitors trampled the meadows, and because it was not a natural event. The NPS wanted to preserve the valley, returning it to its natural state. The Glacier Point Hotel was destroyed by fire 18 months later and was not rebuilt.

== Glacier Point Firefall ==
=== Nineteenth-century origin ===
In 1871, before Yosemite became a national park, an Irish immigrant named James McCauley hired John Conway to build the Four Mile Trail from Yosemite Valley, where McCauley lived, to Glacier Point. When the trail was completed, McCauley built a small hotel called the Glacier Point Mountain House. McCauley and his wife Barbara operated the hotel during the summer months. In 1883, James McCauley sent for his niece, Elizabeth McCauley, to come from Ireland and help with the hotel.

McCauley's son Fred had an apple orchard just outside the park. His twin brother John told Ranger-Naturalist Bob Fry in 1961 that the Firefalls began spontaneously one day. James McCauley often made a large campfire for his guests on the point of the granite cliff that jutted out over the valley. All would sit around the fire and talk. At the end of the evening, McCauley would kick the glowing coals over the edge of the cliff. People in the valley were fascinated by the falling embers and mentioned it to McCauley's sons. Some visitors gave them money, saying things like "Here's two bits. Tell your father to have another firefall tonight." The sons decided this was a way to earn a little money. They gathered wood for a larger fire, carrying it up the mountain on their burros. James McCauley tied a gunny sack to a long pole and dipped in "coal oil". He would light the sack and wave it as a signal that the Firefall was about to begin. Then he would kick over the campfire coals and spectators would watch from below as the coals fell. The park placed a warning sign which read:

It is 3,000 feet to the bottom
And no undertaker to meet you
TAKE NO CHANCES
There is a difference
Between bravery and just plain
ORDINARY FOOLISHNESS

In 1897, the Washburn brothers, who owned the Wawona Hotel, had the Guardian of the State Grant evict James McCauley and took over his hotel at Glacier Point. They stopped the Firefalls.

The following year, McCauley bought John Lembert's homestead in Tuolumne Meadows and ran cattle there. He and his sons built a small cabin on the property at Tuolumne Meadows; today the "McCauley Cabin" houses park personnel. The McCauley family sold it to the Sierra Club in 1912, and the Sierra Club sold it to the National Park Service in 1973.

=== Camp Curry years ===
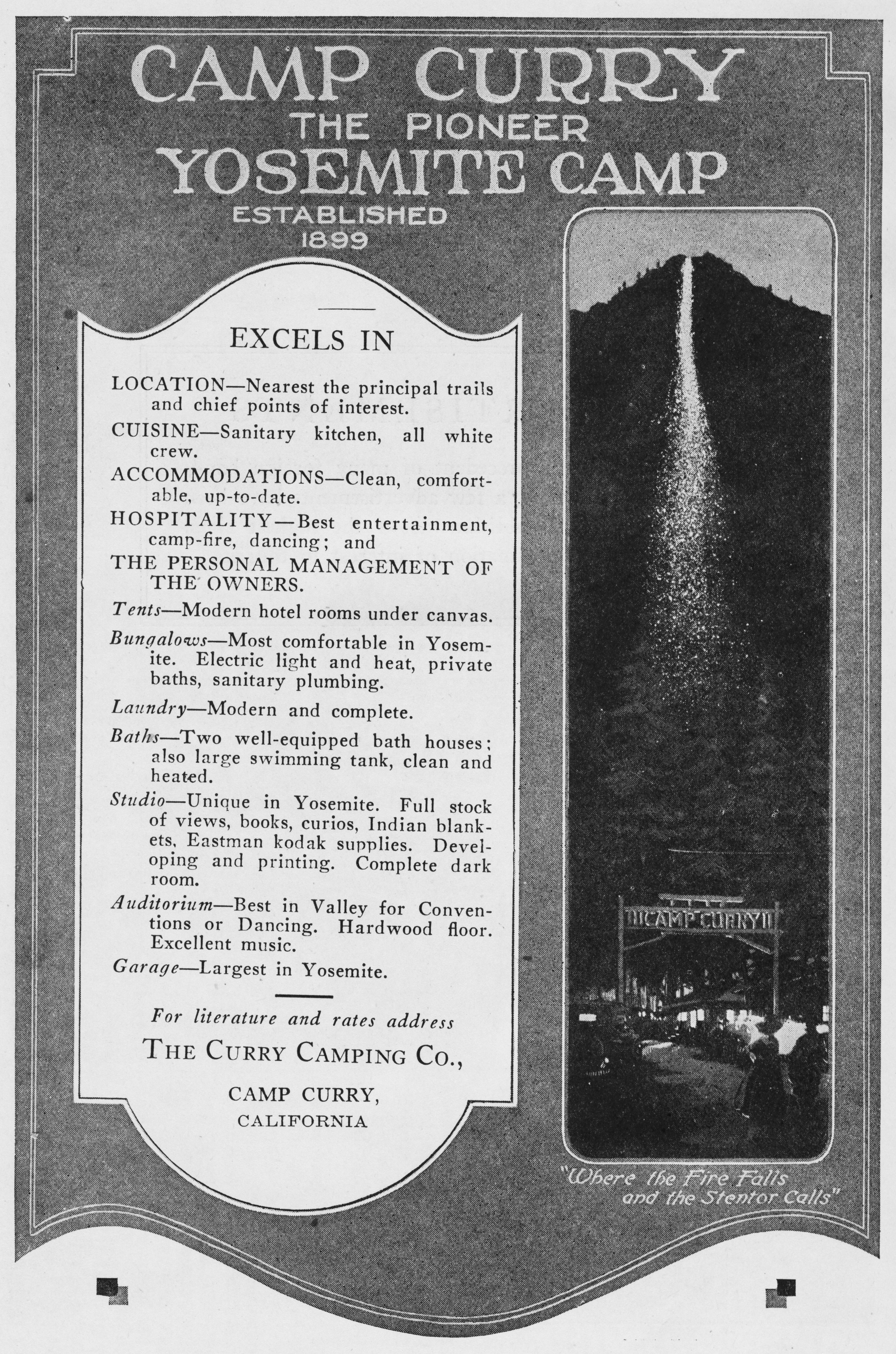
A 1921 advertisement for Camp Curry featured the Firefall and the voice of the Stentor.

In 1899 David Curry established Camp Curry in Yosemite Valley. Soon he heard visitors reminiscing about the Firefall when McCauley ran the hotel at Glacier Point. Sometime in the early 1900s, Curry reestablished the Firefall during the summer season, when guests were at Camp Curry. He sent his employees to build a fire on the point and push it off on special occasions.

Curry prided himself on his booming voice. He would call up to Glacier Point to signal when the Firefall should begin:

David Curry: Hello, Glacier Point.
Glacier Point: Hello.
David Curry: Let 'er go, Gallagher.

On May 31, 1913, Curry and Assistant Secretary of the Interior Adolph C. Miller had a confrontation over the Curry Camping Company's lease. Miller told him, "I'm going to take the Firefall away. There will be no Firefall." Curry felt that a rival company, the Desmond Park Service Company, had influenced the Park Service against him. From then on, he began the nightly entertainment program by saying "Welcome to Camp Curry, where the Stentor calls and fire used to fall." In 1916, Desmond built the Glacier Point Hotel, a large chalet-style hotel with a commanding view of Yosemite Valley, Vernal Fall, and Nevada Fall.

On March 8, 1917, Secretary of the Interior Franklin K. Lane granted the Curry Camping Company a five-year lease and said that the Firefall could be reinstated as a nightly summertime event. David Curry died on April 30, but his widow and son opened Camp Curry as usual that summer and presided at the reintroduction of the Firefall. Foster Curry shouted "Let 'er go, Gallagher" and continued as the caller for many years.

The job of making the calls later was one that loud-voiced employees competed for.

Camp Curry: Hello, Glacier Point.
Glacier Point: Hello, Camp Curry.
Camp Curry: Is the fire ready?
Glacier Point: The fire is ready.
Camp Curry: Let the fire fall.
Glacier Point: The fire falls.

By 1960, the middle exchange ("Is the fire ready?"; "The fire is ready.") was eliminated.

As the fire fell, the "Indian Love Call" was sung at Camp Curry while visitors saw what seemed to be a waterfall of fire. At the campground sites where Ranger-Naturalists (as they were called then) gave nightly summer talks, "America the Beautiful" was played, and the audience sang along. The time of the Firefall was established as 9:00 p.m. The Ranger-Naturalists had to be careful to end their programs in the campgrounds and at Camp Curry right at 9:00, or the "fire would fall on the program." In 1962, President John F. Kennedy visited Yosemite National Park, and on that night an especially large fire was built on the Point to make a spectacular Firefall. President Kennedy was on the telephone at 9:00, so the Firefall was delayed until he finished, and the Firefall occurred around 9:30 p.m.

Sometime, probably by 1920, red fir bark was found to be the best fuel to produce an even flow of coals, so fires were made of red fir bark instead of wood. Employees would gather huge piles of the bark, which they stored near the hotel; each day a stack of the bark would be placed on the Valley side of the Point, to be lit that night and to burn for a couple hours to produce a bed of coals. Through the years, visitors to Glacier Point enjoyed watching the hotel employees gradually push the glowing embers off the cliff with long-handled metal pushers.

In 1925 all the rival business companies in the Park united to form the Yosemite Park and Curry Company under the direction of the Curry family. YPCC continued to be the concessionaire of Yosemite National Park until 1993. (Although the YPCC has been owned by various corporations in recent decades, the name remained unchanged.)

During World War II the Firefall was cancelled. Some people in both the National Park Service and the Yosemite Park and Curry Company hoped that it would not be continued after the war. The NPS considered it an unnatural event in a natural area, and the task of presenting the Firefall each night was burdensome to YPCC. Employees drove trucks farther to find the red fir bark, because they were allowed to collect it only from trees that were dead and down. Before the Firefall ended, they were going as far as the Tioga Road.

After World War II, the public demanded the Firefall's return.

=== The end of a tradition ===
In January 1968, director George B. Hartzog of the Park Service ordered the Firefall be discontinued on the grounds such a man-made event was inconsistent with the Service mission to encourage appreciation of natural wonders. According to Hartzog, the firefall was as appropriate as "horns on a rabbit". Also, the traffic was increasingly problematic, as each night a stream of cars left the campgrounds and meadow areas where people had gone to get the best views.

The last Firefall was on Thursday, January 25, 1968. Since it was winter, no crowd was present.

== Horsetail Fall ==
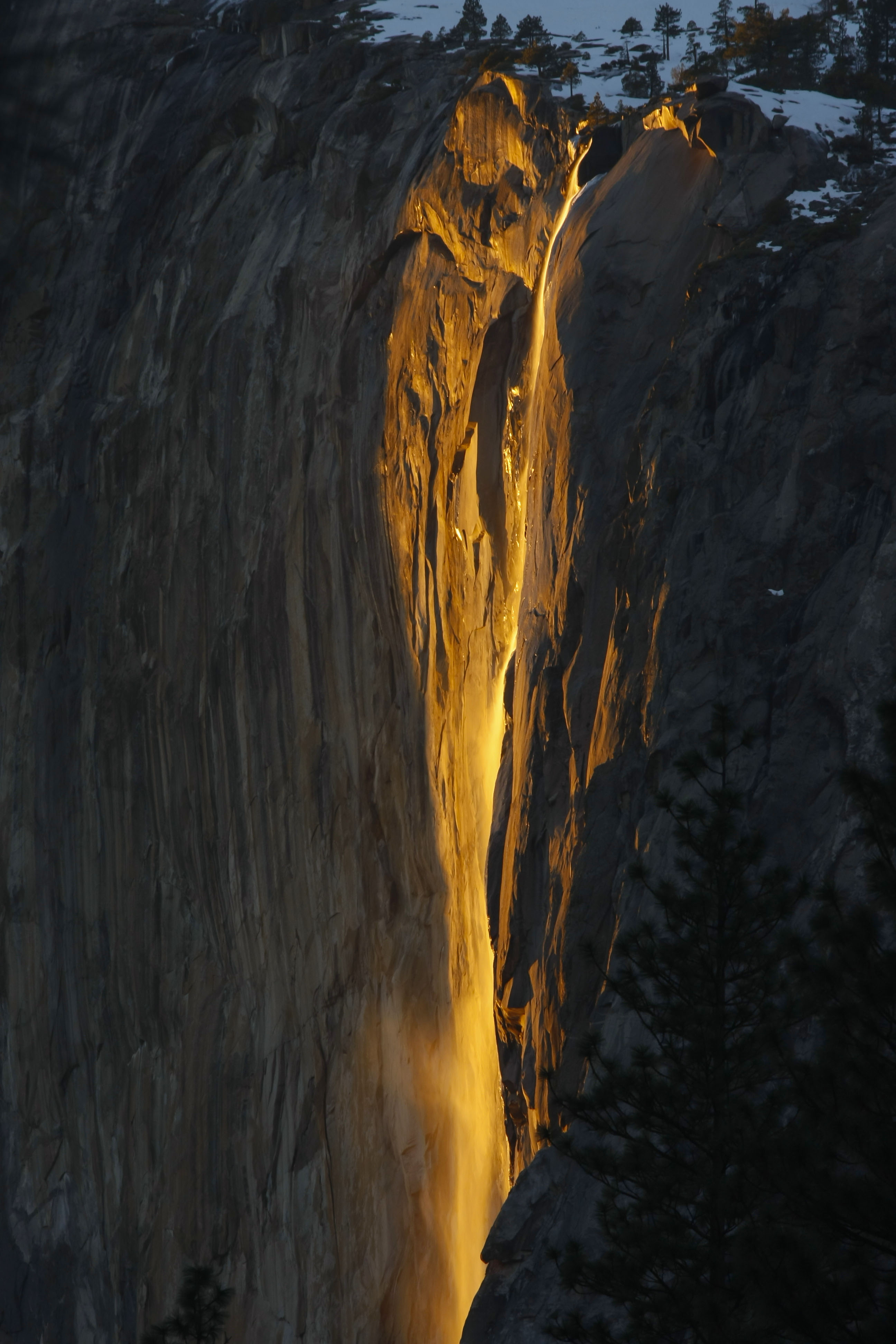
Close-up of the Yosemite Firefall at Horsetail Fall

The modern iteration of the Firefall is now observed at Horsetail Fall on El Capitan in Yosemite. During the month of February and when conditions are right, the setting sun illuminates the waterfall with an orange glow.

This predominantly occurs from mid- to late- February, with the peak intensity usually observed around February 21. The golden hues begin to appear approximately 35 minutes before sunset, with the vibrant orange and red colors becoming prominent 10–15 minutes before sunset. This event is highly dependent on the sun's specific angle of descent coupled with the availability of water in Horsetail Fall, which is subject to precipitation and snowmelt.

In February 2025, Yosemite employees hung an upside-down U.S. flag next to Horsetail Fall to protest the recent mass firing of National Park Service staff by the Trump administration.

=== Viewing Firefall ===
Viewers can marvel at this phenomenon from various vantage points within the park, including El Cap Meadow, Tunnel View, and a section of Southside Drive.

=== Reservations and access ===
In recent years, an influx of visitors has led to a reservation system during the peak viewing period in February. The park has set specific dates when Temporary Vehicle Reservations are required to access the park.

In 2022, reservations were required for the entire month and in 2023 were necessary only on weekends. The park offers ample parking lots, with signs along North River Road near Yosemite Lodge guiding visitors to the designated parking areas. From the main parking lots, a walk of approximately 1.5 miles leads to the most common viewing areas. A parking pass is available for $35 as well as a $2 reservation fee to view the Firefall.

== In popular culture ==
- The Firefall can be seen in the 1954 movie The Caine Mutiny when Willie Keith and his girlfriend, May Wynn, visit Yosemite for shore leave. The movie is based on the book of the same name, which also has the Firefall in it.
- In 1974, musician Rick Roberts named his band "Firefall" after the Yosemite spectacle.
- The dénouement of Richard P. Powell's novel Say It With Bullets takes place at the Firefall.

== Bibliography ==
- Huber, N. K. (2001, November 21). Yosemite Falls - A new perspective. Yosemite. https://pubs.usgs.gov/publication/70206784
- Sargent, Shirley. Pioneers in Petticoats: Yosemite's Early Women, 1856–1900. Los Angeles: Trans-Anglo Books, 1966.
- Sargent, Shirley. Yosemite & Its Innkeepers: The Story of a Great Park and Its Chief Concessionaires. Yosemite: Flying Spur Press, 1975.
