= The Firefall =

1904 film by Georges Méliès

- Directed by: Georges Méliès
- Starring: Georges Méliès
- Production company: Star Film Company
- Release date: 1904
- Country: France
- Language: Silent

La Cascade de feu, sold in the United States as The Firefall and in Britain as Cascade of Fire, is a 1904 French silent trick film by Georges Méliès. It was sold by Méliès's Star Film Company and is numbered 665–667 in its catalogues.

Méliès plays Satan in the film, which uses pyrotechnics, substitution splices, multiple exposures, and dissolves for its special effects. The baroque frame prop was reused from the aquarium featured in Méliès's film The Mermaid earlier that year.

A print of the film survives, and has been known to film scholarship since at least 1979, when John Frazer described it in his book Artificially Arranged Scenes: The Films of Georges Méliès. However, Frazer misidentified this film as a different Méliès film, Beelzebub's Daughters. (In turn, the film Frazer describes as The Firefall is in fact a film by Ferdinand Zecca.) Reviewing the film, which he found slow-moving compared to other Méliès works of the same period, Frazer speculated that it may have been a "casual production generated out of a number of stock props," loosely inspired by H. Rider Haggard's novel She.
