= Elbow Room (short story collection) =

1977 book by James Alan McPherson

- First edition cover
- Author: James Alan McPherson
- Language: English
- Publisher: Little, Brown
- Publication date: 1977
- Publication place: United States
- Media type: Print (hardback & paperback)

Elbow Room: Stories is a 1977 short story collection by American author James Alan McPherson. It won the Pulitzer Prize for Fiction in 1978.

== Contents ==
The twelve short stories of Elbow Room appear in the following sequence:

- "Why I like Country Music"
- "The Story of a Dead Man"
- "The Silver Bullet"
- "The Faithful"
- "Problems of Art"
- "The Story of a Scar"
- "I am an American"
- "Widows and Orphans"
- "A Loaf of Bread"
- "Just Enough for the City"
- "A Sense of Story"
- "Elbow Room"
