= Panorama Trail =

Hiking trail in Yosemite National Park, California, US

Coordinates: 37°43′36.8″N 119°34′24.2″W

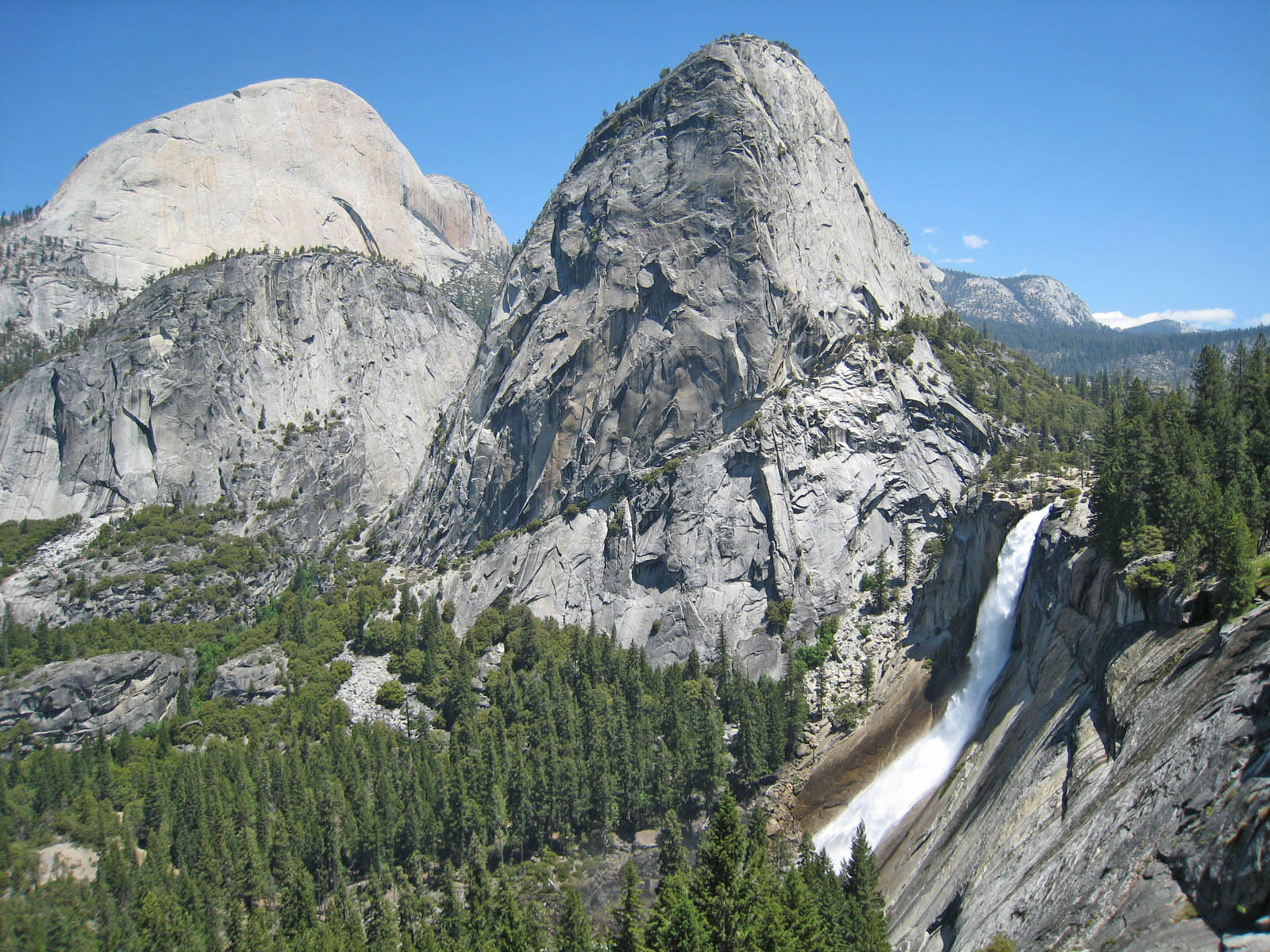
- Nevada Falls with Liberty Cap and the back of Half Dome from Panorama Trail
- Length: 8.5 miles (13.7 km) one-way
- Location: California, United States
- Trailheads: Happy Isles trailhead, Yosemite Valley; Glacier Point
- Use: backpacking, hiking, trail running, trail riding
- Elevation change: 3,200 feet (980 m)
- Highest point: Glacier Point trailhead, 7,200 feet (2,200 m)
- Lowest point: Happy Isles trailhead, 4,000 feet (1,200 m)
- Difficulty: Moderate to strenuous
- Months: Year-round
- Sights: Glacier Point, Panorama Point, Illilouette Falls, Nevada Fall, Emerald Pool, Vernal Fall
- Hazards: Snowmelt, icy slopes early season, altitude

The Panorama Trail is a marked hiking trail in Yosemite National Park that descends along the south wall of Yosemite Valley from Glacier Point, past several major waterfalls, to Happy Isles. The trail derives its name from the panoramic vistas visible along the route, most notably Panorama Point.

== Description ==
=== Route ===
The Panorama Trail trailhead at Glacier Point is located near the Glacier Point Amphitheater at a clearly-marked junction. The trail follows the south wall of Yosemite Valley east to Illilouette Falls. The trail then crosses Illilouette Creek and ascends briefly before continuing down toward Nevada Fall. From Nevada Fall, the trail is concurrent with the Mist Trail as it continues west along the Merced River, past Vernal Fall, to its northern trailhead at Happy Isles in Yosemite Valley.

=== Restrooms ===
Restrooms are available at the Glacier Point trailhead, along the trail above Nevada Fall and Vernal Fall, and at the Vernal Fall footbridge just east of Emerald Pool.

=== Shuttle bus ===
A shuttle bus from Yosemite Valley to Glacier Point is available for a fee from June to October, when Glacier Point Road is open. The bus leaves the Yosemite Lodge at 8:30 a.m. and 1:30 p.m. and takes a little over an hour to get to Glacier Point. There is no regular shuttle bus service from Glacier Point down to Yosemite Valley.

== Related hikes ==
- The High Sierra Camps provide a loop through the Yosemite backcountry, with tent cabins spaced one day's hike apart. These require reservations.
- A trailhead of the Four Mile Trail is also located at Glacier Point.
