= Illilouette Fall =

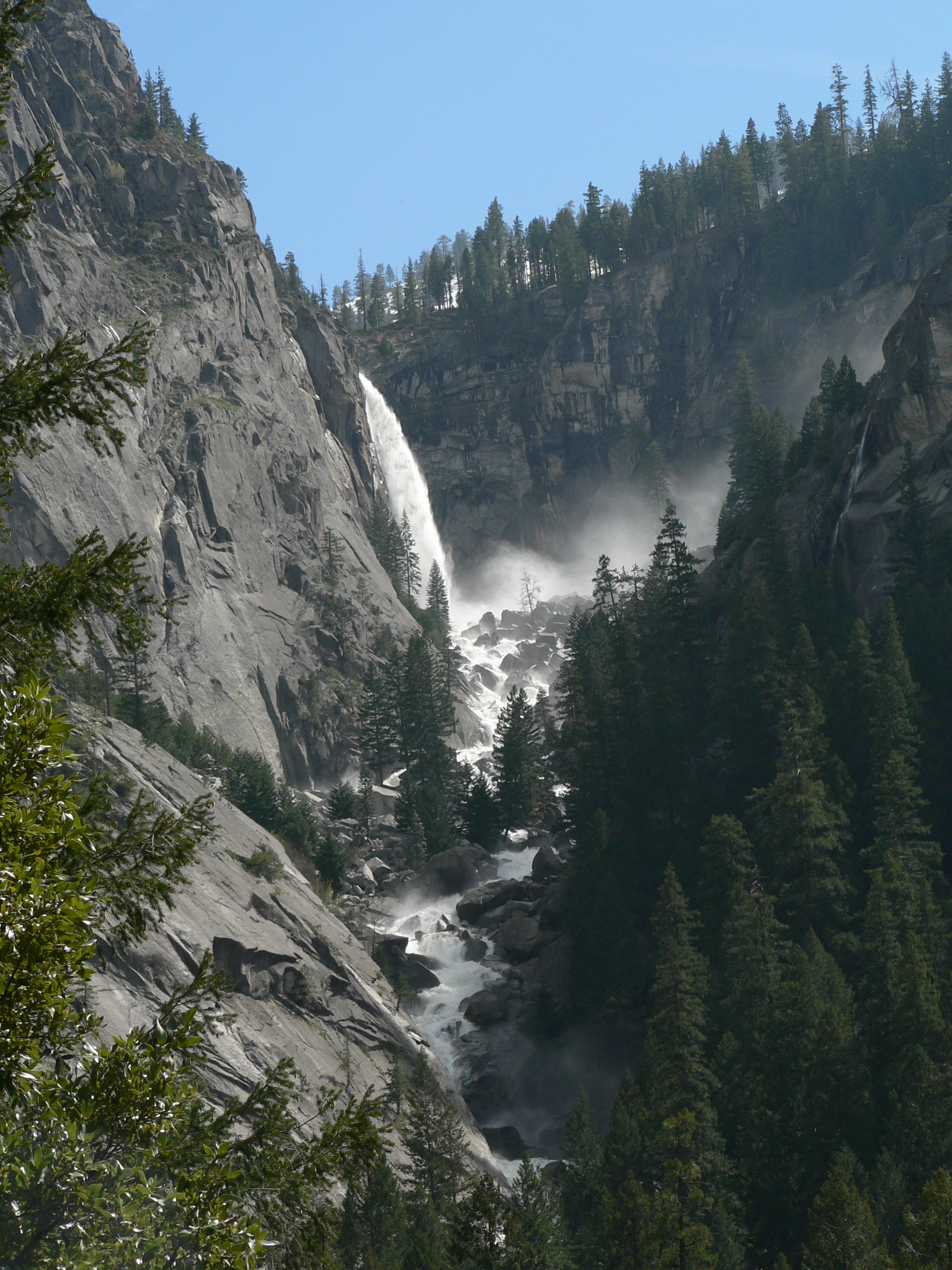
- Illilouette Fall from Mist Trail
- Interactive map of Illilouette Fall
- Location: Yosemite Valley, Yosemite National Park, California, US
- Coordinates: 37.71413°N 119.56119°W
- Type: Veiling plunge
- Total height: 381 feet (116 m)
- Number of drops: 1
- Longest drop: 381 feet (116 m)
- Total width: 120 feet (37 m)
- Average width: 85 feet (26 m)
- Watercourse: Illilouette Creek
- World height ranking: 733

Illilouette Fall is a 381-foot (116 m) waterfall on the Illilouette Creek tributary of the Merced River in Yosemite National Park. It is located in a small canyon that cuts into the south wall of Yosemite Valley directly across from Vernal Fall. The origin and meaning of the waterfall's name has been lost to time.

The fall is prominently visible to the south from both Mist Trail and John Muir Trail near Vernal Fall. However, during low-flow months, the fall can disappear entirely from this perspective. The best vantage point for viewing the waterfall is from the Panorama Trail as it descends from Glacier Point. There is no trail to the base of the fall, as the narrow canyon is craggy and inundated with rapids during the wet season. It is possible - though not encouraged - to reach the base of the fall during low-flow months.

== Name ==
The meaning of the name "Illilouette" is not known. According to Lafayette Bunnell, the Ahwahneechee name of the waterfall was "Too-lool-lo-we-ak". It was suggested by Bunnell that its literal translation was not appropriate for everyday use; what that translation was has been lost to time. "Illilouette" may have been a perversion of the waterfall's Ahwahneechee name, though this is not known with any certainty.

== See also ==
- Nevada Fall
- Bridalveil Fall
- List of waterfalls
- List of waterfalls in California
