= Mist Trail =

Hiking trail in Yosemite National Park, California

Coordinates: 37°43′37″N 119°32′40″W

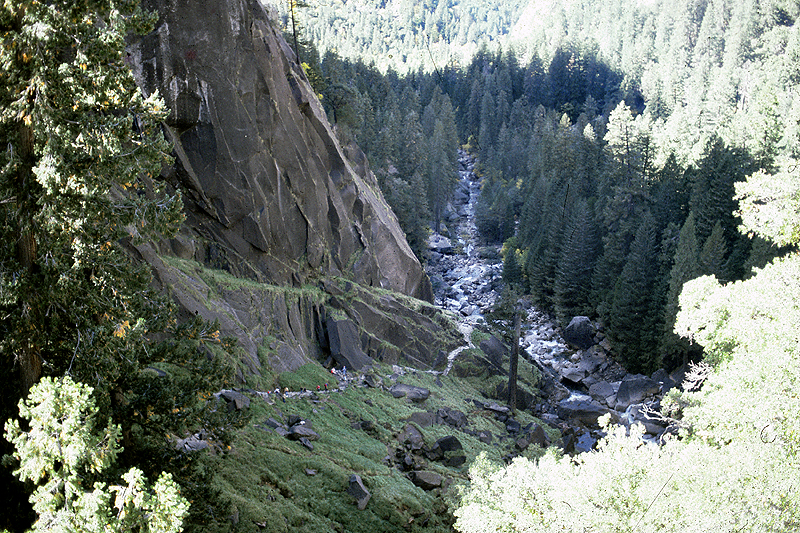
- The Mist Trail, looking west from the top of Vernal Fall (Photo taken in 1983)
- Length: 7 miles (11 km) out and back
- Location: California, United States
- Trailheads: Happy Isles trailhead, Yosemite Valley
- Use: backpacking, hiking, trail running
- Elevation change: 2,900 ft (880 m) gain
- Highest point: Nevada Fall
- Lowest point: Happy Isles trailhead, 4,000 feet (1,200 m)
- Difficulty: Moderate to strenuous
- Months: Spring to Fall
- Sights: Vernal Fall, Emerald Pool, Nevada Fall
- Hazards: Snowmelt, icy slopes early season, altitude

The Mist Trail is one of the most popular short hikes in Yosemite National Park, California, USA. The steep hike follows the Merced River, starting at Happy Isles in Yosemite Valley, past Vernal Fall and Emerald Pool, to Nevada Fall.

== Description ==
Along the trail, the Merced River is a tumultuous mountain stream, lying in a U-shaped valley. Enormous boulders, some the size of a house, are dwarfed by the sheer faces of exfoliating granite, which rise 3000 feet (914 m) from the river. Through it all, the Merced River rushes down from its source in the High Sierra, and broadens on the floor of Yosemite Valley.

A trail which links to the John Muir Trail starts after crossing from the Happy Isles. Depending on one's conditioning, a bridge which re-crosses the river - the halfway point of a hike to the foot of Vernal Fall - can be reached in 15 to 30 minutes.

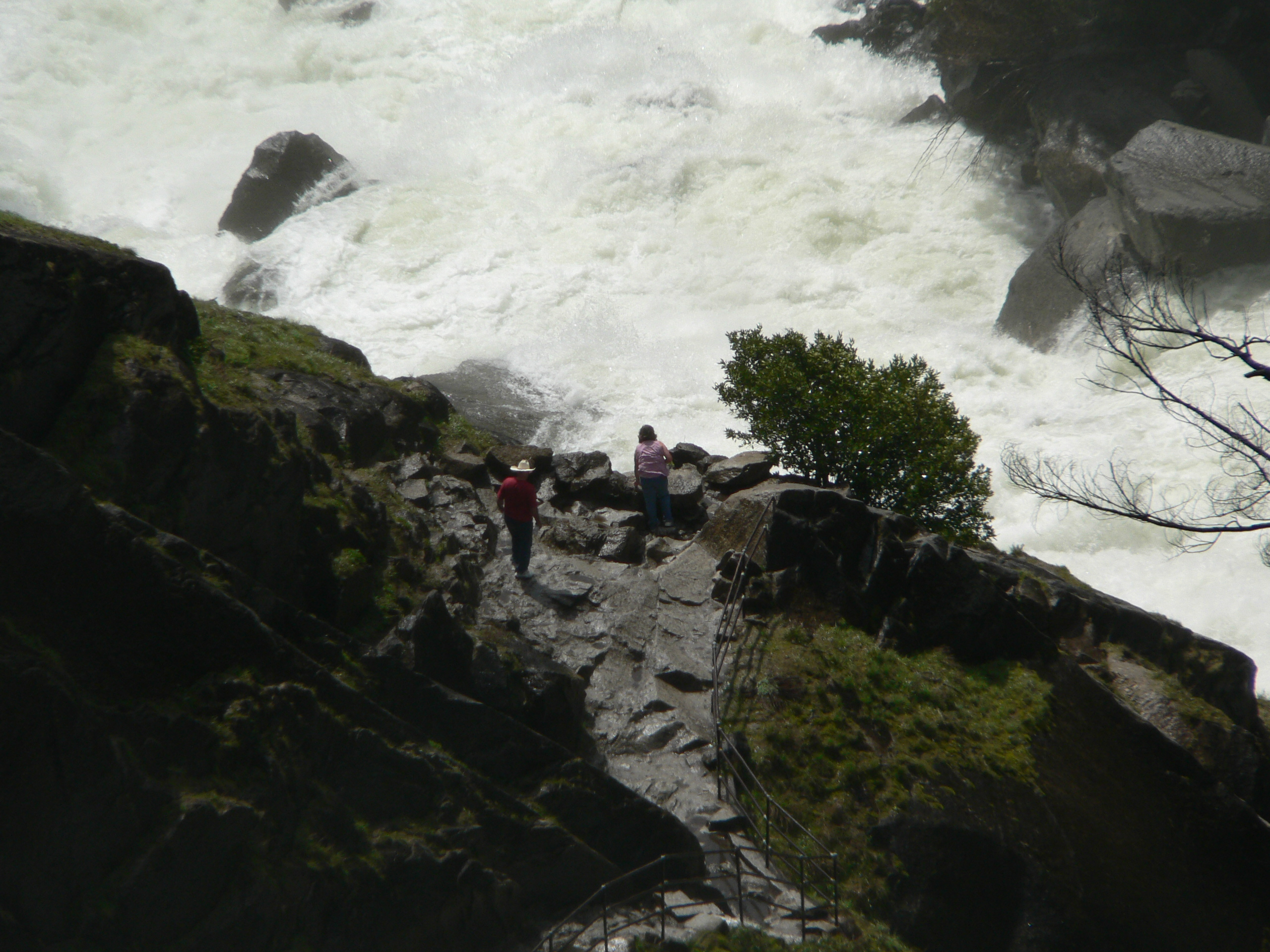
Hikers stop briefly just below the lower margin of the mist from Vernal Fall

To the side of Vernal Fall, the mist from the river blankets the trail, which was improved during the WPA projects of the 1930s. Here is where raingear becomes handy: in the spring, hikers often become completely drenched from water sprayed off Vernal Fall. This is one of the few places where a complete circular rainbow can be viewed.

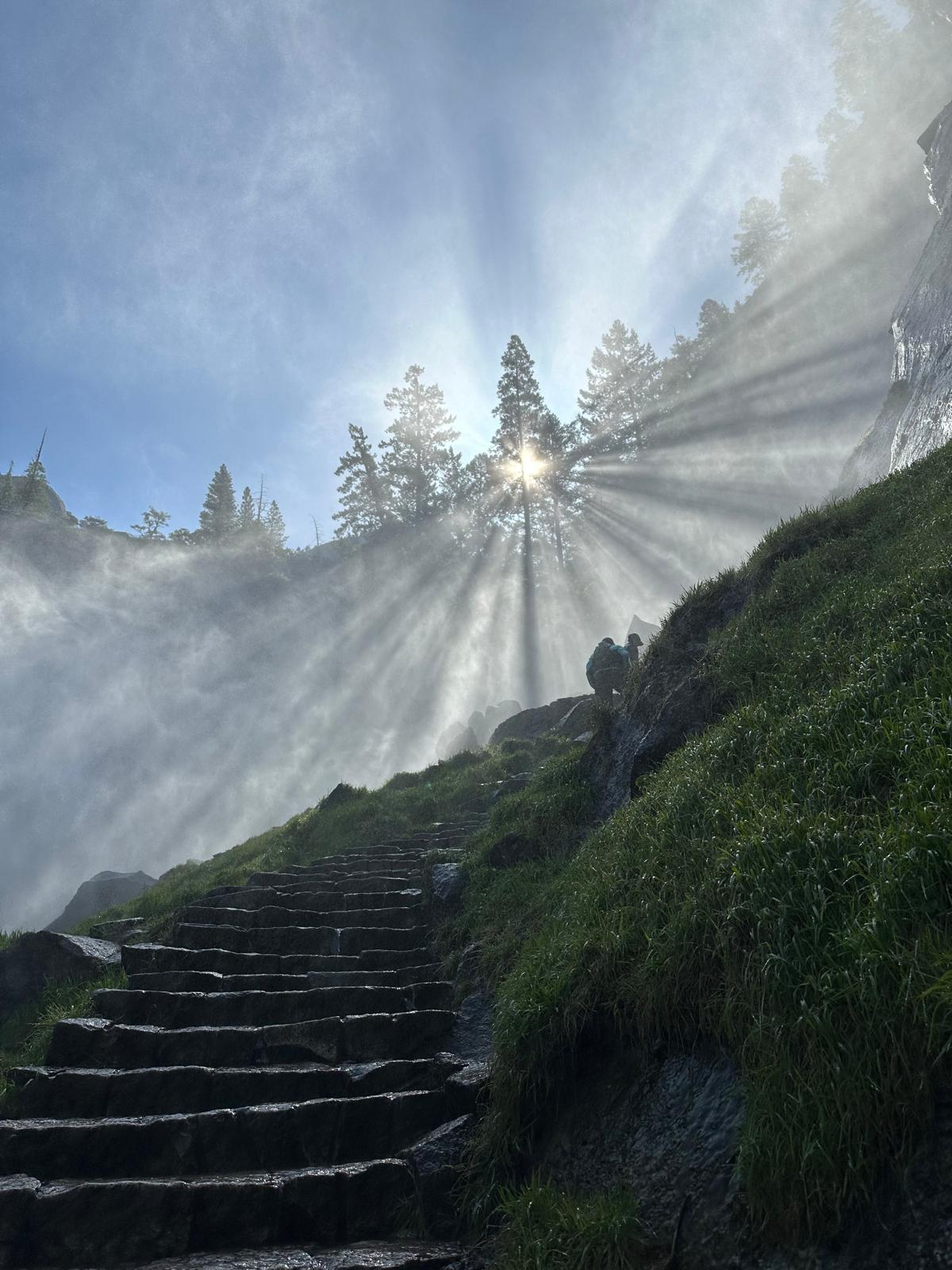
A photo showing mist on the Mist trail

The trail now crosses a sheer face which is made somewhat easier by a single guard rail. At the top of Vernal Fall, the Merced River traverses a shelf of granite, and the hikers frequently sun themselves to dry off. The Emerald Pool is named for the color of the river here.

Up the trail, Nevada Fall, a waterfall that is almost twice the height of Vernal Fall, awaits the hiker, although there is no cascade of mist over the trail at that waterfall. Behind Nevada Fall is Liberty Cap, an impressive lump of granite. The Mist Trail then rejoins the John Muir Trail: the hiker can travel in Little Yosemite Valley, or take a side trip to the top of Half Dome, using cables to climb the rock. Permits must be obtained in advance to hike Half Dome, and back country permits are required to stay overnight along the John Muir Trail.

The distance from Happy Isles trailhead to the Vernal Fall foot bridge is 0.8 miles (1.3 km) with an elevation gain of 400 ft (120m); to the top of Vernal Fall is 1.2 miles (1.95 km) with an elevation gain of 1000 ft (300m); and to the top of Nevada Fall is 2.7 miles (4.35 km) one way with an elevation gain of 1900 ft (610m)(data per NPS information).

== Related hikes ==
- The Mist Trail is commonly used as the first leg of the hike up Half Dome. Half Dome can also be reached by the John Muir Trail, but this route is longer and less scenic. However, it is less steep than the Mist Trail, which makes it more commonly used for descent. The mist from Vernal Falls can be a significant factor governing the choice between the Mist Trail and John Muir Trail while climbing Half Dome. For instance, the Mist Trail might be very inviting on warm days or something to be avoided on cool days. Also, the Mist Trail is usually more inviting on ascent, as the mist helps to cool hikers while climbing the steep trail.
- The High Sierra Camps provide a loop through the Yosemite backcountry, with tent cabins spaced one day's hike apart. These require reservations.
- A panoramic view of the Mist Trail can be had from Glacier Point, 3000 feet (900 m) above, looking north. During the summer, shuttle buses from the floor of the valley will take an hour to arrive at Glacier Point. Hikers have the option of taking a shuttle bus one-way from the valley floor to Glacier Point, then hiking on the Panorama Trail from Glacier Point down to the top of the Mist Trail at Nevada Fall.
- The John Muir Trail starts at the same trailhead as the Mist Trail.
