= Liberty Cap (California) =

Granite dome in Yosemite National Park, USA

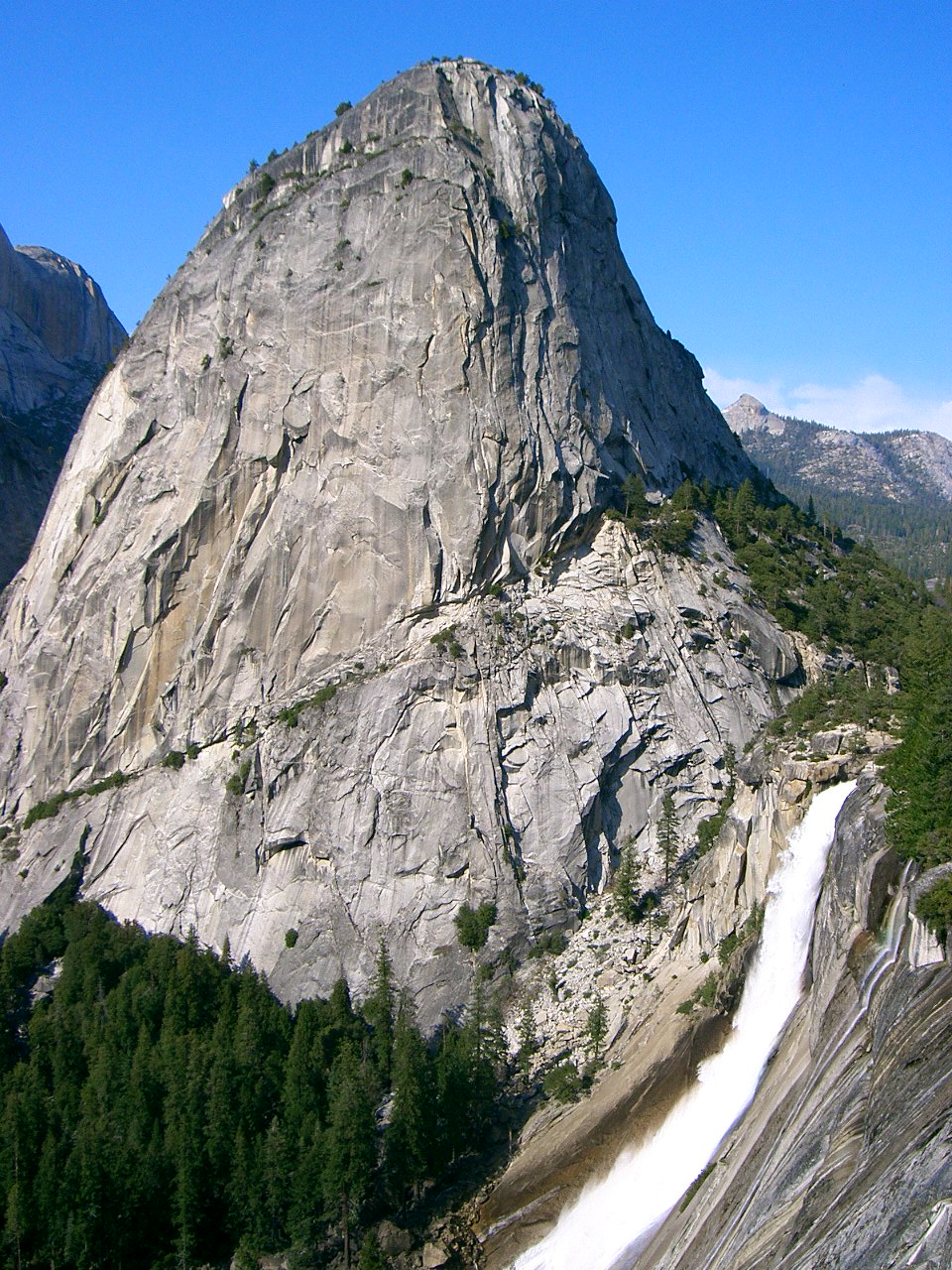
- Liberty Cap is next to Nevada Fall

Highest point
- Elevation: 7,080 ft (2,160 m) NAVD 88
- Prominence: 956 ft (291 m)
- Parent peak: Half Dome
- Coordinates: 37°43′43″N 119°31′57″W

Geography
- Location within California Location within the United States
- Location: Yosemite National Park, Mariposa County, California, U.S.
- Parent range: Sierra Nevada
- Topo map: USGS Half Dome

Geology
- Rock age: Cretaceous
- Mountain type: Granite dome

Climbing
- Easiest route: Scramble, class 2–3

Liberty Cap is a granite dome in Yosemite National Park, California, United States which lies at the extreme northwestern margin of Little Yosemite Valley. It lies adjacent, to the north of Nevada Fall, on the John Muir Trail. It rises 1,700 feet (520 m) feet from the base of Nevada Fall to a peak elevation of 7,080 ft (2,158 m). A smaller, mesa-like dome called Mount Broderick stands immediately adjacent to Liberty Cap.

== Origin of the name ==
California Governor Leland Stanford visited Yosemite in 1865, and he and James Hutchings visited Nevada Fall. Stanford didn't like any proposed names, and, looking at half-dollar reputably produced by Hutchings, saw a resemblance between the Liberty Cap and the coin's cap of liberty and decided the name better,.

== Climbing ==
The easiest routes starts at Happy Isles in Yosemite Valley and follow either the John Muir Trail or the Mist Trail to the top of Nevada Falls. Cross the bridge over the Merced River and climb the short ridge. From the granite slabs on the ridge ascend the Northeast Gully (class 2–3) to the summit.

There are a number of technical routes on Liberty Cap ranging in difficulty from class 5.8 to 5.11.

Climbing Liberty Cap requires a wilderness permit, obtainable at all Yosemite visitor centers.
