= Bunnell Point =

Mountain in the American state of California

- Location within California Location within the United States

Highest point
- Elevation: 8,186 ft (2,495 m)
- Prominence: 233 ft (71 m)
- Coordinates: 37°44′20.63″N 119°28′1.83″W

Geography
- Location: Mariposa County, California, United States
- Parent range: Clark Range
- Topo map: USGS Merced Peak

Bunnell Point is a summit in Mariposa County, California, in the United States. With an elevation of 8,172 feet (2,491 m), Bunnell Point is the 978th highest summit in the state of California.

Bunnell Point was named for the explorer Lafayette Bunnell.
