= Happy Isles =

Small group of isles in the Merced River, Yosemite National Park

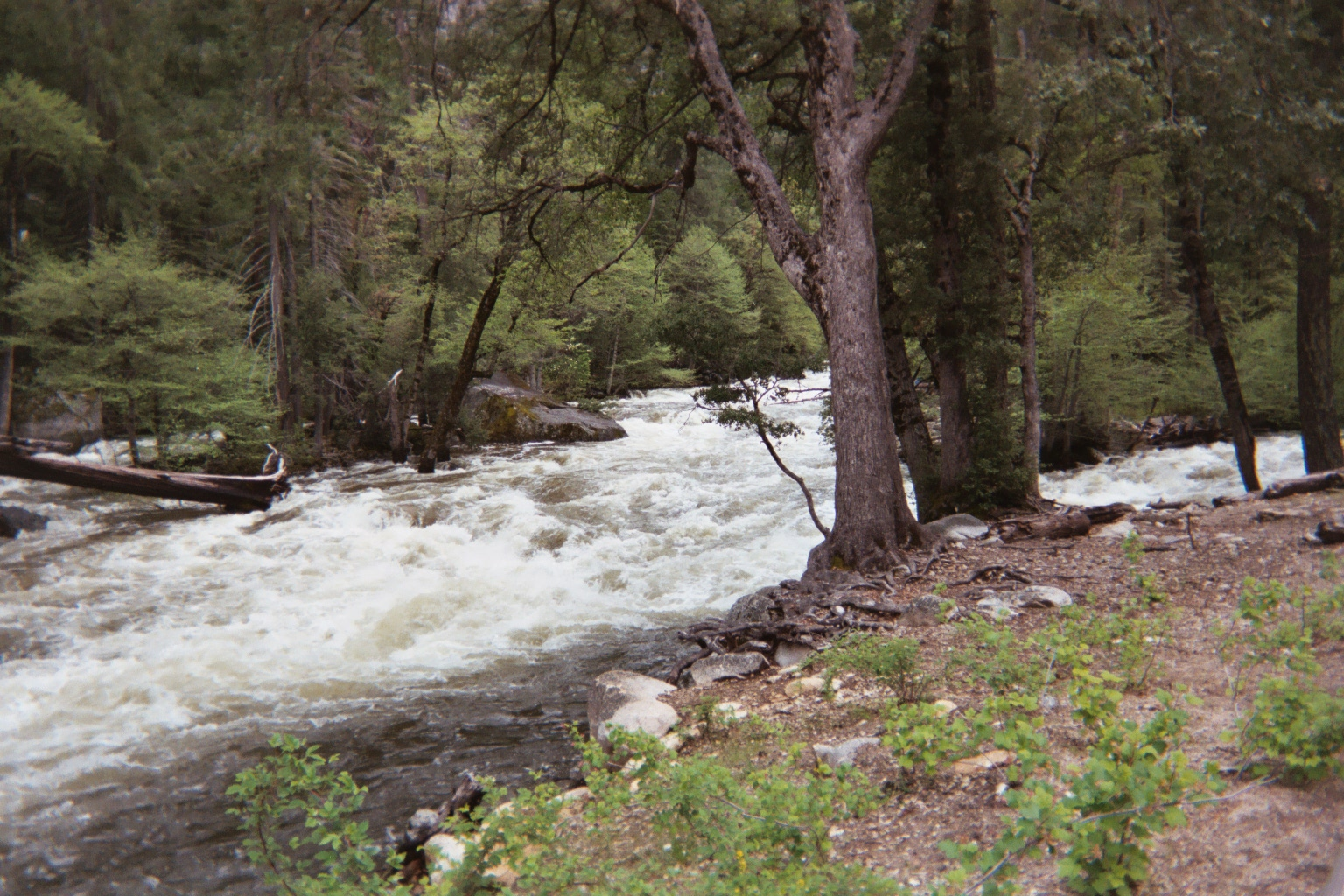
- The Merced River in Happy Isles

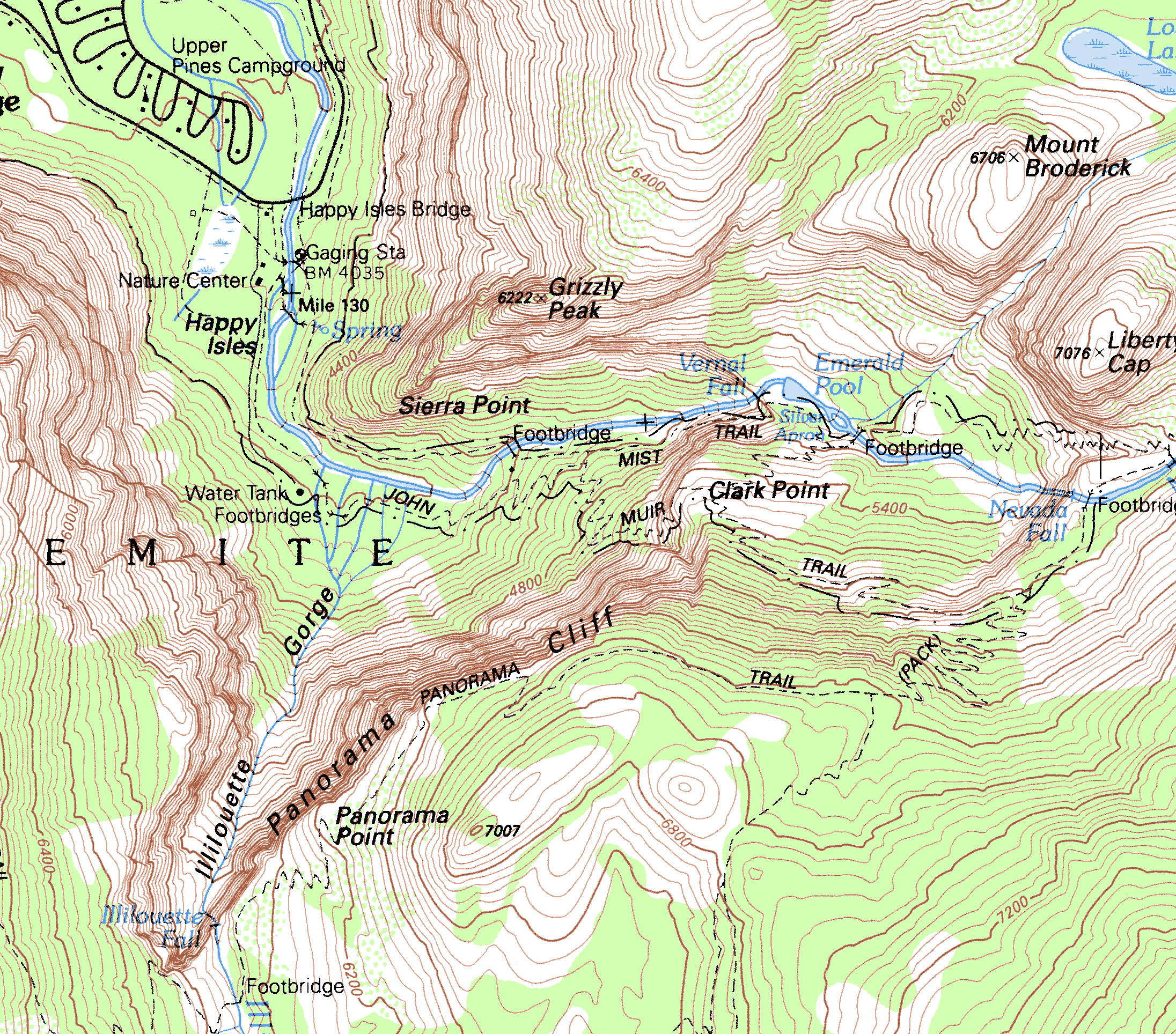
- Topographic map of Happy Isles area

Geography
- Coordinates: 37.73171°N 119.558694°W

Happy Isles is a group of small isles in the Merced River in Yosemite National Park, California, United States. They are located at the easternmost end of the Yosemite Valley floor. This scenic spot is the starting point for the Mist Trail, and is also the northern trailhead for the John Muir Trail. Happy Isles is also the trailhead for popular hiking destinations along the Mist Trail (including Vernal Falls and Nevada Falls) and Half Dome.

Happy Isles is located where the slope of the Merced River changes from the much steeper upper main stem to the essentially flat valley floor. At Happy Isles, the river gradient is approximately 2%. The gradient of the Merced River at Happy Isles is steeper than in the valley floor, and the channel of the river is cut into erosion-resistant granitic boulders and talus materials, compared to channel deposits of sands and gravel present on the valley floor. The steeper gradient and composition of streambed materials together impede meandering patterns from developing in this area.

The area near Happy Isles sustained damage in 1996 during a rockslide. A number of signposts near the Isles are dedicated to the rockfall.
