= Vernal Fall =

Waterfall on the Merced River in Yosemite National Park

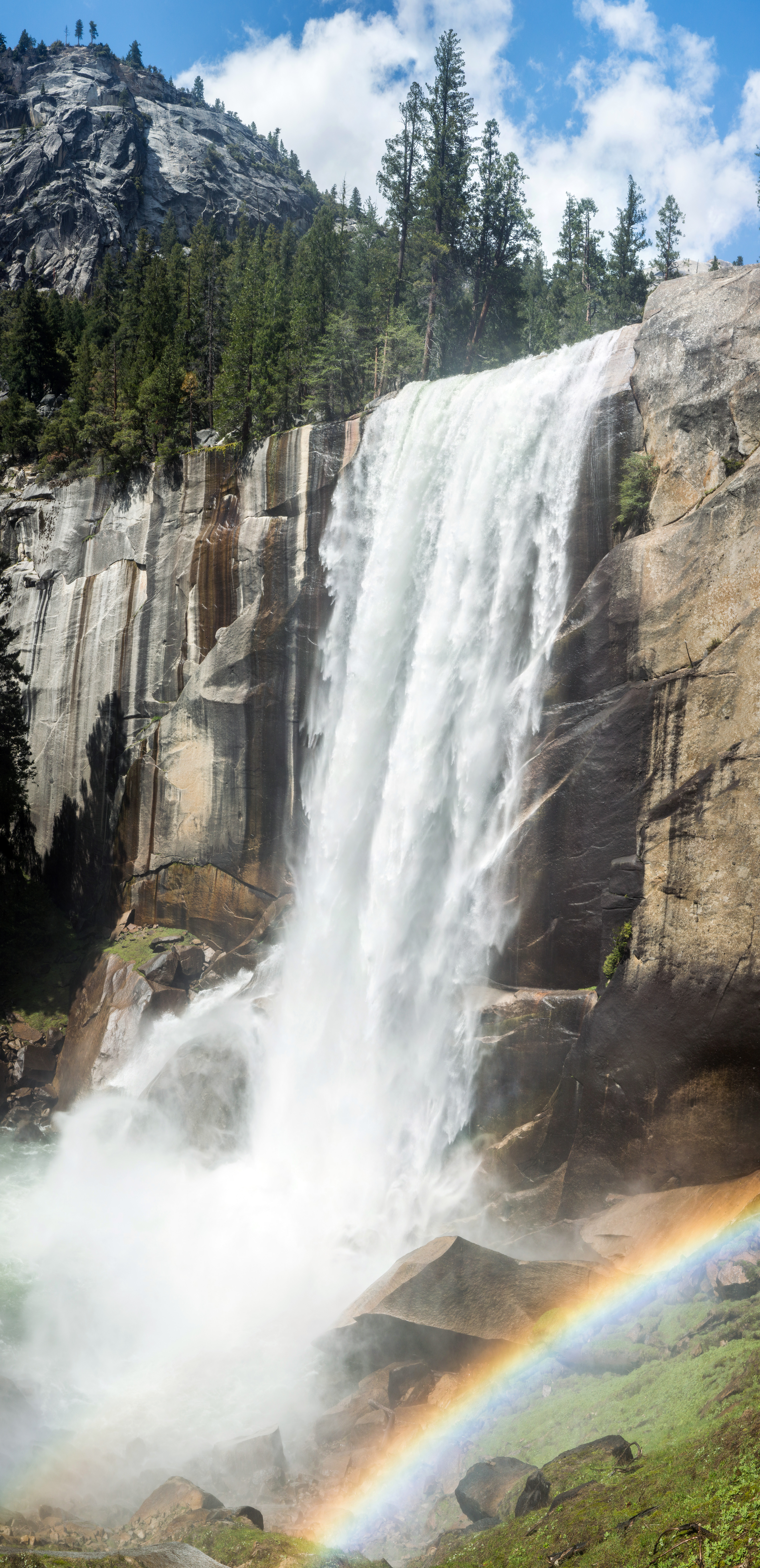
- Vernal Fall from Mist Trail
- Interactive map of Vernal Fall
- Location: Yosemite Valley, Yosemite National Park, California
- Coordinates: 37°43′39″N 119°32′38″W
- Type: Plunge
- Total height: 317 feet (97 m)
- Number of drops: 1
- World height ranking: 860

Vernal Fall is a 317-foot (96.6 m) waterfall on the Merced River just downstream of Nevada Fall in Yosemite National Park, California. Like its upstream neighbor, Vernal Fall is clearly visible at a distance, from Glacier Point, as well as close up, along the Mist Trail. The waterfall flows all year long, although by the end of summer it is substantially reduced in volume and can split into multiple strands, rather than a single curtain of water.

== History ==
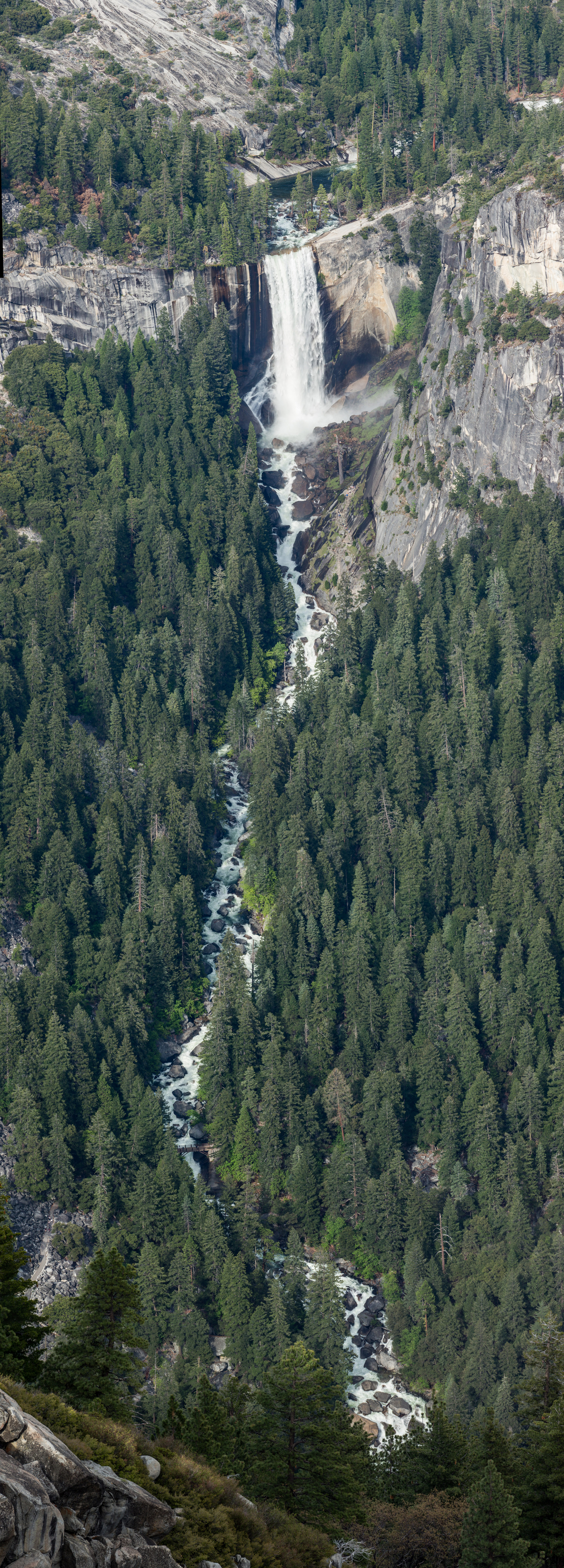
Vernal Fall and the Merced River flowing toward the Yosemite Valley

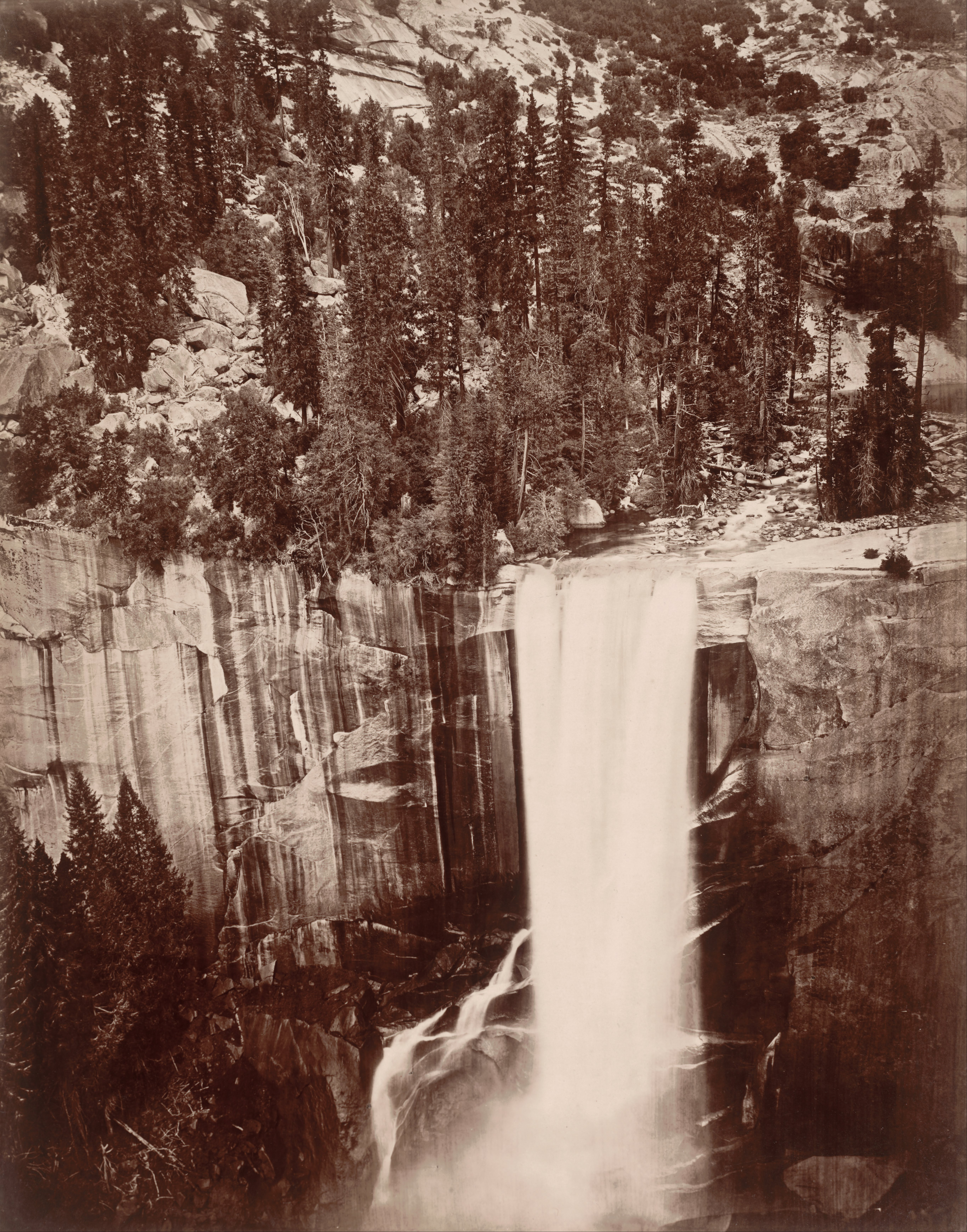
The waterfall, photographed in 1872 by Eadweard Muybridge.

=== Etymology ===
Yan-o-pah (little cloud) was the local name of the fall before it was named "Vernal"- meaning relating to Spring - by Lafayette Bunnell, a member of the Mariposa Battalion in 1851.

== Mist Trail ==
The trail begins at the Happy Isles trail head in Yosemite Valley and travels generally east-southeast. This is one of the shortest (1.3 mi or 2.1 km) and most popular trails in Yosemite. The trail is mostly shaded and is progressive in incline until it reaches the base of the waterfall where mist sprays onto the hikers.

At times of high flow, mostly in the spring, hikers may be drenched by the time they pass the mist from the waterfall. The final 15 minutes of the trail is a very steep climb up rocks to the top of the waterfall. Once atop the fall there is a pool of water called the Emerald Pool around which hikers lounge and rest. There is also a 20 degree slope of rock with water flowing into the pool called the Silver Apron.

== Hazards ==
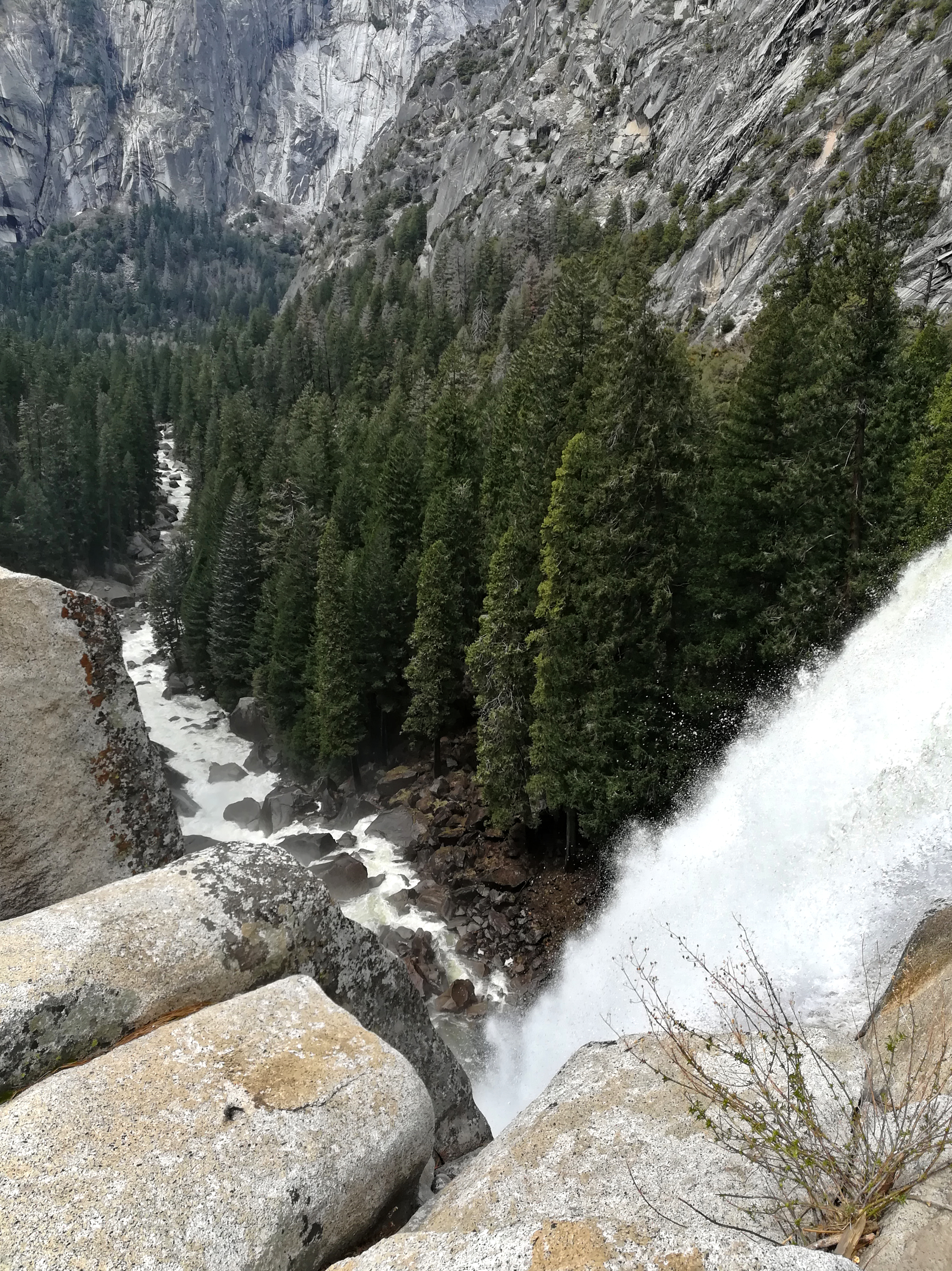
View from the top

Swimming above Vernal Fall carries a great deal of risk: the rocks are slippery, the river has strong undercurrents that may not be visible from the surface, and tourists have been swept over the fall to their deaths. Though swimming there is illegal and warnings to stay out of the water are clearly posted, several deaths have occurred when visitors entered the water above the fall in the vicinity of the Silver Apron and Emerald Pool. Three people died in a single day, on July 19, 2011, after being swept over Vernal Fall in this manner.

== Postage stamp ==
The fall is shown in error on a 1932 Philippines stamp. Although the stamp indicates that it depicts Pagsanjan Falls in the Philippines, it in fact shows Vernal Fall.

== See also ==
- List of waterfalls
- List of waterfalls in California
