= Bridalveil Fall =

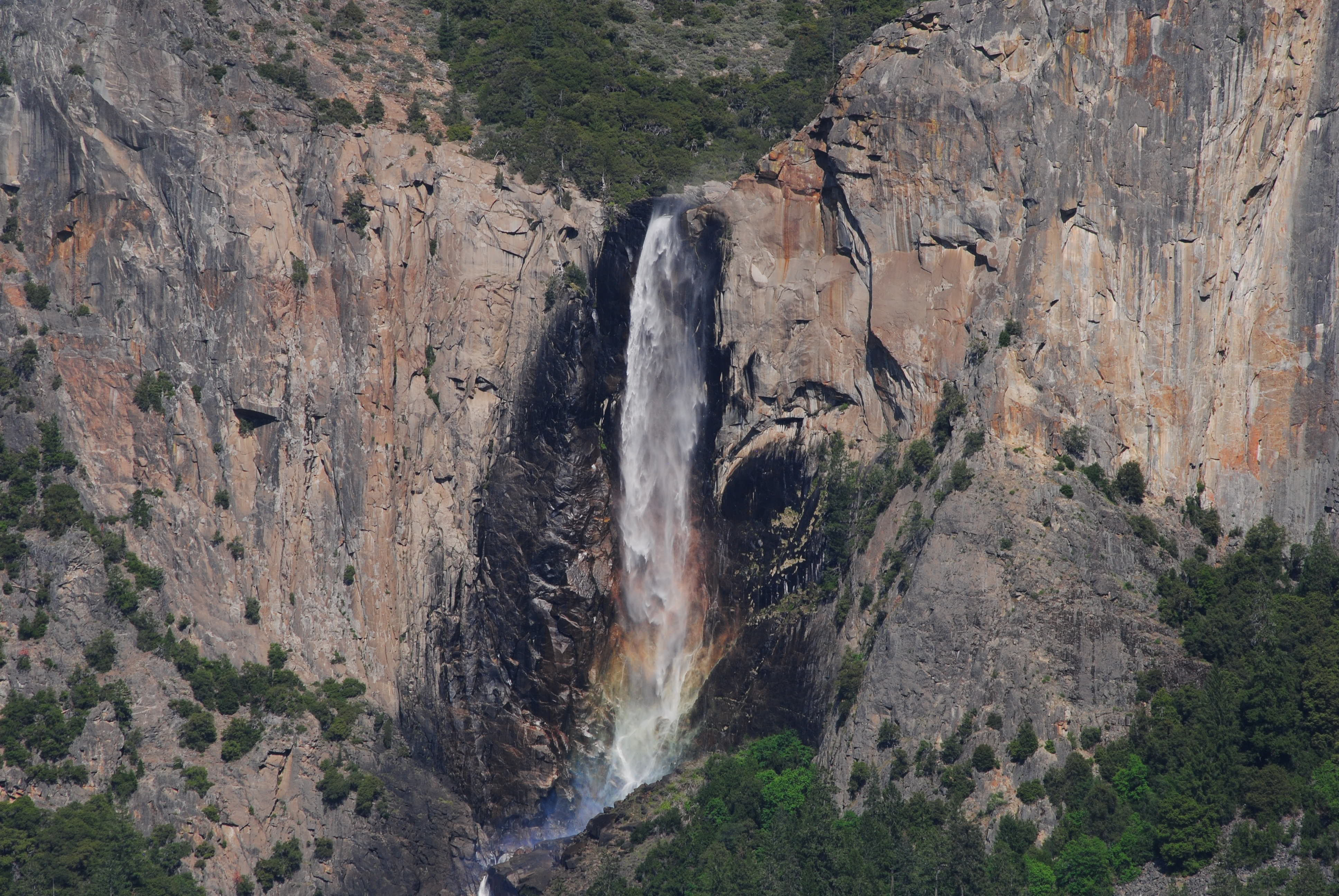
- Bridalveil Fall as seen from Tunnel View on California State Route 41.
- Interactive map of Bridalveil Fall
- Location: Yosemite Valley, Yosemite National Park, California
- Coordinates: 37°43′00″N 119°38′47″W
- Type: Plunge
- Total height: 188 metres (617 ft)
- Number of drops: 1
- World height ranking: 431

Bridalveil Fall is one of the most prominent waterfalls in the Yosemite Valley in California. The waterfall is 188 metres (617 ft) in height and flows year round.

== Geology ==
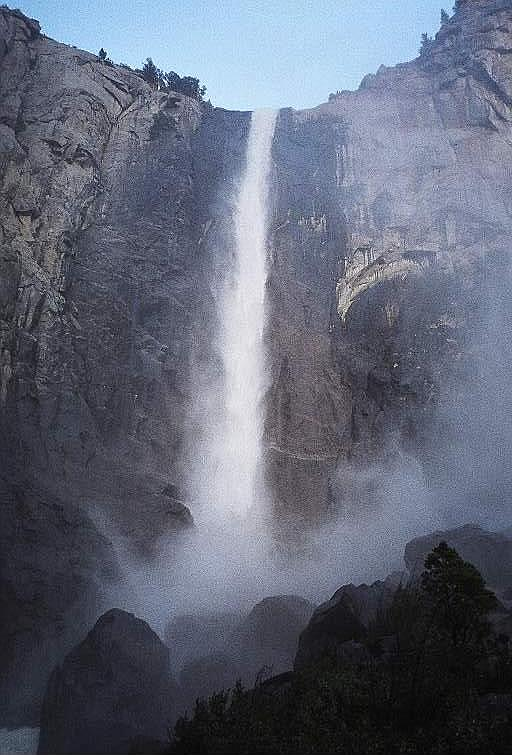
Base of Bridalveil Fall.

The glaciers that carved Yosemite Valley left many hanging valleys that spawned the waterfalls that pour into the valley. Most of the waterways that fed these falls carved the hanging valleys into steep cascades, but Bridalveil Creek still leaps into the valley from the edge of the precipice, although that edge has moved back into an alcove from the original edge of the valley. While Yosemite Falls seem to also fall into this category, the original course took the Yosemite Creek down a gorge to the west of its current location.

The primary source of Bridalveil Fall is Ostrander Lake, some 16 kilometers (9.9 mi) to the south.

In a brisk wind, the falling water is often blown sideways, and when the flow is light, it may not reach the ground directly below. Because of this, the Ahwahneechee Native Americans called this waterfall "Pohono", which means "Spirit of the Puffing Wind". On August 5, 1856, newspaper editor Warren Baer suggested the name Bridalveil Fall, inspired by its delicate, lacy appearance in late summer.

== See also ==
- Yosemite Firefall
- List of waterfalls
- List of waterfalls in California
