= Nevada Fall =

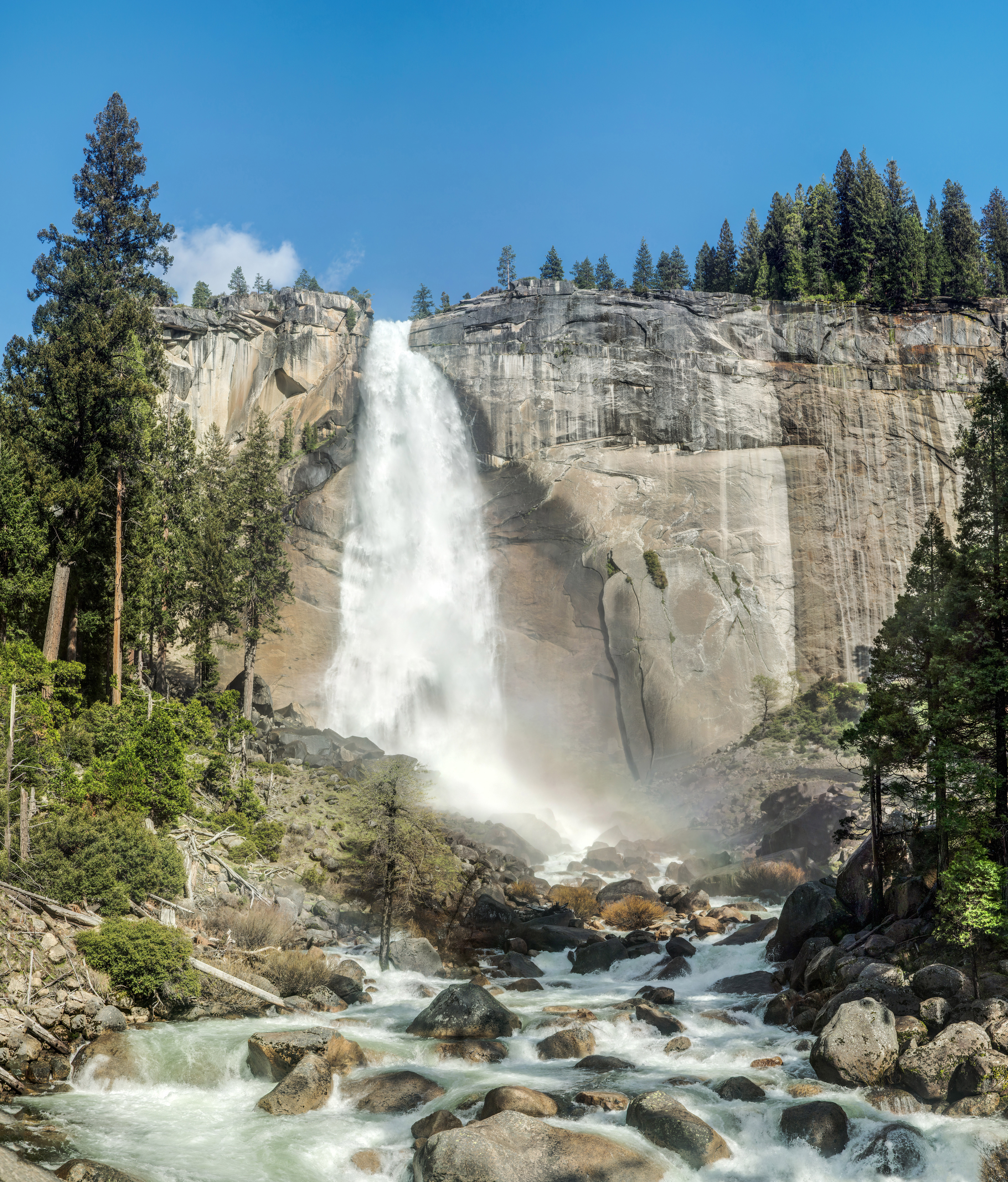
- Nevada Fall
- Interactive map of Nevada Fall
- Location: Yosemite Valley, Yosemite NP, Mariposa County, CA, US
- Coordinates: 37°43′29″N 119°32′00″W
- Type: Horsetail
- Total height: 594 ft (181 m)
- Number of drops: 1
- Longest drop: 480 ft (150 m)
- Watercourse: Merced River
- World height ranking: 576

Nevada Fall is a 594-foot-high (181 m) waterfall on the Merced River in Yosemite National Park, California. It is located below the granite dome, Liberty Cap, at the west end of Little Yosemite Valley. The waterfall is widely recognized by its "bent" shape, in which the water free-falls for roughly the first third of its length to a steep slick-rock slope. This mid-fall impact of the water on the cliff face creates a turbulent, whitewater appearance in the fall and produces a great deal of mist which covers a wide radius, which led to its current name (Nevada is a Spanish word meaning "snowy").

The Native American name was Yo-wy-we, signifying the twist or squirm of the falling water. Lafayette Bunnell suggested the name "Nevada" for the waterfall. He wrote, "The Nevada Fall was so called because it was the nearest to the Sierra Nevada, and because the name was sufficiently indicative of a wintry companion for our spring (Vernal Fall)... The white, foaming water, as it dashed down Yo-wy-we from the snowy mountains, represented to my mind a vast avalanche of snow."

The Emerald Pool forms on the "step" between Nevada Fall and Vernal Fall downstream. The 317-foot (97 m) high Vernal Fall is a short hike from the bottom of Nevada Fall. They form a cascade in which the Merced River flows down to Yosemite Valley.

This cascade is sometimes called the giant staircase, which is evident when viewed from above, at Glacier Point.

The hike to the top of Nevada Fall, along the Mist Trail, is 3 miles (4.8 km) from the trailhead in Yosemite Valley. One must first hike to Vernal Fall and then trek another 2 miles (3.2 km) to reach the top. The John Muir Trail, which starts near the trail to Happy Isles, goes to the top of Nevada Fall.

== Hazards ==
The pool above Nevada Fall remains a popular swimming location, with no park restrictions. In June 2018, an 18-year-old teenager fell to his death from the edge of the fall while attempting to take a selfie. In June 2026, a man fell in the water and fell to his death despite an attempted rescue by an ex-lifeguard, Freesia Gaul.

== See also ==
- List of waterfalls
- List of waterfalls in California
