= Lafayette Bunnell =

American physician, explorer, and writer (1824–1903)

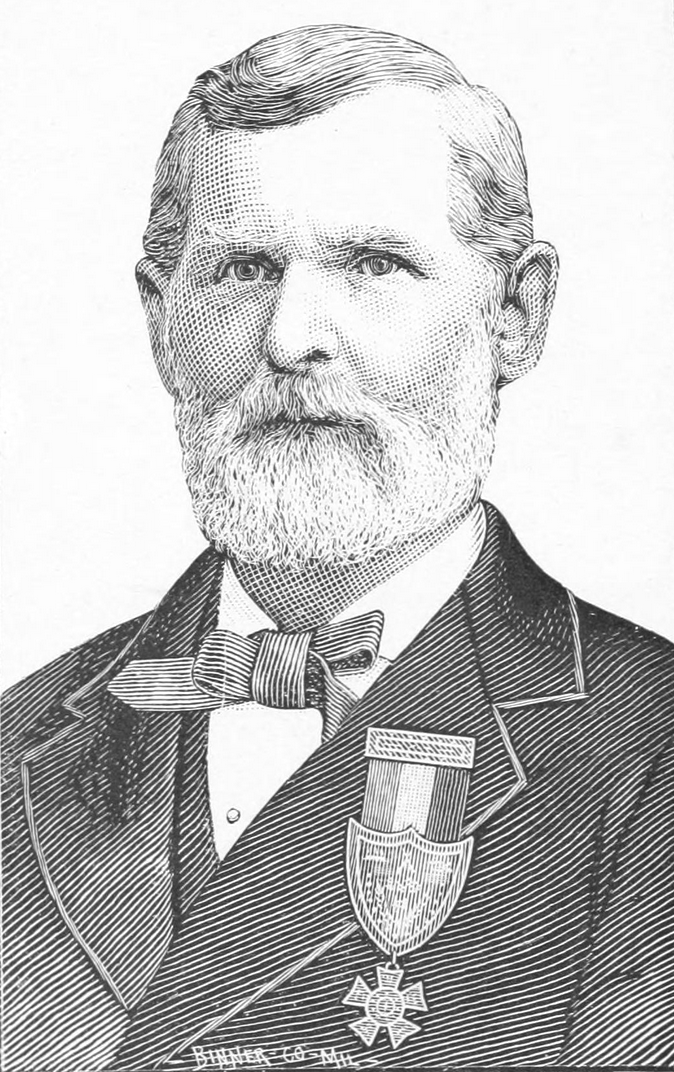
- Born: Lafayette Houghton Bunnell; March 13, 1824; Rochester, New York, USA
- Died: July 21, 1903 (aged 79); Homer, Minnesota
- Occupations: Army surgeon, explorer, historian
- Known for: Naming Yosemite

Signature
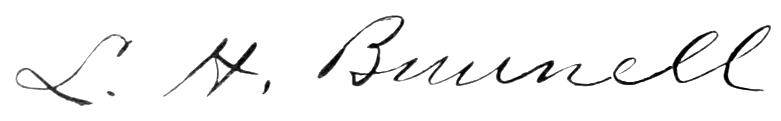

Lafayette Houghton Bunnell (March 13, 1824 – July 21, 1903) was an American medical doctor, writer, and explorer. He is most well known for his involvement with the Mariposa Battalion, the first non-Indians to enter Yosemite Valley, and his book Discovery of the Yosemite and the Indian War of 1851. Bunnell led the battalion members in a vote to name the valley, and for this reason he is often credited as the person who named Yosemite. He was also a soldier and surgeon in the United States war with Mexico and the Civil War.

== Biography ==
Bunnell was born in Rochester, New York on March 13, 1824. His father Bradley Bunnell and his uncle Douglass Houghton (both physicians) were a major influence on young Lafayette, especially instilling in him a desire to seek adventure in "the West." In 1832 Bunnell's father Bradley decided to move to Detroit, although the family stayed over in Buffalo prior to the final move; because of a cholera epidemic, Bradley Bunnell was called on to treat the sick. When they did finally settle in Detroit, young Bunnell was friends with the Ojibwe, Potowatami and French-Canadian youth. He attended a catholic school, not because he was catholic but because it was the best school in the town.

In 1845 Bunnell's father returned to Detroit. After settling various business affairs, Bunnell followed him and recommenced studying medicine under Dr. Scoville. When the War with Mexico broke out, Bunnell enlisted and worked as an orderly. For a while he was in charge of the hospital in Cordova, and had medical command of a regiment when they returned to Michigan at the end of the war. After being mustered out, rumors of the gold strike in California were confirmed by President Polk, and Bunnell decided to seek his fortune in California. He traveled overland by way of Texas and Mexico.

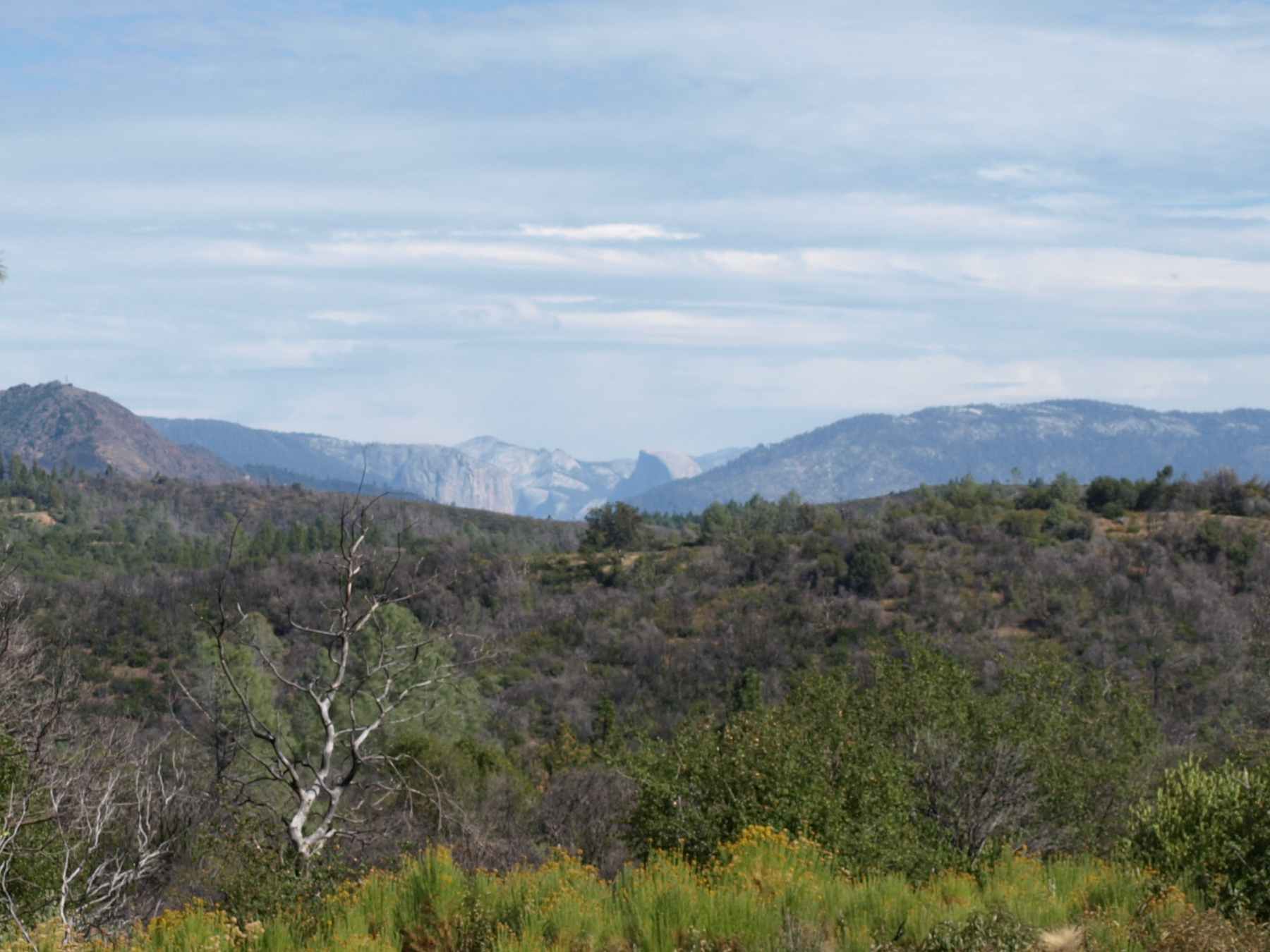
Yosemite Valley from a distance similar to the first view Lafayette Bunnell had in the winter of 1850. At the time he knew nothing about the valley, just that it looked intriguing.

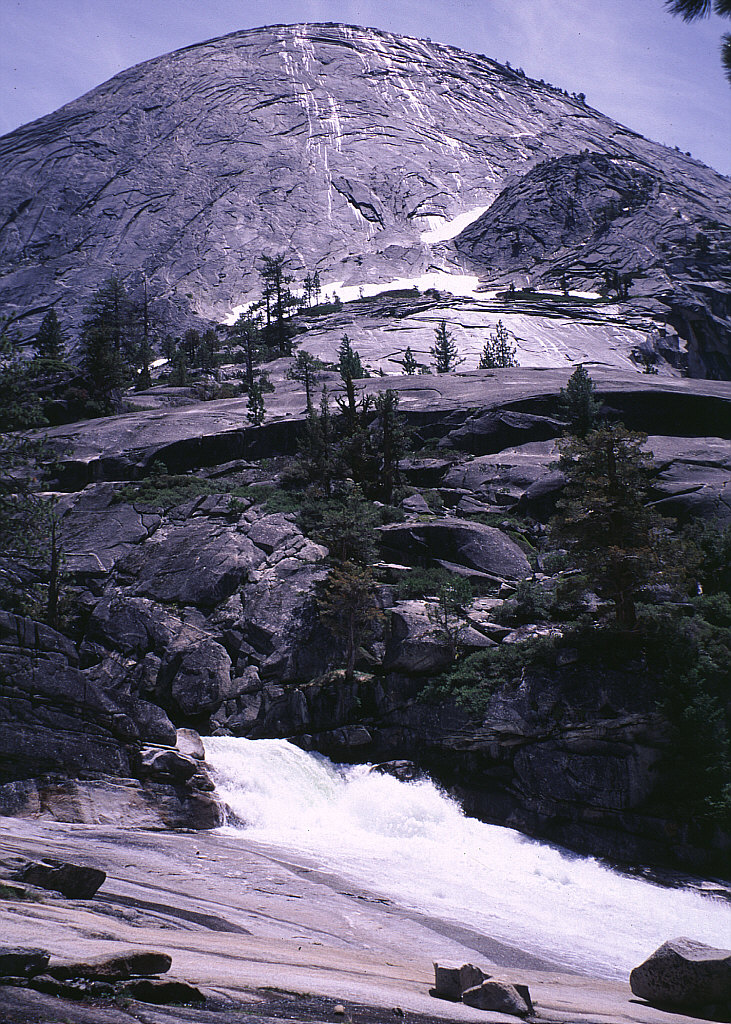
The Bunnell Cascade below Bunnell Point in Yosemite NP, features named in honor of Lafayette Bunnell

During the winter of 1849–50, while ascending the old Bear Valley trail from Ridley's ferry, on the Merced river, my attention was attracted to the stupendous rocky peaks of the Sierra Nevadas. In the distance an immense cliff loomed, apparently to the summit of the mountains. Although familiar with nature in her wildest moods, I looked upon this awe-inspiring column with wonder and admiration. ... Whenever an opportunity afforded, I made inquiries concerning the scenery of that locality. But few of the miners had noticed any of its special peculiarities.

— Lafayette Houghton Bunnell, Discovery of the Yosemite and the Indian War of 1851 Which Led to That Event

In 1851, Bunnell was a member of the Mariposa Battalion that became the non-indigenous discoverers of the Yosemite Valley. Discovery was not the main purpose of the trip: the Battalion rode out in search of Native American tribal leaders involved in recent raids on American settlements. Bunnell explored the Valley and named many of its features. Discovery of the Yosemite, and the Indian war of 1851 (1880) contains his account of his exploration and the actions of the Battalion. The majority of what is known about Chief Tenaya and the Ahwahnechee was from Bunnell's written accounts. Bunnell was the first person who encountered Chief Tenaya who subsequently wrote a book.

Bunnell later served as a surgeon in the American Civil War. After the war he moved to Homer, Minnesota and married Sarah Smith. Although he practiced medicine a little, for the most part he lived off his army pensions and wrote histories of the upper Mississippi. He died in Homer on July 21, 1903.

== Legacy ==
Bunnell Point at the east end of Little Yosemite Valley is named in his honour.

== Bibliography ==
- Bunnell, Lafayette Houghton (2003) [1880]. Discovery of the Yosemite and the Indian War of 1851 Which Led to That Event. Washington, D.C.: Library of Congress, National Digital Library Program. OCLC 51675913.
- Bunnell, Lafayette Houghton. Winona (We-No-Nah) and Its Environs on the Mississippi in Ancient and Modern Days. Winona, Minn: Jones & Kroeger, printers and publishers, 1897.
- Bunnell, Lafayette Houghton. The Date of the Discovery of the Yosemite. New York: Century Co, 1890.
