= Emerald Pool (Yosemite National Park) =

Green lake in US park

Coordinates: 37.7276°N 119.5424°W

Emerald Pool is a small stream pool in the Merced River above Vernal Fall in Yosemite National Park. It is named for its deep green color, which is caused by algae living on the rocks at the bottom of the pool. In the summertime during diminished water flow, the Silver Apron (a smooth granite slope over which the Merced River flows into the Emerald Pool) is frequently (albeit illegally) used by hikers as a water slide. Swimming or wading in the Emerald Pool or entering the Silver Apron is prohibited by the National Park Service since waders or swimmers have been swept over Vernal Fall and killed, and people sliding down Silver Apron risk collision with hidden rocks at its lower end. This prohibition is clearly marked with signs.

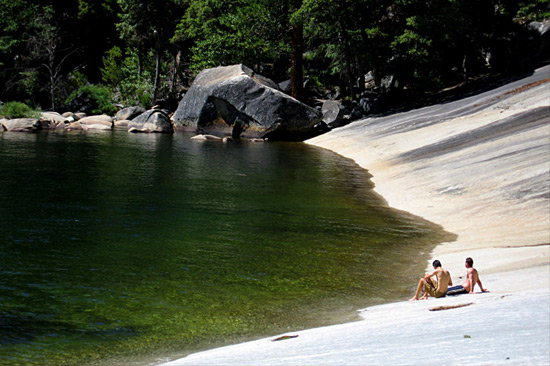
Emerald Pool in Yosemite National Park

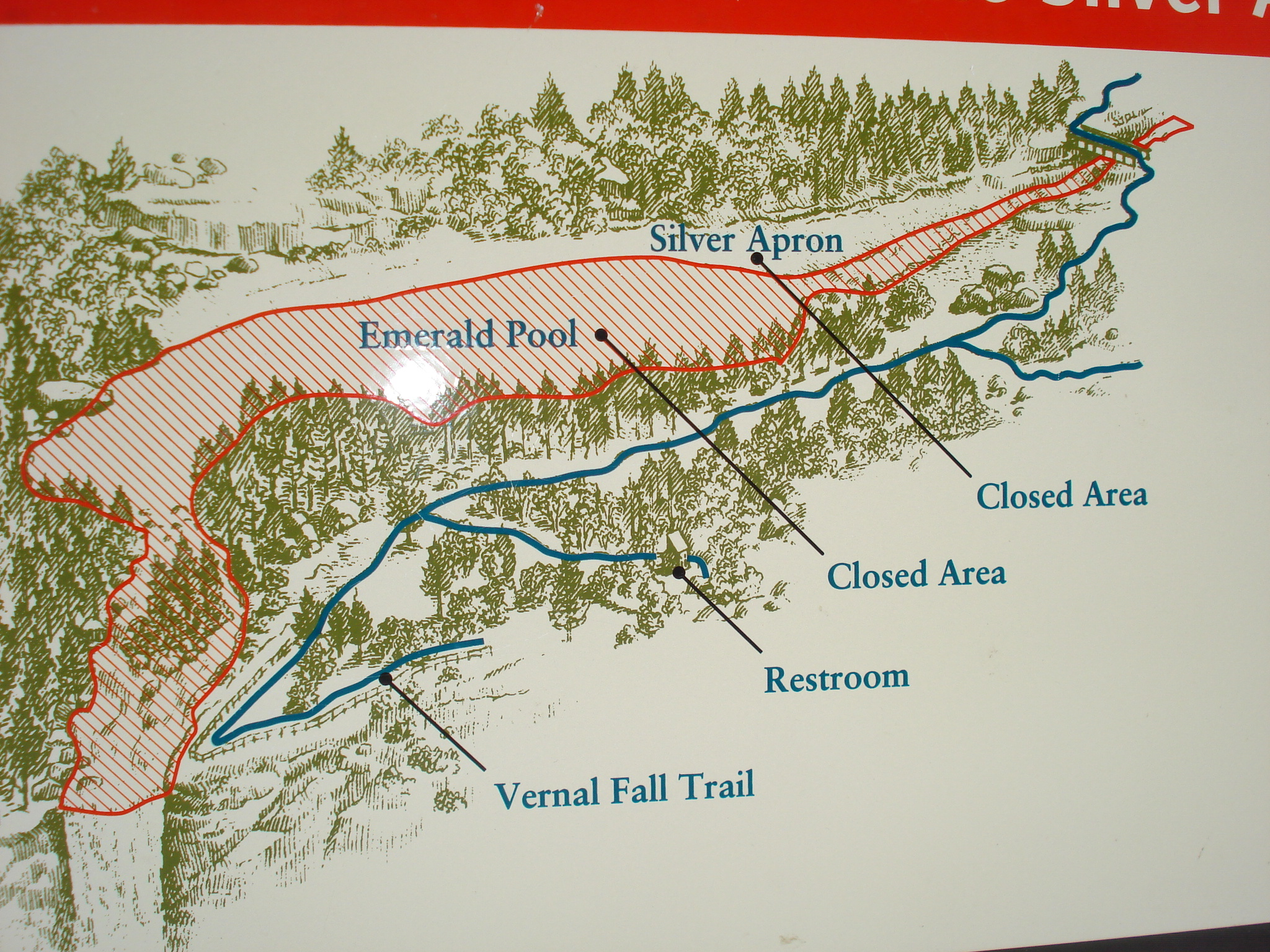
One of the warning signs prohibiting swimming or wading in Emerald Pool

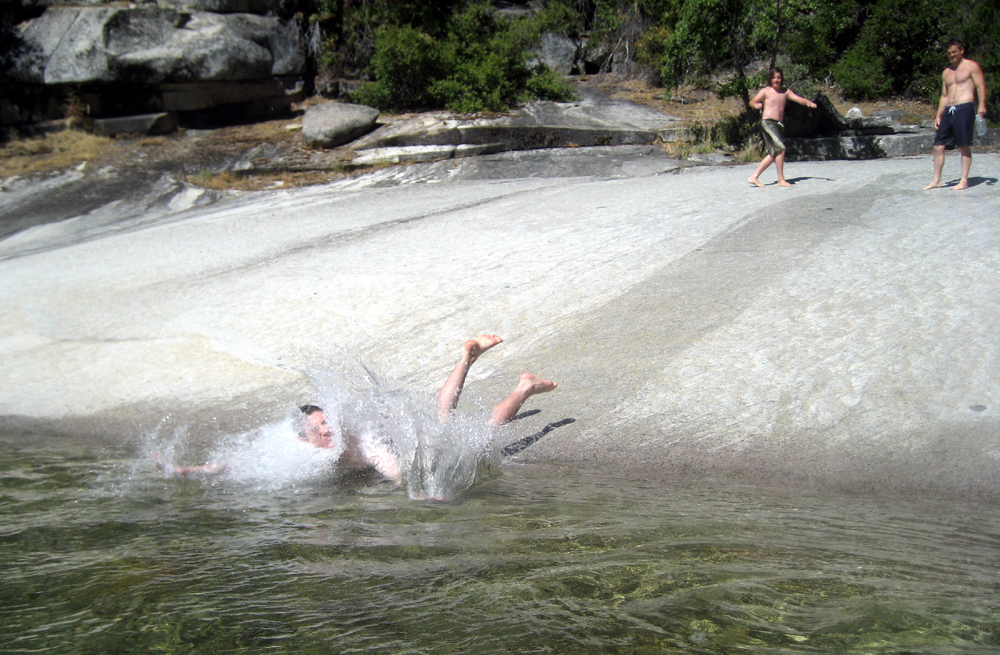
Visitors slide down the granite into Emerald Pool in violation of park rules.
