= Yosemite Valley =

Glacial valley in California, United States

- Ahwahnee Valley
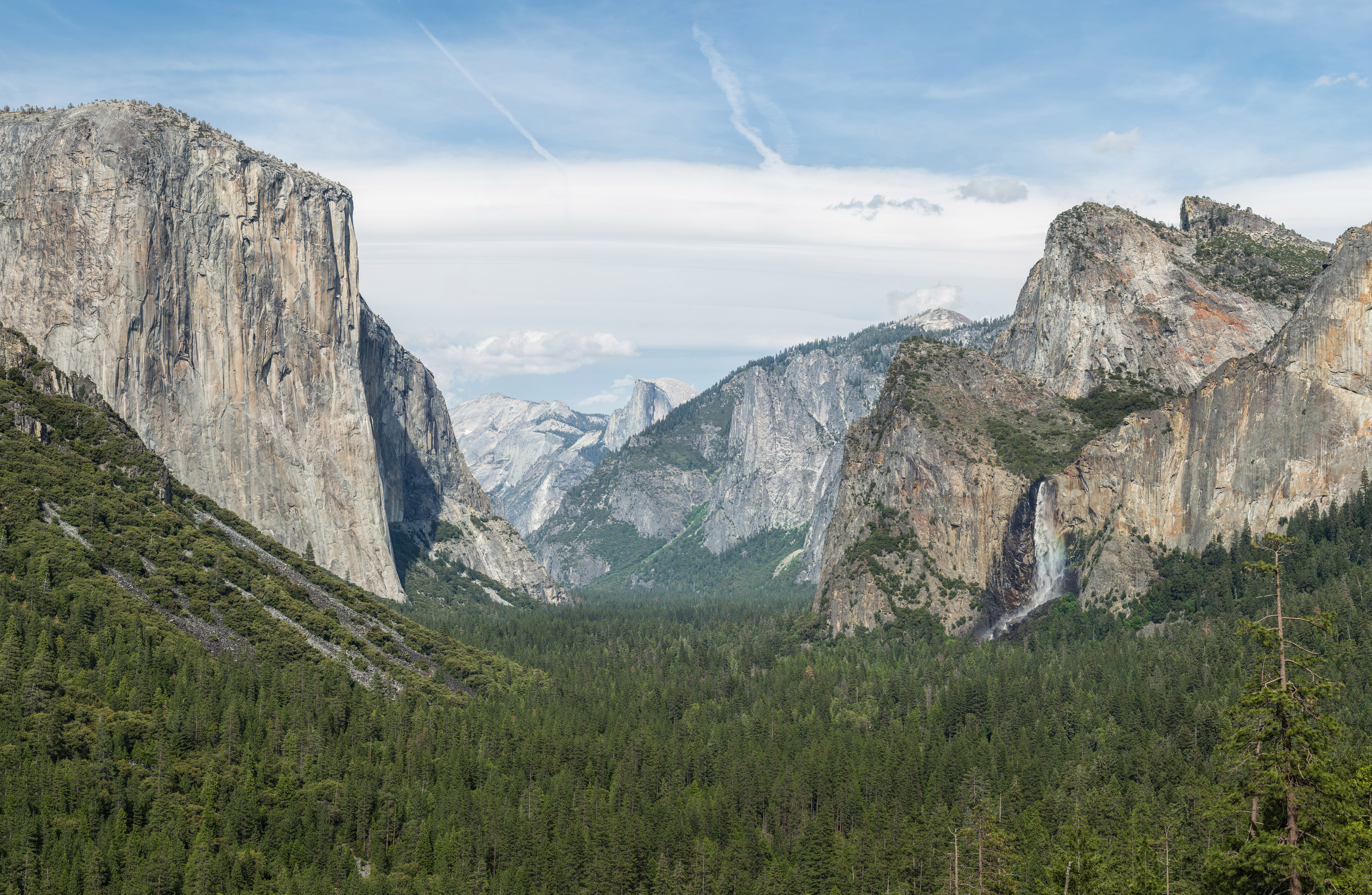
- Yosemite Valley as seen from Tunnel View in May 2013

- Location within California
- Floor elevation: 4,000 feet (1,200 m)
- Length: 7.5 miles (12 km)
- Width: 1 mile (1.6 km)

Geography
- Coordinates: 37°43′18″N 119°38′47″W
- River: Merced River
- Interactive map of Yosemite Valley
- Yosemite Valley
- U.S. National Register of Historic Places
- U.S. Historic district
- California Historical Landmark
- Area: 3,800 acres (1,500 ha)
- Architect: Herbert Maier; Frederick Law Olmsted; Gilbert Stanley Underwood; Daniel Ray Hull; Thomas Chalmers Vint
- Architectural style: Bungalow/Craftsman, NPS Rustic
- NRHP reference No.: 04001159
- CHISL No.: 790
- Added to NRHP: December 14, 2006

Yosemite Valley (/joʊˈsɛməti/ yoh-SEM-ə-tee; Yosemite, Miwok for "killer") is a glacial valley in Yosemite National Park in the western Sierra Nevada mountains of Central California, United States. The valley is about 7.5 mi (12.1 km) long and 3,000–3,500 ft (910–1,070 m) deep, surrounded by high granite summits such as Half Dome and El Capitan, and densely forested with pines. The valley is drained by the Merced River, and a multitude of streams and waterfalls flow into it, including Tenaya, Illilouette, Yosemite and Bridalveil Creeks. Yosemite Falls is the highest waterfall in North America and is a big attraction, especially in the spring, when the water flow is at its peak. The valley is renowned for its natural environment and is regarded as the centerpiece of Yosemite National Park.

The valley is the main attraction in the park for the majority of visitors and a bustling hub of activity during tourist season in the summer months. Most visitors enter the valley from roads to the west and pass through the Tunnel View entrance. Visitor facilities are in the center of the valley. There are both hiking trail loops that stay within the valley and trailheads that lead to higher elevations.

== Descriptions ==
Yosemite Valley is on the western slope of the Sierra Nevada mountains, 150 miles (240 km) east of San Francisco. It stretches for 7.5 miles (12.1 km) in a roughly east–west direction, with an average width of about 1 mile (1.6 km).

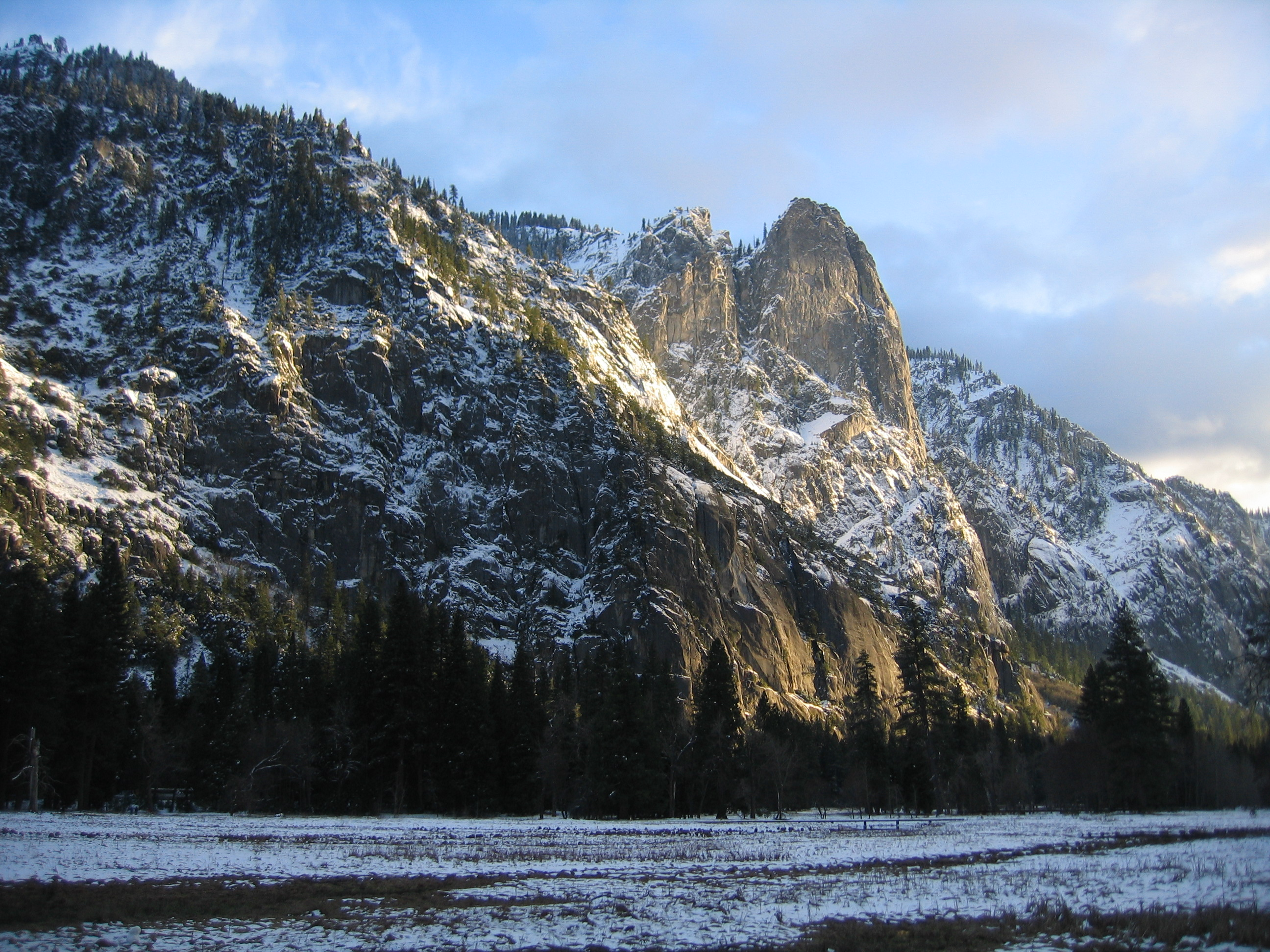
Sentinel Rock at sunset

Yosemite Valley represents only one percent of the park area, but it is where most visitors arrive and stay. More than half a dozen creeks tumble from hanging valleys at the top of granite cliffs that can rise 3,000–3,500 feet (910–1,070 m) above the valley floor, which itself is 4,000 ft (1,200 m) above sea level. These streams combine into the Merced River, which flows out from the western end of the valley, down the rest of its canyon to the San Joaquin Valley. The flat floor of Yosemite Valley holds both forest and large open meadows, which have views of the surrounding crests and waterfalls.

Below is a description of these features, looking first at the walls above, moving west to east as a visitor does when entering the valley, then visiting the waterfalls and other water features, returning east to west with the flow of water.

The first view of Yosemite Valley many visitors see is the Tunnel View. So many paintings were made from a viewpoint nearby that the National Park Service named that viewpoint Artist Point. The view from the lower (western) end of the Valley contains the great granite monolith El Capitan on the left, and Cathedral Rocks on the right with Bridalveil Fall. Just past this spot the Valley suddenly widens with the Cathedral Spires, then the pointed obelisk of Sentinel Rock to the south. Across the Valley on the northern side are the Three Brothers, rising one above the other like gables built on the same angle – the highest crest is Eagle Peak, with the two below known as the Middle and Lower Brothers.

Yosemite Valley

To this point the Valley has been curving gently to the left (north). Now a grand curve back to the right begins, with Yosemite Falls on the north, followed by the Royal Arches, topped by North Dome. Opposite, to the south, is Glacier Point, 3,254 feet (992 m) above the Valley floor. At this point the Valley splits in two, one section slanting northeast, with the other curving from south to southeast. Between them, at the eastern end of the valley, is Half Dome, among the most prominent natural features in the Sierra Nevada. Above and to the northeast of Half Dome is Clouds Rest, at 9,924 feet (3,025 m); it is the highest point near Yosemite Valley.

== Water ==
Snow melting in the Sierra forms creeks and lakes. In the surrounding region, these creeks flow to the edge of the Valley to form cataracts and waterfalls.

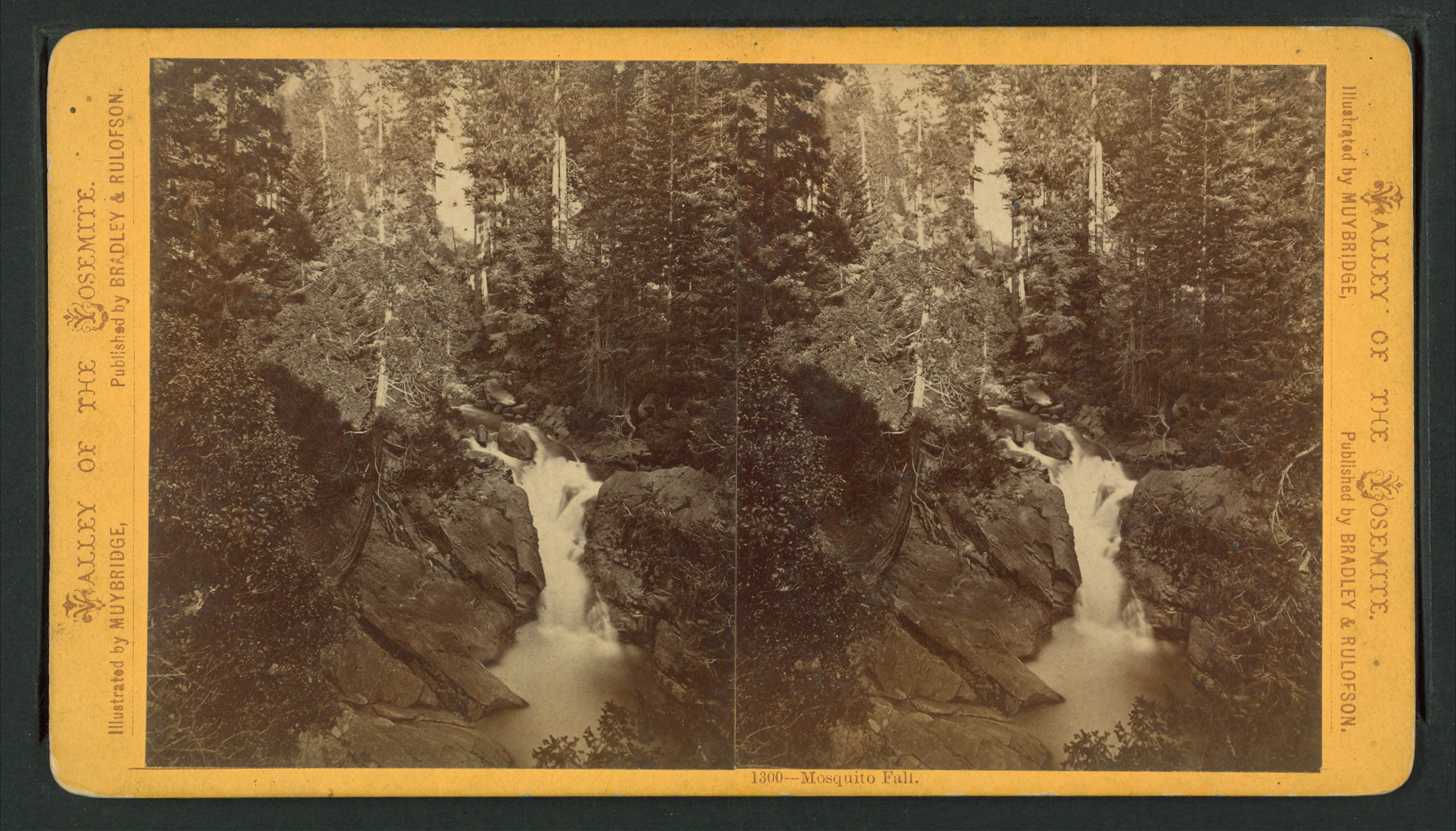
Mosquito Fall, stereographic photo by Eadweard Muybridge, c. 1868–1873

A fan of creeks and forks of the Merced River take drainage from the Sierra crest and combine at Merced Lake. The Merced then flows down to the end of its canyon (Little Yosemite Valley), where it begins what is often called the Giant Staircase. The first drop is Nevada Fall, which drops 594 feet (181 m), bouncing off the granite slope below it. Below is Vernal Fall, 317 feet (97 m) high, one of the most picturesque waterfalls in the Valley. The Merced then descends rapids to meet Illilouette Creek, which drops from the valley rim to form Illilouette Fall. They combine at the base of the gorges that contain each stream, and then flow around the Happy Isles to meet Tenaya Creek at the eastern end of Yosemite Valley proper.

Tenaya Creek flows southwest from Tenaya Lake and down Tenaya Canyon, finally flowing between Half Dome and North Dome before joining the Merced River. The following falls tumble from the Valley rim to join it at various points:

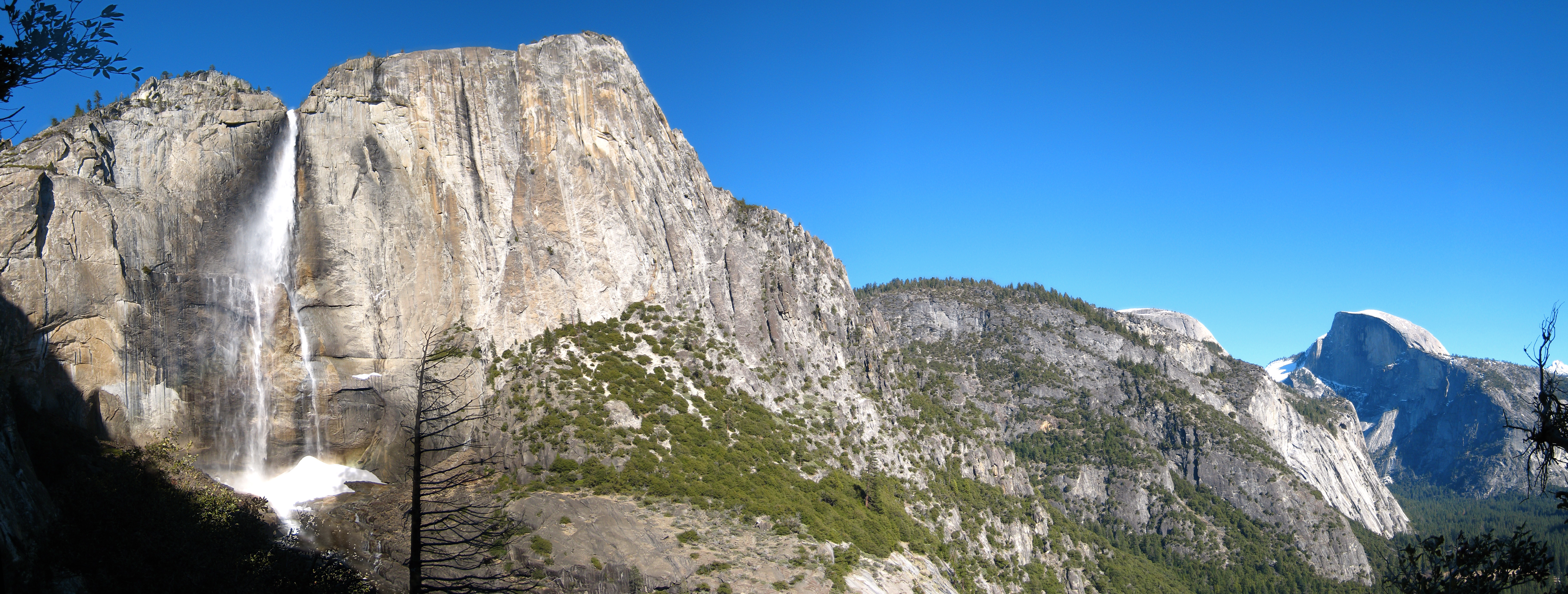
Yosemite Falls and Half Dome in the winter

- Yosemite Falls 2,425 feet (739 m) Upper Yosemite Fall 1,430 feet (440 m), the middle cascades 670 feet (200 m), and Lower Yosemite Fall 320 feet (98 m). (Yosemite Creek)
- Snow Creek Falls 2,140 feet (650 m)
- Sentinel Falls 1,920 feet (590 m)
- Ribbon Fall 1,612 feet (491 m)
- Royal Arch Cascade 1,250 feet (380 m)
- Lehamite Falls 1,180 feet (360 m)
- Staircase Falls 1,020 feet (310 m)
- Bridalveil Fall 620 feet (190 m). (Bridalveil Creek)
- Nevada Fall 594 feet (181 m)
- Silver Strand Falls 574 feet (175 m)
- Vernal Fall 318 feet (97 m)

== Natural Yosemite Valley ==
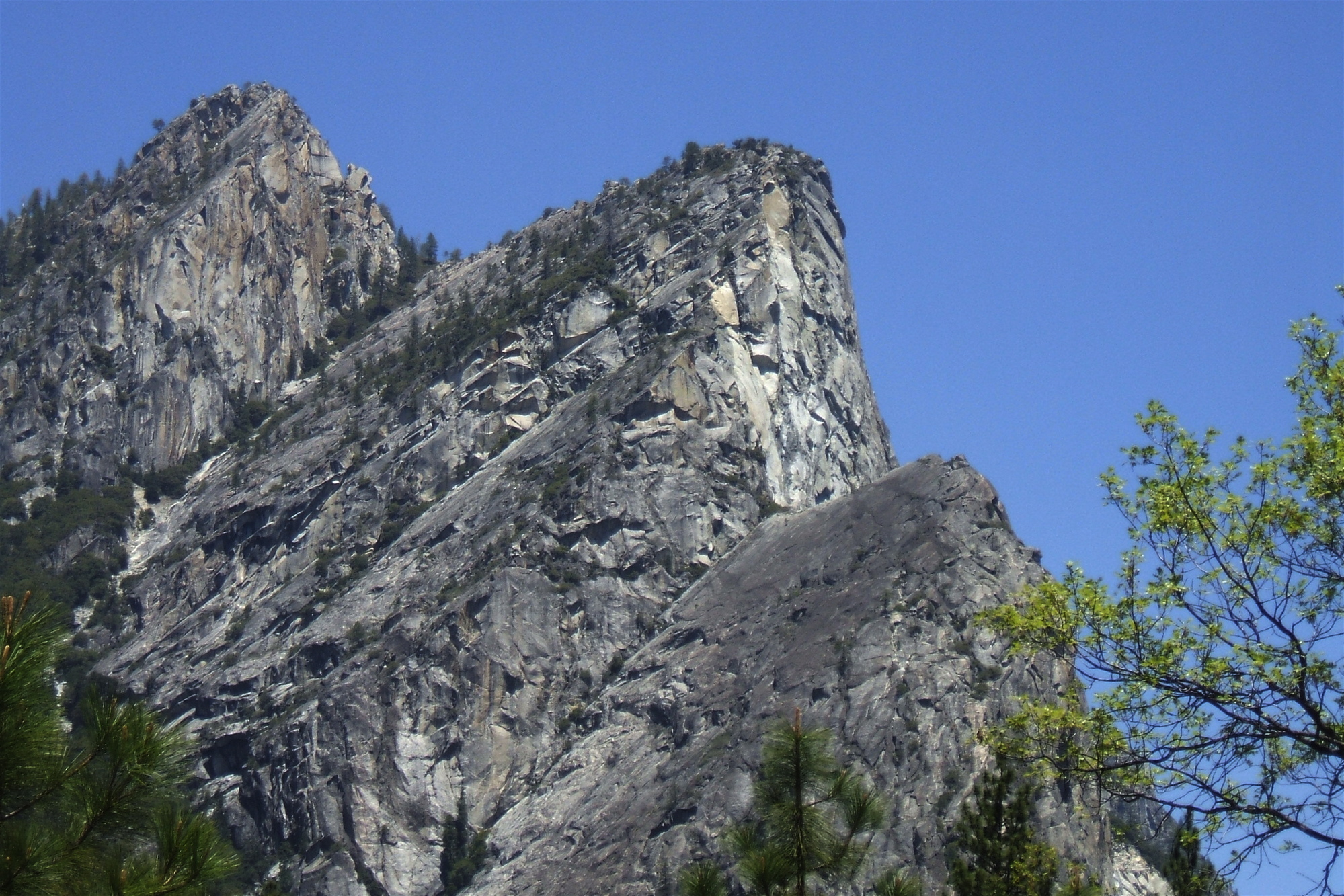
The Three Brothers formed from the El Capitan pluton

=== Geology ===
The features in Yosemite Valley are made of granitic rock emplaced as plutons miles deep during the late Cretaceous. Over time the Sierra Nevada was uplifted, exposing this rock to erosion at the surface.

There are many types of granite found in Yosemite Valley with the most prominent being El Capitan Granite, Sentinel Granodiorite, Taft Granite, and Half Dome Granodiorite. Majority of the minerals found in the granite include quartz, potassium and plagioclase feldspar, biotite, and hornsblende. The oldest of these granitic rocks, at 114 million years, occur along the Merced River Gorge west of the valley. The El Capitan pluton intruded the valley, forming most of the granitic rock that makes up much of the central part of the valley, including Cathedral Rocks, Three Brothers, and El Capitan. The youngest Yosemite Valley pluton is the 87-million-year-old Half Dome granodiorite, which makes up most of the rock at Glacier Point, the Royal Arches, and its namesake, Half Dome.

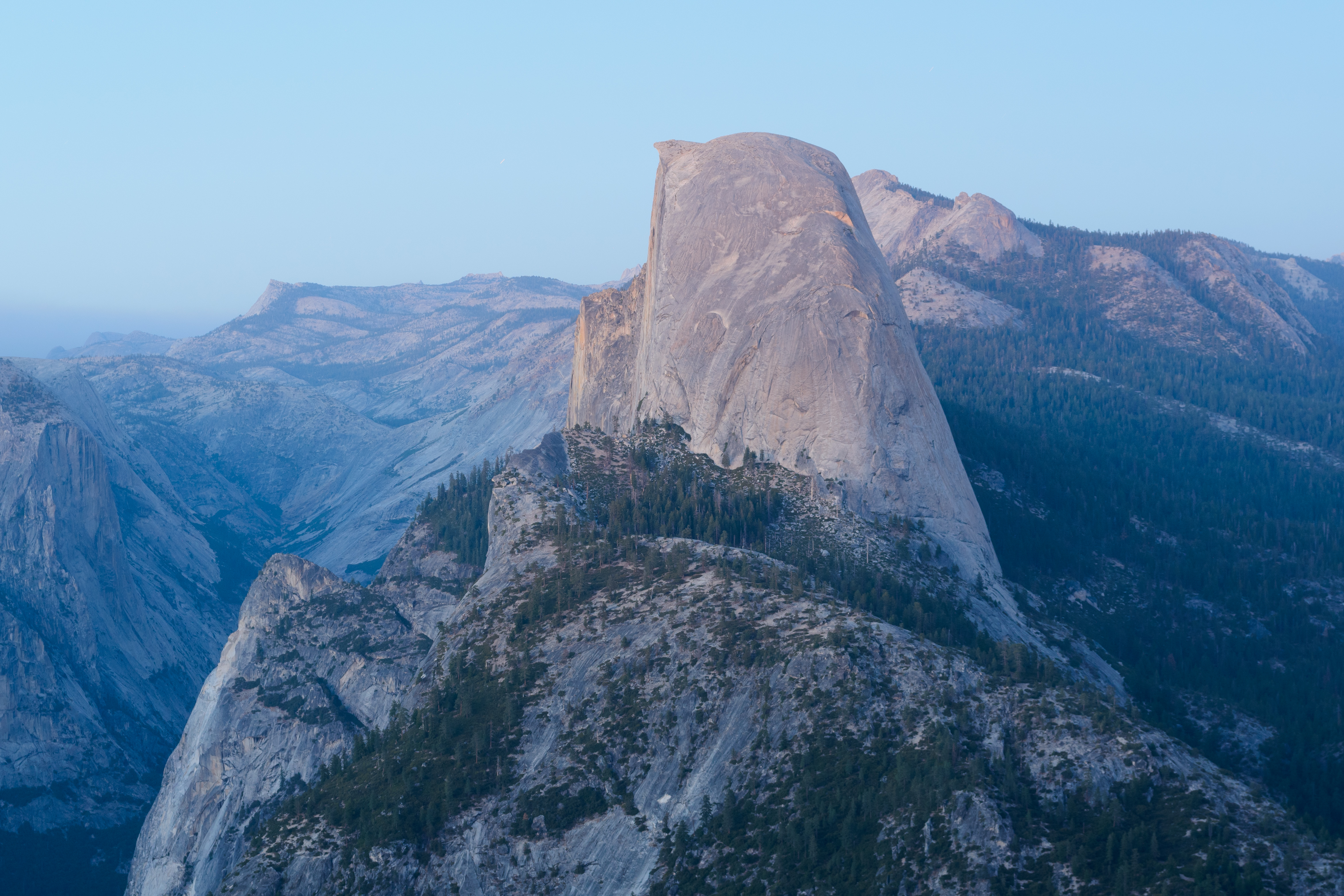
Half Dome from Washburn Point

Before Yosemite Valley was a valley, it was formed by sediment deposits, streams, rock uplift and falls, volcanoes, and glaciers.(1,2) The formation of the valley can be divided into four stages differentiated by exposure of granite, depth of the valley, and water features. (1) Streams were largely responsible for the deepening of the area into a valley and eroding metamorphic and sedimentary rock to reveal granite. (3) For the last 30 million years, glaciers have periodically filled much of the valley. The most current glaciation, the Wisconsinian was not, however, the most severe. Ice ages previous to the Wisconsinian were colder and lasted longer. Their glaciers were huge and covered nearly all the landmarks around Yosemite Valley except Half Dome, Eagle Peak, Sentinel Dome, and the top of El Capitan. Wisconsinian glaciers, however, only reached Bridalveil Fall in the valley.

After the retreat of many of these glaciers, a stand of Ancient Lake Yosemite developed. The valley floor owes its flatness to sediment deposited by these stands (the last glaciers in the valley were small and did not remove much old lake sediment). The last stand of Lake Yosemite was about 5.5 miles (8.9 km) long and was impounded by a terminal moraine near the base of El Capitan. It was later filled by sediment, becoming a swampy meadow.

The parallel Tenaya Canyon and Little Yosemite Canyon glaciers were, at their largest, 2,000 feet (610 m) deep where they flowed into the Yosemite Valley near the base of Half Dome. They also formed Clouds Rest behind Half Dome as an arête.

Near Glacier Point there are 2,000 feet (610 m) of mostly glacial sediment with at least six separate sequences of Lake Yosemite sediments. Here, huge and highly erosive pre-Wisconsinian glaciers excavated the bedrock valley floor, and much smaller Wisconsinian glaciers deposited glacial debris.

=== Ecology ===
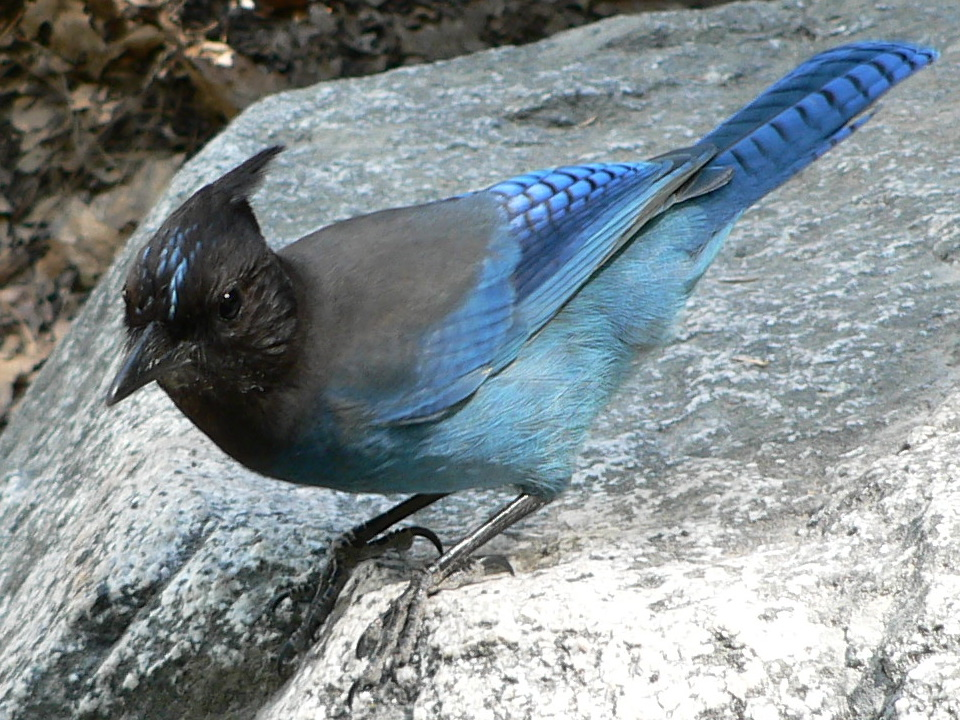
Steller's jay

The biological community of Yosemite Valley is a diverse one. The valley can be divided into two regions, the lower mountain forest with hot, dry summers and cool, moist winters where there can be a couple feet of snow fall, and the upper mountain forest with short moist summers and cool wet winters with snow lasting from November through June.

The animals that make up the community include various birds, mammals, fish, amphibians, reptiles, and insects. There are over 142 species of birds, prominently the California Warbler, Western Robin, and the Western Chipping Sparrow. There are approximately 90 species of mammals including shrews, bats, mice and rats, squirrels and chipmunks, rabbits, bears, large cats, and foxes. Few reptiles and amphibians are in the area due to the altitude. There are several animals that are listed as threatened species such as the Sierra Nevada red fox, Wolverine, Sierra Nevada bighorn sheep, and the pacific fisher.

Many plants have been identified in Yosemite Valley ranging from wildflowers to trees. Common trees in the area include the California Black Oak, Ponderosa Pine, Incense Cedar, Red Fir, Lodgepole Pine, Jefferey Pine, and Western Juniper. Sugar pine, white fir, interior live oak, coast Douglas-fir, California laurel, bigleaf maple, Scouler's willow, Pacific dogwood, white alder, and western balsam poplar can also be found.

Shrubs commonly found in the area include whiteleaf manzanita, mountain misery, western azalea, American dogwood, buckbrush, deer brush, sierra gooseberry.

Many wildflowers can be found throughout the year, but are most prominent from June through August. Prevalent wildflowers include the Sierra Lessingia, Monkey Flower, Beardtongue, Parasitic flowers, Shooting Stars, Lupines, and Buttercups. Other forms of flora include those of the Buckwheat, Purslane, Pink, Mustard, Pea, Evening Primrose, Mint, Figwort, and Composite families.

== Tourism ==
Bridalveil Falls from Valley View, El Capitan on the left, Merced River in the foreground

Yosemite National Park had a record number of 5 million visitors in 2016. In 2020 visitation dropped to 2,268,313 visitors. A reservation system was implemented in 2020, which required a reservation in order to enter the park. The reservation system has been periodically lifted and reimplemented since 2021.

On July 24, 2018, several areas of the park, including the Valley, were closed due to wildfires in the area.

=== Hiking ===
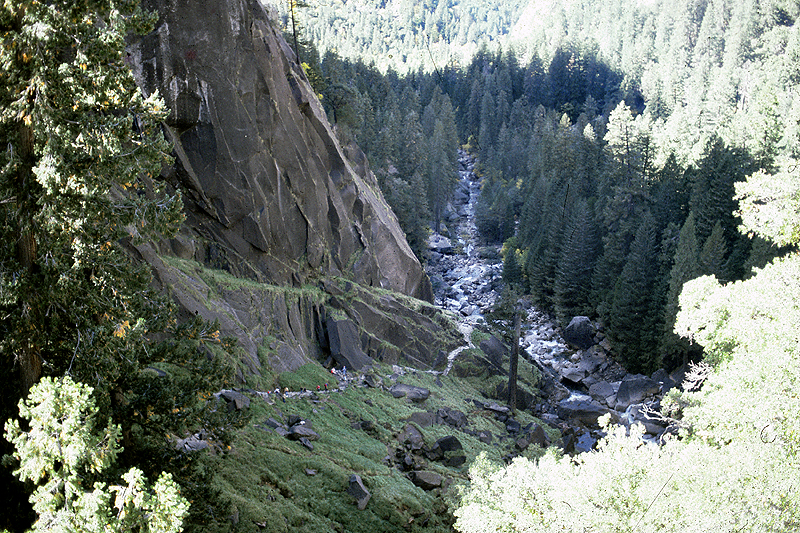
The Mist Trail, as seen from the top of Vernal Falls

Several trails lead out of the Valley, including

- The John Muir Trail – running 211 miles (340 km) to Mount Whitney
- The Mist Trail – with views of Vernal Fall and Nevada Fall
- The Four Mile Trail – leading to Glacier Point.
- The Yosemite Falls Trail – to the top of Yosemite Falls

=== Climbing ===
Yosemite is now a world rock climbing attraction. The massive 'big walls' of granite have been climbed countless times since the 1950s and have pushed climbers' abilities to new heights. While climbers traditionally take several days to climb the monoliths, bivvying on the rock faces, modern climbing techniques help climbers ascend the cliffs in mere hours. Many climbers stay at Camp 4 before beginning big wall climbs, which became notable after World War II as "a birthplace of rock climbing’s modern age" and was introduced into the National Register of Historic Places in 2003.

Half Dome figures prominently on the reverse side of the California state quarter. Hiking to the top of Half Dome is one of the most popular hikes from the valley, and very crowded. In 2010 the park shifted to permit system, where hikers would apply for a permit and get assigned a day where they could do the hike.

== History ==
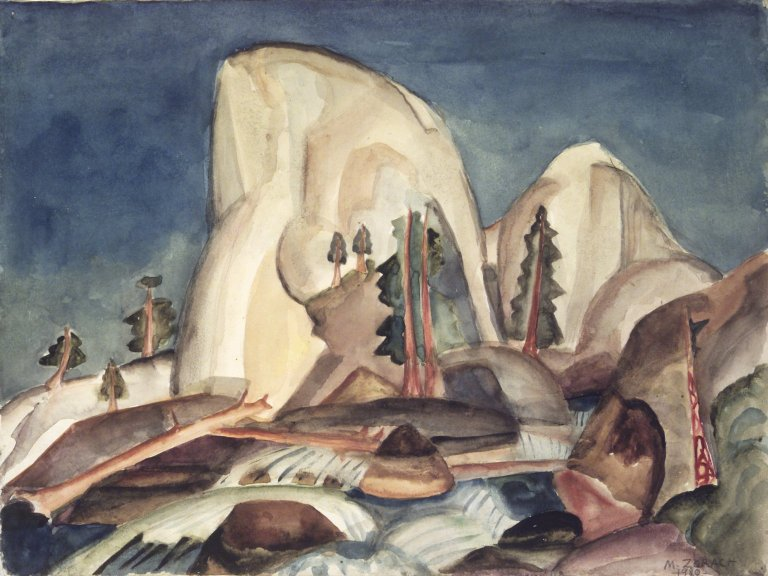
Half Dome and Liberty Cap, Yosemite Valley, California. Marguerite Zorach (Brooklyn Museum)

=== Native Americans in Yosemite ===
Habitation of the Yosemite Valley proper can be traced to about 3,000 years ago when vegetation and game in the region was similar to that present today; the western slopes of the Sierra Nevada had acorns, deer, and salmon, while the eastern Sierra had pinyon nuts and obsidian. The prehistory of the area is divided into three cultural phases on archaeological grounds: the "Crane Flat" phase, (1000 BCE to 500 CE) is marked by hunting with the atl atl and the use of grinding stones; the "Tarmarack" phase (500 to 1200 CE), marked by a shift to using smaller rock points, indicating development and use of the bow and arrow; and the "Mariposa" phase, from 1200 until European contact in the mid-19th century.

In the 19th century, it was inhabited by a Miwok band who called the Valley "Ah-wah-nee" and themselves the Ahwahnechee. This group had trading and family ties to Mono Lake Paiutes from the eastern side of the Sierra Nevada. They annually burned the vegetation on the Valley floor, which promoted the black oak and kept the meadows and forests open. This protected the supply of their principal food, acorns, and reduced the chance of ambush. At the time of first European contact, this band was led by Chief Tenaya (Teneiya), who was raised by his mother among the Mono Lake Paiutes.

=== The Mariposa Battalion and the first tourists ===
The first non-Native Americans to see Yosemite Valley were probably members of the 1833 Joseph Walker Party, which was the first to cross the Sierra Nevada from east to west. The first descriptions of Yosemite, however, came nearly 20 years later. The 1849 California Gold Rush led to conflicts between miners and Native Americans, and the state formed the volunteer Mariposa Battalion as a punitive expedition against the Native Americans living in the Yosemite area. In 1851, the Battalion was led by Major Jim Savage, whose trading post on the Merced River the Awaneechee had raided. This and other missions (the Mariposa Wars) resulted in Chief Teneiya and the Awaneechee spending months on a reservation in the San Joaquin Valley. The band returned the next year to the Valley but took refuge among the Mono Paiutes after further conflicts with miners. Most of the Awaneechee (along with Teneiya) were chased back to the Valley and killed by the Paiutes after violating hospitality by stealing horses.

While the members of that first expedition of the Mariposa Battalion had heard rumors of what could be found up the Merced River, none were prepared for what they saw March 27, 1851, from what is now called Old Inspiration Point (close to the better-visited Tunnel View). Dr. Lafayette Bunnell later wrote:

The grandeur of the scene was but softened by the haze that hung over the valley – light as gossamer – and by the clouds which partially dimmed the higher cliffs and mountains. This obscurity of vision but increased the awe with which I beheld it, and as I looked, a peculiar exalted sensation seemed to fill my whole being, and I found my eyes in tears with emotion.

Camping that night on the Valley floor, the group agreed with the suggestion of Dr. Bunnell to call it "Yo-sem-i-ty", mistakenly believing that was the native name. The term is from the Southern Sierra Miwok word Yohhe'meti, meaning "those who kill", which surrounding tribes used to refer to the tribe inhabiting the valley.

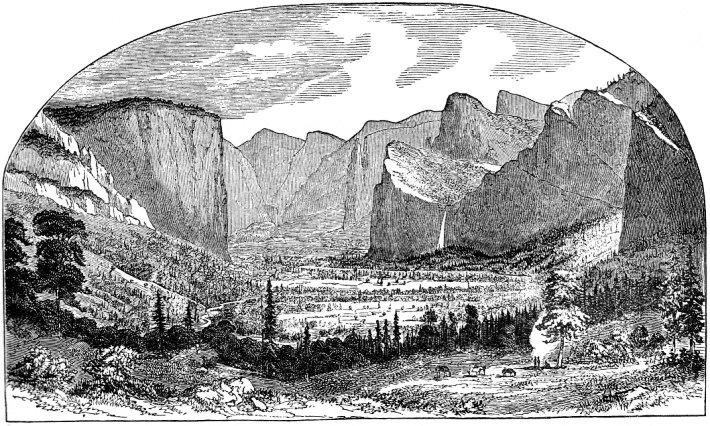
The First Picture of Yosemite Valley by Thomas Ayres, 1855

James Hutchings—who organized the first tourist party to the Valley in 1855—and artist Thomas Ayers generated much of the earliest publicity about Yosemite, creating articles and entire magazine issues about the Valley. Ayres' highly detailed angularly exaggerated artwork and his written accounts were distributed nationally and an art exhibition of his drawings was held in New York City.

Two of Hutchings' first group of tourists, Milton and Houston Mann, built the first toll route into the valley, with the development of the first hotels in the area and other trails quickly following. Many of the early pioneers in the valley of European descent, and a few Native Americans, are buried in Yosemite Cemetery.

=== Yosemite: The first state park ===
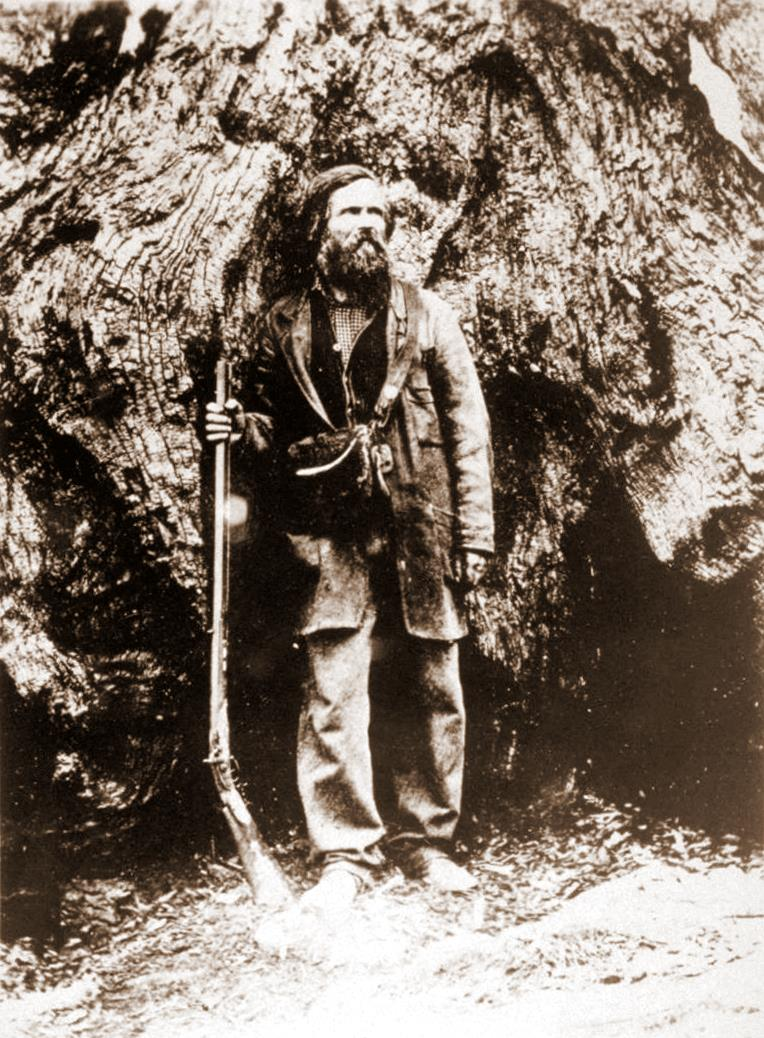
Galen Clark in the Big Tree Grove

The work of Ayres gave Easterners an appreciation for Yosemite Valley and started a movement to preserve it. Influential figures such as Galen Clark, clergyman Thomas Starr King and leading landscape architect Frederick Law Olmsted were among those who urged Senator John Conness of California to try to preserve Yosemite.

President Abraham Lincoln signed a bill, during the civil war, on June 30, 1864. Granting Yosemite Valley and the Mariposa Grove of giant sequoias to the State of California, making the first park, "for public use, resort and recreation", the two tracts "shall be inalienable for all time". This was the first time in history that a federal government had set aside scenic lands simply to protect them and to allow for their enjoyment by all people.

Simply designating an area a park isn't sufficient to protect it. California did not set up an administration for the park until 1866 when the state appointed Galen Clark as the park's guardian. An 11-year struggle followed to resolve homesteading claims in the valley. The challenge of increasing tourism, with the need to first build stagecoach roads, then the Yosemite Valley Railroad, along with hotels and other facilities in and around the Valley was met during the rest of the 19th century. But much environmental damage was caused to the valley itself at that time. The problems that Yosemite Park had under state control was one of the factors in establishing Yellowstone National Park as the first completely national park in 1872.

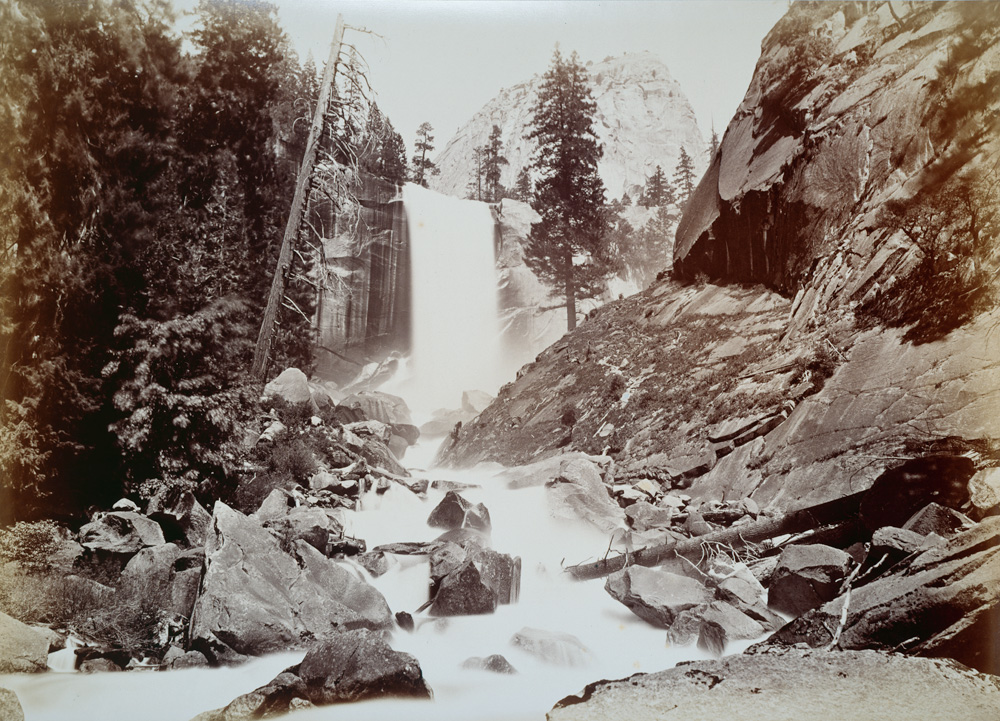
The Vernal Fall, Yosemite by Carleton Watkins c. 1873–83

Due to the difficulty of traveling there, early visitors to the valley came for several weeks to a couple of months, often as entire families with many possessions. Early hotels were therefore set up for extended stays and catered primarily to wealthy patrons who could spend extended periods away from home. One of these hotels—the Wawona Hotel, built in the 1880s—still operates.

After the Valley became a park, the surrounding territory was still subject to logging, mining, and grazing. John Muir publicized the damage to the subalpine meadows that surround the Valley and in 1890, the government created a national park that included a much larger territory—enclosing Yosemite Valley and Mariposa Grove.

=== 20th century ===
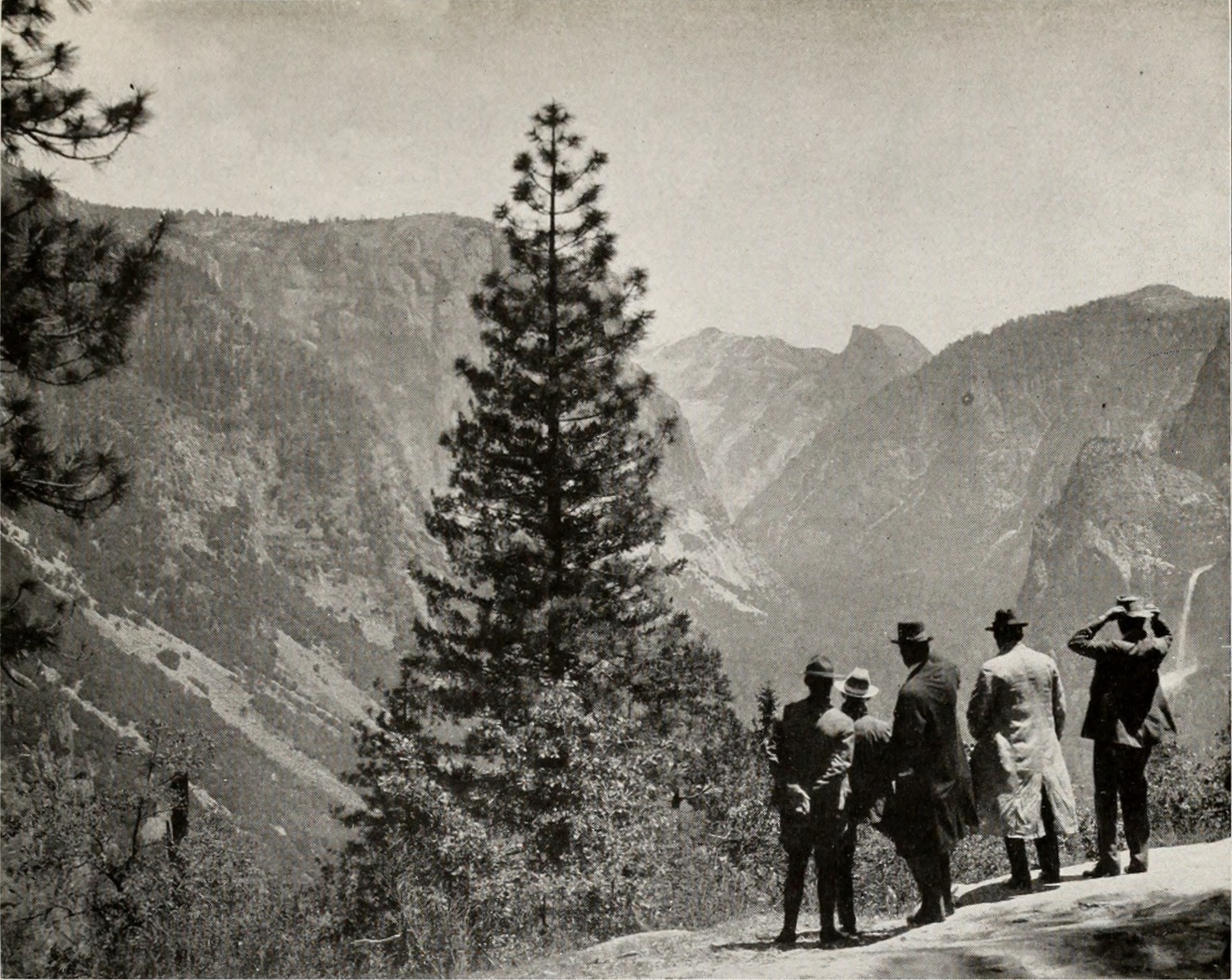
The Yosemite Valley from Inspiration Point, showing visitors gazing at Bridalveil Falls, 1921

As with Yellowstone, the new federal park was under U.S. Army jurisdiction until 1914. In 1906, the state ceded the Valley and Mariposa Grove to the federal government. The National Park Service, on its creation in 1916, took over Yosemite.

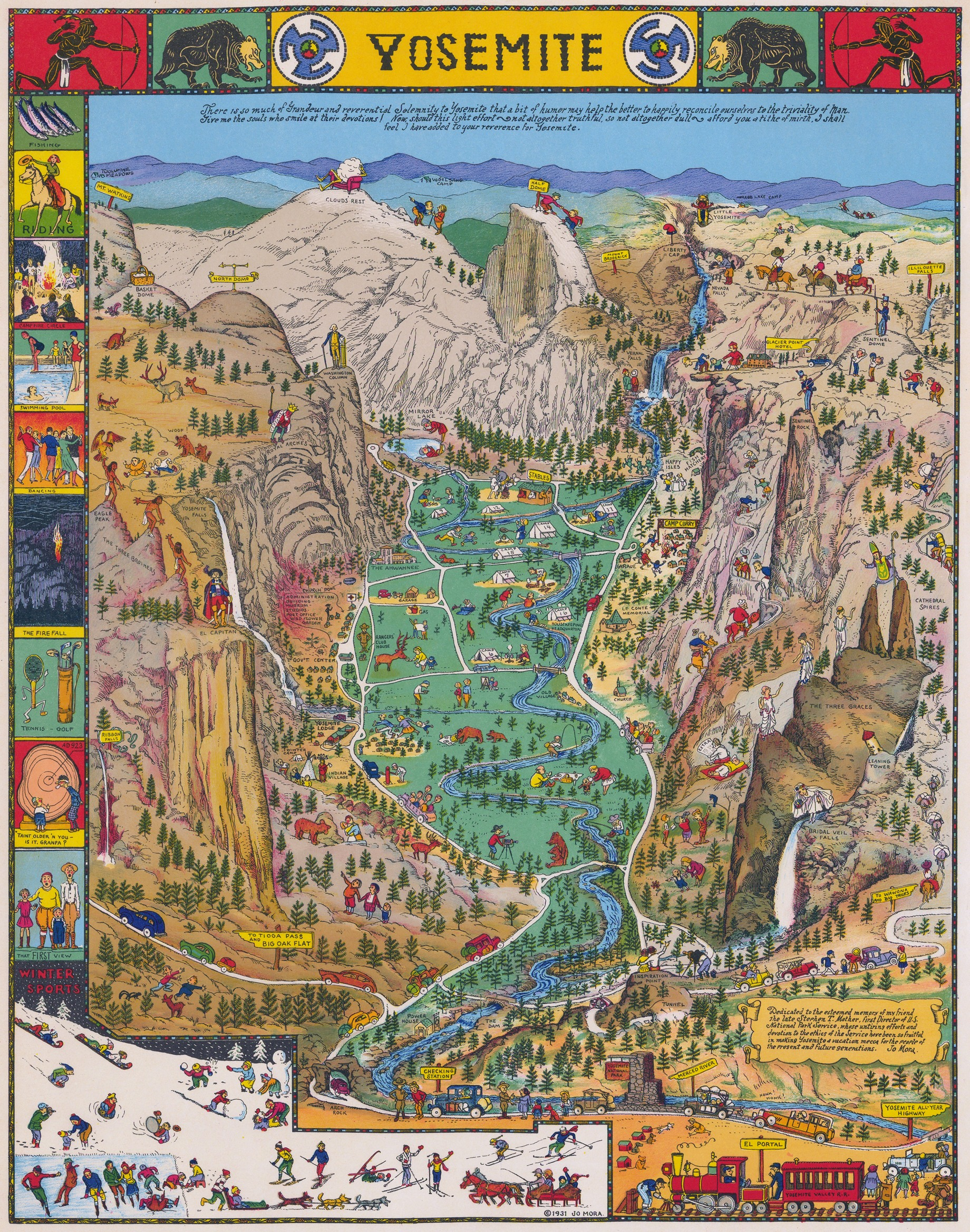
1931 pictorial map by Jo Mora

Yosemite Valley is listed as a National Historic District and as a California Historical Landmark. After the creation of the Park Service, many separate hotel owners held separate concession contracts. The Yosemite Park Company had built the Yosemite Lodge and Yosemite Village had its own group of merchants. Fire had destroyed a number of the original valley hotels and concession owners came and went until Park Service forced the two largest companies to merge in order that one single concession contract could be given. In 1925 the two family-run companies became the Yosemite Park and Curry Company and went on to build and run the Ahwahnee Hotel as the company headquarters for years, introducing a number of traditions, including the Bracebridge dinner.

Curry Village was the site from where villagers and visitors watched the Yosemite Firefall. This "fall" was large batches of red hot embers dropped from Glacier Point. The Park Service stopped this practice in 1969 as part of their long process of de-emphasizing artificial park attractions.

On July 6, 1996, a massive rock slide, weighing an estimated 60,000–80,000 tons, crashed 1,800 feet (550 m) into the valley from the east side of Glacier Point, traveling at over 160 mph (260 km/h). Dust blanketed that part of the valley for days, and the wind speed in front of the slide is estimated to have been 300 mph (480 km/h). One person was killed in the slide.

=== Merced River Plan ===
In 1987, Congress designated 122 miles of the Merced as a Wild and Scenic River. Yosemite National Park contains 81 of these miles, and the valley contains eight of those miles. This designation will "... preserve the Merced River in free-flowing condition and to protect the water quality and the outstandingly remarkable values (ORVs) that make the river worthy of designation".

In March 2014, the park system released the Merced Wild and Scenic River Comprehensive Management Plan/EIS to address the preservation of the river, safety, and to improve the visitor experience in the park. The plan will restore meadows and river bank areas and remove non-essential roads. Camping capacity will increase by 37%, and recreational services will be expanded. The plan calls for an 8% increase in parking for day use visitors to Yosemite Valley, including a new 300-car parking lot. The plan will allow the valley to accommodate a peak of 20,100 visitors per day.

The plan has been criticized for prioritizing park visitors over the preservation of the river and the valley. Some believe there should be further limitations to the number of cars and parking lots in the valley, and more focus on public transportation. On busy summer days, there can be long delays and traffic gridlock at the entrance to Yosemite.

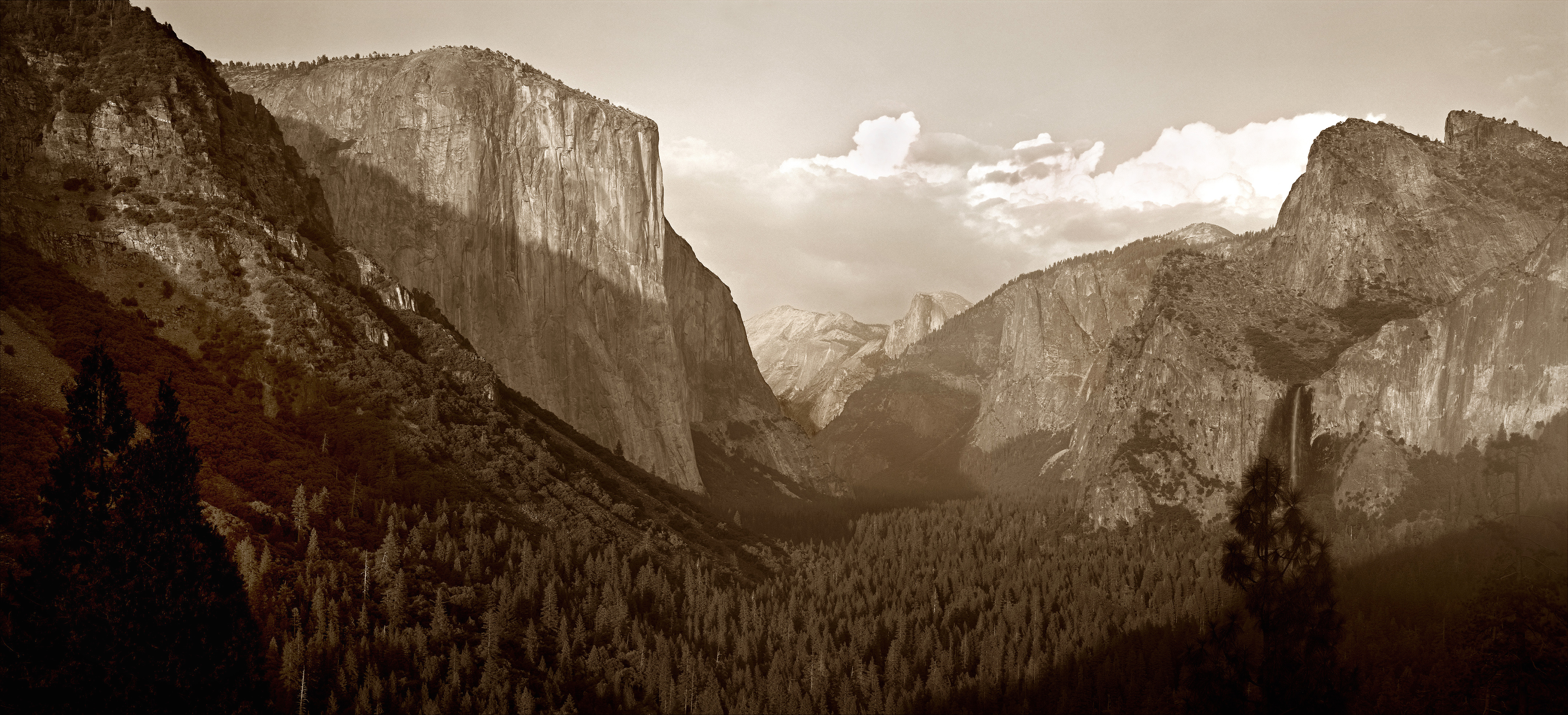
Yosemite Valley 1999

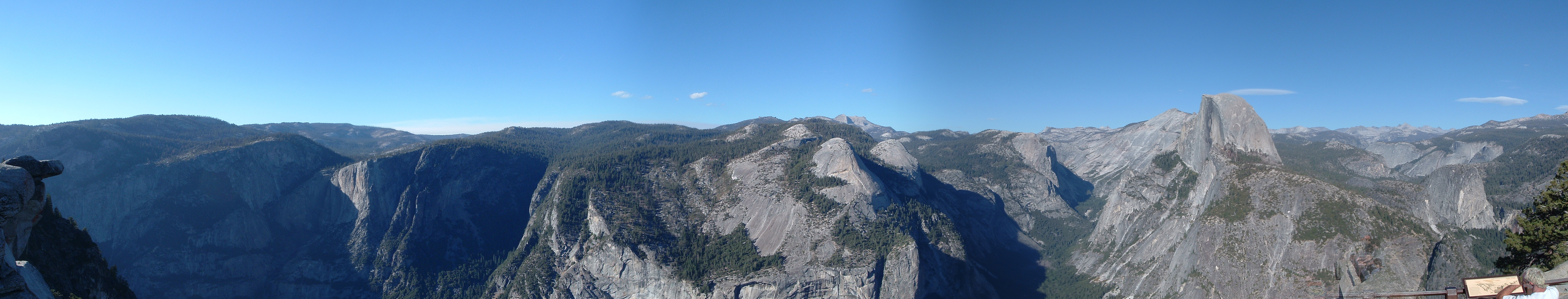
Panorama of Yosemite Valley including Half Dome as seen from Glacier Point

== See also ==
- Geology of the Yosemite area
- History of the Yosemite area
- Julia Parker (basketmaker)
- Yosemite West, California
