= List of waterfalls in California =

This is a list of waterfalls in California, ordered by county.

== Northern California ==
=== Alameda County ===
- Murrietta Falls – 100 ft (30 m)

=== Alpine County ===
- Llewellyn Falls – 25 ft (7.6 m)
- Wolf Creek Falls – 40 ft (12 m)

=== Amador County ===
- Moore Creek Falls

=== Calaveras County ===
- North Fork Stanislaus River Falls (Portage 24 Falls)

=== Butte County ===
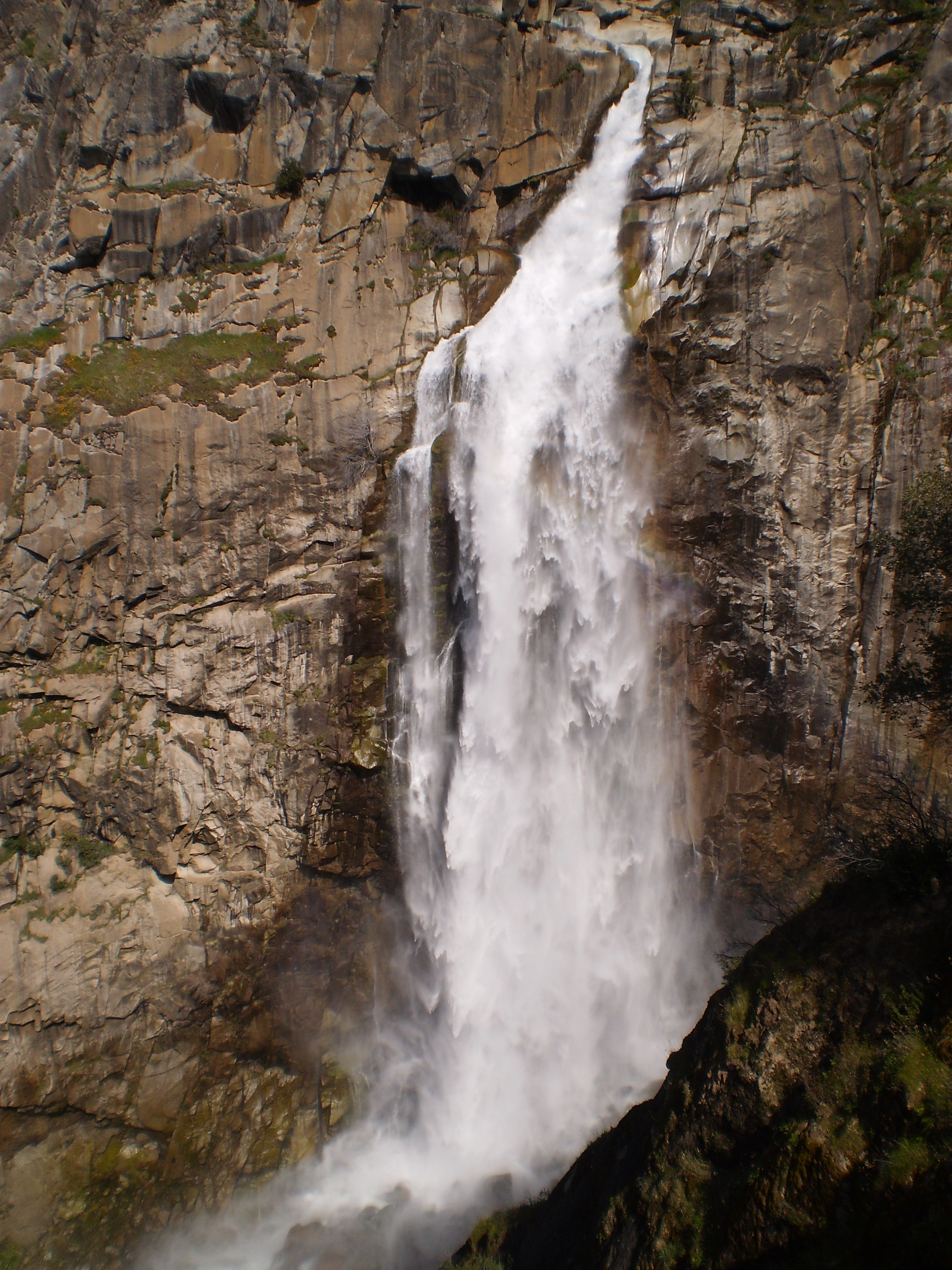
Feather Falls

- Phantom Falls (Coal Canyon Falls) – 164 ft (50 m)
- Feather Falls – 410 ft (120 m) +
- Frenchy's Falls

=== El Dorado County ===
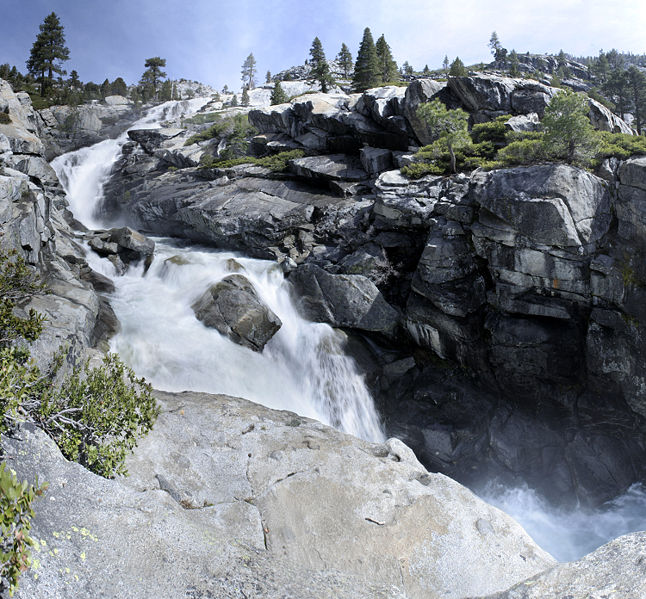
Horsetail Falls

- Bassi Falls – 109 ft (33 m)
- Bridal Veil Falls (Esmeralda Falls) – 81 ft (25 m)
- Eagle Falls – 160 ft (49 m)
- Glen Alpine Falls (Big Falls) – 73 ft (22 m)
- Horsetail Falls – 500 ft (150 m) +
- Modjeska Falls (Upper Glen Alpine Falls) – 51 ft (16 m)
- Pyramid Creek Cascades (Lower Horsetail Falls) – 75 ft (23 m)
- Traverse Creek Falls

Cascade falls missing

=== Humboldt County ===
- Baldwin Falls – 25 ft (7.6 m)
- Gold Dust Falls – 80 ft (24 m)

=== Lake County ===
- The "Jams" Rapid Falls 30 ft (9.1m)

=== Mendocino County ===
- Dora Falls – 30 ft (9.1 m)
- Chamberlain Creek Falls – 30 ft (9.1 m)
- Russian Gulch Falls – 36 ft (11 m)

=== Modoc County ===
- Mill Creek Falls – 50 ft (15 m) +

=== Napa County ===
- Zim Zim Falls – 105 ft (32 m)

=== Nevada County ===
- Bowman Lake Falls (Sawmill Falls, Canyon Creek Falls) – 80 ft (24 m)

=== Placer County ===
- Devils Falls – 65 ft (20 m)
- East Snow Mountain Falls – 2,200 ft (670 m) +
- Grouse Falls – 504 ft (154 m)
- Heath Falls – 65 ft (20 m) +
- Hidden Falls – 30 ft (9.1 m)
- New York Canyon Falls – 462 ft (141 m) +
- Petroglyph Falls – 80 ft (24 m)
- Wabena Falls – 65 ft (20 m)

=== Plumas County ===
- Chambers Creek Falls – 200 ft (61 m)
- Fern Falls – 35 ft (11 m)
- Frazier Falls – 178 ft (54 m)
- Halsey Falls (Hawlsey Falls) – 20 ft (6.1 m)
- Indian Falls – 15 ft (4.6 m)
- Little Jamieson Falls – 40 ft (12 m)

=== Shasta County ===
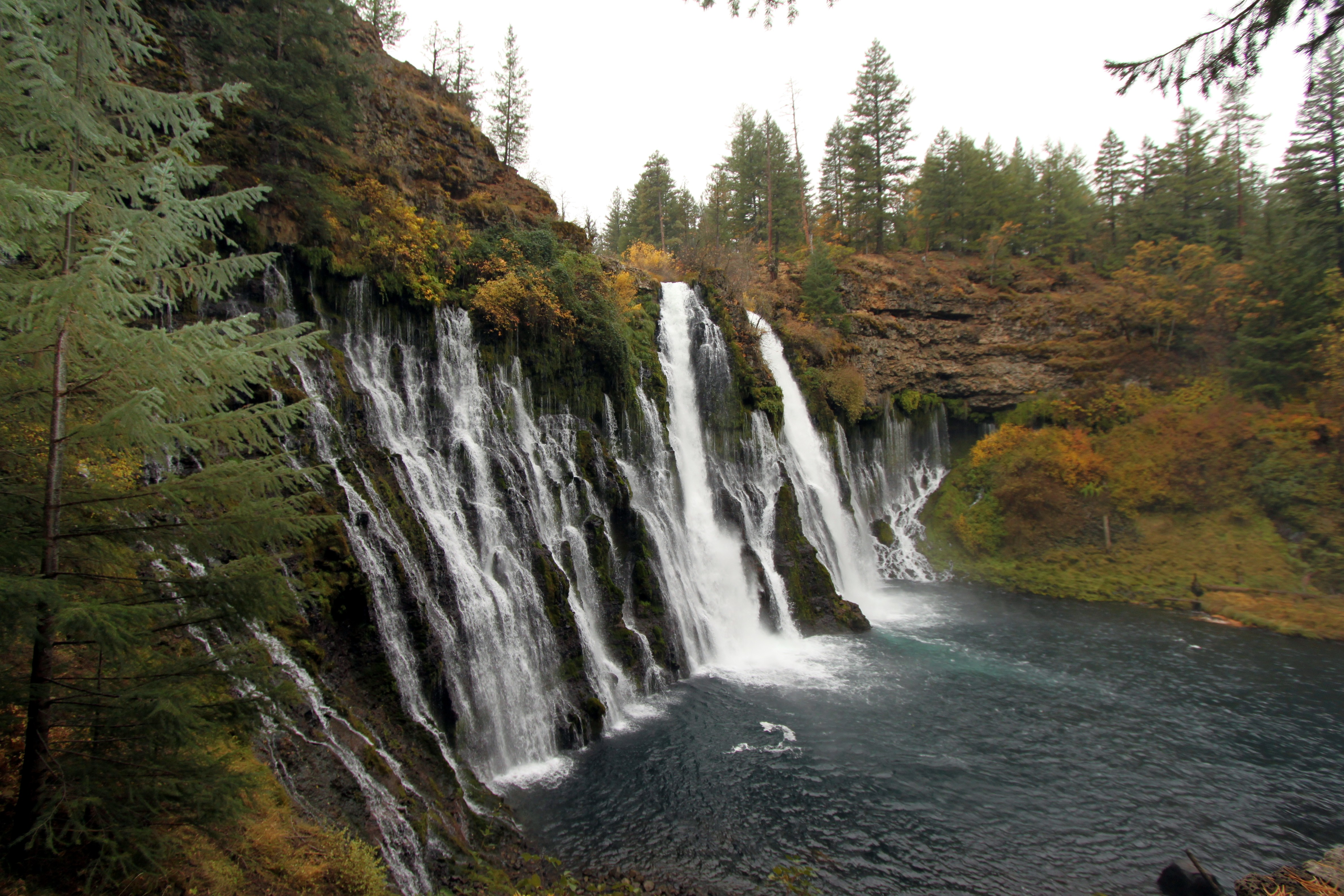
Burney Falls

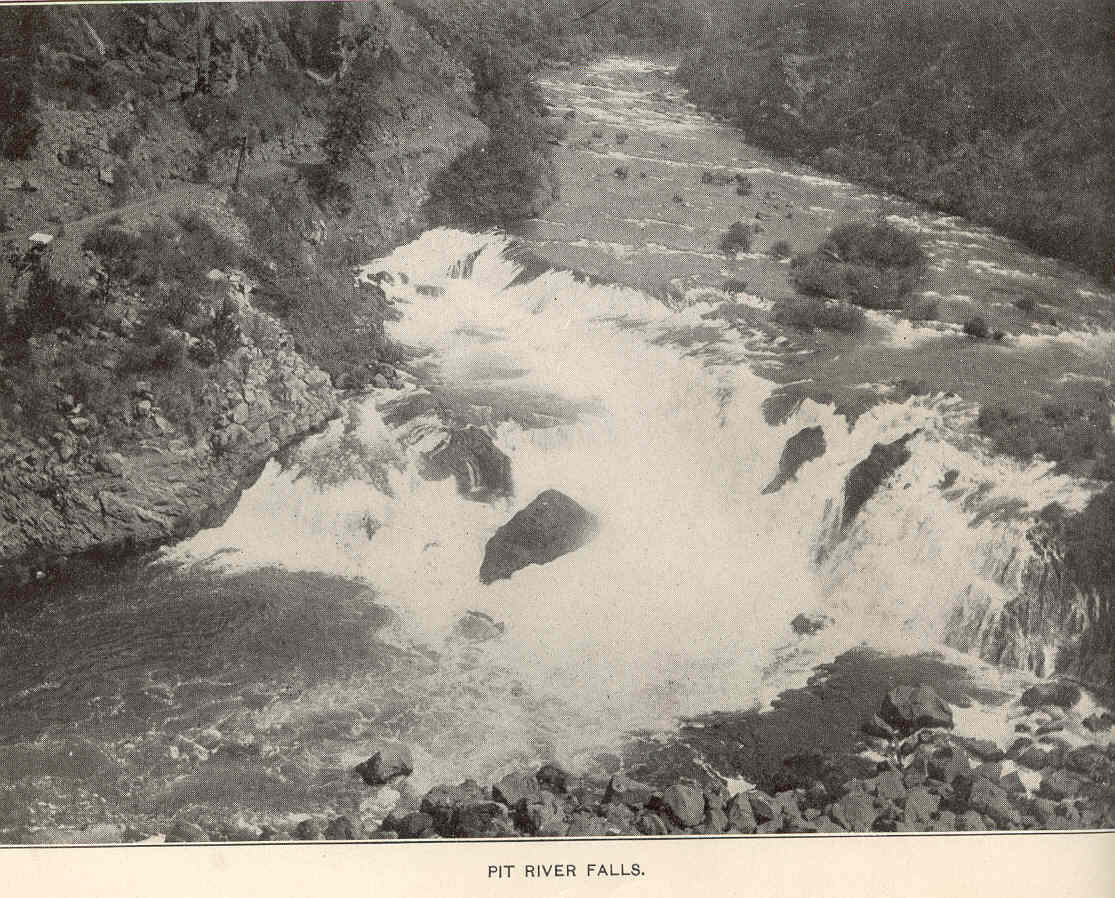
Pit River Falls

- Burney Falls – 129 ft (39 m)
- McCloud River Falls (Falls of the McCloud River) – 80 ft (24 m) +
- Kings Creek Falls – 46 ft (14 m)
- Pit River Falls – 50 ft (15 m)
- Potem Falls – 70 ft (21 m)
- The Cascades (Kings Creek) – 198 ft (60 m)
- Whiskeytown Falls – 180 ft (55 m) +

=== Siskiyou County ===
- Ash Creek Falls
- Coquette Falls
- Hedge Creek Falls – 30 ft (9.1 m)
- Ishi Pishi Falls
- Mossbrae Falls
- Mud Creek Falls (Konwakiton Falls)
- Whitney Falls – 200 ft (61 m)

=== Tehama County ===
- Battle Creek Falls – 16 ft (4.9 m)
- Bluff Falls – 47 ft (14 m)
- Deer Creek Falls – 18 ft (5.5 m)
- Mill Creek Falls – 75 ft (23 m)

== Central California ==
=== Contra Costa County ===
- Mount Diablo Falls

=== Fresno County ===
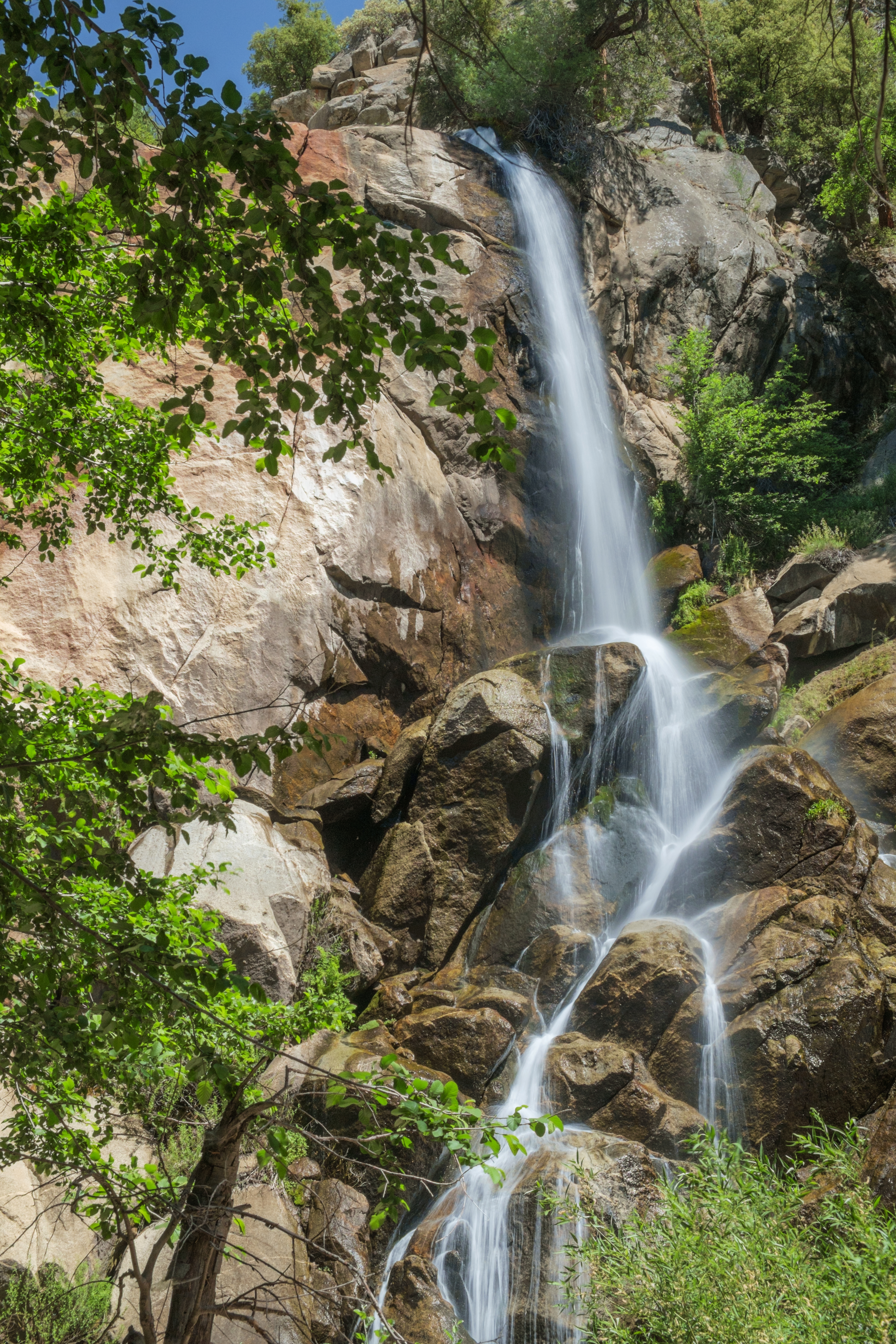
Grizzly Falls

- Big Creek Falls (Kerckhoff Cascade, The Cascada)
- Crystal Veil Falls
- Dinkey Creek Falls – 400 ft (120 m) +
- Garlic Falls – 820 ft (250 m)
- Grizzly Falls – 150 ft (46 m)
- Minnow Creek Falls – 250 ft (76 m)
- Mist Falls – 50 ft (15 m)
- Purple Lake Falls – 300 ft (91 m) +
- Redwood Creek Falls – 300 ft (91 m) +
- Roaring River Falls – 40 ft (12 m)
- Royce Falls (Royce Lake Falls) – 750 ft (230 m) +
- Silver Pass Falls – 475 ft (145 m)
- Silver Spray Falls – 200 ft (61 m) +
- Slissate Falls – 250 ft (76 m)
- Stevenson Creek Falls – 1,200 ft (370 m)
- Tenmile Creek Falls – 200 ft (61 m)
- Triple Falls – 550 ft (170 m)

=== Inyo County ===
- Darwin Falls – 80 ft (24 m)
- Portal Falls (Whitney Portal Falls, Lone Pine Creek Falls) – 150 ft (46 m) +

=== Madera County ===
- Angel Falls
- Camino Falls – 200 ft (61 m)
- Chiquito Creek Falls – 70 ft (21 m)
- Corlieu Falls – 80 ft (24 m)
- Jackass Falls – 160 ft (49 m)
- Nydiver Falls
- Rainbow Falls – 101 ft (31 m)
- Reconnaissance Creek Falls (37.4291727, -119.2599054) 900 ft (270 m)
- Hidden Falls – 40 ft (12 m)

=== Marin County ===
- Alamere Falls – 60 ft (18 m) +
- Cascade Falls
- Cataract Falls
- Dawn Falls – 30 ft (9.1 m)

=== Mariposa County ===
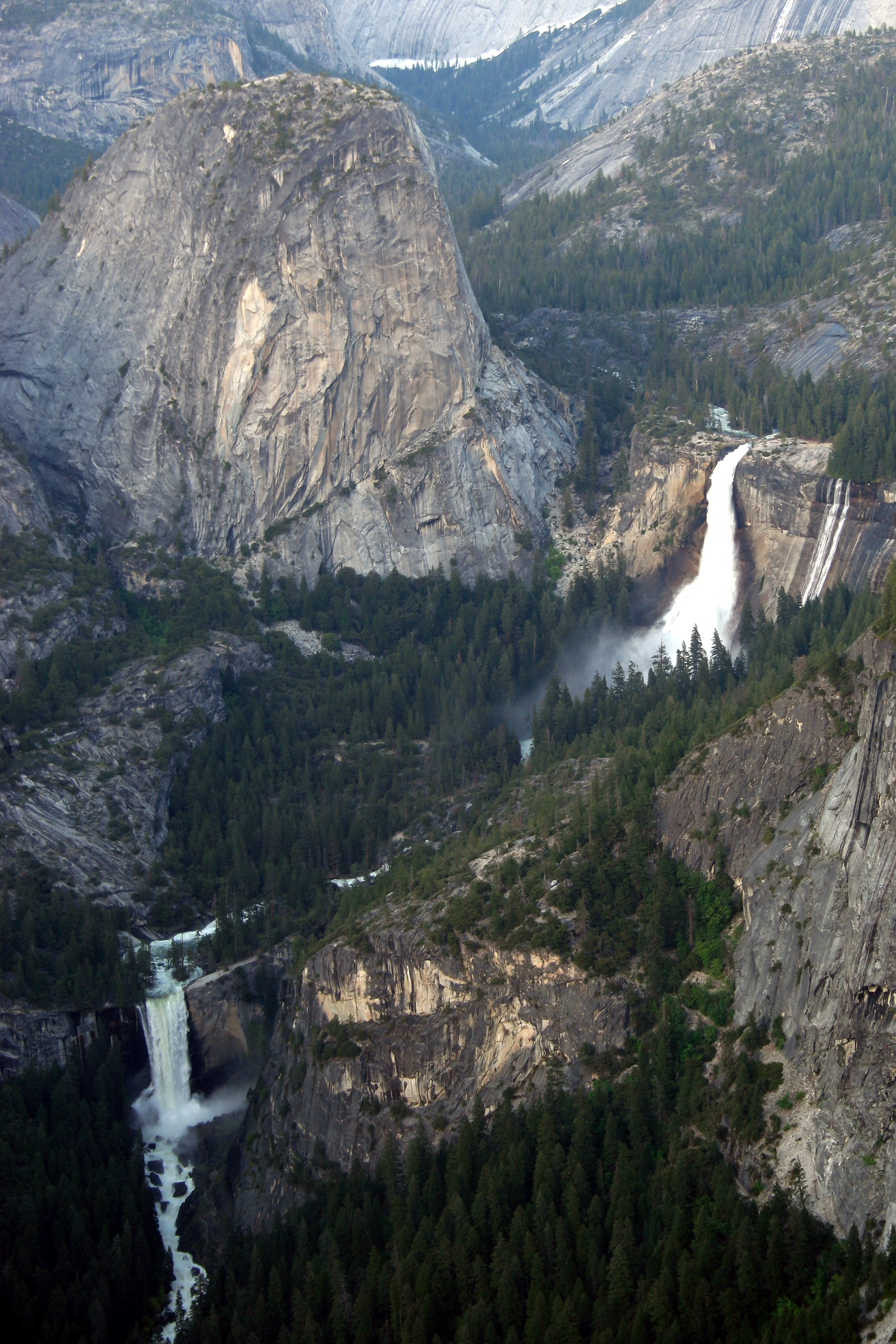
Vernal and Nevada Falls

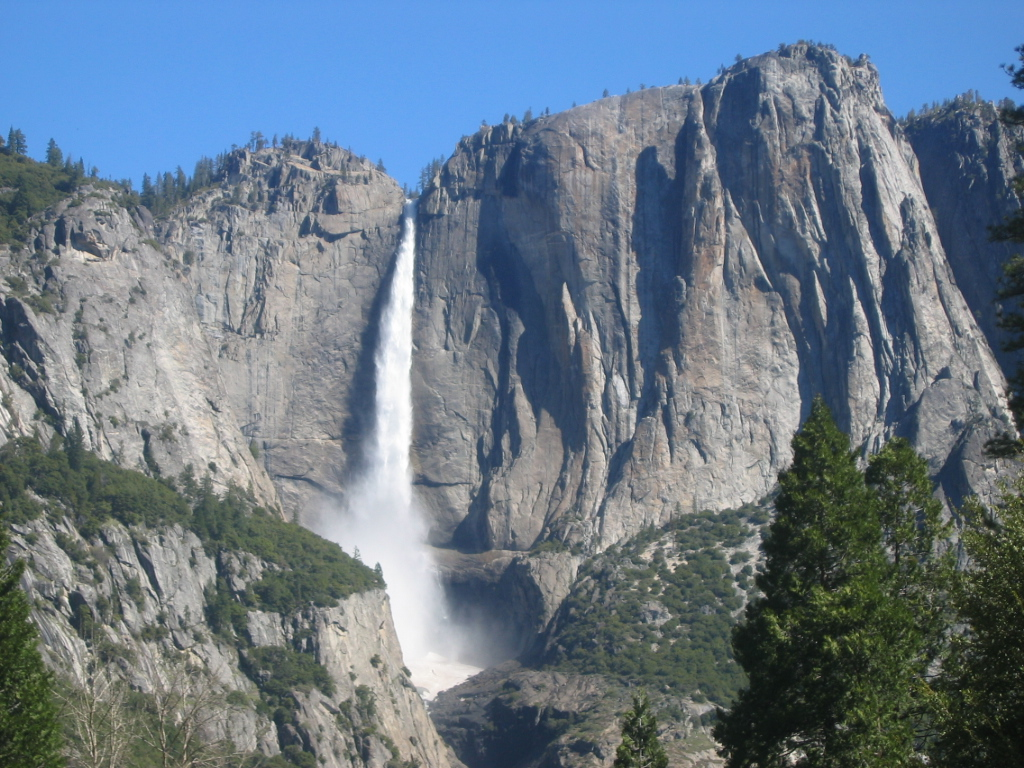
Upper Yosemite Fall

- Bridalveil Fall – 620 ft (190 m)
- Chain Cascade (Cascade Cliffs) – 1,150 ft (350 m)
- Chilnualna Falls – 690 ft (210 m)
- Fissure Falls – 400 ft (120 m) +
- Horsetail Fall – 2,130 ft (650 m)
- Illilouette Fall – 370 ft (110 m)
- Lehamite Falls – 1,180 ft (360 m)
- Nevada Fall – 594 ft (181 m)
- Pywiack Cascade – 600 ft (180 m)
- Quaking Aspen Falls – 25 ft (7.6 m)
- Ribbon Fall – 1,612 ft (491 m)
- Royal Arch Cascade – 1,250 ft (380 m)
- Sentinel Fall – 1,920 ft (590 m)
- Silver Strand Falls – 574 ft (175 m)
- Snow Creek Falls – 2,140 ft (650 m)
- Staircase Falls – 1,300 ft (400 m)
- The Cascades (Cascade Falls) – 750 ft (230 m)
- Three Chute Falls – 80 ft (24 m)
- Vernal Fall – 317 ft (97 m)
- Widow's Tears – (37.70554, -119.66552) 1,170 ft (360 m)
- Wildcat Falls – 720 ft (220 m)
- Yosemite Falls – 2,425 ft (739 m)

=== Mono County ===
- Aspen Falls
- Big Bend Falls – 15 ft (4.6 m)
- Ellery Lake Falls
- Gem Lake Falls
- Leavitt Falls – 200 ft (61 m)
- Lee Vining Falls
- Minaret Falls – 250 ft (76 m) +
- Rush Creek Falls (Horsetail Falls) – 200 ft (61 m) +
- Sardine Falls

=== Monterey County ===
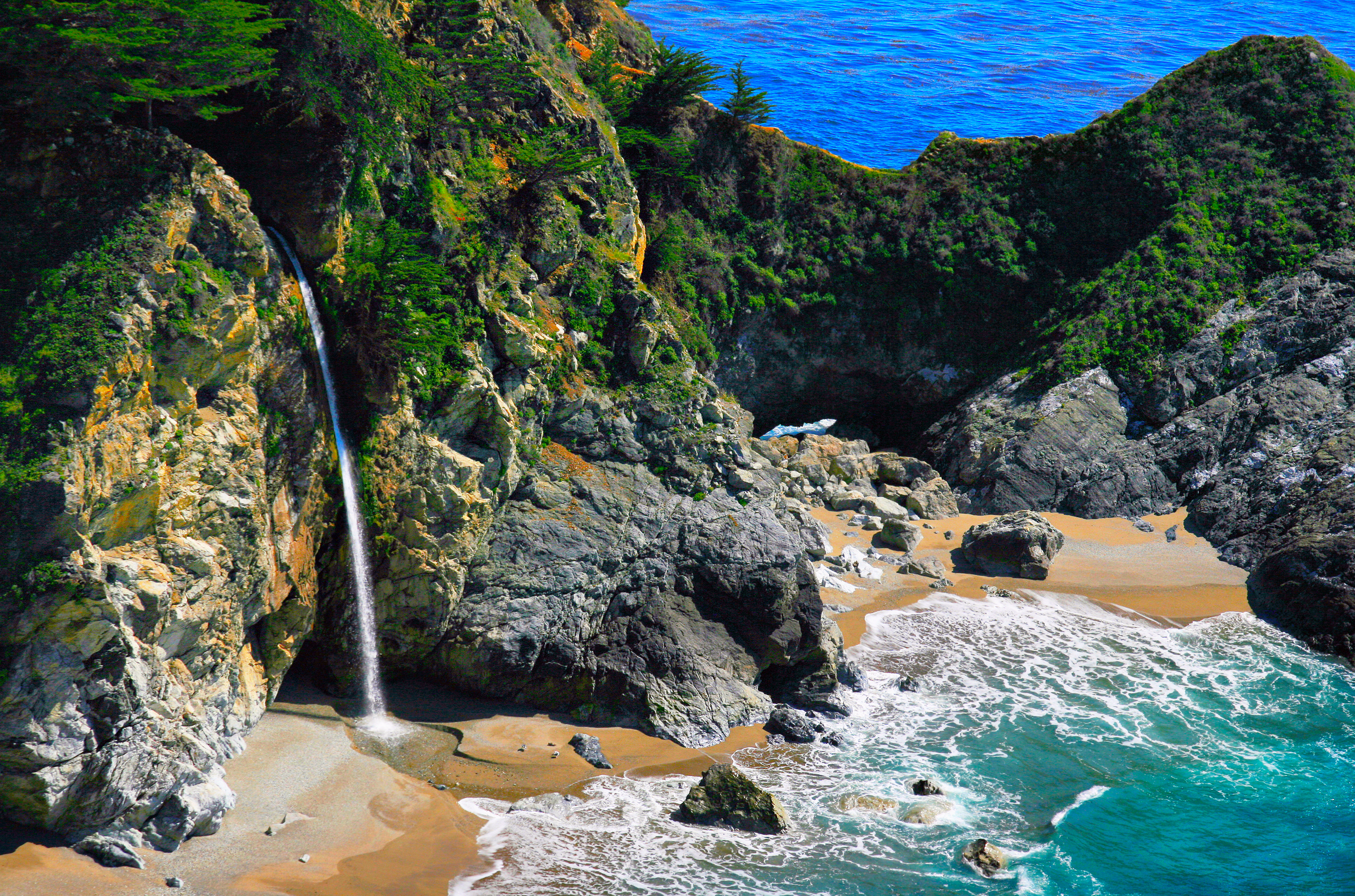
McWay Falls

- Limekiln Falls – 100 ft (30 m)
- McWay Falls – 80 ft (24 m)
- Salmon Creek Falls – 120 ft (37 m)

=== San Mateo County ===
- Elliot Creek Falls
- Peters Creek Falls
- Pomponio Falls – 30 ft (9.1 m)
- Tip Toe Falls – 6 ft (1.8 m)

=== Santa Clara County ===
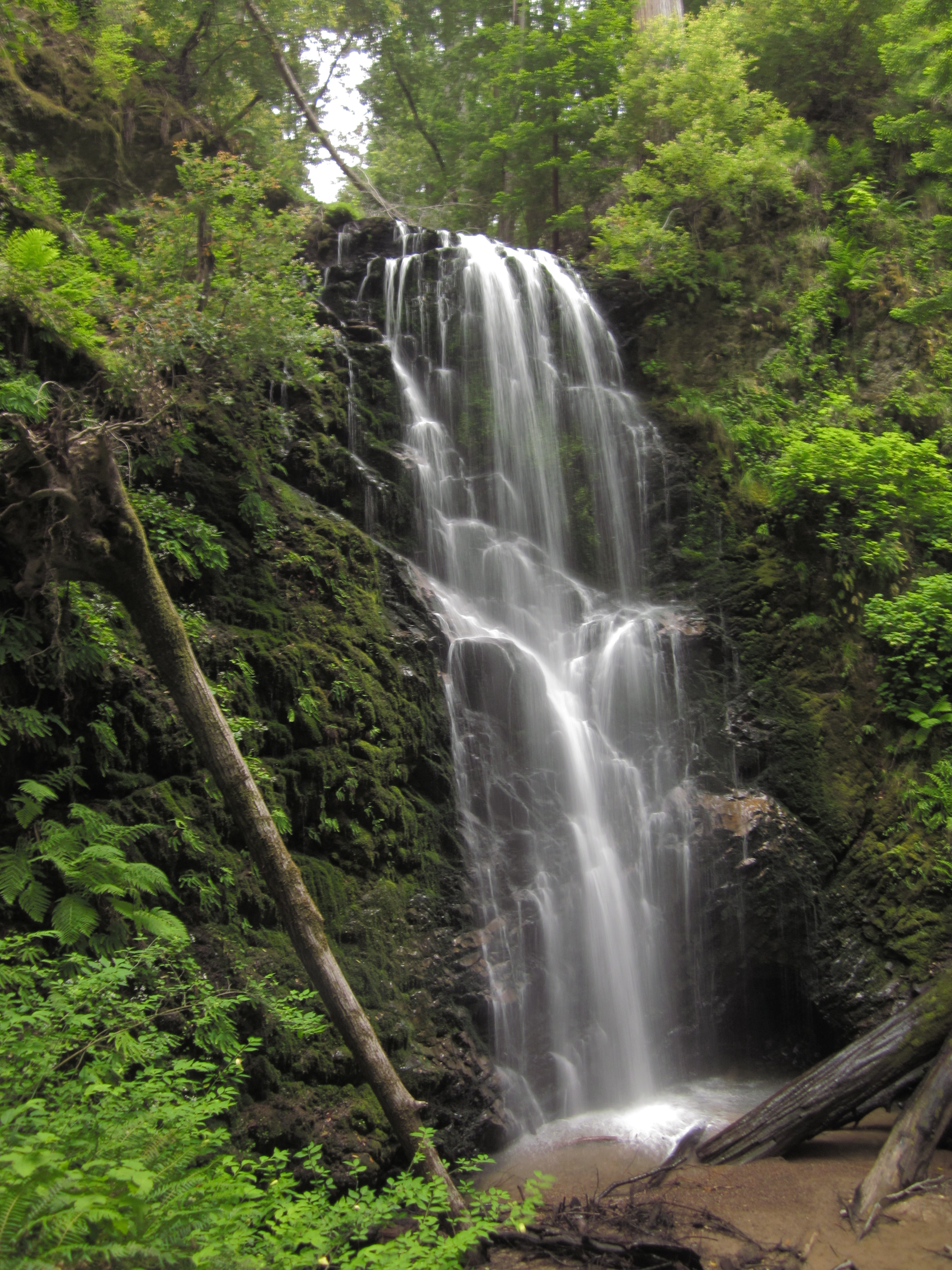
Berry Creek Falls

- Basin Falls – 20 ft (6.1 m)
- Black Rock Falls – 30 ft (9.1 m)
- Granuja Falls
- Triple Falls – 35 ft (11 m)
- Uvas Falls

=== Santa Cruz County ===
- Berry Creek Falls – 65 ft (20 m)
- Castle Rock Falls – 80 ft (24 m)
- Golden Cascade
- Silver Falls – 50 ft (15 m)

=== Tulare County ===
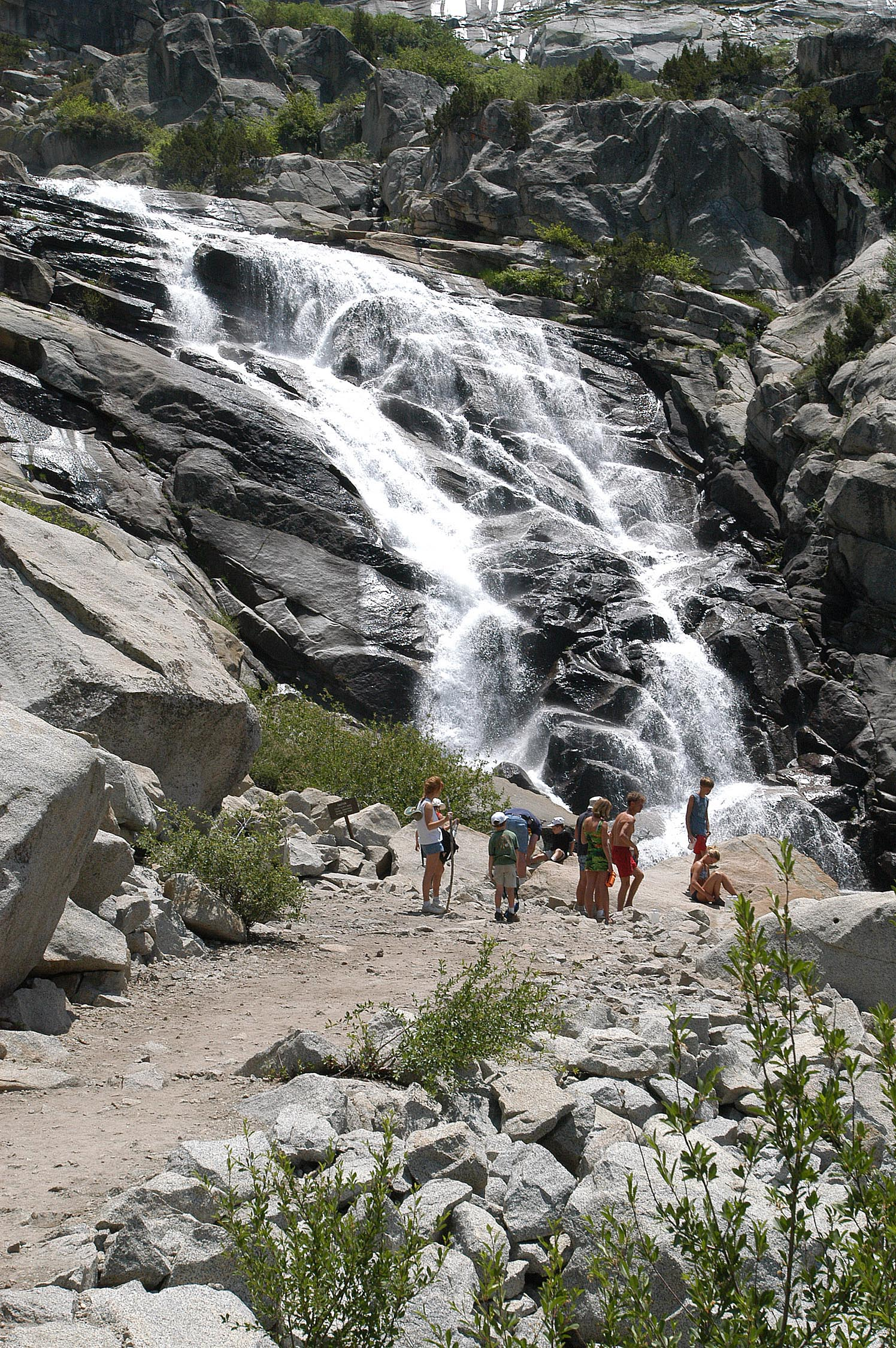
Tokopah Falls

- Black Wolf Falls – 50 ft (15 m)
- Broder Falls (Coyote Creek Falls) – 63 ft (19 m) +
- Brush Creek Falls
- Cascade Falls (Yucca Creek Falls) – 50 ft (15 m) +
- Chagoopa Falls – 1,200 ft (370 m)
- Crystal Creek Falls
- Franklin Falls
- Freeman Creek Falls – 150 ft (46 m)
- Marble Falls (Marble Fork Falls) – 600 ft (180 m)
- Middle Fork Tule River Falls – 50 ft (15 m)
- Panther Creek Falls
- Peppermint Creek Falls – 150 ft (46 m)
- Rock Creek Falls – 100 ft (30 m)
- Salmon Creek Falls – 450 ft (140 m) +
- South Creek Falls – 120 ft (37 m)
- South Fork Kaweah River Falls
- Sky Blue Lake Falls – 50 ft (15 m)
- Three-Falls-Below-The Gate (Mineral King Falls) – 200 ft (61 m)
- Tokopah Falls (Tokopah Valley Falls) – 1,200 ft (370 m)
- Tufa Falls – 450 ft (140 m) +
- Volcano Falls (Golden Trout Creek Falls)

=== Tuolumne County ===
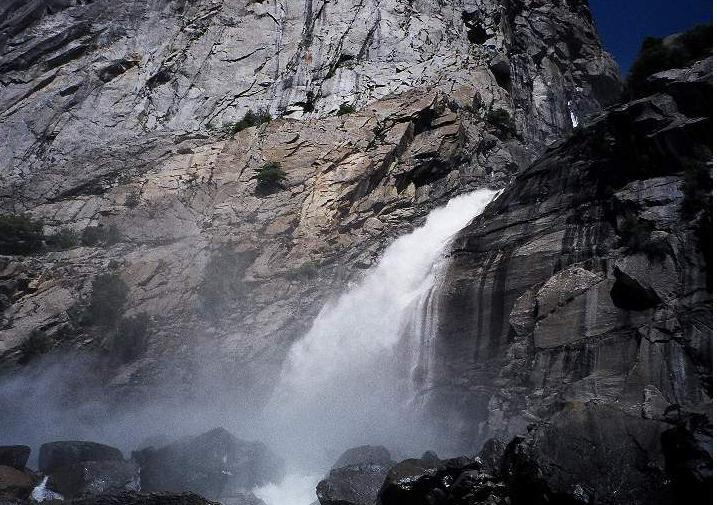
Wapama Falls

- California Falls – 120 ft (37 m)
- Clavey Falls
- Le Conte Falls – 250 ft (76 m)
- Niagara Creek Falls – 730 ft (220 m)
- Piute Falls
- Rancheria Falls
- Tueeulala Falls – 880 ft (270 m)
- Tuolumne Falls – 100 ft (30 m)
- Wapama Falls – 1,080 ft (330 m)
- Waterwheel Falls – 360 ft (110 m)
- White Cascade – (37.90817, -119.41939) 75 ft (23 m)

== Southern California ==
=== Kern County ===
- Spear Creek Falls (Poso Creek Falls)

=== Los Angeles County ===
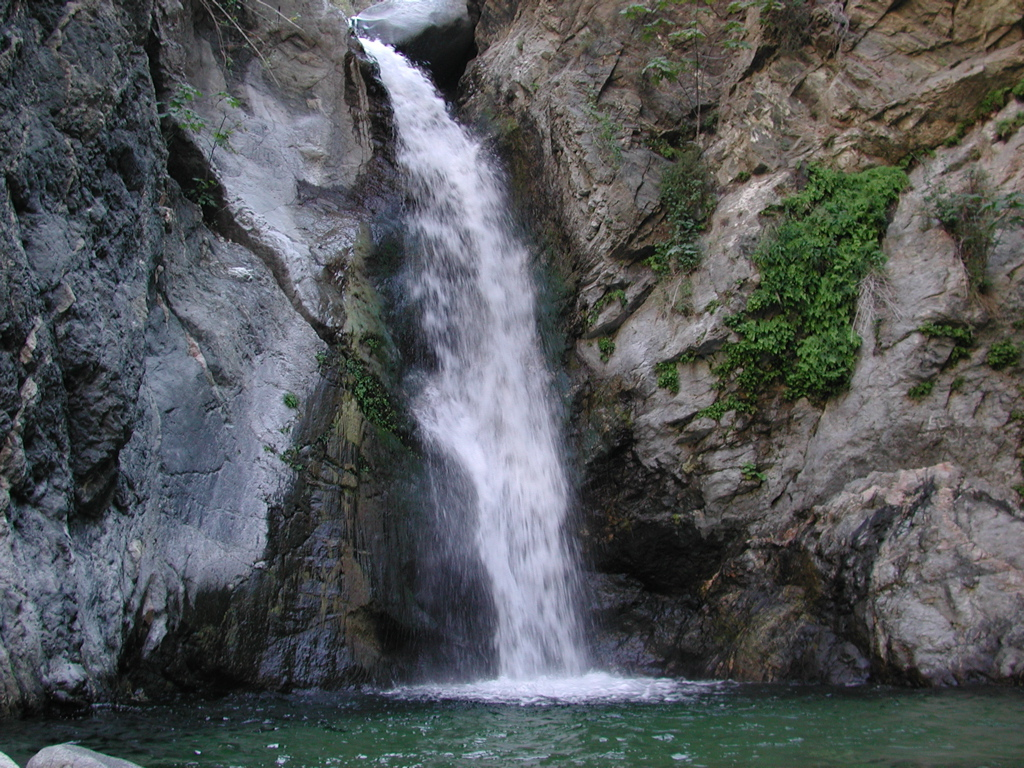
Eaton Canyon Falls

- Bailey Canyon Falls – 20 ft (6.1 m)
- Eaton Canyon Falls – 40 ft (12 m)
- Escondido Falls – 200 ft (61 m)
- Falls Creek Falls – 200 ft (61 m)
- Fish Canyon Falls – 80 ft (24 m)
- Fox Creek Falls – 60 ft (18 m)
- Grand Chasm Falls (Rainbow Falls)
- Hermit Falls – 20 ft (6.1 m)
- Leontine Falls
- Lodged Boulder Falls
- Maidenhair Falls
- Millard Canyon Falls – 60 ft (18 m)
- Moss Grotto Falls
- Newton Canyon Falls
- Ribbon Rock Falls
- Roaring Rift Falls
- San Antonio Falls – 75 ft (23 m)
- Saucer Branch Falls (Punch Bowl)
- Sturtevant Falls – 60 ft (18 m)
- Switzer Falls – 50 ft (15 m)
- Thalehaha Falls (Bridal Veil Falls) – 80 ft (24 m)
- Trail Canyon Falls – 50 ft (15 m)
- Wolfskill Falls – 100 ft (30 m)
- Zuma Canyon Falls – 30 ft (9.1 m)

=== Orange County ===
- Black Star Canyon Falls – 50 ft (15 m)
- Falls Canyon Falls – 30 ft (9.1 m)
- Holy Jim Falls – 15 ft (4.6 m)
- Laurel Canyon Falls – 100 ft (30 m)

=== Riverside County ===
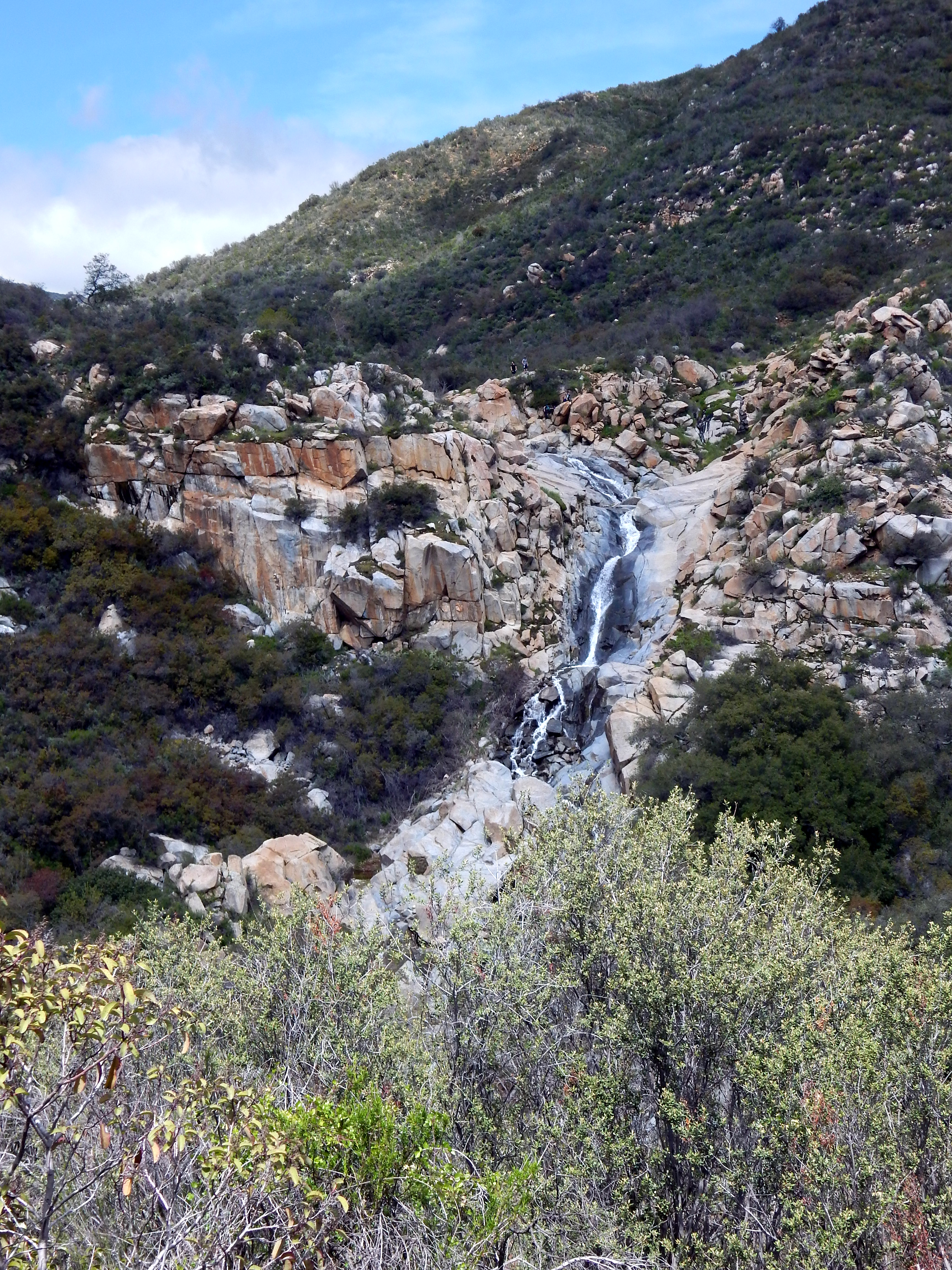
Tenaja Falls

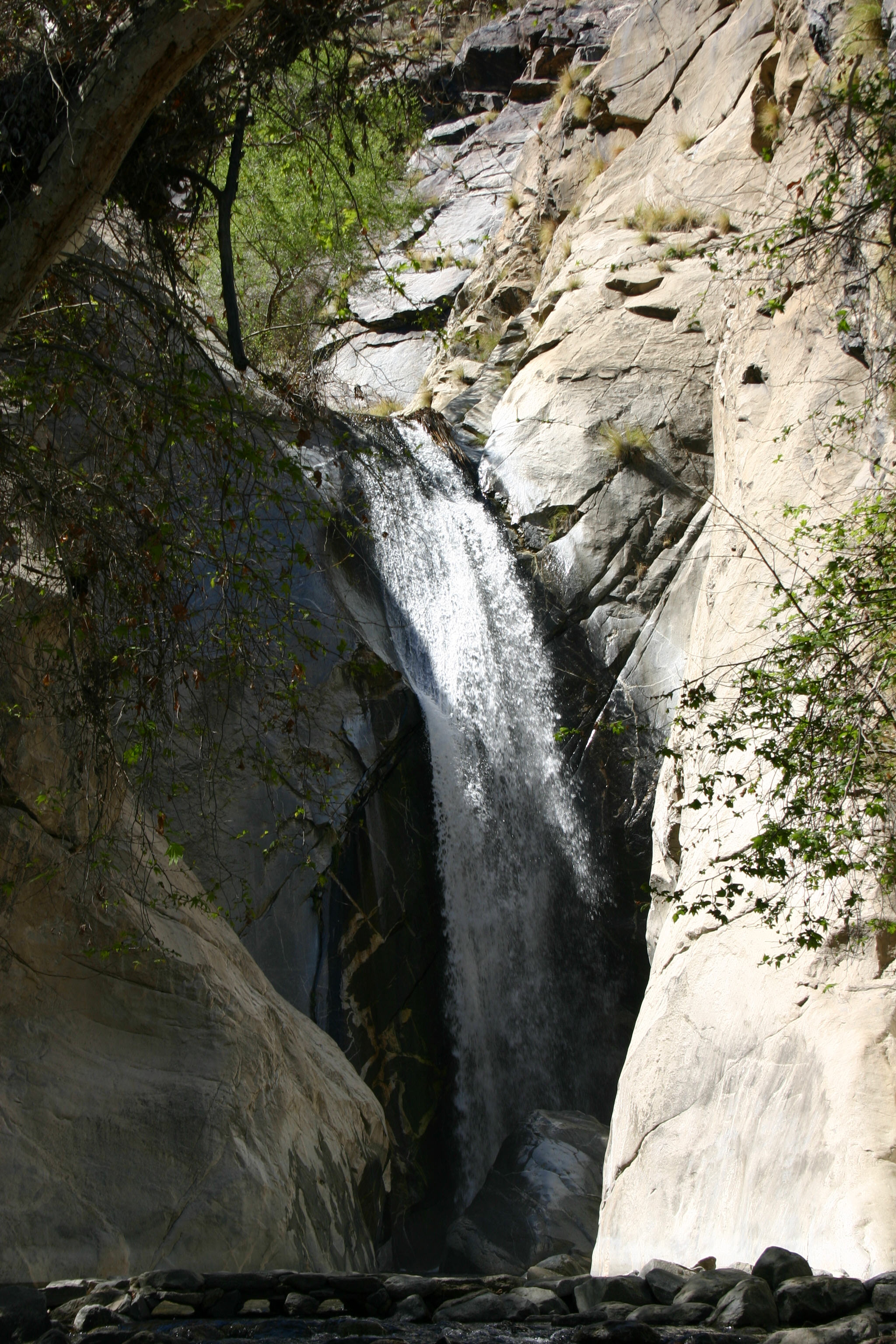
Tahquitz Falls

- Ortega Falls – 35 ft (11 m)
- San Juan Falls – 15 ft (4.6 m)
- Tahquitz Falls – 60 ft (18 m)
- Tenaja Falls – 150 ft (46 m)

=== San Bernardino County ===
- Big Falls – 500 ft (150 m)
- Bonita Falls (Bonita Canyon Falls) – 230 ft (70 m) +
- Etiwanda Falls – 15 ft (4.6 m)
- Frustration Creek Falls – 60 ft (18 m)
- Monkeyface Falls – 100 ft (30 m)
- Sapphire Falls

=== San Diego County ===
- Adobe Falls
- Cedar Creek Falls – 80 ft (24 m)
- Kitchen Creek Falls – 120 ft (37 m) +
- Three Sisters Falls (Devils Punchbowl) - 160 ft (49 m)
- Mildred Falls - 350 ft (110 m)
- Maidenhair Falls - 20 ft (6.1 m)

=== San Luis Obispo County ===
- Big Falls – 135 ft (41 m) +
- Nacimiento Falls – 20 ft (6.1 m)

=== Santa Barbara County ===
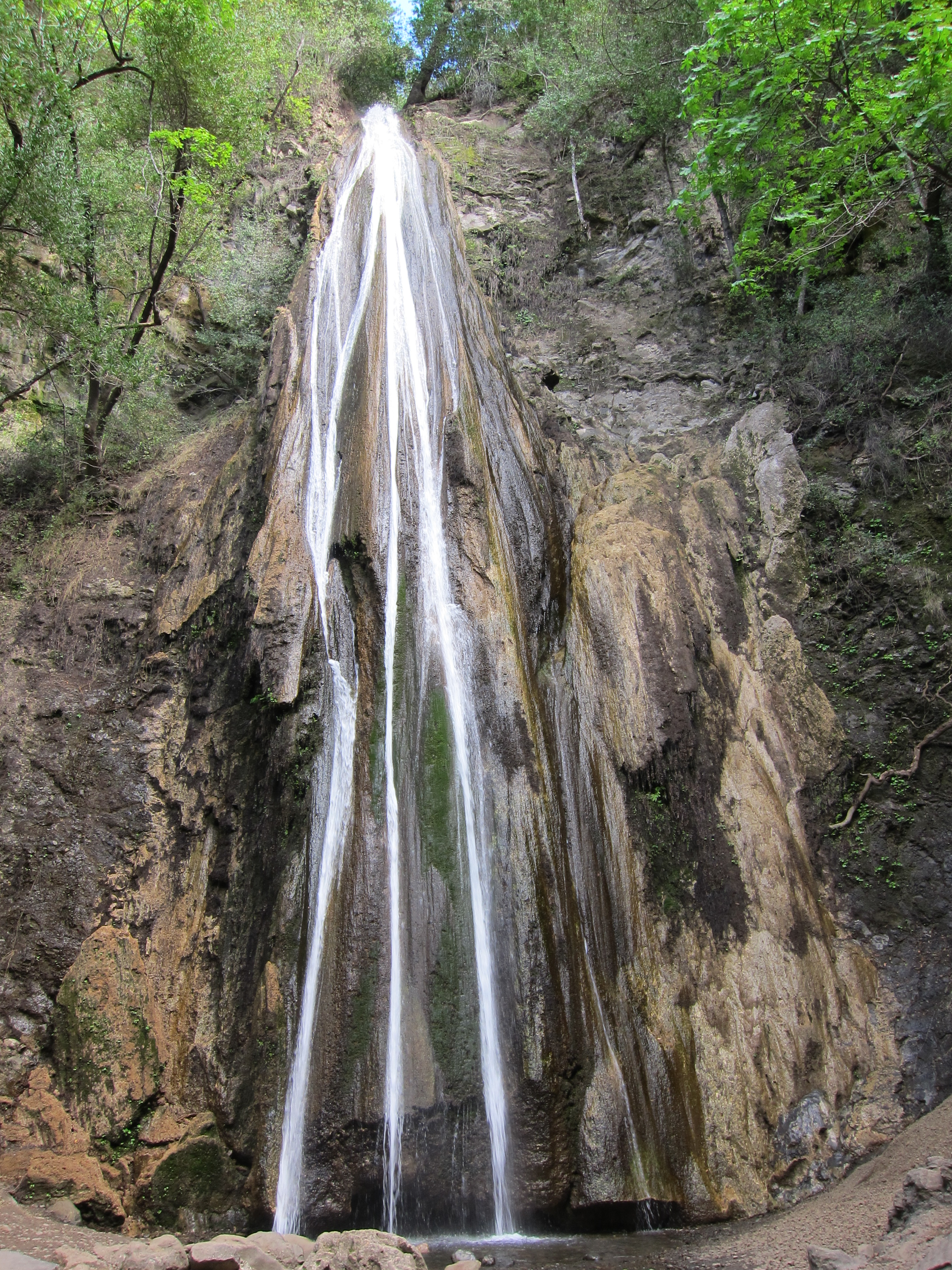
Nojoqui Falls

- Mission Falls
- Nojoqui Falls – 80 ft (24 m)
- Rattlesnake Falls
- San Ysidro Falls
- Seven Falls
- Sisquoc Falls – 250 ft (76 m)
- Tangerine Falls (West Fork Cold Springs Falls) – 100 ft (30 m)

=== Ventura County ===
- La Jolla Canyon Falls – 15 ft (4.6 m)
- Matilija Falls – 40 ft (12 m) +
- Paradise Falls (Wildwood Falls) – 70 ft (21 m)
- Piru Creek Falls – 15 ft (4.6 m)
- Rose Valley Falls – 300 ft (91 m)
- Santa Paula Canyon Falls (The Punchbowl) – 30 ft (9.1 m)
- Santa Ynez Falls
- Solstice Canyon Falls – 25 ft (7.6 m)
- Tar Creek Falls (Emerald Falls) – 70 ft (21 m) +

== Tallest waterfalls ==
Tallest waterfalls in California
Rank	Name	Height	Location
1	Yosemite Falls	2,425 ft (739 m)	Yosemite National Park
2	East Snow Mountain Falls	2,200 ft (670 m)	Eldorado National Forest
3	Sentinel Fall	1,920 ft (590 m)	Yosemite National Park
4	Widow's Tears	1,680 ft (510 m)	Yosemite National Park
5	Ribbon Fall	1,612 ft (491 m)	Yosemite National Park
6=	Horsetail Fall	1,400 ft (430 m)	Yosemite National Park
6=	Columbia Cascade	1,400 ft (430 m)	Yosemite National Park
8	Wapama Falls	1,310 ft (400 m)	Yosemite National Park
9	Staircase Falls	1,300 ft (400 m)	Yosemite National Park
10	Royal Arch Cascade	1,250 ft (380 m)	Yosemite National Park
11=	Tokopah Falls	1,200 ft (370 m)	Sequoia National Park
11=	Chagoopa Falls	1,200 ft (370 m)	Sequoia National Park
11=	Stevenson Creek Falls	1,200 ft (370 m)	Sierra National Forest
14	Lehamite Falls	1,180 ft (360 m)	Yosemite National Park
15	Chain Cascade (Cascade Cliffs)	1,150 ft (350 m)	Yosemite National Park
16	Reconnaissance Creek Falls	900 ft (270 m)	Sierra National Forest
17	Tueeulala Falls	880 ft (270 m)	Yosemite National Park
18	Garlic Falls	800 ft (240 m)	Sierra National Forest
19	Horsetail Falls	791 ft (241 m)	Eldorado National Forest
20	The Cascades (Cascade Falls)	750 ft (230 m)	Yosemite National Park

== See also ==
- List of waterfalls
- List of waterfalls of the United States
