= Uvas =

Uvas may refer to:

== Places ==
- Las Uvas, Panama
- Llagas-Uvas, California, United States
- Rancho Las Uvas, California, United States
- Sierra de las Uvas, New Mexico, United States
- Uvas Creek, California, United States
- Uvas Falls, California, United States
- Uvas Reservoir Reservoir, artificial lake located west of San Martin, California in the United States

== Other ==
- University of Veterinary and Animal Sciences
