= Ribbon Fall =

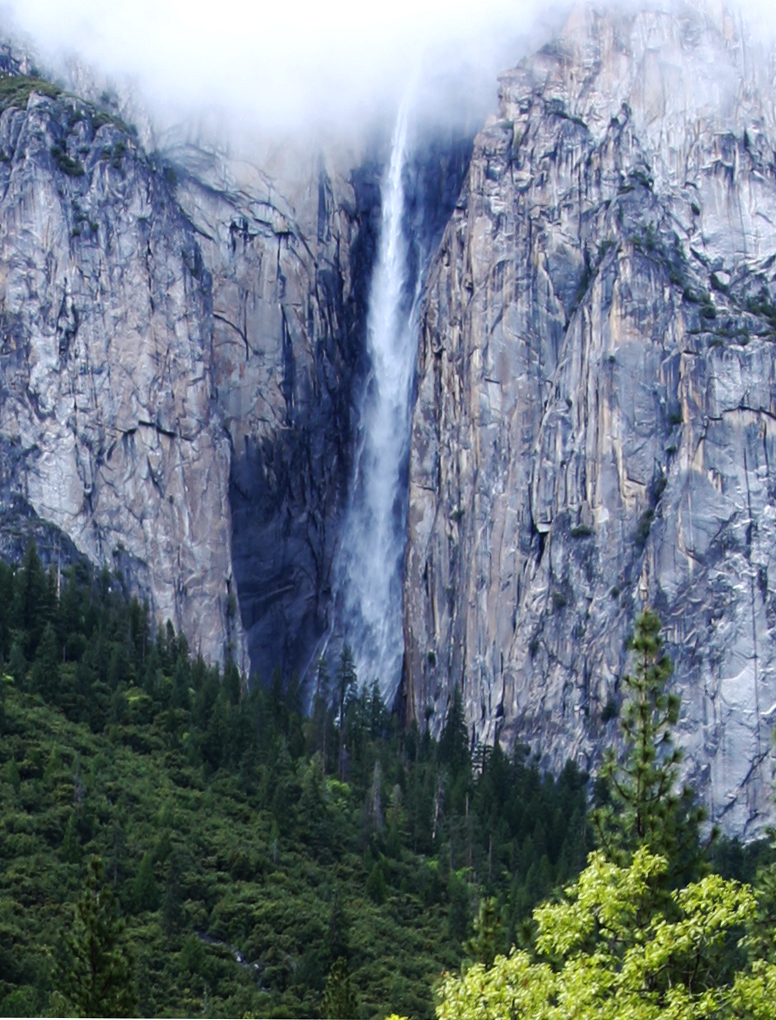
- Interactive map of Ribbon Fall
- Location: Yosemite National Park, Mariposa County, California, United States
- Coordinates: 37°44′09″N 119°38′54″W
- Type: Plunge
- Total height: 1,612 ft (491 m)
- Number of drops: 1
- World height ranking: 99

Ribbon Fall, located in Yosemite National Park in California, flows off a cliff on the west side of El Capitan and is the longest single-drop waterfall in North America. The fall is fed by melting winter snow and the peak amount of water flow is during the months of May to June; while therefore dry for much of the year, the fall is a spectacular 1,612 feet (491 m) in the spring. In exceptional years, an ice cone develops at its base during the winter months similar to that which usually forms beneath Upper Yosemite Fall. This deposit can reach a depth of 200 feet, versus 322 feet for the greatest depth of the ice cone beneath the Upper Fall and Lower Fall.

== Etymology ==
The Native American name for the waterfall was “Lung-yo to-co-ya,” which translates to “pigeon basket or nest,” likely referring to the band-tailed pigeons that inhabited the area. James Hutchings, however, translated the name as “long and slender” and renamed it “Ribbon Fall.” Lafayette Bunnell disagreed with Hutchings' interpretation and instead referred to it as “Pigeon Creek Fall.”

The waterfall has also been called “Virgin’s Tears,” a name reportedly coined by a sentimental woman in the 1860s, inspired by its brief seasonal flow, which she likened to the fleeting tears of a maiden.

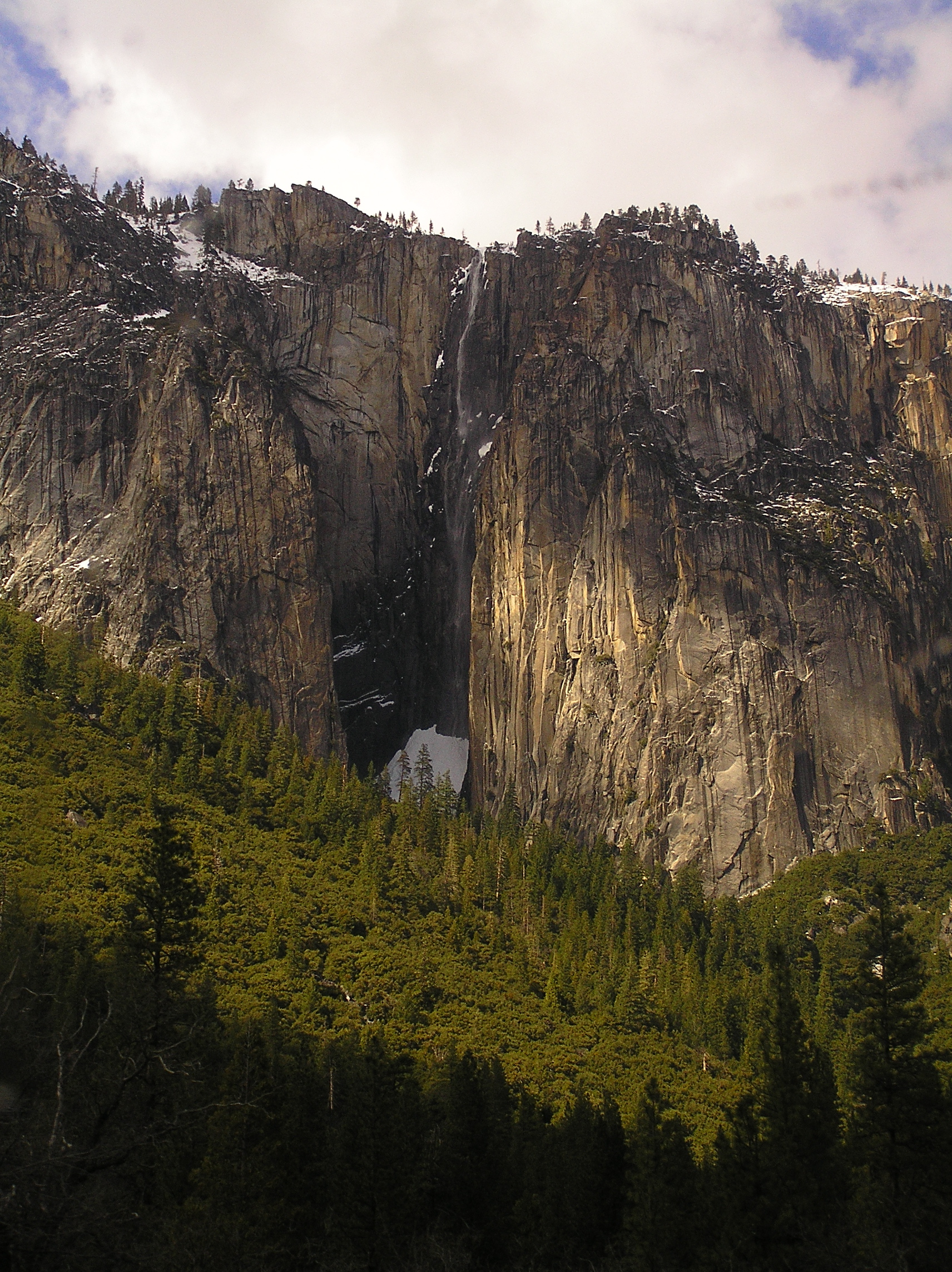
Ribbon Fall in Yosemite National Park

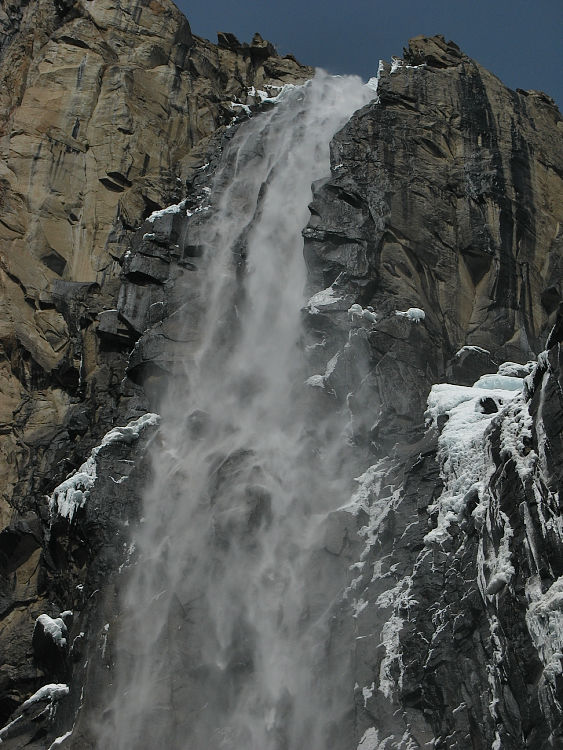
The top of Ribbon Fall.

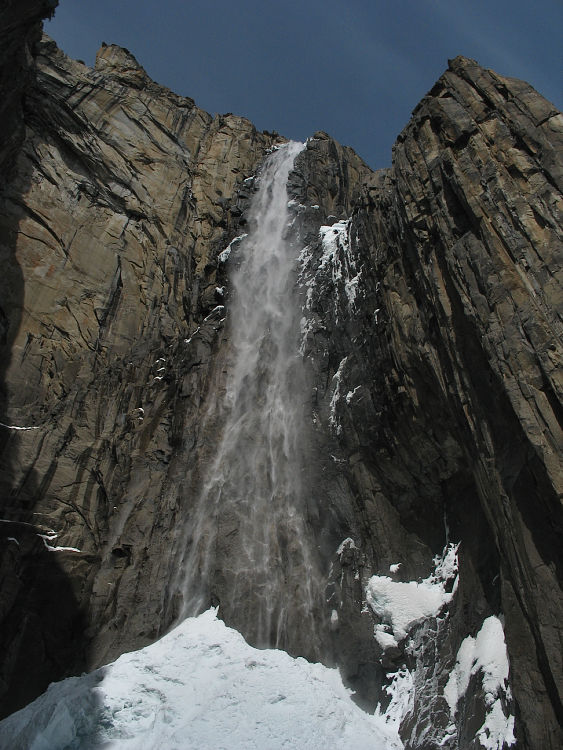
Ribbon Fall as seen from its base. Note the ice cone.

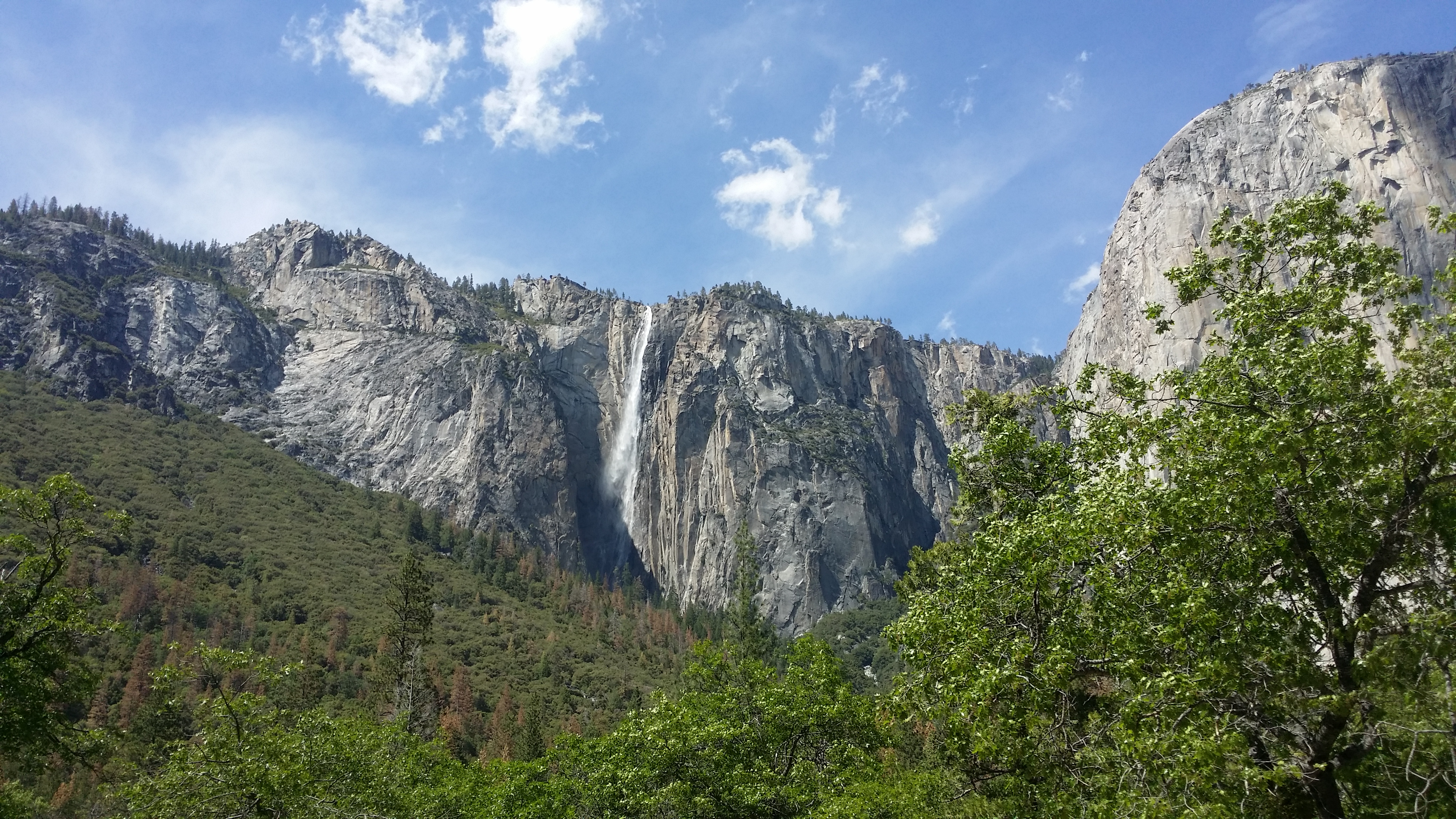

== See also ==
- List of waterfalls
- List of waterfalls in California
