= Leavitt Falls =

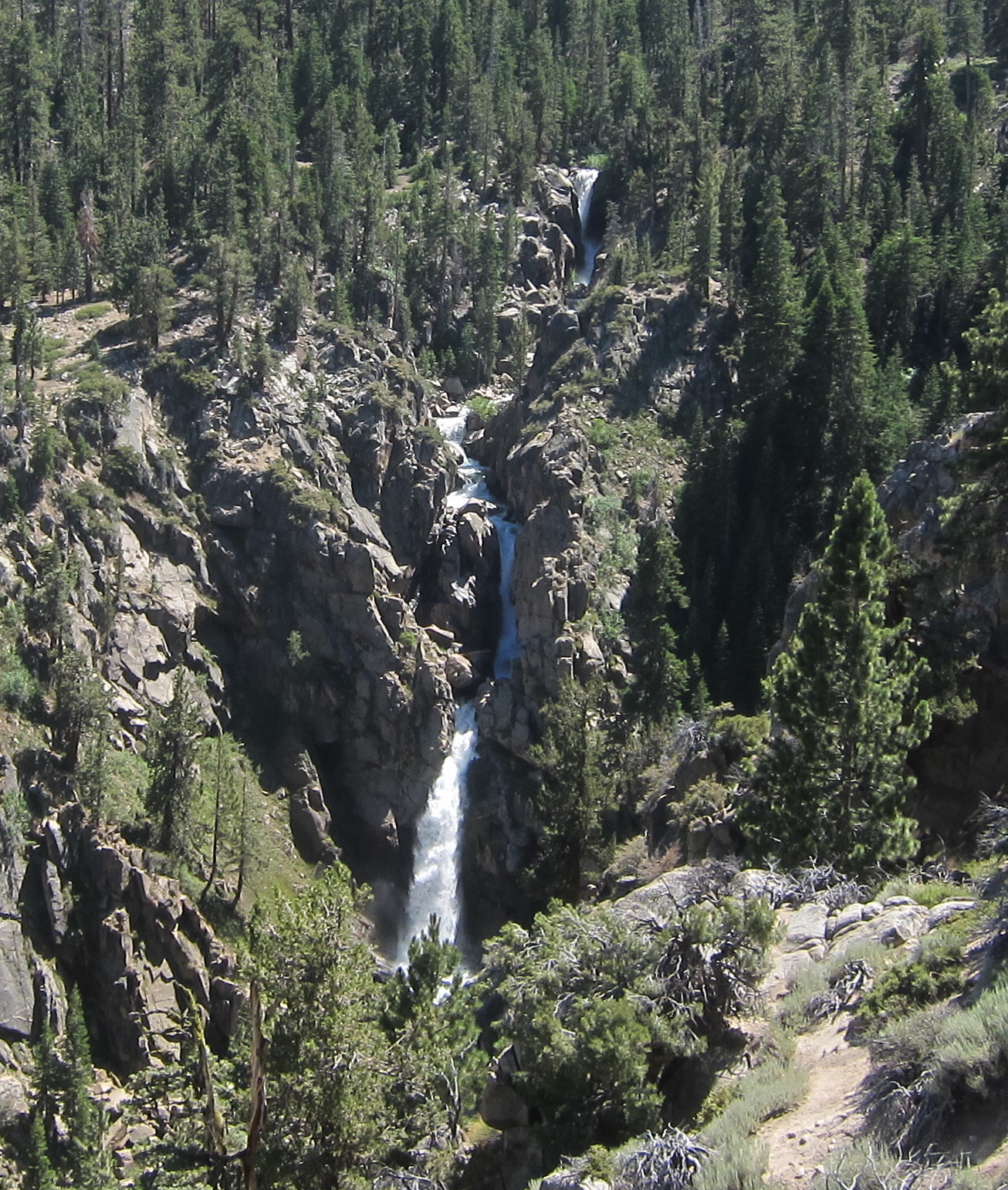

- Location within California
- Location: Mono County, California
- Coordinates: 38°19′09″N 119°33′47″W
- Type: Tiered
- Elevation: 7,769 ft (2,368 m)
- Total height: 200 ft (61 m)
- Number of drops: 4
- Longest drop: 70 ft (21 m)
- Watercourse: Leavitt Creek

Leavitt Falls is a 200-foot (61 m), multi-tiered waterfall in the Sierra Nevada of Mono County, California. The falls are located on Leavitt Creek, a tributary of the West Walker River and are formed where the creek drops off the edge of a hanging valley into Leavitt Meadow.

A turnout on Highway 108 provides a view of the falls and meadow. The falls themselves are not accessible by trail, as they are located in a steep narrow box canyon. The waterfall and other nearby features are named for Hiram Leavitt, an early settler in Mono County.

== See also ==
- List of waterfalls
- List of waterfalls of California
