= Horsetail Falls (California) =

Waterfall in the Sierra Nevada

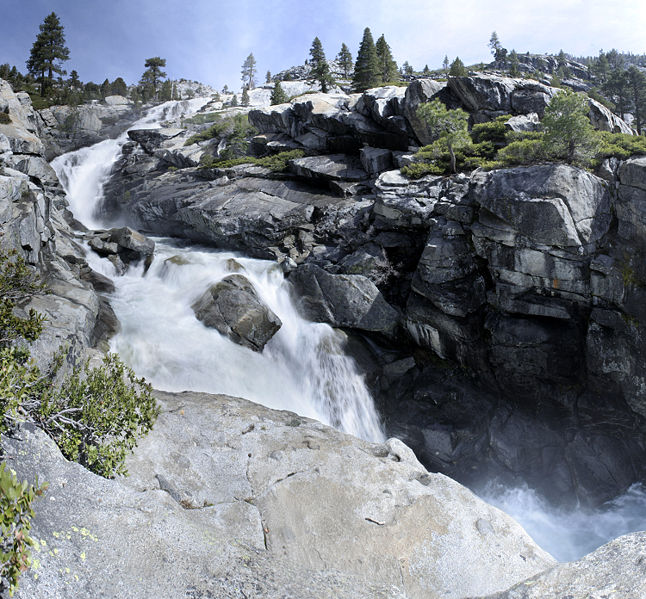
Horsetail Falls (California)

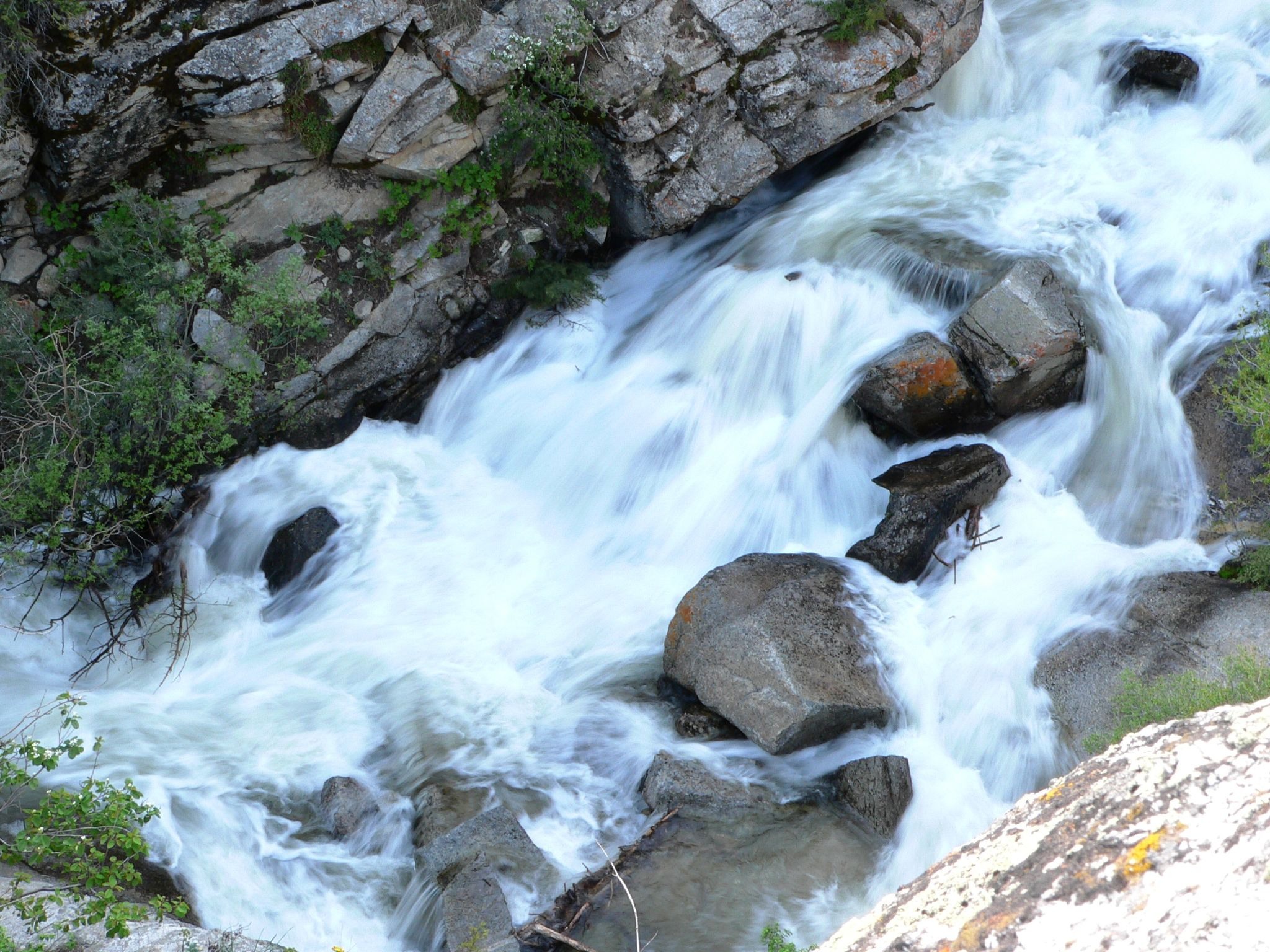
Stream above initial fall, at Horsetail Falls

Horsetail Falls is a waterfall in the Sierra Nevada mountain range, to the west of Lake Tahoe in the Desolation Wilderness of El Dorado County, California, United States. It falls in stages for 791 feet (241 m). It can be reached by hiking north out of the Twin Bridges trailhead on U.S. Route 50. There is a forest service parking area designated to the area.

It is located at 38°49′40.28″N 120°7′23.87″W.

== See also ==
- List of waterfalls
- List of waterfalls in California
