= Tueeulala Falls =

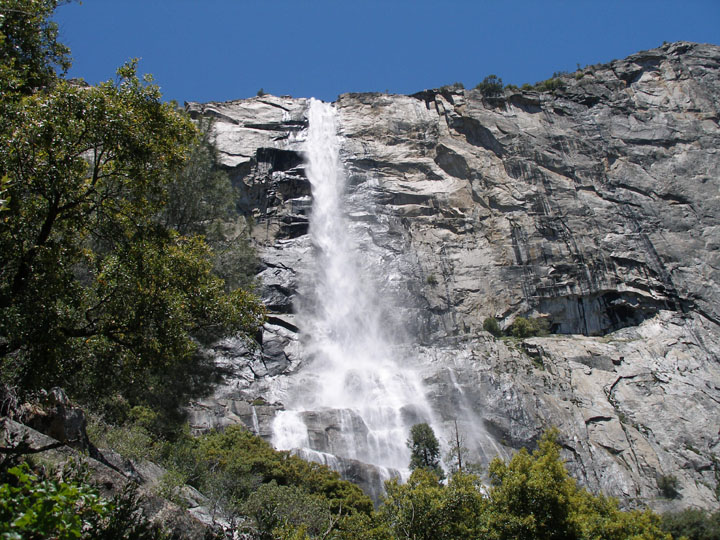
- Interactive map of Tueeulala Falls
- Location: Hetch Hetchy Valley, Yosemite National Park, Tuolumne County, California, United States
- Coordinates: 37°57′51″N 119°46′22″W.
- Type: Plunge
- Total height: 880 ft (270 m)
- Number of drops: 2
- Longest drop: 600 ft (180 m)
- Watercourse: Falls Creek
- World height ranking: 312

Tueeulala Falls is located on the north side of Hetch Hetchy Valley in Yosemite National Park. At roughly 880 feet it is the smaller of two large waterfalls that spill into Hetch Hetchy Reservoir, the other being Wapama Falls. It is, however, the larger of the two in terms of greatest free-fall distance, as Wapama is split into two falls. Tueeulala Fall drops free for 600 feet, hits a ledge, then slides steeply down 280 feet further. The hike to the top of the falls is off trail but fairly brush free and straightforward.

The waterfall is highly seasonal and is one of the most irregular waterfalls in the park. This is due to it being located on a seasonal distributary of Falls Creek, the primary channel of which flows over Wapama Falls, that only flows during spring snowmelt when water from the creek rises sufficiently high. This can turn Tueeulala Falls into one of the most powerful waterfalls in the park during certain times, however it can also lose flow faster than any other waterfall in Yosemite.

== See also ==
- List of waterfalls
- List of waterfalls in California
