= Silver Strand Falls =

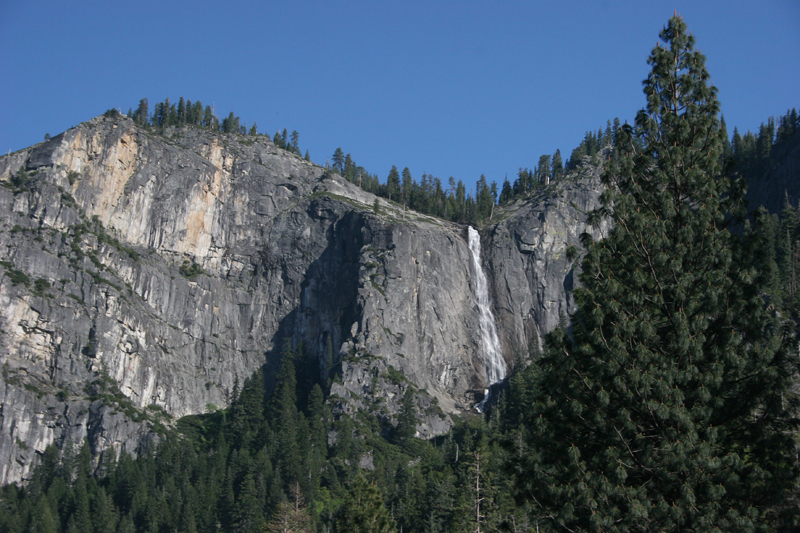
- Silver Strand Falls in May, from Inspiration Point
- Interactive map of Silver Strand Falls
- Location: Yosemite Valley, Yosemite NP, CA, US
- Coordinates: 37°42′16″N 119°40′09″W
- Type: Horsetail
- Total height: 574 feet (175 m)

Silver Strand Falls drops 574 feet (175m) along Meadow Brook, at the western end of Yosemite Valley, within Yosemite National Park. The falls are commonly thought to drop 1170 feet (356m); this is incorrect. The name Widow's Tears had been applied to Silver Strand Falls in the past, but the lower-volume waterfall located one drainage to the east of Meadow Brook is now known as Widow's Tears and is thought to drop 1,170 feet (360 m), hence the confusion regarding the height.

Note that the recent 1:24,000 topo map of Yosemite Valley shows the height of this waterfall as 400 feet (120 m), not 574 feet (175 m), which is derived, apparently, from ice climbers. Since the waterfall is not vertical, it is possible that the ice-climbing height is, in fact, 574 feet (175 m), while the difference in elevation between the top and bottom is as shown on the topo sheet at 400 feet (120 m).

The origin of the number "1,170 feet" for the height either of this or of nearby Widow's Tears is obscure. But in any case, this height is not supported either by a field survey or by the topo sheet. It appears that the Widow's Tears drop more or less steeply in a square alcove for about 810 feet (250 m), then proceeds to drop at generally lower angle an additional 700 feet (210 m) over a series of small stepdowns and slabs.

Since both Silver Strand and Widow's Tears are located on streams draining small, relatively low areas, they both dry up completely in a normal year by mid June since they are fed exclusively by melting snow.

== See also ==
- List of waterfalls
- List of waterfalls in California
