= Lehamite Falls =

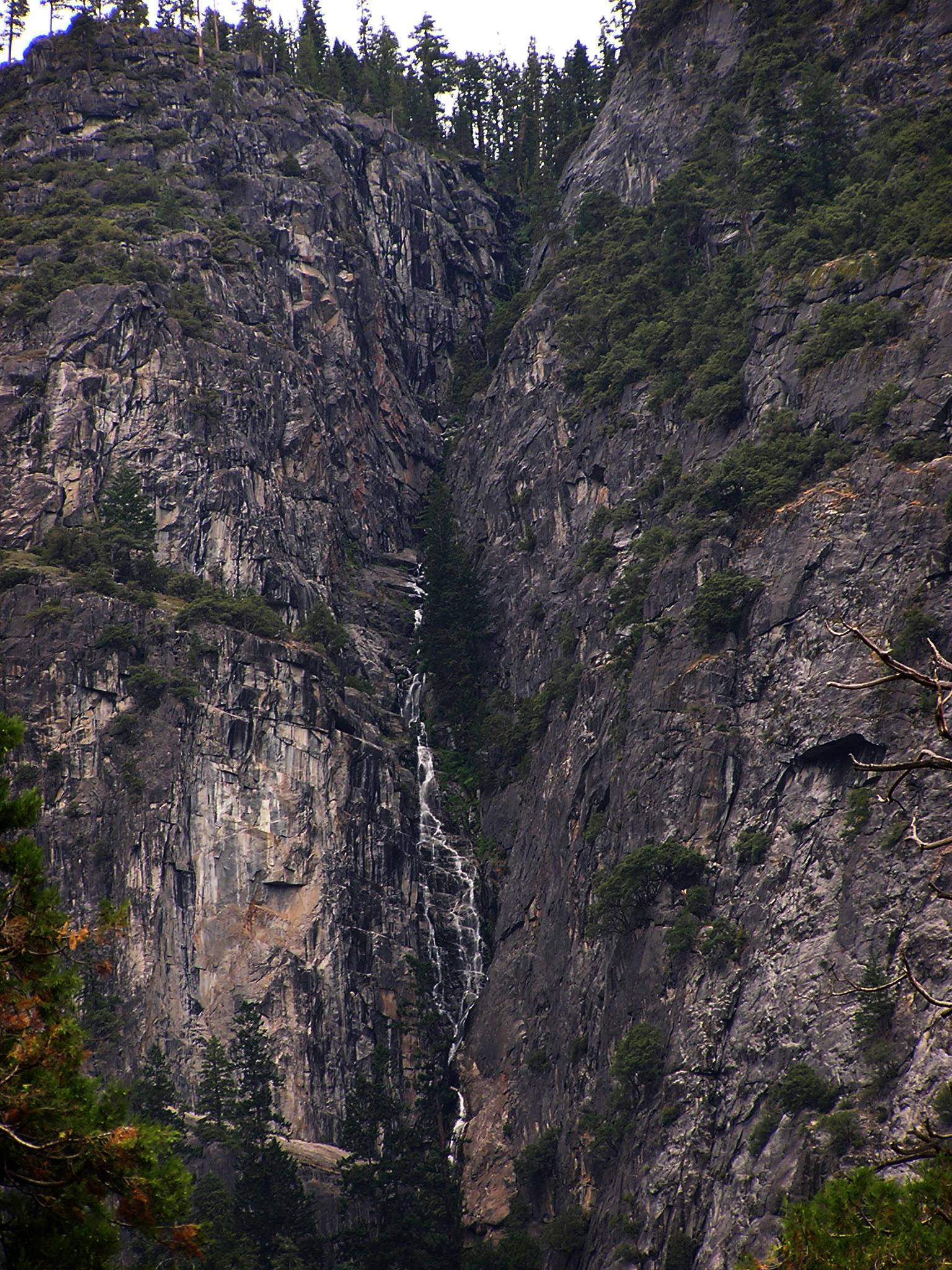
- Lehamite Falls
- Interactive map of Lehamite Falls
- Location: Yosemite Valley, Yosemite NP, CA, US
- Coordinates: 37°45′45″N 119°34′44″W
- Type: Cascade
- Total height: 1,180 ft (360 m)
- Number of drops: n/a
- Longest drop: n/a
- World height ranking: 195

Lehamite Falls is located in Yosemite National Park. It consists of a long series of steep cascades that fall 1,180 feet (360 m) into Yosemite Valley, in a manner similar to Sentinel Fall. The falls are located in a small cleft in the north wall of the valley known as Indian Canyon, immediately to the right of Yosemite Falls and seen above Yosemite Village. "Lehamite" is a native word for "arrowwood."

Lehamite Falls is probably the most underappreciated significant waterfall in Yosemite National Park, simply because it's located almost right next to Yosemite Falls, so people don't usually pay any attention to it. It is also little known since the falls appear only in the early spring or after a heavy rainfall. It is one of the few features in the park that has retained its original Ahwaneechee name.
