= The Jams =

Waterfall in Lake County, California, US

Coordinates: 38.9705°N 122.5241°W

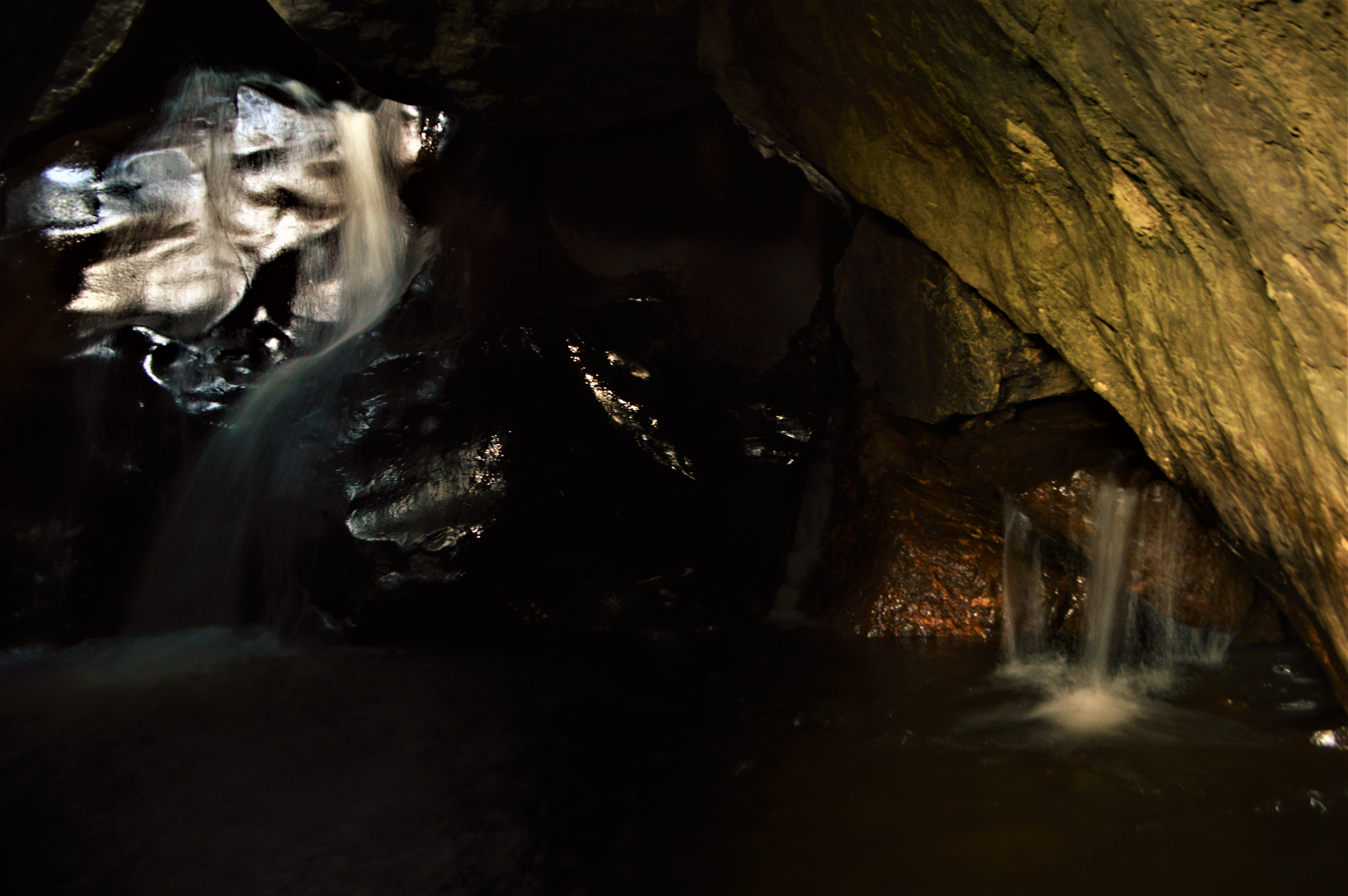
Inside the talus cave along the second tier of The Jams waterfall

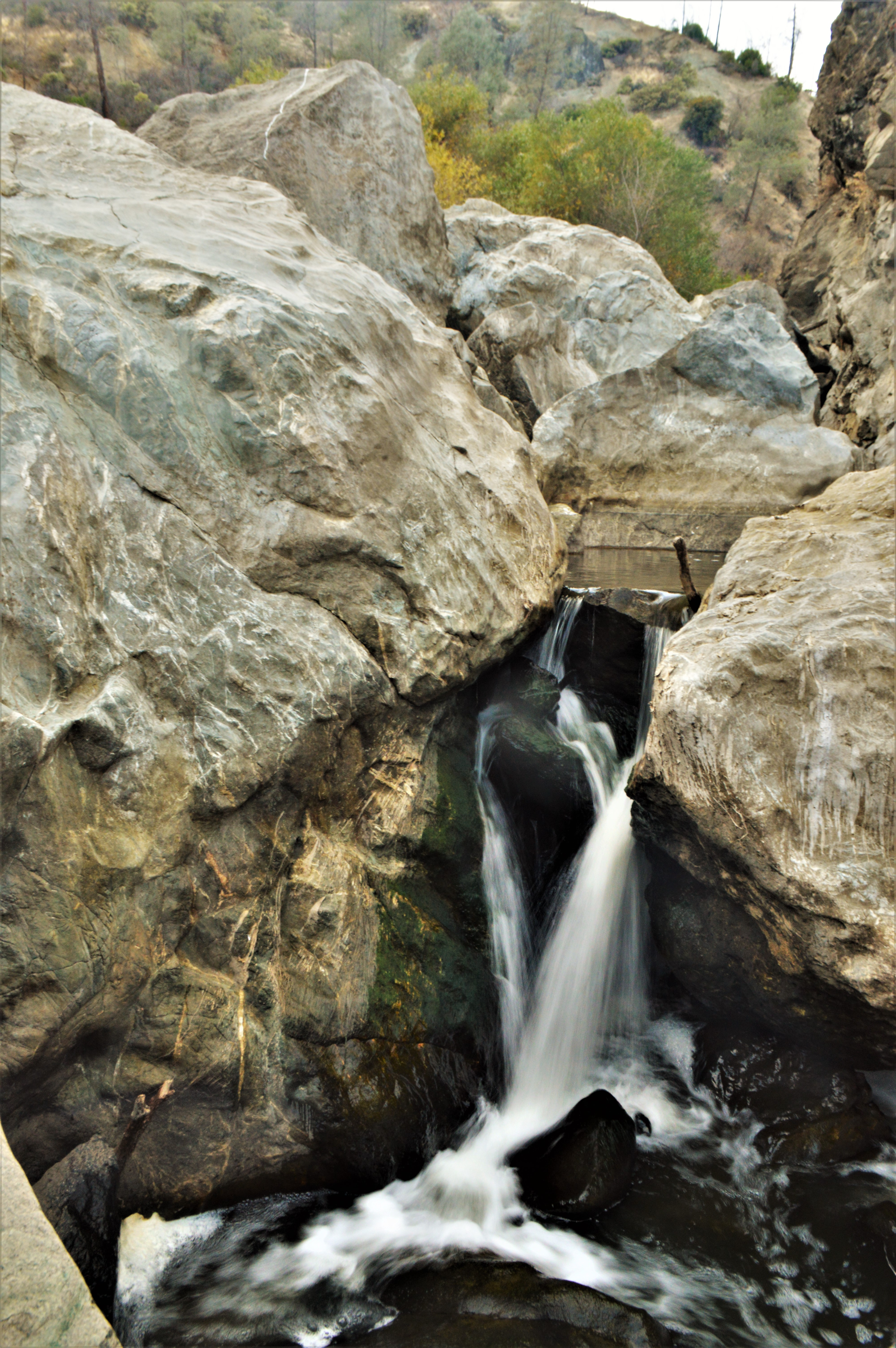
The lowest tier on The Jams waterfall

The Jams is a 30-foot (9.1 m) waterfall along Cache Creek in Lake County, California. The Jams is a three tiered waterfall located approximately three miles (4.8 km) upstream of the confluence with the North Fork Cache Creek. Each of the tiers are approximately ten feet (3.0 m) tall. The lowest tier is an above ground waterfall while the upper two tiers cascade underground through talus caves caused by boulders falling off the surrounding cliffs and into the creek channel. The Jams is a class VI rapid during high flows and is completely impassable since the river flows into the boulders and through the talus caves.

In 2003, J. R. Owens drowned when he got caught in the rapids, an area too dangerous from which to retrieve his remains.

== See also ==
- List of waterfalls
- List of waterfalls in California
