= Fish Canyon Falls =

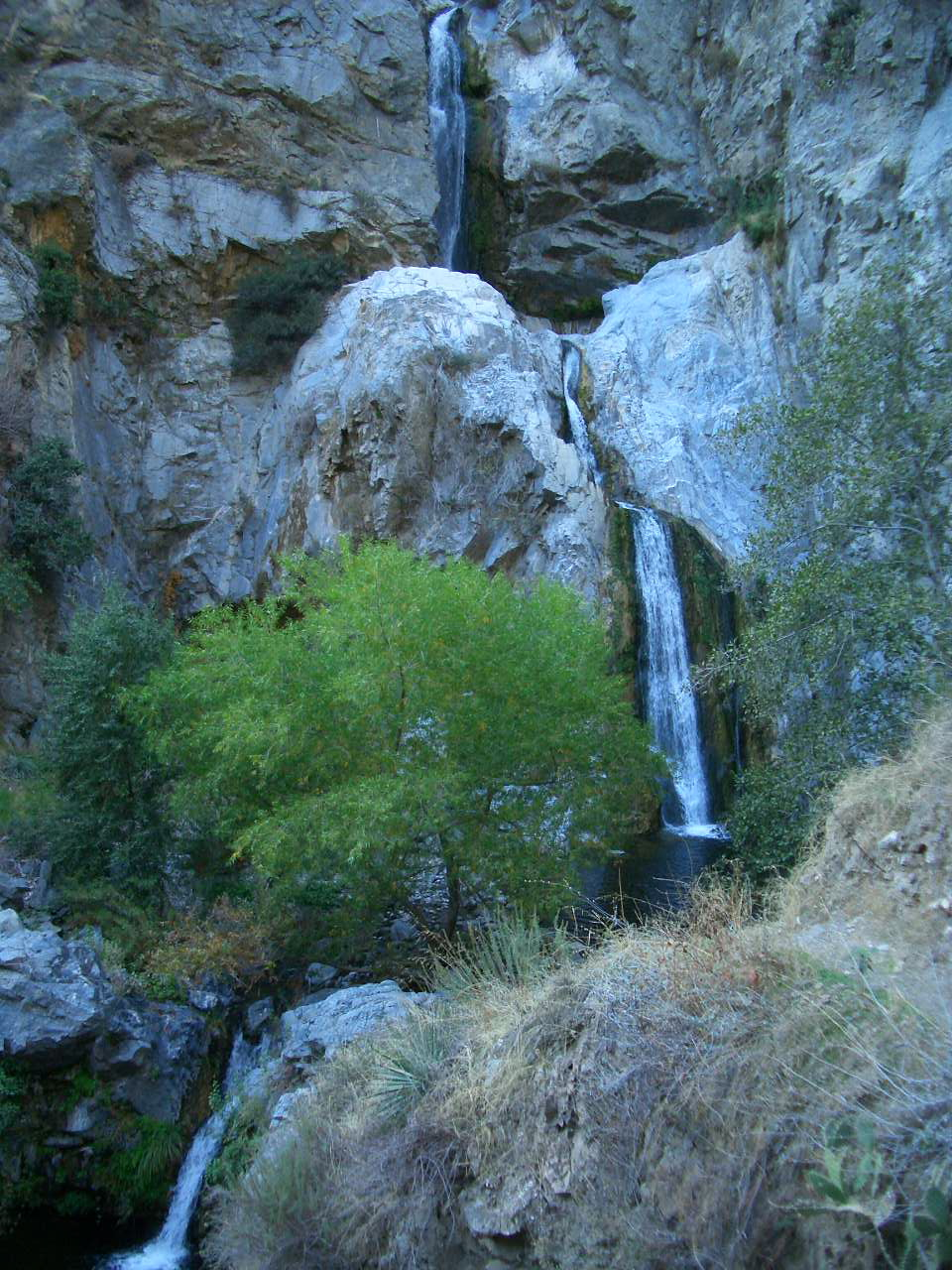
- Fish Canyon Falls in Angeles National Forest

- Location within the Los Angeles metropolitan area
- Location: Duarte, California, Los Angeles County, California, United States
- Coordinates: 34°10′52″N 117°55′32″W
- Type: Tiered
- Elevation: 1,350 feet (410 m)
- Total height: 80 feet (24 m)
- Number of drops: 4
- Watercourse: Fish Canyon Creek

Fish Canyon Falls is a tiered waterfall located within the city limits of Duarte, in Los Angeles County, California. The falls lie along Fish Canyon Creek in the San Gabriel Mountains National Monument, managed by the United States Forest Service as part of the Angeles National Forest.

The falls drop approximately 80 feet (24 m) in four tiers. Unlike many seasonal waterfalls in Southern California, it maintains a fairly reliable flow year-round due to upstream springs, though flows may diminish significantly in late summer.

A 4.8-mile (7.7 km) round-trip hiking trail (currently closed) provides access to the falls.

== History ==
The popularity of Fish Canyon Falls emerged during the broader national and international hiking boom of the 1920s, driven by increased automobile accessibility, an expanding middle class, and conservation efforts promoting outdoor recreation.

Directions from a 1936 article in the Los Angeles Times described access as follows: "Drive Foothill Boulevard to the first road turning north, west of the San Gabriel River, up this road to the mouth of Fish Canyon and park the auto. Hike up the canyon road to the Metropolitan Water District tunnel, one mile, find the trail starting just below the tunnel and follow up the canyon to the falls, 1.8 miles. There is a picnic ground around the pool between the lower and middle falls. Return by same route. Total hike, 5.5 miles."

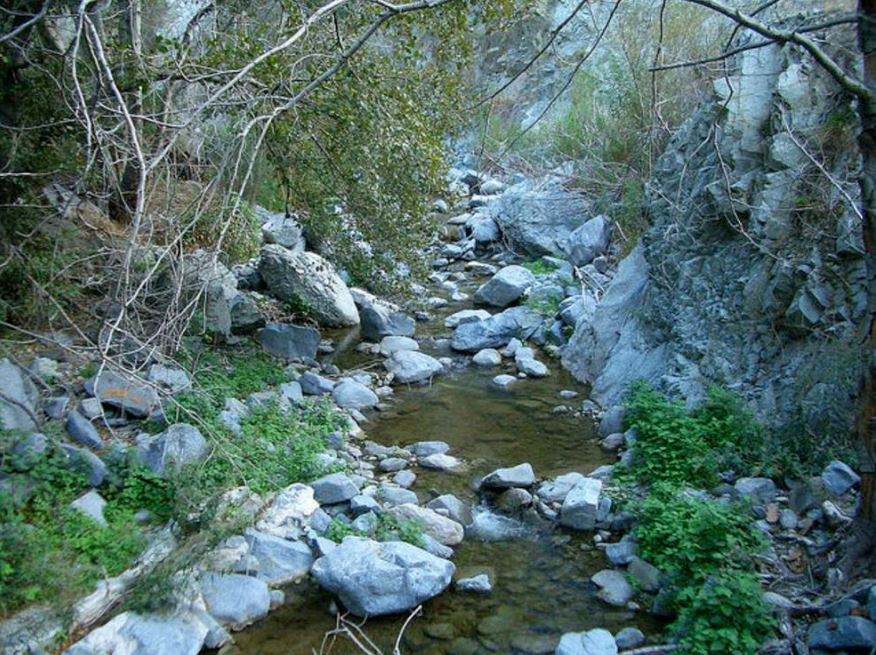
Fish Canyon Creek in Angeles National Monument, 2017

Approximately 50 vacation cabins once stood along Fish Canyon Creek, built to accommodate visitors during this recreational boom, but these were destroyed by a wildfire in 1958.

From the early 1980s until 2014, public access to Fish Canyon Falls was severely restricted due to quarry operations conducted by Vulcan Materials at the canyon’s entrance. This restriction echoed historical and ongoing tensions between Duarte residents and the mining industry in Azusa. In fact, the City of Duarte incorporated in 1957, largely in response to concerns about the encroachment of quarrying into residential neighborhoods and valued recreational areas such as Fish Canyon. Shortly before Duarte’s incorporation, the City of Azusa strategically annexed the land surrounding the Fish Canyon trailhead to protect ongoing rock quarry operations from being halted by Duarte’s anticipated municipal regulations.

After decades of public advocacy, negative publicity, and litigation aimed at restoring access to the cherished local resource, Vulcan Materials opened a more accessible trail route through the quarry property in 2014, significantly easing hikers’ access to the falls. Unfortunately, just two years after its reopening, the trail was severely damaged by the San Gabriel Complex Fire of 2016, forcing an extended closure for repairs and environmental restoration efforts that remain ongoing.

In 2024, Duarte received a $1 million federal grant to restore and reopen the trail. New parking, shuttle, and restroom facilities will be built.

== See also ==
- List of waterfalls
- List of waterfalls of California
