= Bonita Falls =

Coordinates: 34°13′49″N 117°30′17″W

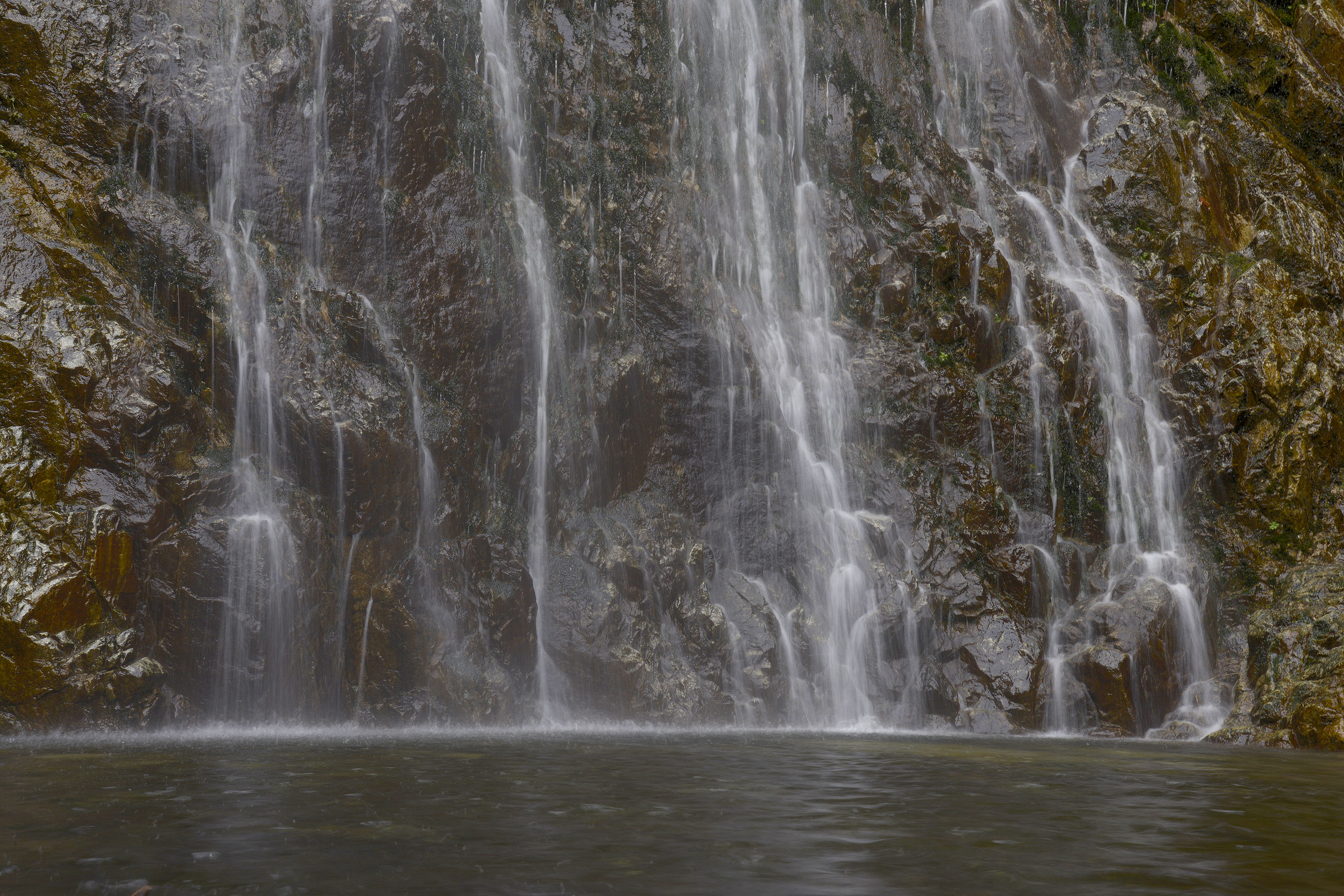
- Bonita Falls in 2016

- Location within California
- Location: San Bernardino National Forest, San Bernardino County, California, United States
- Type: Tiered
- Total height: 400 or 495 feet (122 or 151 meters)
- Number of drops: 4
- Longest drop: 195 feet (59 meters)
- Average width: 10 feet (3.0 meters)

Bonita Falls are a set of waterfalls in the San Bernardino National Forest, formed by unnamed tributary to South Fork Lytle Creek, that is said to be 370 or 400 feet (113 or 122 meters) in height, but possibly up to 495 feet high because of two undocumented drops in the canyon above. It is the second tallest in the national forest, being surpassed only by 500-foot (150 m) Big Falls. These two waterfalls are reputably the tallest in southern California.

== Characteristics ==
Bonita Falls are split into three tiers, and in the canyon above are two more waterfalls. These two waterfalls are a 60-foot (18 m) segmented and a 25-foot (7.6 m) cascade. In the lower canyon, near where the creek meets South Fork Lytle Creek, the upper tier is a 195-foot cascade. Following downstream is a 45-foot (14 m) slide. The final, steepest drop, Lower Bonita Falls, plunges 160 feet (49 m) into the final reach of Bonita Canyon. The total height of the waterfall is 495 feet (151 m) considering the upper two drops, and the total height of the actual waterfall is 400 feet (120 m) not counting the upstream drops. The canyon through which the falls pass has been covered in many parts with graffiti and litter.

== Seasonality and access ==
The falls are usually flowing year-round and the lower falls are reached via a popular, approximately 3/4 mile (1,200 m) hike (each way). The first 1/2 mile (800 m) follows the South Fork Lytle Creek wash to a side trail that takes you approximately 1/4 mile (400 m) to the base of the falls. The trailhead for the falls is an unsigned turnout parking area along Lytle Creek Road, one mile past the Front Country Ranger Station in Lytle Creek. A National Forest Adventure Pass is required to park there and on summer weekends it can fill up early. The Adventure Pass and a map to the falls are available at the ranger station. The upper tier can also be viewed from Bonita Ranch Campground, just past the parking area, but access is on private property.

== See also ==
- List of waterfalls
- List of waterfalls in California
