= Etiwanda Falls =

Waterfall in California

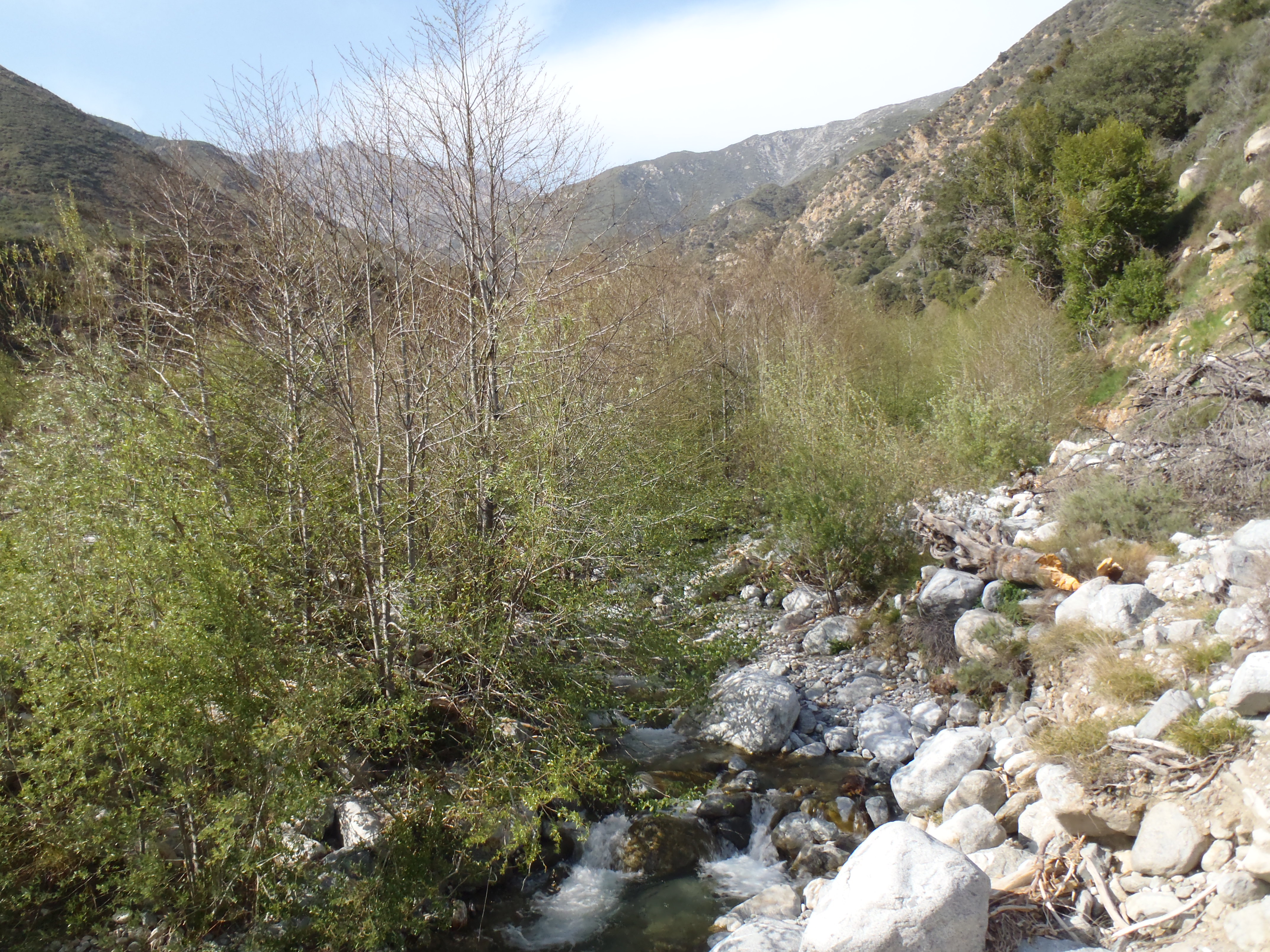
- A creek near the falls

- Location within the Los Angeles metropolitan area Location within California Location within the United States
- Location: North Etiwanda Preserve, Rancho Cucamonga, California
- Coordinates: 34.1859°N 117.5232°W
- Total height: ~50 ft (15 m)
- Number of drops: 3
- Watercourse: East Etiwanda Creek

Etiwanda Falls is a waterfall in North Etiwanta Preserve in Rancho Cucamonga, California. It is fed by East Etiwanda Creek and can be accessed through a short 1.6 mi (2.6 km) hike into a canyon. The approximately 50 ft (15 m) falls were created by two streams that merged and funneled the water into one area. It has three drops, which are about 15 ft (4.6 m), 10 ft (3.0 m), and 25 ft (7.6 m) respectively.

== See also ==
- List of waterfalls in California
