= Bassi Falls =

Sierra Nevadan waterfall in California, USA

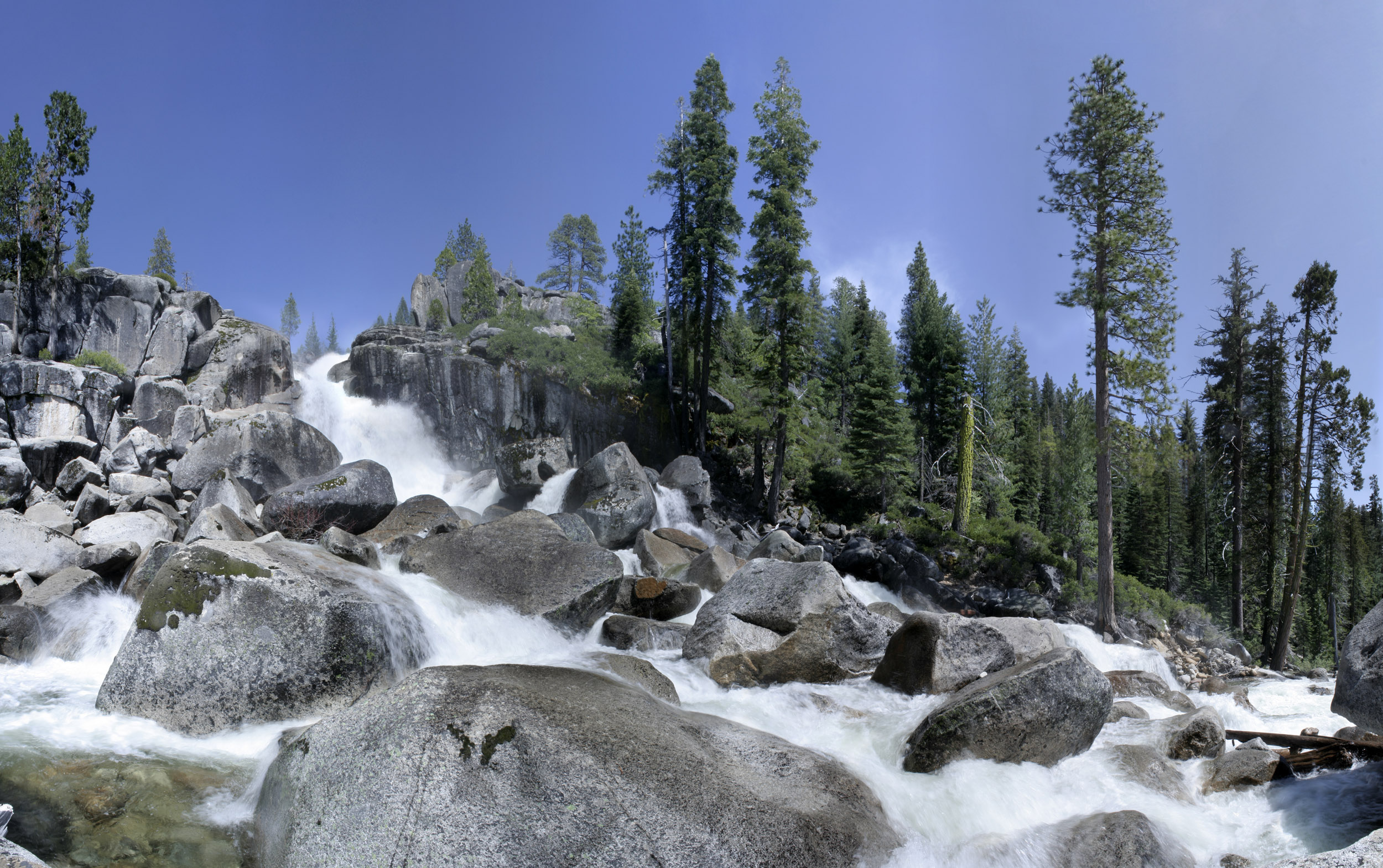

- Bassi Falls (California)
- Interactive map of Bassi Falls
- Coordinates: 38.892609°N 120.330297°W
- Elevation: 5,476 feet (1,669 m)
- Total height: 109 feet (33 m)

Bassi Falls is a waterfall in the Sierra Nevada mountain range, to the west of Lake Tahoe in El Dorado County, California. The falls are part of the El Dorado National Forest and are at the end of a 1.2 miles (1.9 km) hiking trail with an approximately 200 feet (61 m) elevation gain. Bassi Falls are 109 feet (33 m) high, with granite rocks creating the various drops. The area immediately surrounding the falls features multiple swimming holes. To reach the falls, visitors must use an unpaved road named Ice House Road to reach a parking area near Union Valley Reservoir; it is recommended to use a 4WD vehicle.

== See also ==
- List of waterfalls
- List of waterfalls in California
