= Wapama Falls =

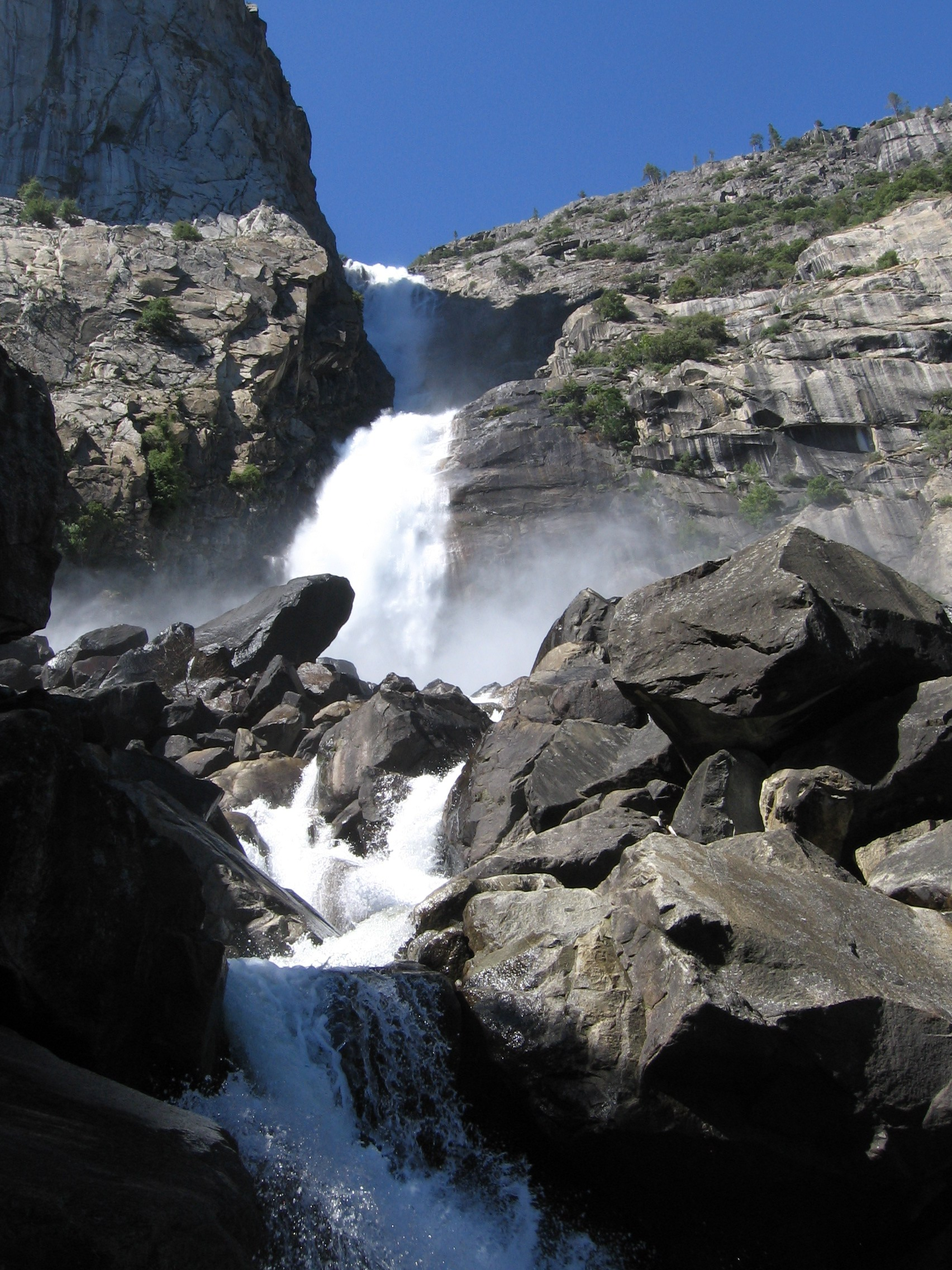
- Interactive map of Wapama Falls
- Location: Hetch Hetchy Valley, Yosemite National Park, Tuolumne County, California, United States
- Coordinates: 37°58′02″N 119°45′56″W
- Type: Tiered
- Total height: 1,080 ft (330 m)
- Number of drops: 3
- Longest drop: 300 ft (90 m)
- Watercourse: Falls Creek
- World height ranking: 148

Wapama Falls is the larger of two waterfalls located on Falls Creek on the northern wall of Hetch Hetchy Valley below Hetch Hetchy Dome, in Yosemite National Park. The other waterfall, Tueeulala Falls, is on a separate seasonal distributary of Falls Creek. Wapama Falls flows year-round and during peak flow has been known to inundate the trail bridge crossing its base, making the falls impossible to pass. The falls consist of two primary drops angled roughly 60 degrees to each other, and a broad cascade at its base.

Wapama Falls descends just under 1,100 feet. Like Yosemite Falls, it has three distinct parts. The topmost is a free drop of perhaps 300 feet, followed by a steeply-cascading stream which descends 600 feet in a steep-sided gorge, much like the stream between Upper and Lower Yosemite Fall. These cascades cannot be seen in their entirety from the trail or dam, due to topography; such a view is seen from across the valley high on Kolana Rock. Finally, the bottom drop, seen from the dam and intimately from the trail, is one of about 200 feet down an escarpment that is not vertical, but in high water the water shoots outward to clear this descent.

Visitors can reach Wapama Falls by hiking 2.5 miles (4.0 km) up Hetch Hetchy Reservoir Trail from O'Shaughnessy Dam.

== See also ==
- List of waterfalls
- List of waterfalls in California
- List of waterfalls in Yosemite National Park
