= Uvas Falls =

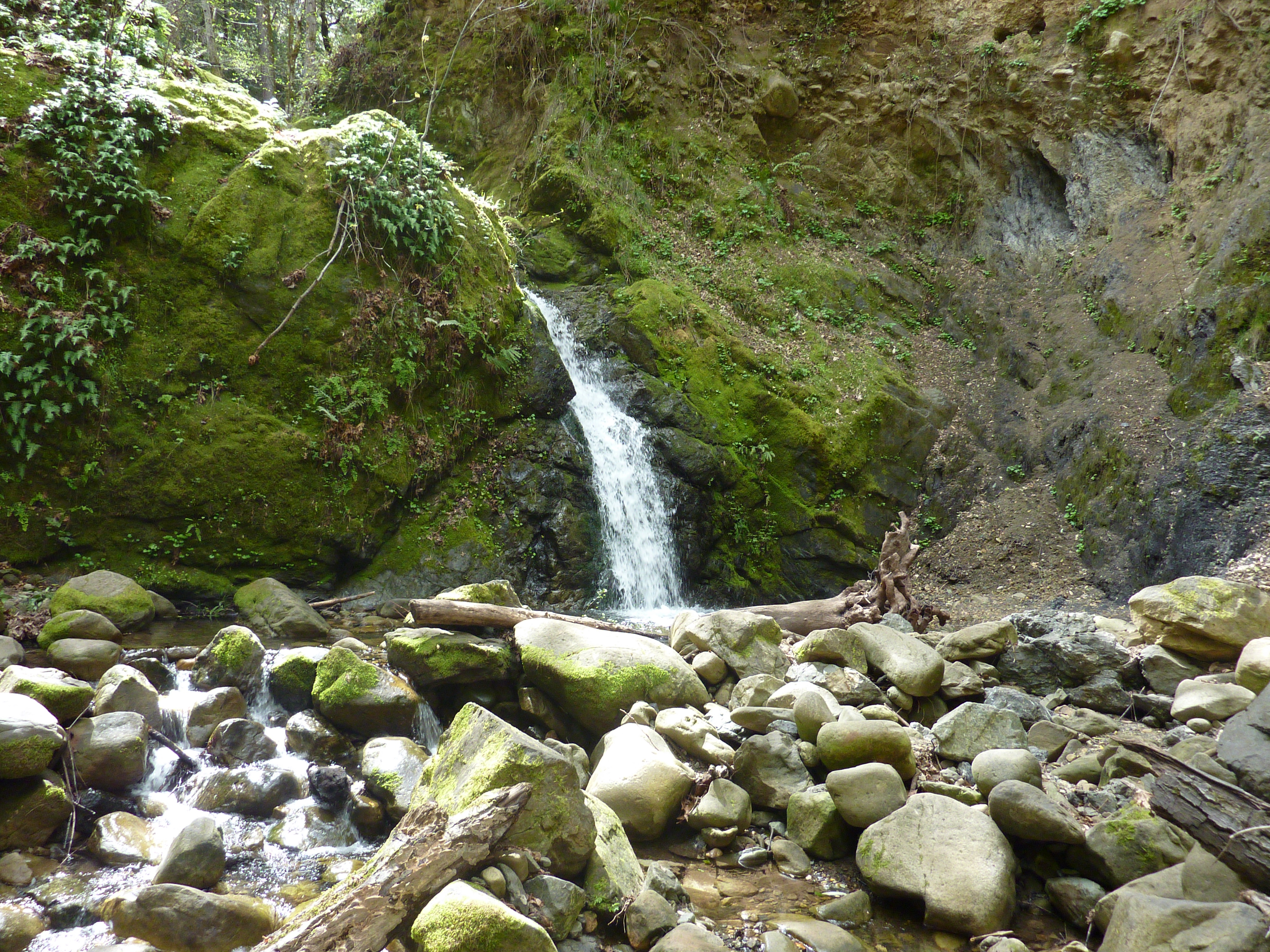
- Interactive map of Uvas Falls
- Location: Uvas Canyon County Park CA
- Coordinates: 37.0850441°N 121.79249°W
- Elevation: 1,546 ft (471 m)
- Total height: 30 ft (9.1 m)
- Number of drops: 6
- Average width: 5 ft (1.5 m)

Uvas Falls is located in Uvas Canyon County Park, near Morgan Hill, California. Nearby falls include Basin Falls, Black Rock Falls, Triple Falls, Upper Falls, and Granuja Falls.

== See also ==
- List of waterfalls
- List of waterfalls in California
