= Staircase Falls =

Waterfall in Yosemite National Park, California, US

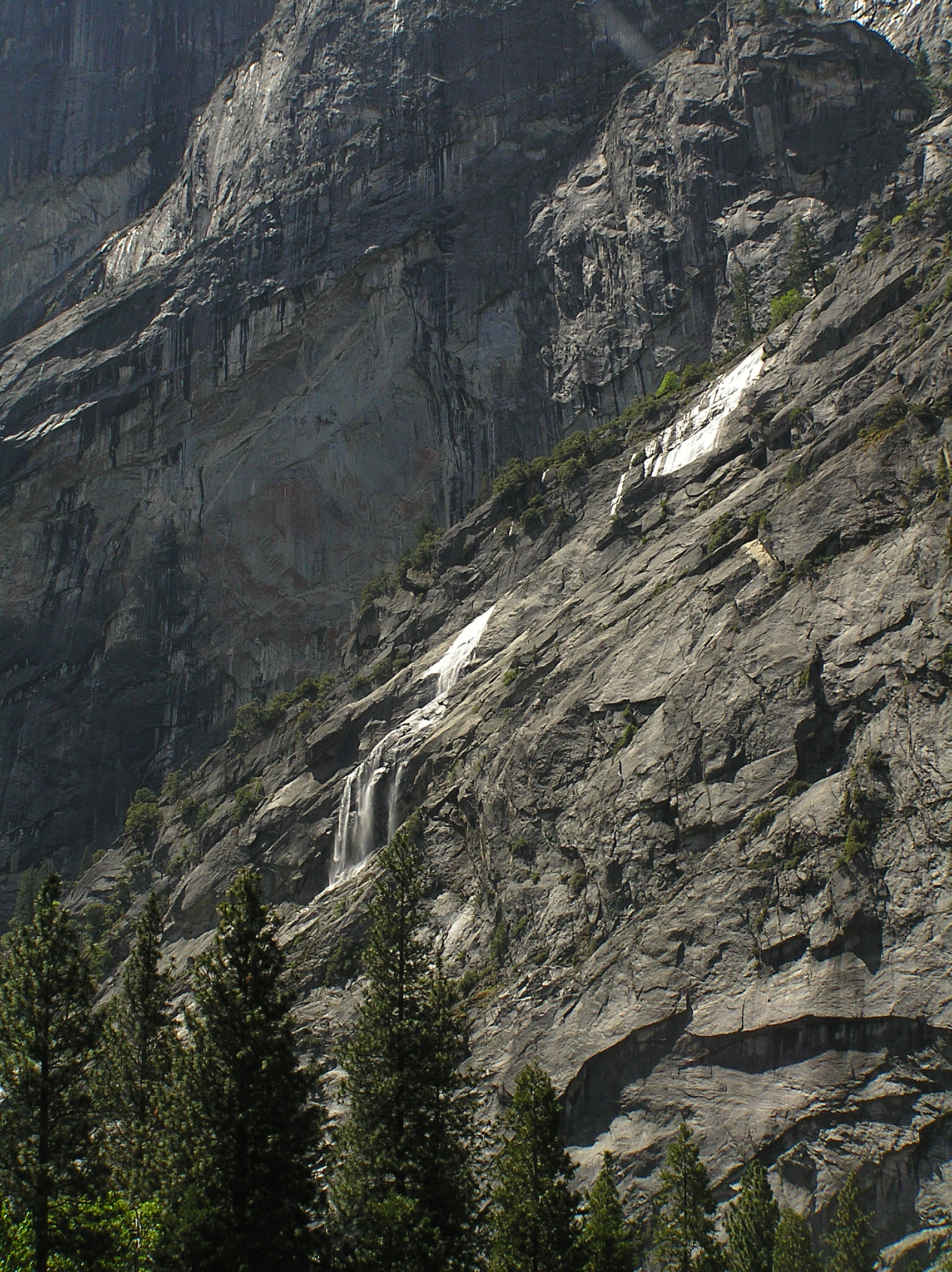

- Location within California
- Location: Yosemite Valley, Yosemite NP, CA, US
- Coordinates: 37°44′07″N 119°34′30″W
- Type: Tiered
- Total height: 1,300 ft (400 m)
- World height ranking: 228

Staircase Falls is a series of waterfalls located on the southern side of Yosemite Valley in Yosemite National Park, California. The falls descend a total of 1,300 feet (400 m) into Yosemite Valley over a series of steps. Staircase Falls is relatively ephemeral and is usually dry by the end of June. The falls are located immediately behind Camp Curry on cliffs below Glacier Point.

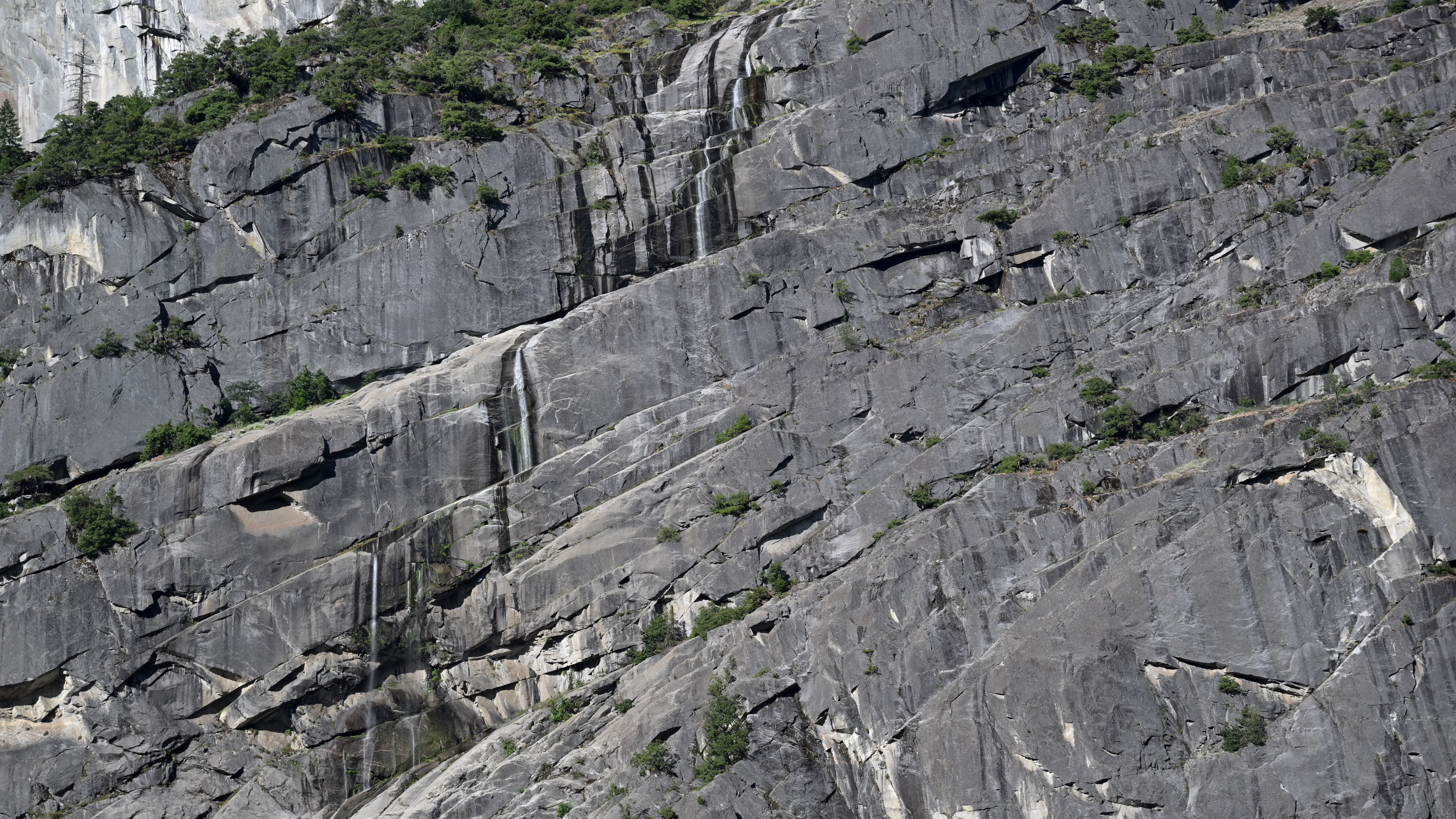
Staircase Falls upper tiers

== See also ==
- List of waterfalls
- List of waterfalls in Yosemite National Park
