= Sentinel Fall =

Waterfall in Yosemite National Park, California, US

Sentinel Falls
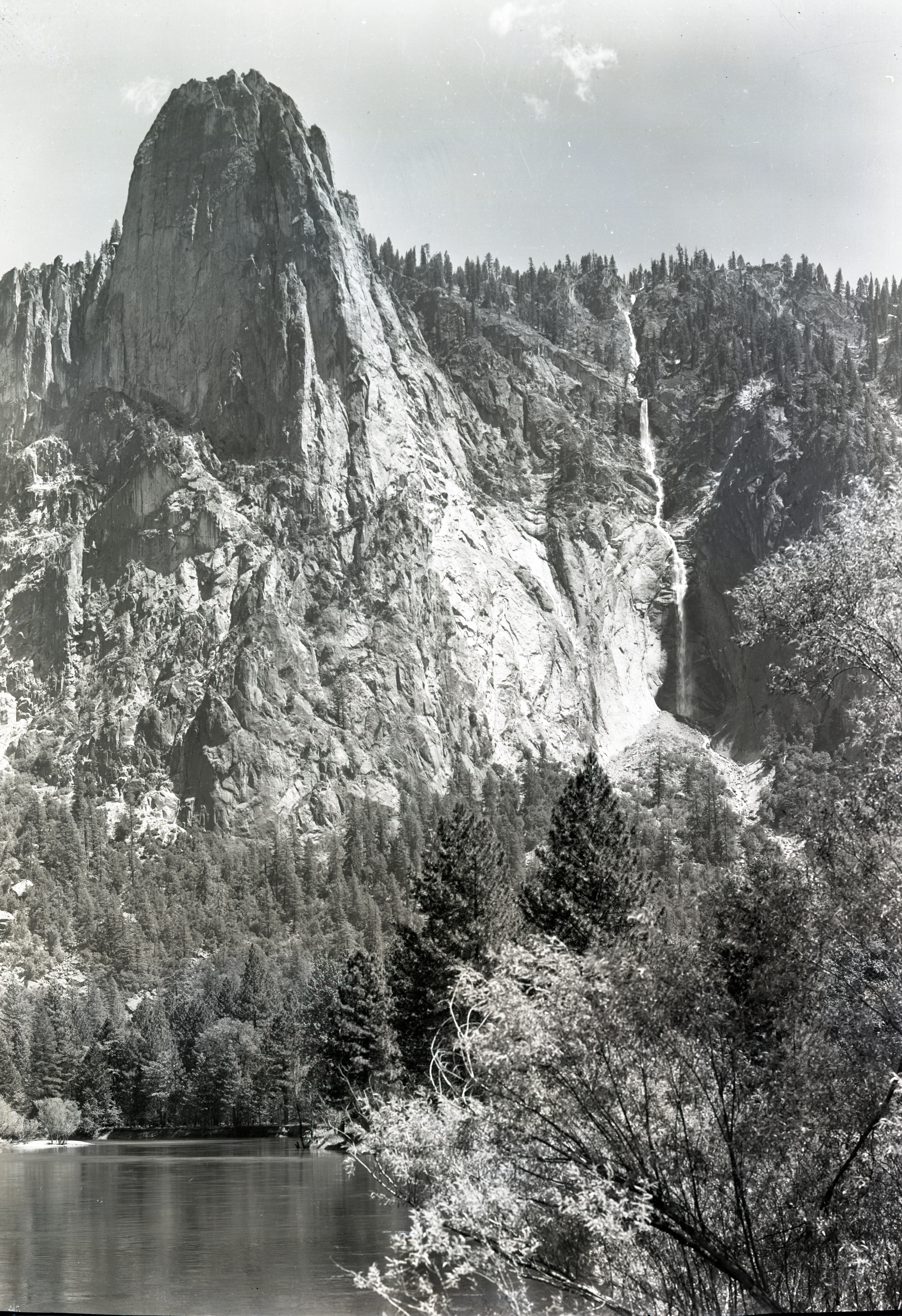
- Interactive map of Sentinel Falls
- Location: Yosemite Valley, Yosemite NP, CA, US
- Coordinates: 37°43′40″N 119°35′48″W
- Type: Tiered
- Total height: 1,920 ft (590 m)
- Number of drops: 6
- Longest drop: 500 ft (150 m)
- World height ranking: 60

Sentinel Falls is a long series of cascades descending into Yosemite Valley, in the U.S. state of California, alongside Sentinel Rock. It is a tiered waterfall consisting of 6 major drops totaling 1,920 feet (590 m), the longest single drop being 500 feet (150 m). It ranks on many lists as the twelfth-highest waterfall in the world, although in truth it is roughly the sixtieth-tallest, as most weaker waterfalls do not make it into such lists. Despite its immense height it has a relatively low drainage and is usually dry by July.

== See also ==
- List of waterfalls
- List of waterfalls in Yosemite National Park
