= Pywiack Cascade =

- Interactive map of Pywiack Cascade
- Location: Yosemite National Park, California
- Coordinates: 37°47′14″N 119°29′20″W
- Type: Horsetail
- Total height: 600 ft (180 m)
- Number of drops: 1
- Watercourse: Tenaya Creek
- Average flow rate: 120 cu ft/s (3.4 m^{3}/s)

The Pywiack Cascade is a waterfall in Yosemite National Park within the U.S. state of California. It is located a few miles downstream from the outlet of Tenaya Lake on Tenaya Creek at the head of the steep and rugged granite gorge, Tenaya Canyon. The waterfall can be viewed from Glacier Point, or by a 6-mile (9.7 km) hike from Olmsted Point, but the canyon is dangerous and the waterfall is unsafe to be reached on foot. The waterfall is highly seasonal. It typically rages in the spring and early summer while shrinking to a trickle by late summer to mid-autumn.

The water of the Pywiack Cascade slides down a steep angle of solid granite, for a total of about 600 feet (180 m). A small waterfall lies directly below the main drop. Below that, the creek continues over jumbled talus for less than a quarter of a mile (0.4 km) before it plunges over another large waterfall. Not much farther downstream is Three Chute Falls whose waters continue on into Mirror Lake and then finally empty into the Merced River, within Yosemite Valley.

To the right of the Cascade while looking straight at it, there is another, ephemeral waterfall that tumbles down a steep granite cliff. This waterfall is of very little volume but is much taller than Pywiack Cascade.

"Py-we-ack" in the native language means "glistening rocks", and the native people applied it to both the creek and Tenaya Lake, due to the abundance of glacial polish in the upper Tenaya basin. The name "Pywiack" has since been applied to Pywiack Dome.

== See also ==
- List of waterfalls
- List of waterfalls in Yosemite National Park
