= Little Yosemite Valley =

Valley in Mariposa County, California

- Little Yosemite Valley from Washburn Point

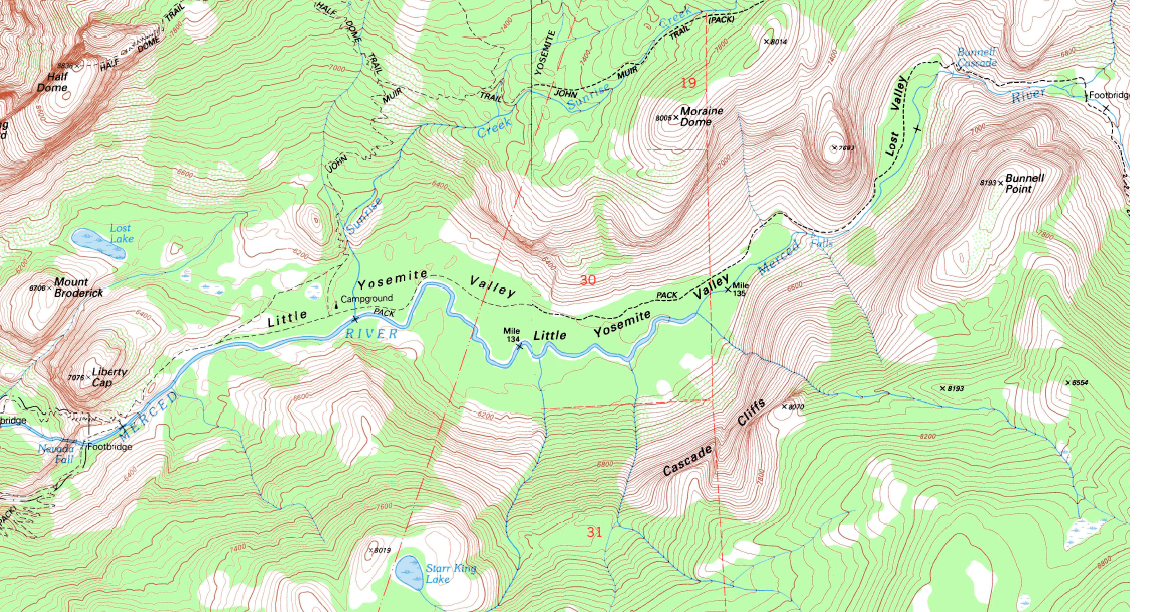
- Little Yosemite Valley Topographic Map
- Floor elevation: 6,150 feet (1,870 m)
- Length: 3.5 miles (5.6 km)

Geography
- Coordinates: 37°43′58″N 119°31′13″W

Little Yosemite Valley is a smaller glacial valley upstream in the Merced River drainage from the Yosemite Valley in Yosemite National Park. The Merced River meanders through the 3.5 mi (5.6 km) long flat valley, draining out over Nevada Fall and Vernal Fall before emptying into the main Yosemite Valley. It can be reached by a day hike from the main valley, and is the most popular area in the Yosemite Wilderness. The Valley provides access to nearby destinations such as the back side of Half Dome, Clouds Rest and the High Sierra Camp at Merced Lake.

Little Yosemite Valley is a tread on the glacial stairway of the Merced River that runs from Yosemite Valley up to Mount Lyell, gaining some 7,600 ft (2,316 m) of vertical elevation over 21 mi (34 km) and is situated some 2,000 ft (610 m) in elevation above Yosemite Valley proper.

== Geology ==
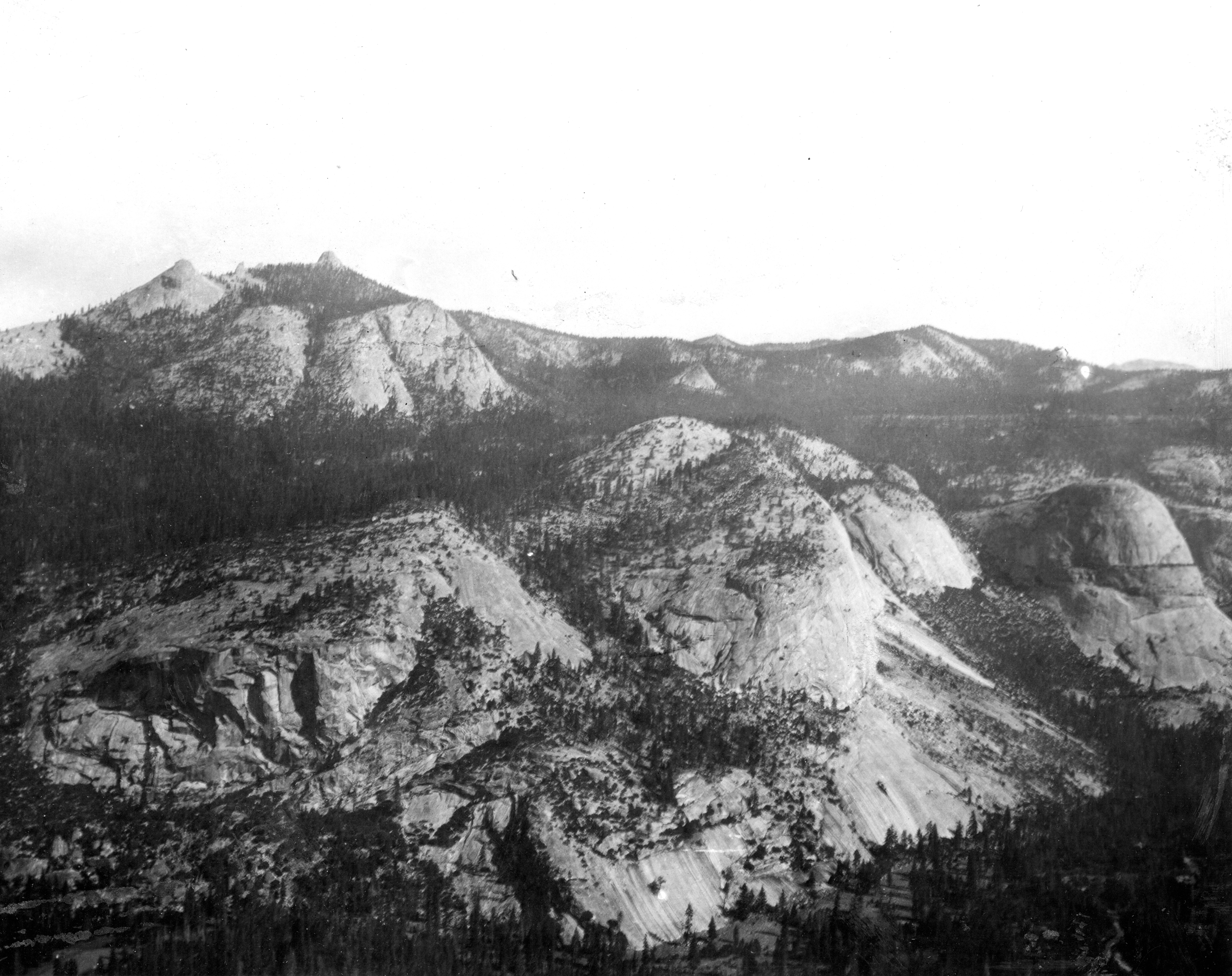
North Wall of Little Yosemite Valley

The north wall of Little Yosemite has not been subject to the same kinds of glacial planing as the south wall because the granite rocks of Moraine Dome and Sugar Bowl Dome are tougher and more resistant. This is remarkable considering that it is likely that Little Yosemite was not only scoured repeatedly by glaciers that were wholly contained by the canyon, but also overrun by glaciers that overflowed the Merced canyon and spread widely into surrounding uplands with occasional surges of ice contributed over the pass from the overflowing Tuolumne River basin. These rocks were thus subject to tremendous gravitational and flow forces yet retain a remarkable degree of integrity, eroding almost exclusively and superficially along exfoliation joints.

The south wall of the valley has been subject to extensive glacial planing, with all jointed granite completely smoothed away, leaving a stark, featureless unjointed sheer cliff face, as is apparent in the image of Little Yosemite Valley from Washburn Point, above right. The west end and south wall of the canyon are "exceptionally massive, few cliffs anywhere in the Yosemite region exhibit a more complete absence of fractures." This also leads to an almost complete absence of vegetation as well, as there are few opportunities for roothold. The north wall in contrast, and similarly to the north wall of Yosemite Valley, has been subject to much less glacial planing and is much more differentiated and vegetated.

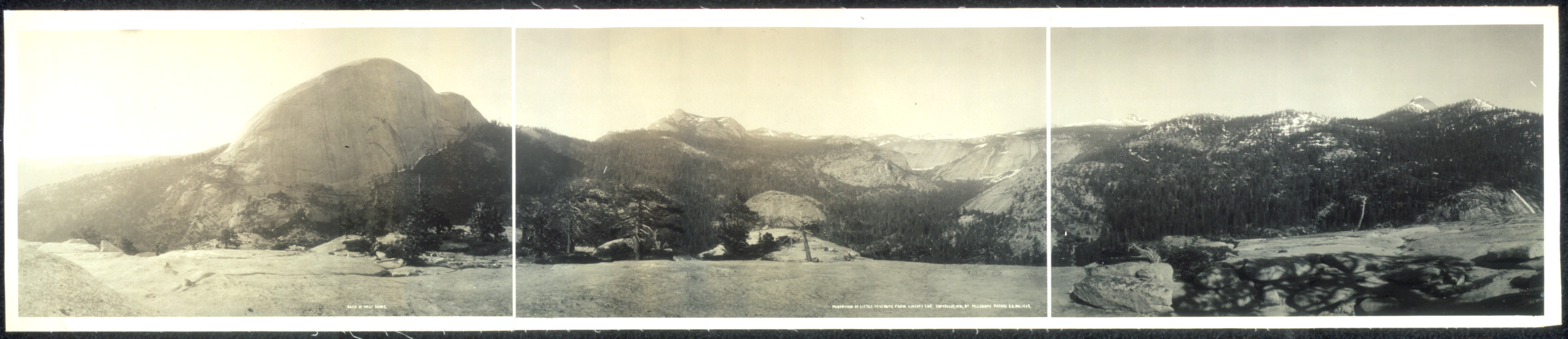
Panorama of Little Yosemite from Liberty Cap

== Features ==
=== Liberty Cap and Mount Broderick ===
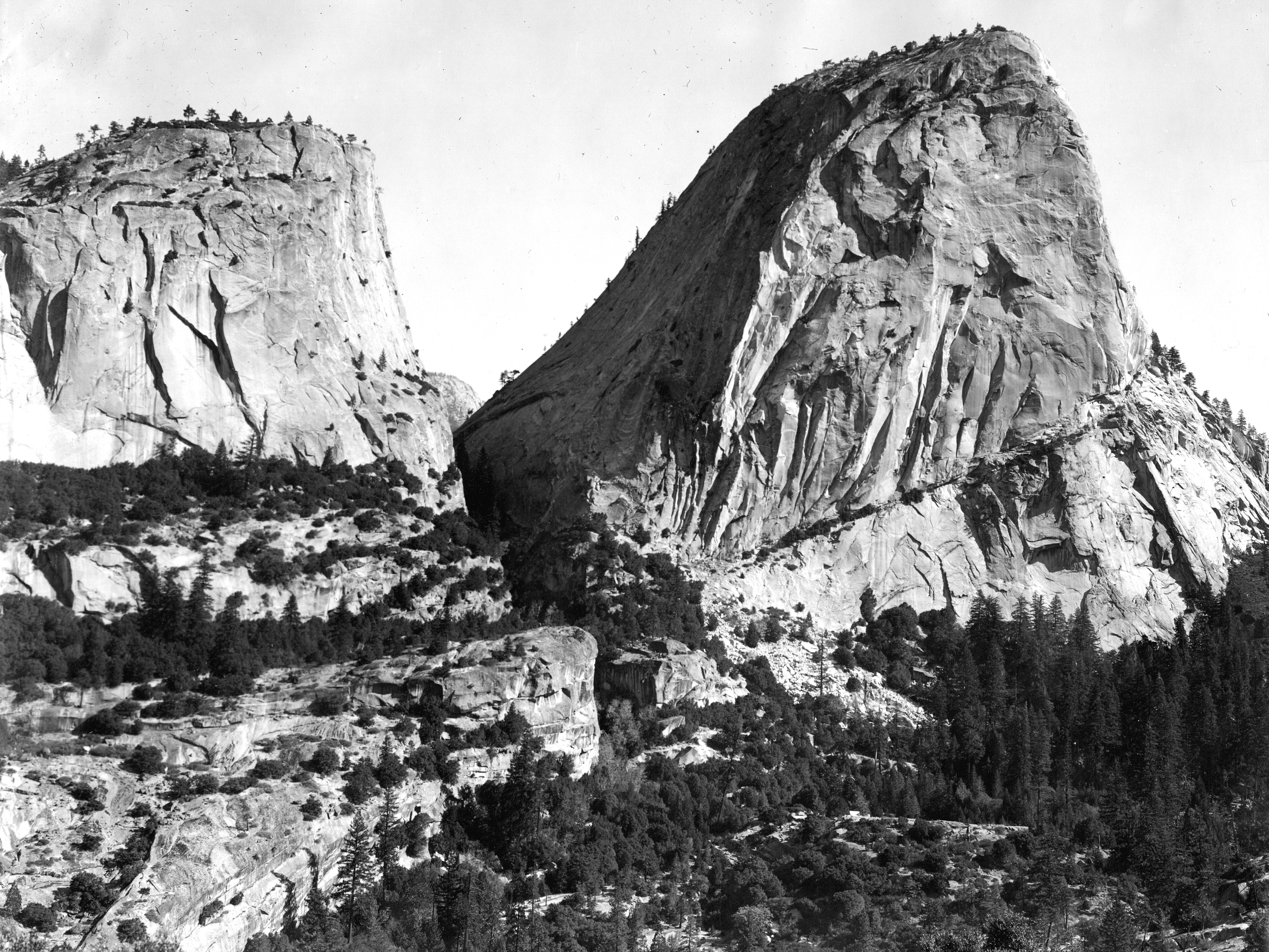
Mount Broderick and Liberty Cap

Liberty Cap is a granite dome in Yosemite National Park, California, United States, which lies at the extreme northwestern margin of Little Yosemite Valley. It lies adjacent, to the north of Nevada Fall, on the John Muir Trail at 37°43′43″N 119°31′57″W. It rises 1,700 feet (520 m) feet from the base of Nevada Fall to a peak elevation of 7,076 ft (2,157 m). A smaller, mesa-like dome called Mount Broderick stands immediately adjacent to Liberty Cap. Together, they form a barrier on the north side of the mouth of Little Yosemite Valley.

Both Liberty Cap and Mount Broderick are roches moutonnées, features that protruded above or resisting being overridden by successive Merced River glaciers because they are made of massive unjointed granite sufficiently resistant to glacial erosive power, leaving them prominent in the post-glacial landscape. Both features are glacially polished on their glacier-facing side and ragged on their leeward side.

=== Half Dome ===
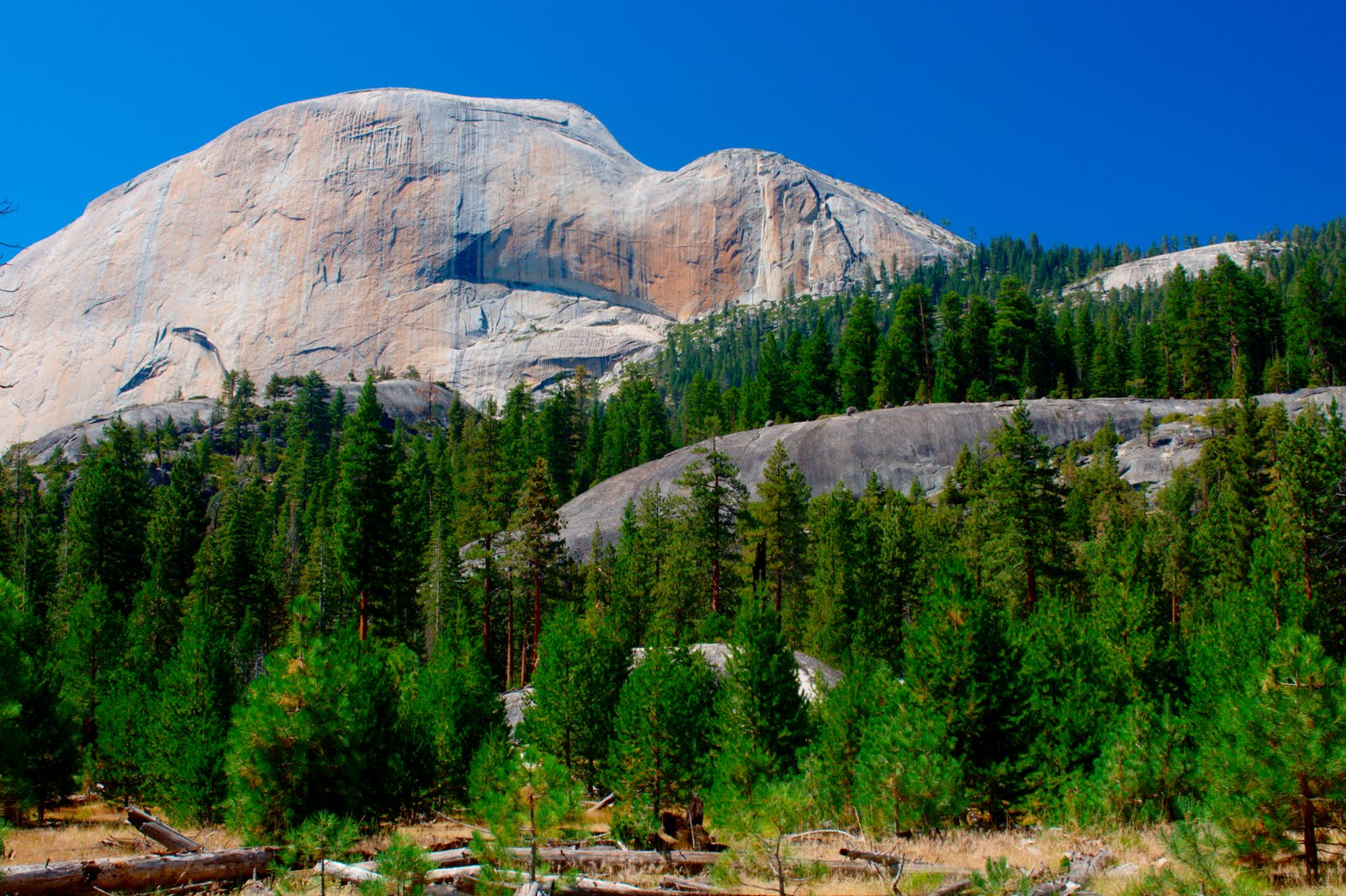
Half Dome from Little Yosemite Valley

Half Dome is a granite dome in Yosemite National Park located at the northwestern end of Little Yosemite Valley at 37°44′45.6″N 119°31′59.4″W — possibly Yosemite's most familiar rock formation. The granite crest rises more than 4,737 ft (1,444 m) above the Yosemite Valley floor at Tenaya Canyon and 2,686 ft (819 m) above the floor of Little Yosemite Valley.

The trail to Half Dome branches to the north from the main Little Yosemite Valley trail near the ranger station, out houses and campground.

=== Moraine Dome ===
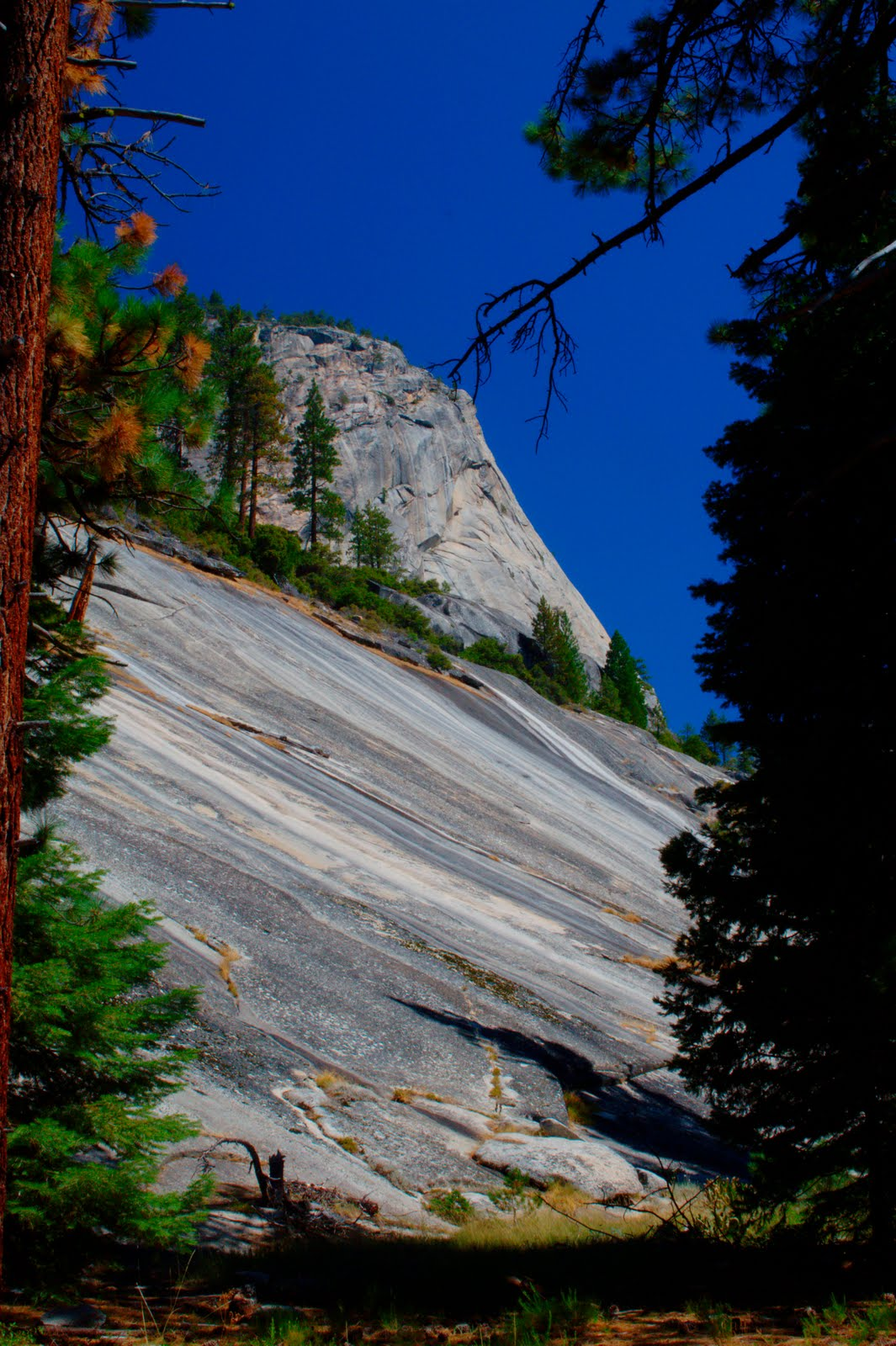
Granite Apron draping southwestern margin of Moraine Dome

Moraine Dome is a granite dome in Yosemite National Park along the northern margin of Little Yosemite Valley at 37°44′35.15″N 119°29′24.49″W which rises to an elevation of 8,036 ft (2,449 m) AMSL, 1,906 ft (581 m) above the Merced River. Moraine Dome is notable because the presence of lateral moraines from the Merced Glacier. It is likely that these moraines represent the highest level attained by glacial ice in Little Yosemite Valley. Although it is about as high as Sentinel Dome Moraine Dome is dwarfed to relative insignificance by its proximity to the bulk and elevation of Clouds Rest to the north.

The south western margin of Moraine Dome is wrapped by a broad, striped granite apron with an approximately 40° slope that appears to rise some 500 ft (152 m) from the valley floor.

=== Sugar Loaf ===
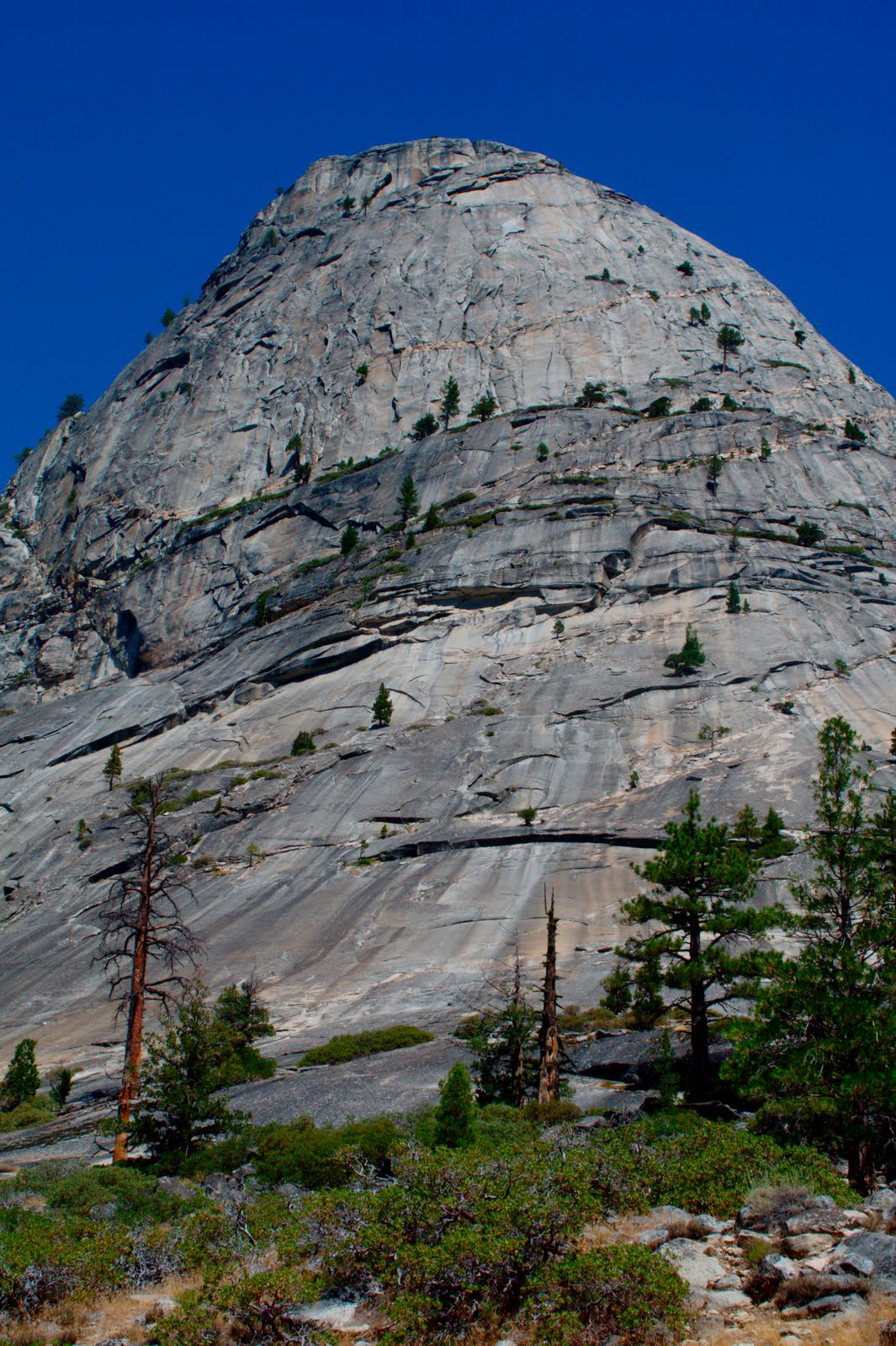
Sugar Loaf Dome

Sugar Loaf Dome is a granite dome in Yosemite National Park at the northeastern head of Little Yosemite Valley at 37°44′27.47″N 119°28′44.94″W which rises to 7,697 ft (2,346 m) AMSL.

Although Sugar Loaf Dome has been repeatedly subject to glaciation, the core of this spur has resisted the icy onslaughts because what remains today is massive throughout except for one master joint, horizontal in character. Post-glaciation, Sugar Loaf Dome retains a 1,300 feet rise over, and its shoulder perturbs the course of the Merced River and provides the relief over which the river descends into Little Yosemite via Cascade Fall.

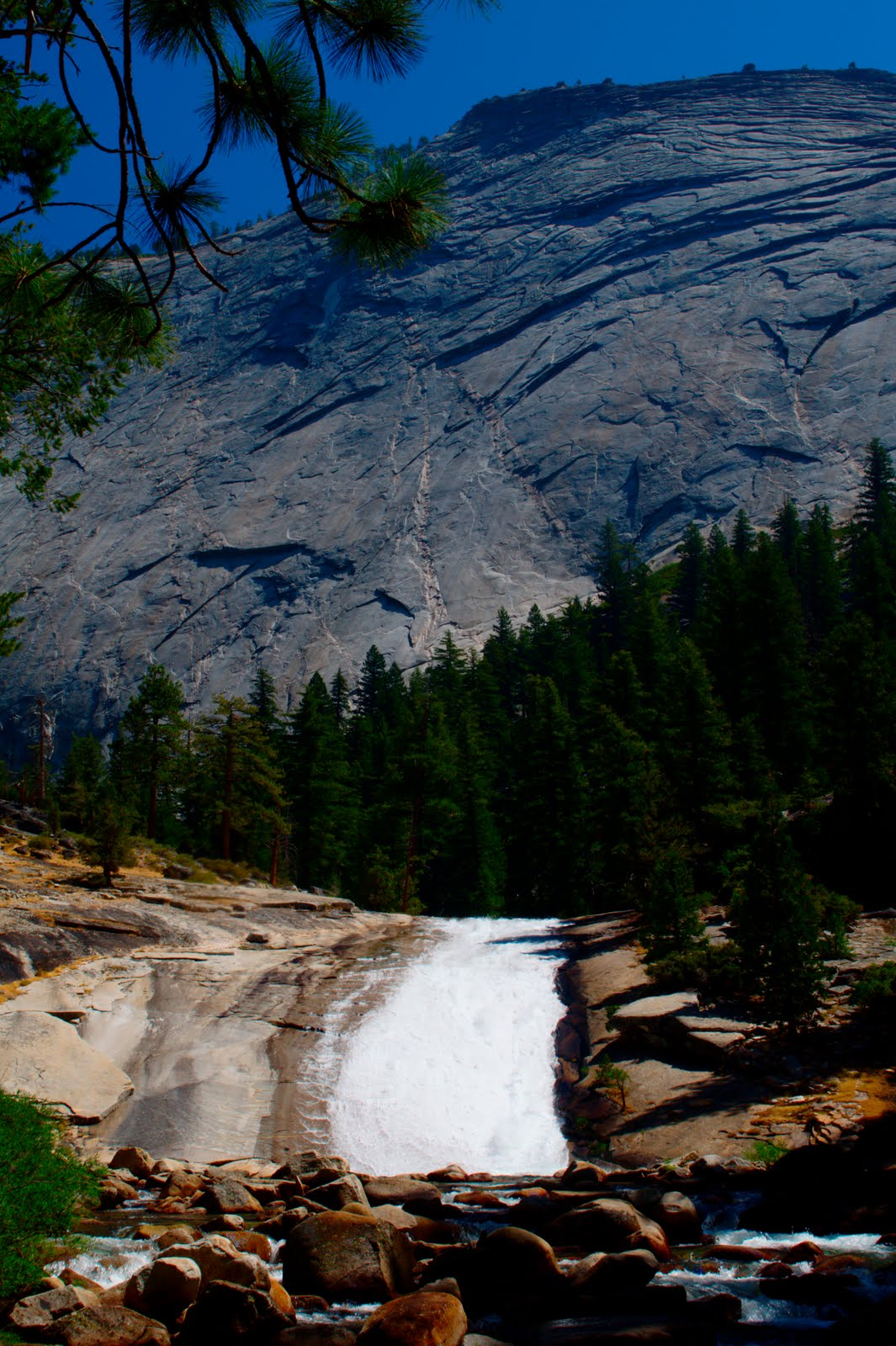
Cascade Fall

=== Cascade Fall ===
Cascade Fall at 37°44′11.32″N 119°28′53.13″W, elevation 6,225 ft (1,897 m) AMSL tumbles via a water wheel over the glacially polished granite saddle between Sugar Loaf and Bunnell Point into a delightful pool at the eastern head of Little Yosemite Valley. This cascade is often mistaken for Bunnell Cascade which is located between the Lost Valley and Echo Valley at 37°44′43.87″N 119°28′14.95″W.

=== Bunnell Point ===
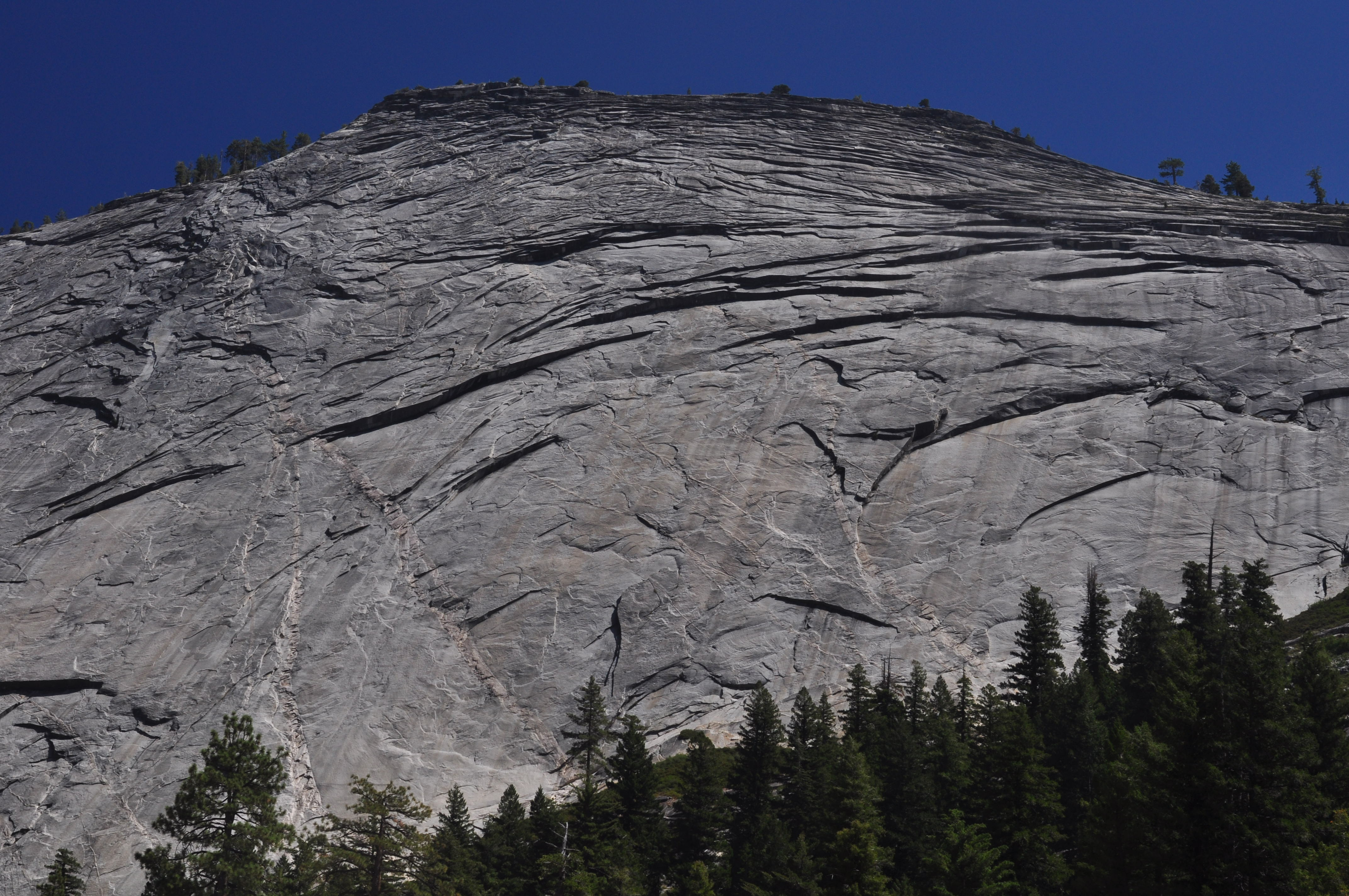
Westward facing Bunnell Point Cliff from Little Yosemite Valley

Bunnell Point is a granite dome summit in Mariposa County, California. Bunnell Point rises to 8,173 ft (2,491 m) AMSL. Bunnell Point is located at 37°44′19.73″N 119°28′2.57″W comprising the southeast margin of Little Yosemite Valley.

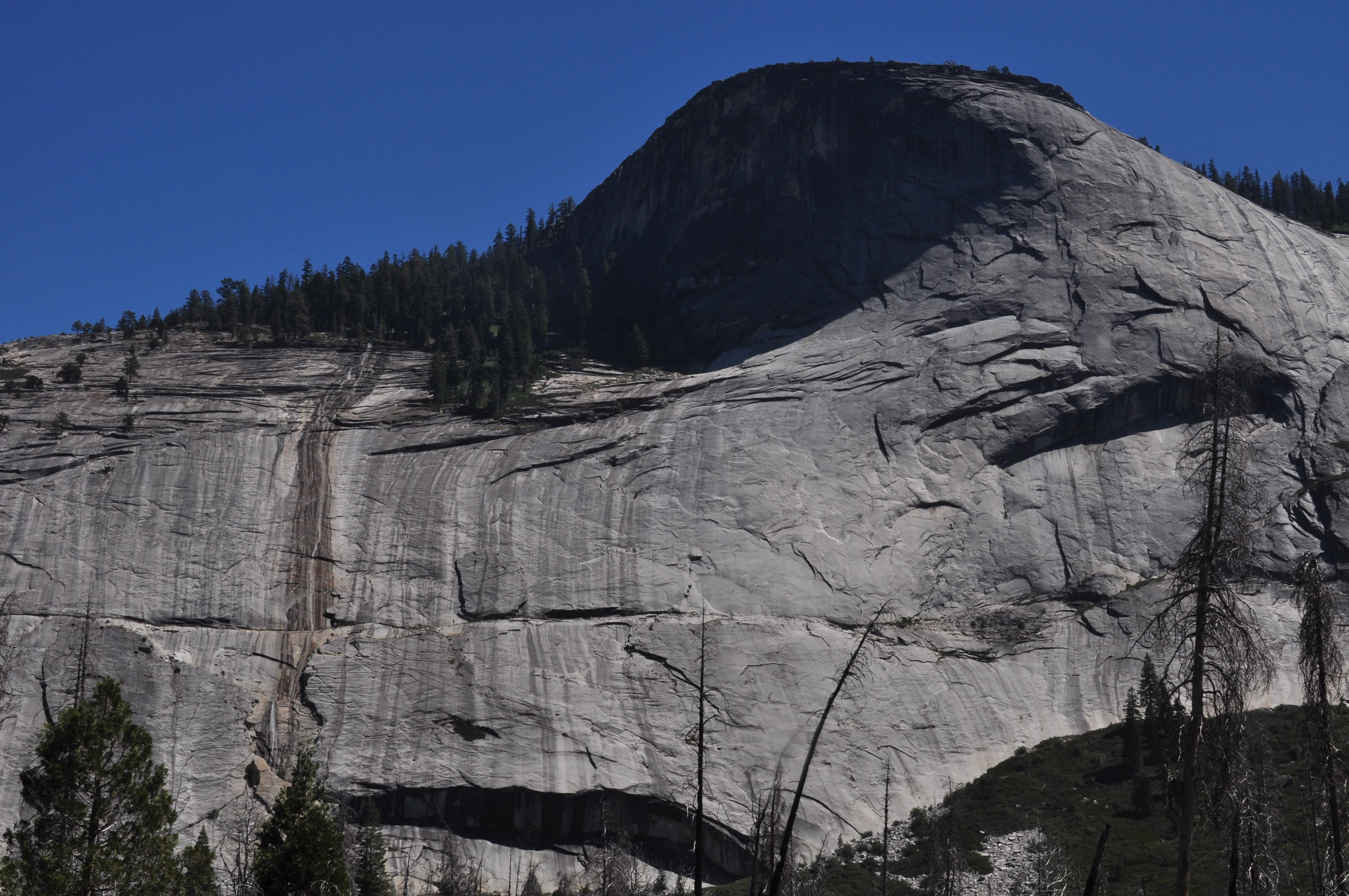
Cascade Cliffs from Little Yosemite Valley

=== Cascade Cliffs ===
Cascade Cliffs is a wall of unjointed granite that rises to 8,170 ft (2,490 m) AMSL, 1,930 ft (588 m) above the Merced River and make up the southern wall of Little Yosemite Valley at 37°43′27.73″N 119°29′13.56″W, 1.6 mi (3 km) southwest of Bunnell Point and 2.4 mi (4 km) northeast of Mount Starr King, of which Cascade Cliffs comprises the northern flank. In few other places in the Yosemite region is the granite more continuously massive than in the Cascade Cliffs. Only one horizontal master joint divides the rock (in the lower left) The scales on the cliffs are merely surficial features due to exfoliation. The dark streaks indicate the paths followed by the ribbon cascades which descend from the upland in the spring, when the snow is melting, and from which the cliffs take their name. There are two wide, relatively short yet quite deep arches at the bottom of the cliff.

=== The Quarter Domes ===
The Quarter Domes are granodiorite domes rising between Half Dome and Clouds Rest. They comprise two domes, West Quarter Dome and East Quarter Dome. The higher of the two is East Quarter Dome, at 8,318 feet (2,535 m); West Quarter Dome stands at 8,160 feet (2,490 m).

== Facilities ==
=== Trail ===
The Merced River enters Little Yosemite Valley at 6,185 ft (1,885 m) at the pool at the base of the cascade and leaves the valley at 5,907 ft (1,800 m) for a total elevation difference of 278 ft (85 m) over a trail length of 3.25 mi (5 km).

The trail is largely forested, with two notable areas of exposure, the first .1 mi (0 km) on the approach to the southwest buttress of Moraine Dome and the second, .25 mi (0 km) of burned forest, at approximately 2.3 mi (4 km) above Nevada Fall, across from Cascade Cliffs.

=== Campground ===
The hike-in campground here is a little under 4 miles (6.5 km) from the trailhead in Yosemite Valley and about 3.5 miles (5.5 km) from the summit of Half Dome at 37°43′57.43″N 119°30′51.68″W. Fires are allowed in the two communal campfire rings just outside the campground. Potable (drinking) water is not available at the campground. River water is available nearby, at the Merced River. The river is the only water source for the area. Little Yosemite Valley Ranger Station is staffed during summer. A composting toilet is available for use near the campground 37°44′0.45″N 119°30′55.99″W The Park Service provides communal food lockers at the campground in which to store food, toiletries, and trash safe from abundant hungry black bears that frequent Little Yosemite.
