= Three Chute Falls =

Coordinates: 37.75886°N 119.53666°W

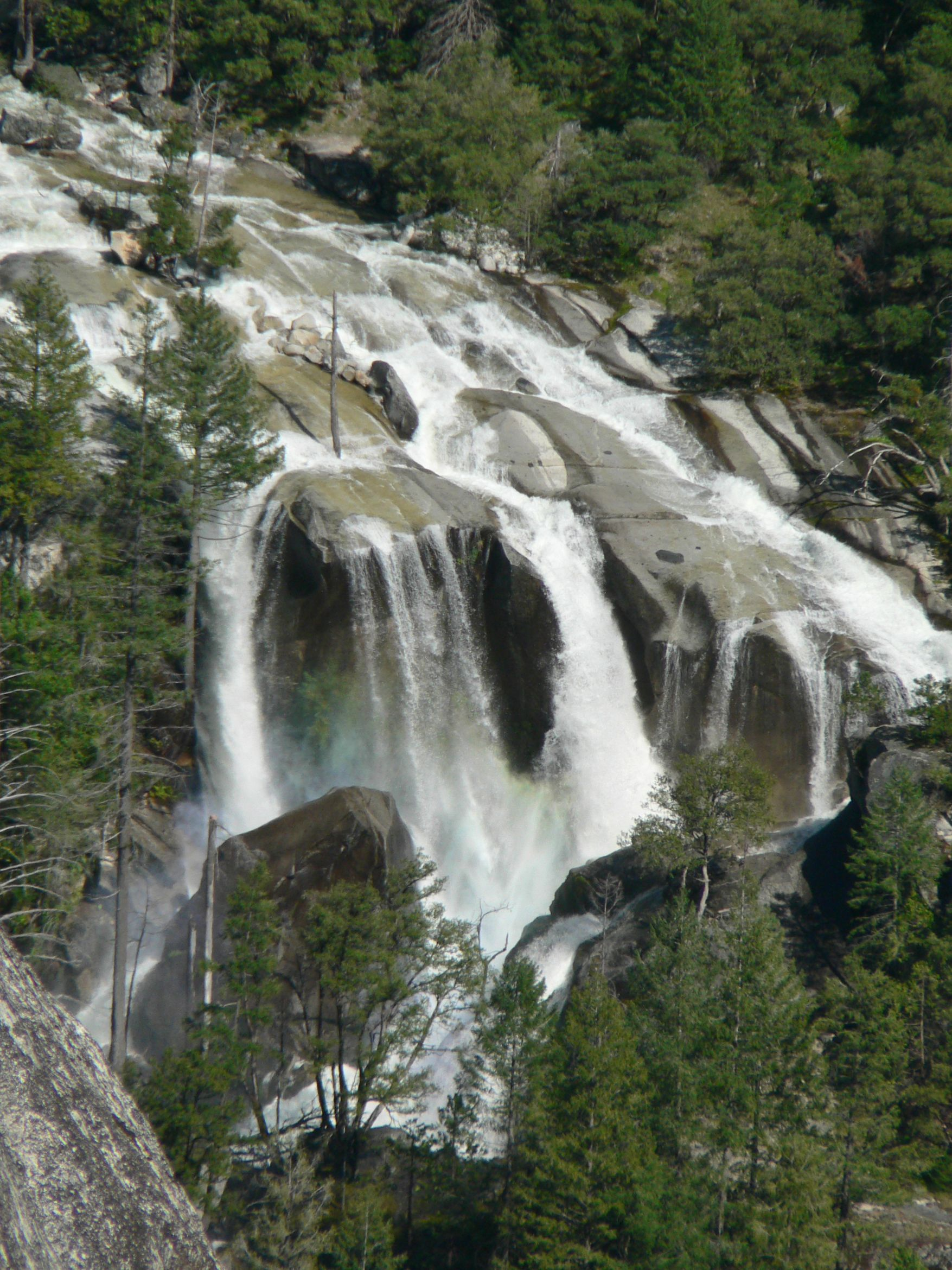
Three Chute Falls, in lower Tenaya Canyon.

Three Chute Falls (also known as Hidden Falls or Tenaya Creek Falls) is a waterfall on Tenaya Creek in Yosemite National Park, in the U.S. state of California.

The waterfall is located in lower Tenaya Canyon, around a half mile upstream from Mirror Lake. The name is from the three distinct "chutes" that the creek splits into upon flowing onto a slab of granite atop the falls, after which it plunges about 80 feet (24 m) into a congregation of boulders.

== Access ==
The falls are easily reached by proceeding upstream along the Mirror Lake Trail. They are relatively obscure, and the trail requires some scrambling.

Further upstream is the much larger, 600-foot (180 m) Pywiack Cascade of Tenaya Creek.

== See also ==
- List of waterfalls
- List of waterfalls in California
