= West Quarter Dome =

Granite dome in Yosemite National Park, USA

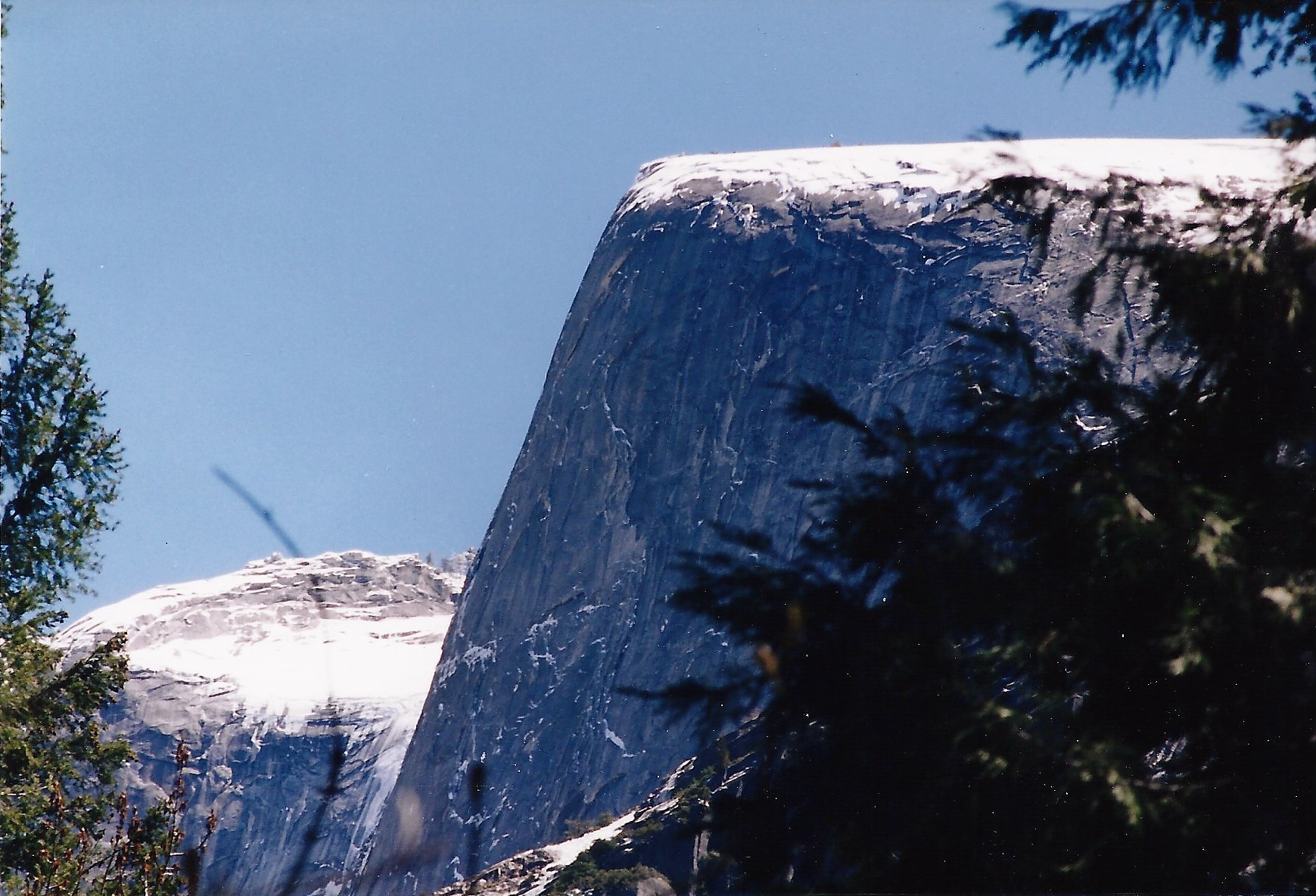
- One of the Quarter Domes dusted in snow

Highest point
- Elevation: 8,160 ft (2,490 m) NAVD 88
- Prominence: 40 ft (12 m)
- Coordinates: 37°45′28″N 119°30′39″W

Geography
- Location within California Location within the United States
- Location: Yosemite National Park, Mariposa County, California, U.S.
- Parent range: Ritter Range, Sierra Nevada

West Quarter Dome is a granodiorite dome, in the Tenaya Canyon area of Yosemite National Park. It is composed of Half Dome Granodiorite.

There are two domes, West Quarter Dome and East Quarter Dome, and they are right next to each other.

Ansel Adams took a photo, Glacial Erratic on East Quarter Dome Showing Half Dome in Background, on East Quarter Dome.

== On the locale, and rock climbing ==
The Quarter Domes are a bit up Tenaya Canyon, are across from Half Dome and Clouds Rest, thus are above Yosemite Valley, quite near to Little Yosemite Valley.

The Quarter Domes offer rock climbing routes, though the approach is difficult. One well-known route is The North Face, which Yvon Chouinard and Tom Frost first climbed in 1962.
