= Glacier Point =

Viewpoint above Yosemite Valley, in California, USA

Coordinates: 37.7304°N 119.5736°W

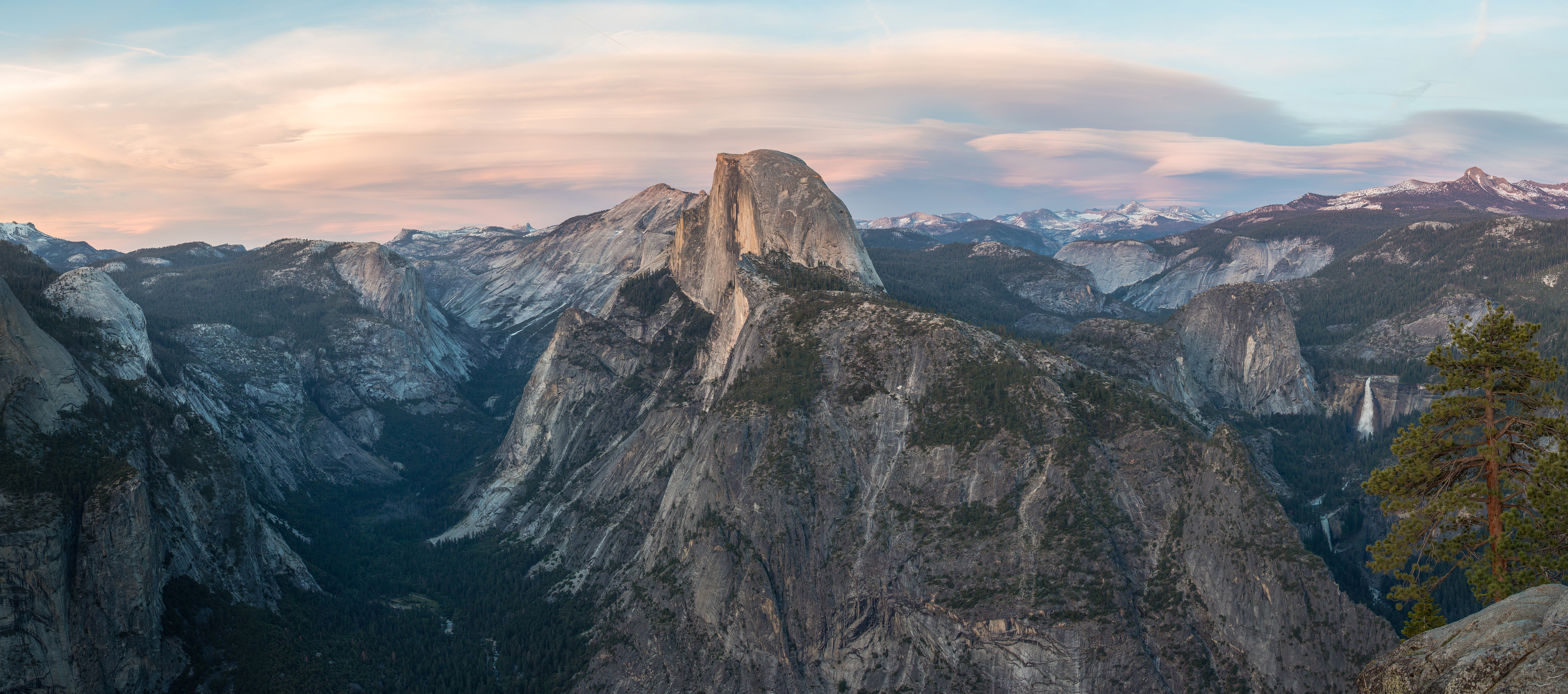
The view from Glacier Point, left to right: Tenaya Canyon, Half Dome, Liberty Cap, Little Yosemite Valley, Vernal Fall and Nevada Fall.

Glacier Point is a viewpoint above Yosemite Valley in the U.S. state of California. It is located on the south wall of Yosemite Valley at an elevation of 7,214 feet (2,199 m), 3,200 feet (980 m) above Curry Village. The point offers a superb view of several of Yosemite National Park's well-known landmarks, including Yosemite Valley, Yosemite Falls, Half Dome, Vernal Fall, Nevada Fall, and Clouds Rest. Between 1872 and 1968, it was the site of the Yosemite Firefall.

== Geology ==
The extreme point of the promontory of Glacier Point is wholly bare, but on the slopes below, in the hollow to the west, and on the wooded slope above, glacial material is abundant. Its glacial origin is definitely proved by the presence in it of rocks derived from Little Yosemite Valley and the Sierra Nevada.

There are three types of glacially-deposited rock at Glacier Point:

1. Most plentiful are rounded boulders and cobbles and angular fragments, all deeply weathered, of Half Dome quartz monzonite, the light-colored granite of which not only Half Dome, but all of the Little Yosemite and its surrounding heights are composed.
2. There are also a few boulders of a coarse-grained, highly siliceous granite, light buff in general tone when fresh but vivid rose when weathered. There is only one place in the High Sierra above the Yosemite from which they can be derived: Mount Clark, the sharp-profiled peak which stands on the east side of the Illilouette Basin, 8 miles (13 km) from Glacier Point.
3. Finally, there are fragments of yellowish quartzite and gray schist whose places of origin have been located on the long northern spur of Mount Clark.

Native Americans reportedly used Glacier Point's overhanging rock as a lookout, calling it "Patill-ima," though its meaning is unknown.

== History ==
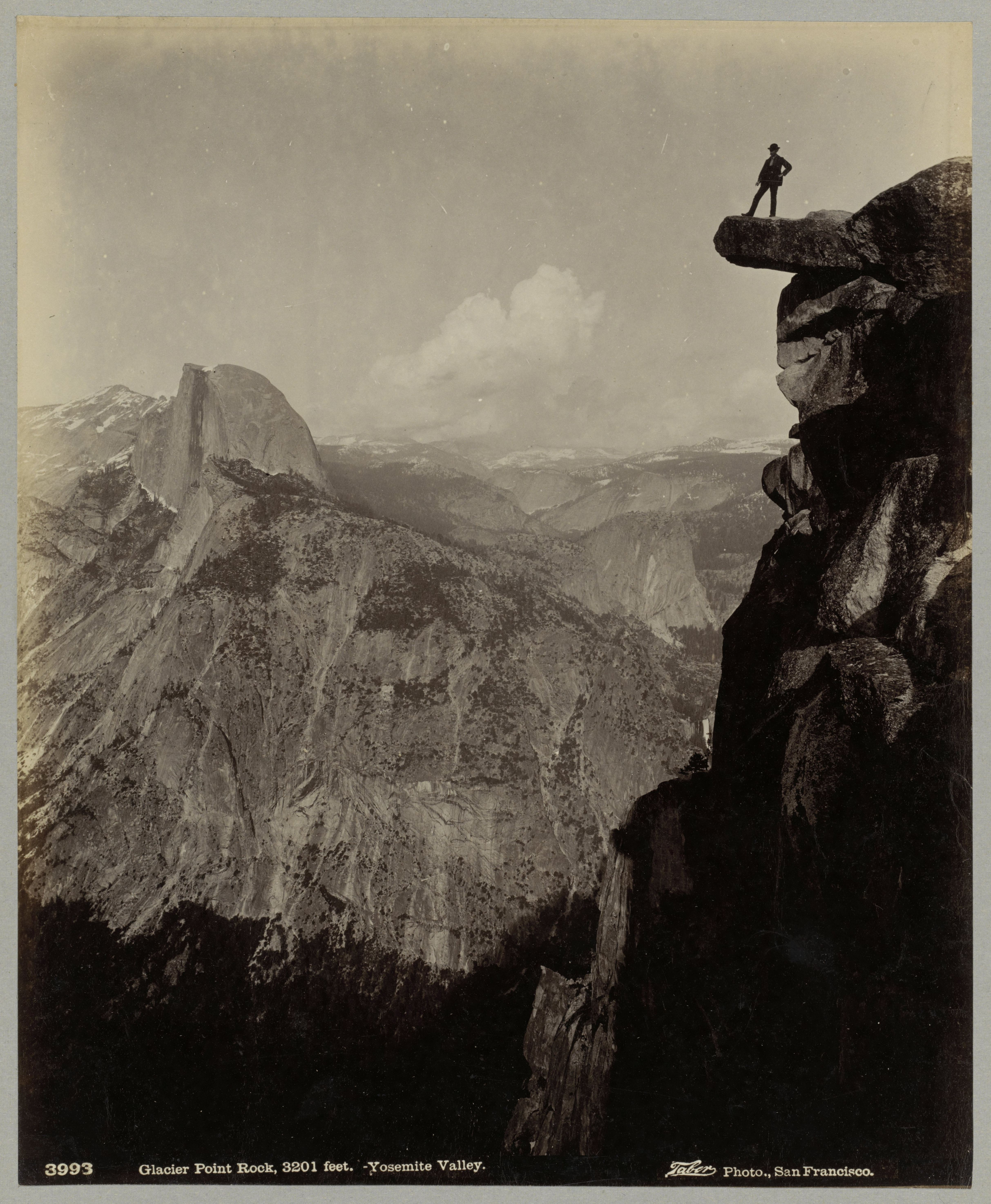
Glacier Point overlook, late 1800s.

In the late 1800s, the first formal trail to Glacier Point was constructed. This steep, rugged path became known as the Four Mile Trail, which was completed in 1872, allowing visitors to hike to the summit for sweeping views of Yosemite Valley.

In 1882, the Yosemite Stage and Turnpike Company was granted permission to build a stage road to the summit, offering a less strenuous, though longer, route for horse-drawn vehicles.

By the early 1900s, the road was improved for automobiles, allowing easier access for visitors with a direct, drivable route to the point. The federal government took control of the road in 1917, the same year the Glacier Point Hotel opened.

== Access ==
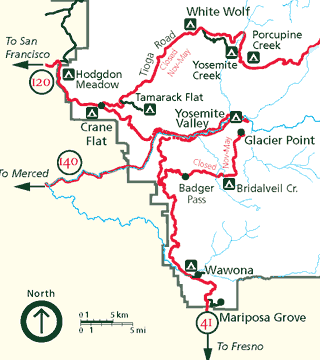
Location of Glacier Point within Yosemite

Glacier Point can be reached from the Valley via Glacier Point Road. During the summer, Glacier Point is often crowded with tourists. Tours by bus are also available and take about four hours. The road is usually open from June through October. In winter, Glacier Point Road closes due to snow, and access to Glacier Point from the Badger Pass Ski Area is only by ski or snowshoe.

Glacier Point can also be reached via the Four Mile Trail, which ascends the 3,200 feet (980 m) in 4.6 miles (7.4 km). This moderate to strenuous trail can provide access to Glacier Point when the Glacier Point Road is closed. Note, however, that the trail can be extremely hazardous when covered with snow or ice, so it is usually closed by the Park Service from December through May. Another 8.2 miles (13.2 km) trail runs from Glacier Point down to the Valley, via the Panorama Trail, past Nevada and Vernal Falls.

Hikers may also access trailheads to the Panorama trail and the Pohono trail.

In 2020, the National Park Service announced major road works on Glacier Point Road in 2022. Due to this work, Glacier Point Road will be closed for the entire season in 2022. Glacier Point will only be accessible by foot during this year. There will also be road works in 2023, but only delays are predicted for this work.

== See also ==
- Glacier Point Hotel
- Four Mile Trail
- Yosemite Firefall
- Yosemite Valley
- Olmsted Point
