= Harlequin Dome =

Granite dome in Yosemite National Park, USA

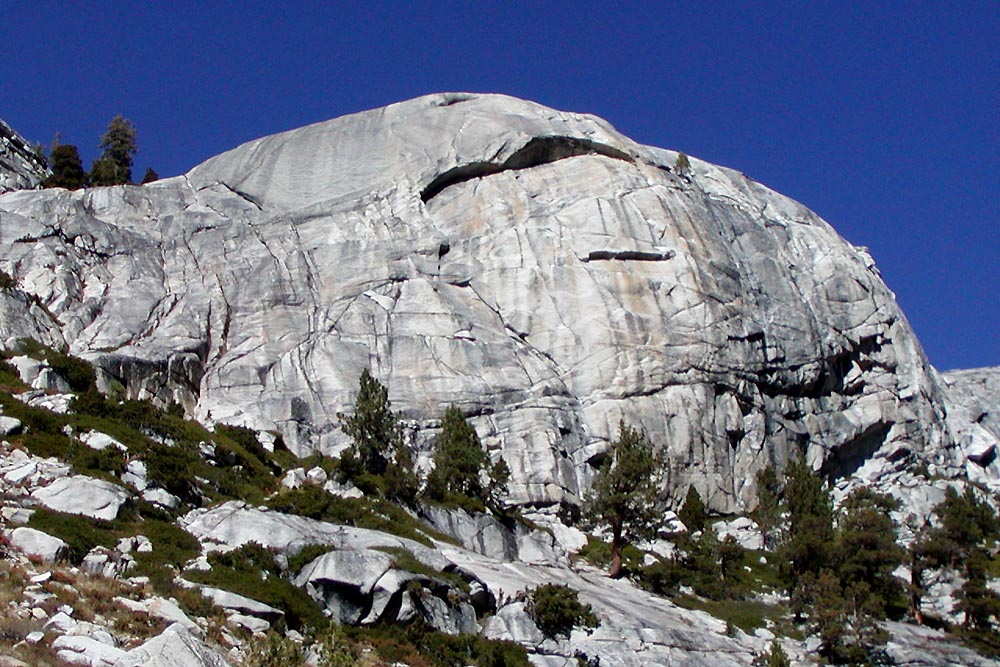
- Harlequin Dome

Highest point
- Elevation: 8,891 ft (2,710 m)
- Coordinates: 37.84009°N 119.45521°W

Geography
- Location: Yosemite National Park, U.S.
- Parent range: Sierra Nevada

Harlequin Dome is a granite dome, quite near Tenaya Lake, in the Tuolumne Meadows region of Yosemite National Park.

== Finding Harlequin Dome ==
From the parking lot at Tenaya Lake, cross Highway 120, hike up slabs to a short headwall. Continue up the trail to the base of the cliff.

Harlequin Dome is directly across from Pywiack Dome.

== Rock climbing ==
Harlequin Dome is south-facing, thus warm, and is also steep. It has one-to-three pitch climbs, but the climbs wander a bit, and the approach is easier.
