= Echo Valley =

Echo Valley may refer to:

== Locations ==
Canada

- Echo Valley, British Columbia, an area in the Cariboo Region
- Echo Valley Airport, a private landing strip for Echo Valley Ranch & Spa, British Columbia
- Echo Valley Conference Centre, Fort San, Saskatchewan
- Echo Valley Provincial Park, Saskatchewan

Denmark

- Echo Valley (Bornholm) or Ekkodalen, Denmark's longest rift

Philippines

- Echo Valley, an area of Sagada, Mountain Province

United States

- Echo Valley (California), a valley in Yosemite National Park
- Echo Valley Ski Area, near Chelan, Washington

== Entertainment ==
- Echo Valley (film), written by Brad Ingelsby and directed by Michael Pearce
