= Olmsted Point =

Coordinates: 37°48.64′N 119°29.11′W

Olmsted Point is a viewing area off Tioga Pass Road in Yosemite National Park which offers a view south into Tenaya Canyon, giving, in particular, a view of the northern side of Half Dome, Clouds Rest, and a view of Tenaya Lake to the east. The granite slopes immediately south and southwest of the parking lot feature numerous glacial erratics scattered about, as well as a short 0.125 mi (0.2 km) trail leading south - through a small grove of trees - to the top of a small granite dome where the view of Clouds Rest and Half Dome is clearest.

The site is named after landscape architects Frederick Law Olmsted and Frederick Law Olmsted Jr.

== Gallery ==
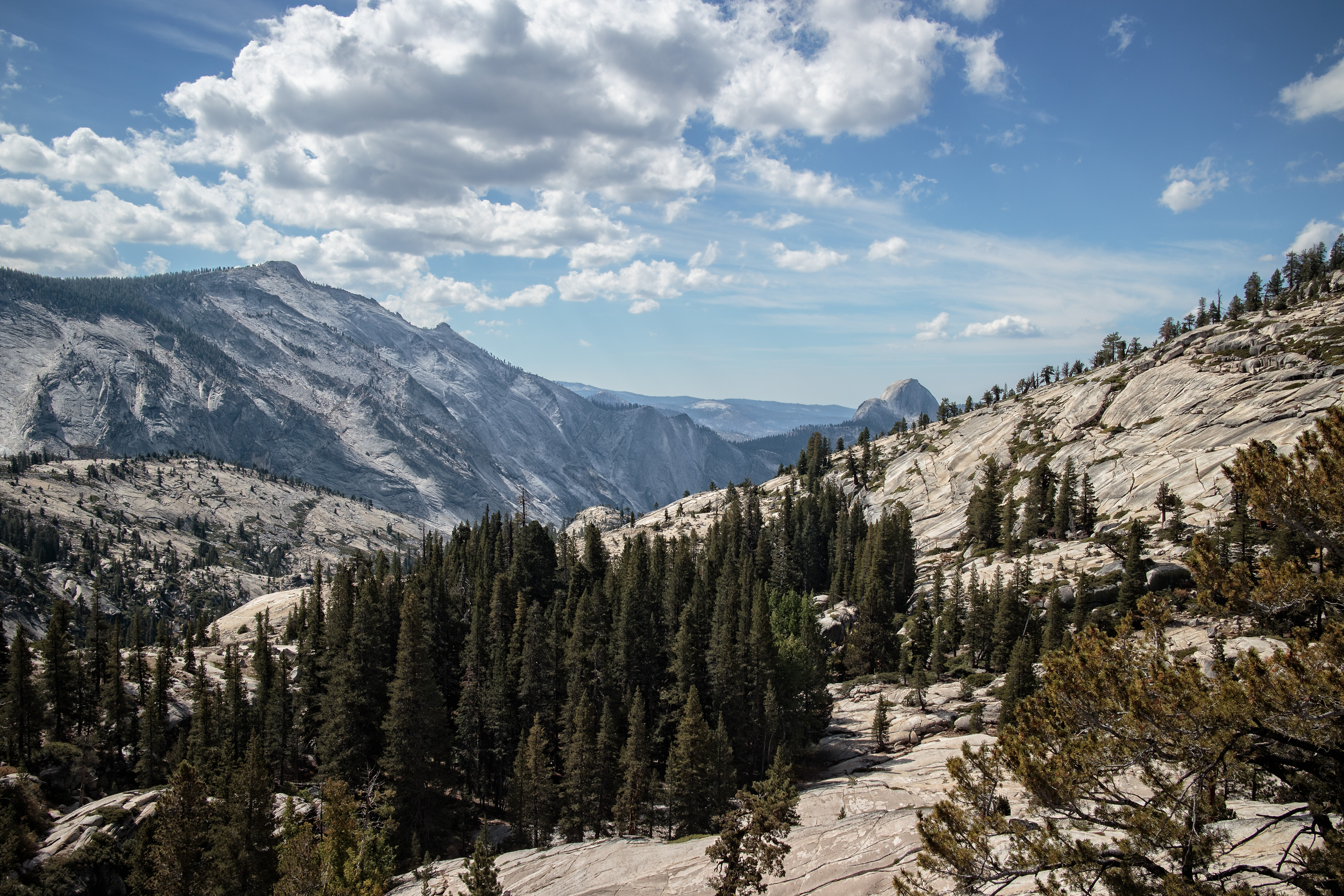
Clouds Rest is on the left, Half Dome is on the right (in the distance). Tenaya Canyon is partially visible between them.

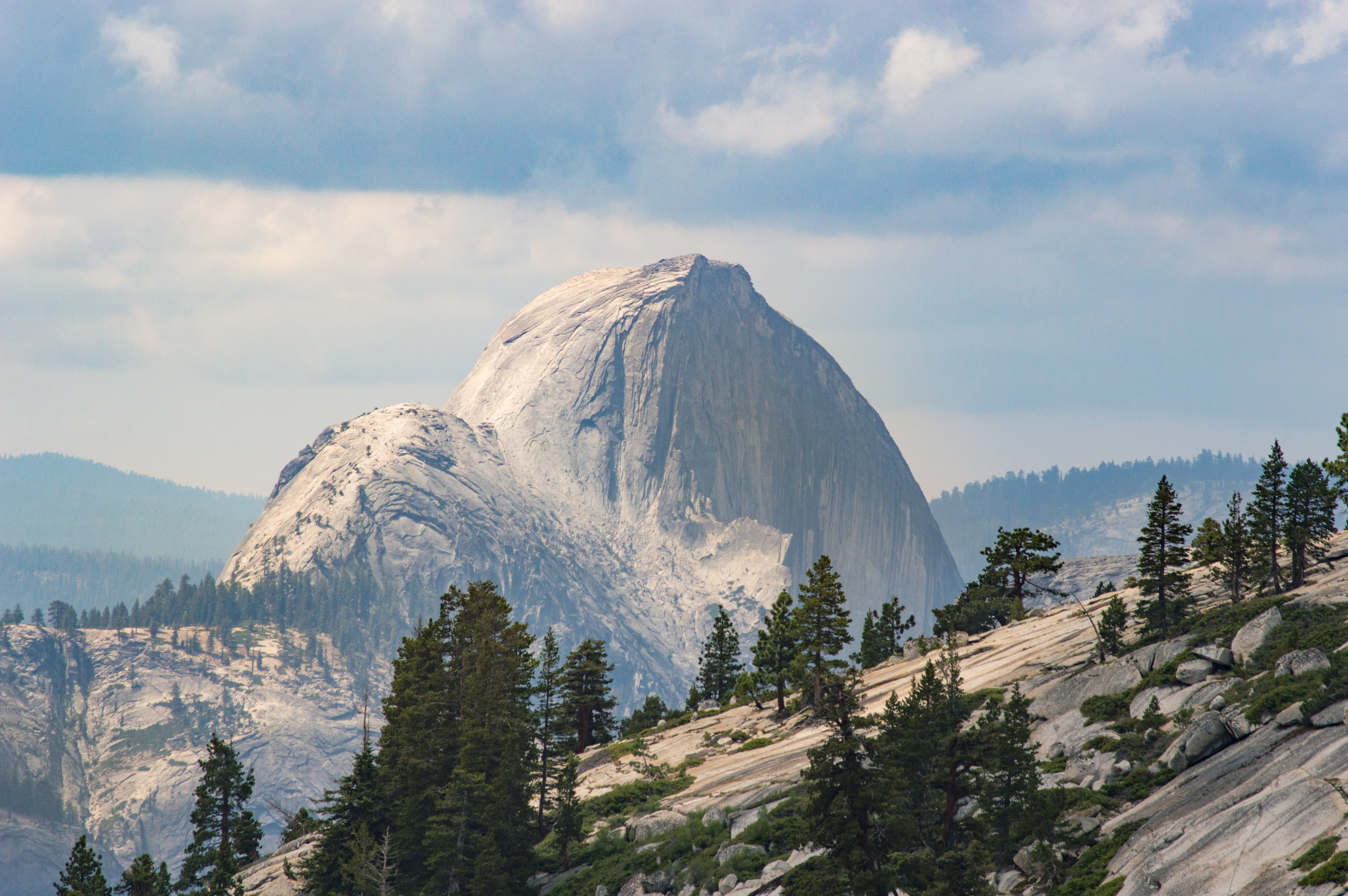
Overlooking the north side of Half Dome from Olmsted Point.

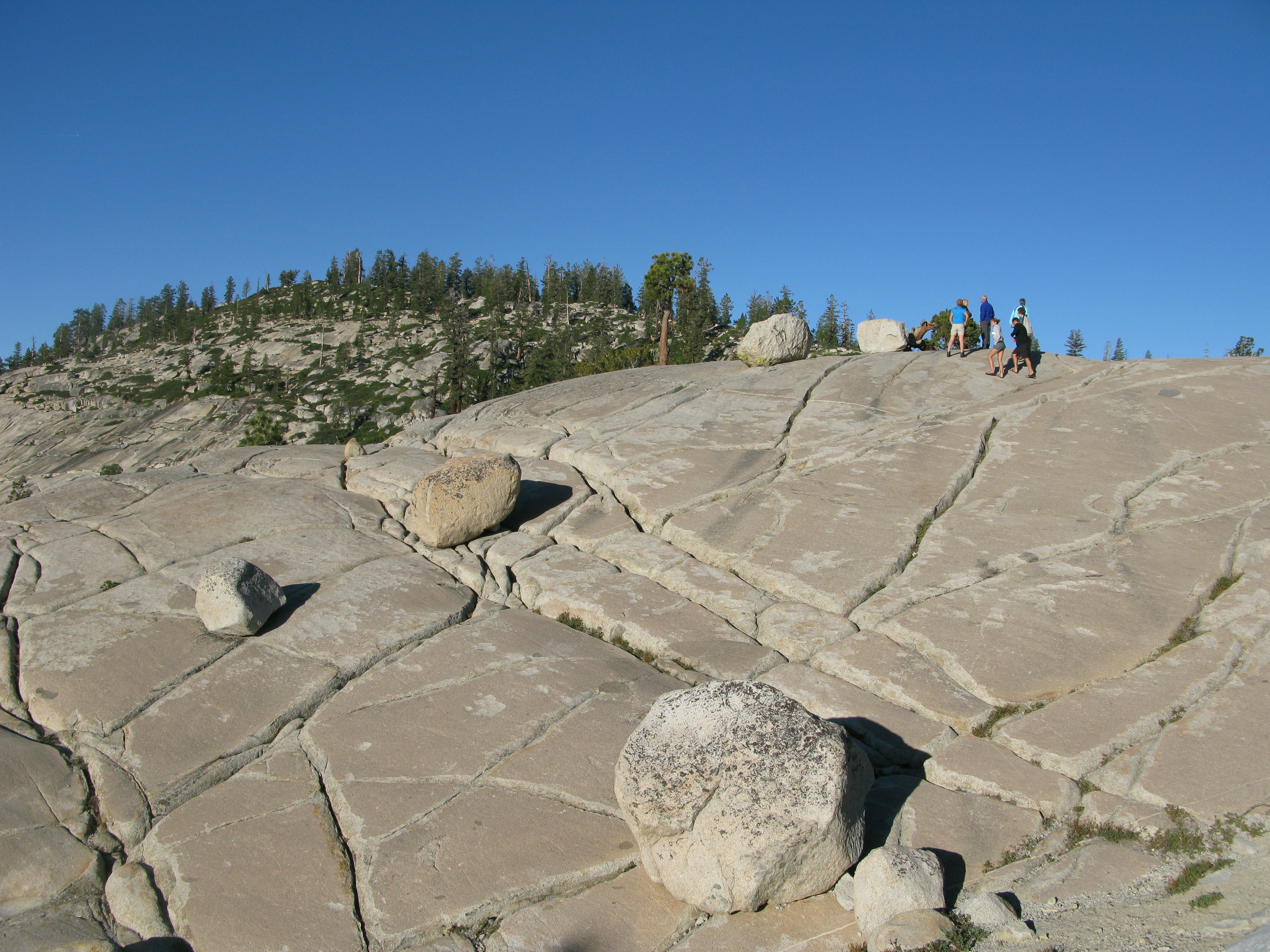
Glacial erratics dot the granite slopes immediately south of the vista point.

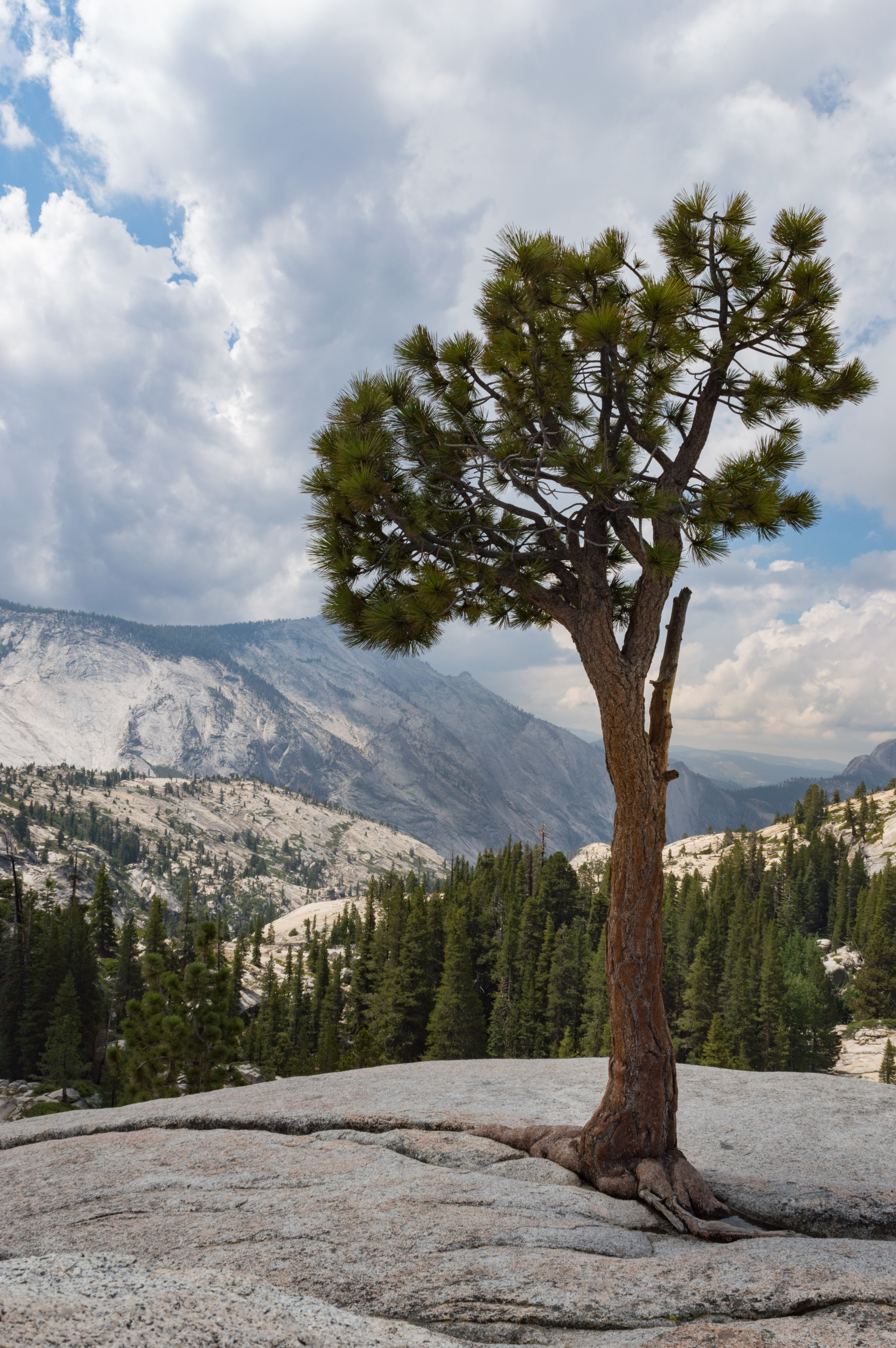
A popularly photographed tree.

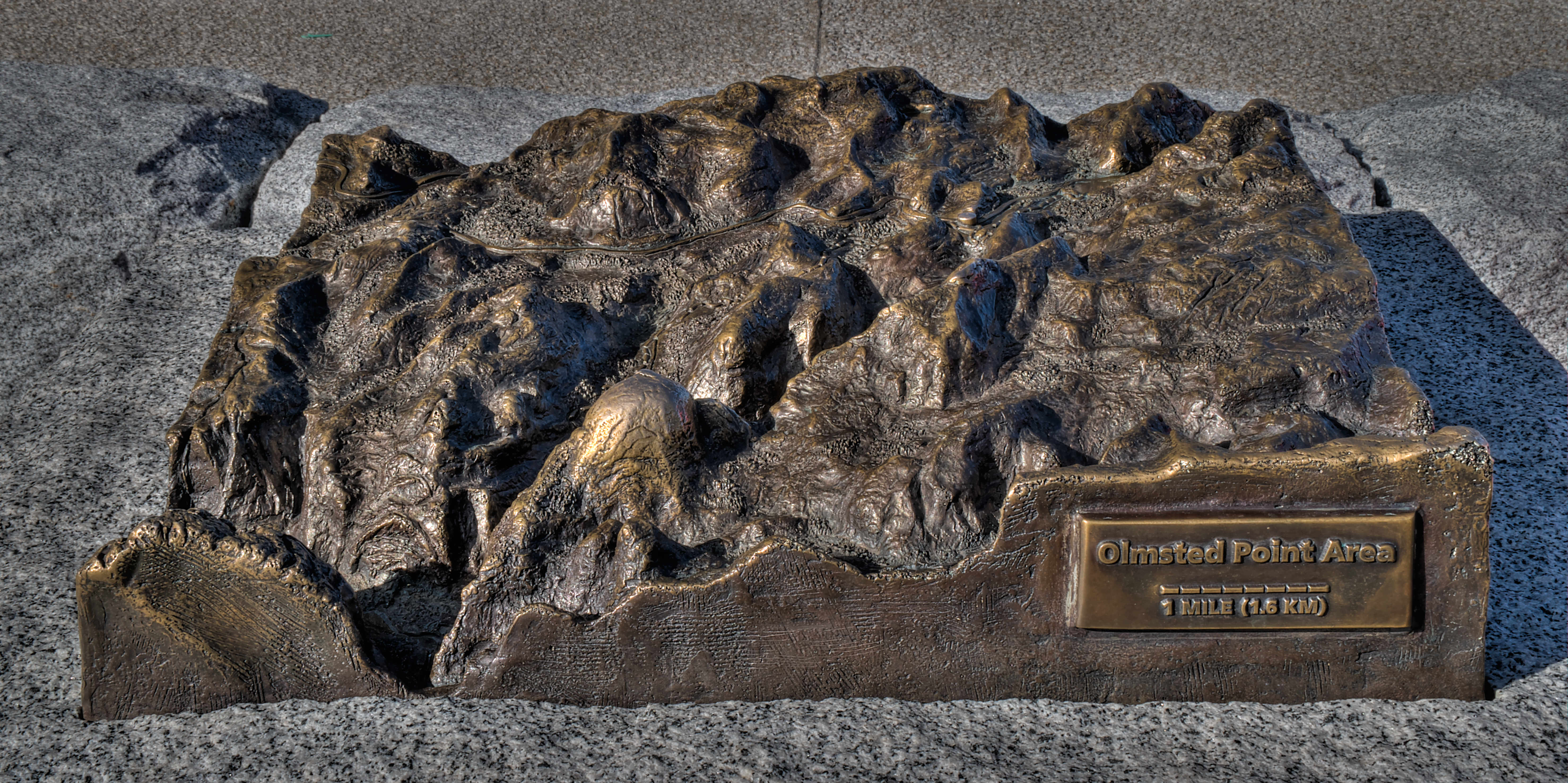
Bronze relief map of Tenaya Canyon.

== See also ==
- Glacier Point - another popular viewing area of Yosemite National Park, located atop the southern wall of Yosemite Valley.
