= Four Mile Trail =

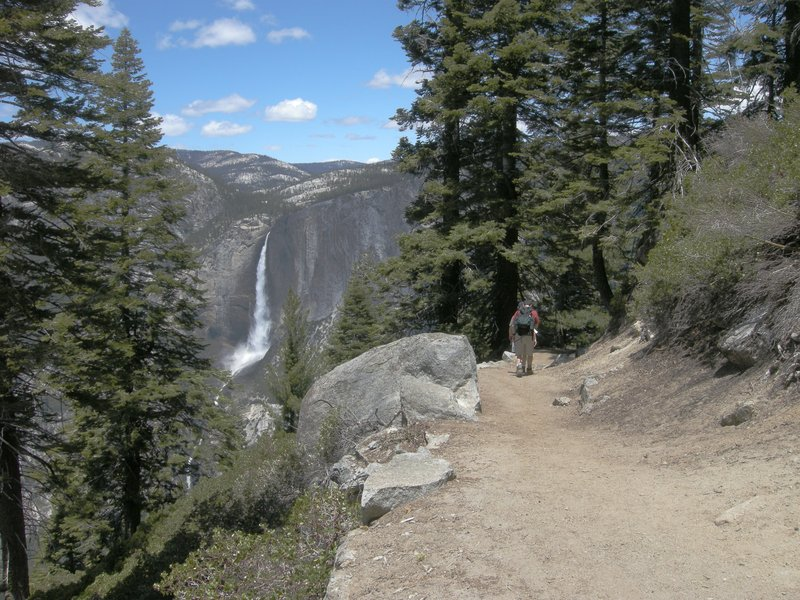
- A section of the Four Mile Trail with view of Yosemite Falls
- Length: 4.8 miles (7.7 km)
- Completed: 1872
- Trailheads: Yosemite Valley, 37°44′02″N 119°36′07″W; Glacier Point, 37°43′43″N 119°34′26″W
- Elevation change: 3,200 feet (1,000 m)

Four Mile Trail is a moderate to strenuous trail leading from Yosemite Valley to Glacier Point. The trail begins at the valley floor west of the Swinging Bridge recreation area, and climbs the south side 4.8 miles (7.7 km) up to Glacier Point, an elevation change of 3,200 feet (1,000 m).

Four Mile Trail was originally constructed in 1872 and was 4 miles (6.4 km) in length. In the early 1900s the trail was reconstructed and lengthened to 4.8 miles (7.7 km), yet the original name remained. This trail is remarkable because it offers views of most of the Yosemite Valley landmarks. The trail begins at the base of the Sentinel Rock. The first four miles are full of grand views of El Capitan and Yosemite Falls, as well as the Merced River as it runs through the valley. The second half of the trail provides several good views of Half Dome and Tenaya Canyon.

The trail becomes dangerous in winter conditions and is closed December through May, and the upper quarter of the trail (about a mile walk to the Glacier Point) remains extremely hazardous and is usually closed through May. There is no potable water along the trail.
