= Pywiack Dome =

Granite dome in Yosemite National Park, USA

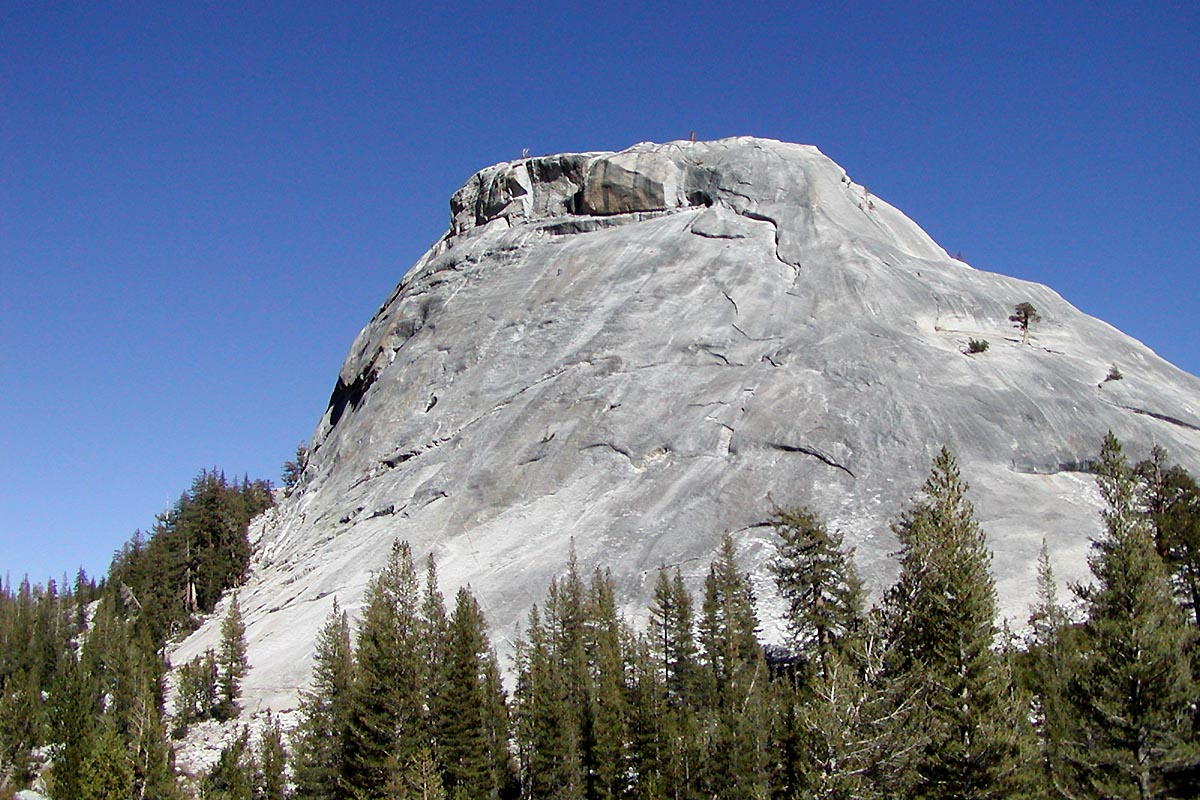

Highest point
- Elevation: 8,819 ft (2,688 m) NAVD 88
- Prominence: 251 ft (77 m)
- Coordinates: 37°50′47″N 119°26′35″W

Geography
- Location within California Location within the United States
- Location: Yosemite National Park, Mariposa County, California, U.S.
- Parent range: Sierra Nevada
- Topo map: USGS Tenaya Lake

Pywiack Dome is a prominent 600 foot granite dome in Yosemite National Park, located 0.7 miles (1.1 km) north-east of Tenaya Lake, 4 miles (6.4 km) west of Tuolumne Meadows and 200 feet (61.0 m) from the Tioga Road. It is quite near Harlequin Dome, and North and South Whizz Domes are north.

Josiah Whitney the head of California Geological Survey wrote in 1863 about Pywiack Dome in Geology:

At the head of Lake Tenaya is a very conspicuous conical knob of bare granite, about 800 feet high, the sides of which are everywhere finely polished and grooved by former glaciers.

== Climbing ==
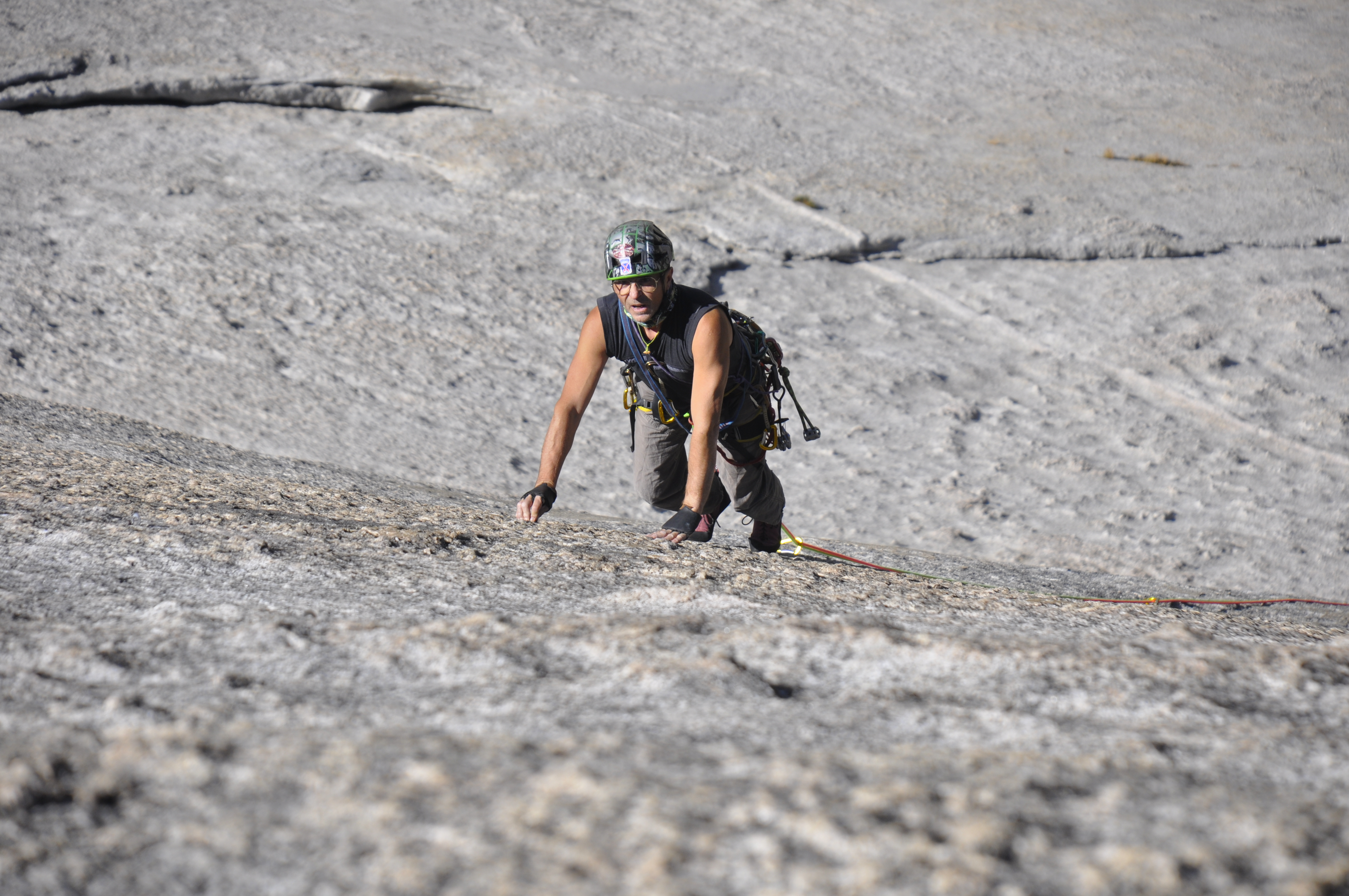
Climber on Zee Tree.

The west face of the formation is popular with rock climbers and has several multi-pitch slab climbs easily visible from the Tioga Road. Earliest was Dike Route a 6 pitch YDS 5.9R first climbed in August 1966 by Tom Gerughty, Roger Evje and Dave Meeks. Other popular climbs include Zee Tree (a 5 pitch YDS 5.7) and Aqua Knobby (a 4 pitch YDS 5.9)

== Etymology ==
"Py-we-ack" in the native language means "glistening rocks", and the native people applied it to both the Tenaya Creek and Tenaya Lake, due to the abundance of glacial polish in the upper Tenaya basin. In 1932 the name "Pywiack" has applied to Pywiack Cascade. Pywiack Dome was known early by various names, including Murphy's Dome, Teapot Dome, Matthes Dome, Ten-ieya Dome, and Turtle Rock. The name Pywiack Dome was recommended by David Brower in the early 1950s, and first appeared on the 1956 15-minute quadrangle map.

== Views ==
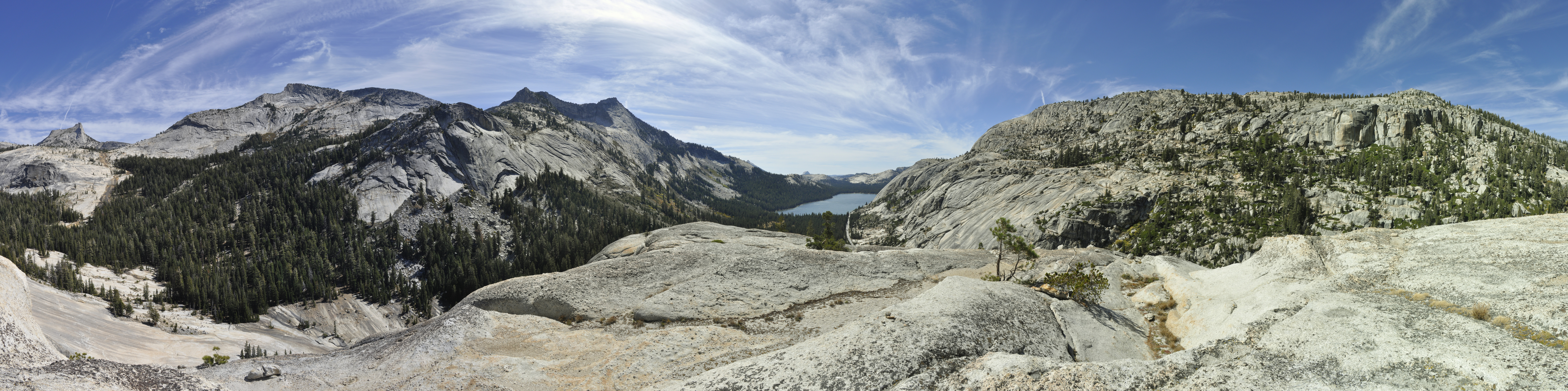
South west panorama

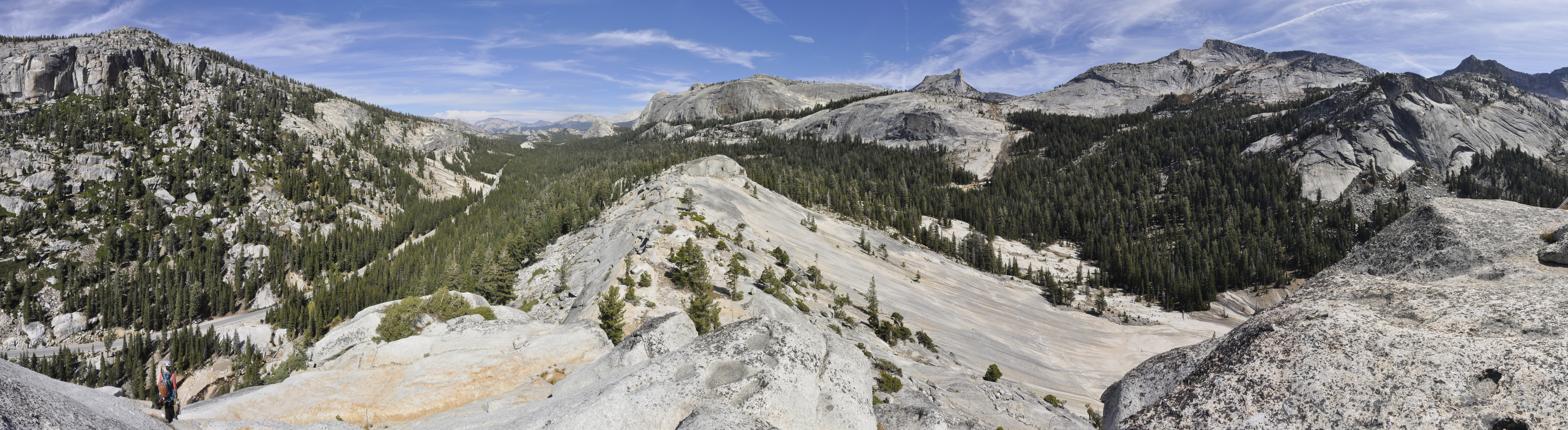
North east panorama
