= Cyclopean stairs =

Longitudinal profile of a glaciated valley that has several consecutive hanging valleys

Cyclopean stairs form as a result of glacial erosion. The term refers to the longitudinal profile of a glaciated valley that has several consecutive hanging valleys.

== Formation ==
There are a few different ways cyclopean stairs can form.

One way they form is through plucking. Different bedrock types may be more susceptible to plucking. If a highly jointed layer of bedrock is on the surface, large portions of it will be picked up by the glacier and deposited later as a glacial erratic. The valley formed in this fashion may have a steep wall at its head caused by a change in the bedrock type. The stronger bedrock will remain in the form of a riser at the end of a hanging valley.

Cyclopean stairs can also form at points where tributary glaciers feed into larger central glaciers. The tributary glacier causes the central glacier to thicken and downcut more rapidly. This may cause a very sudden drop in the valley floor at the points where the glaciers converged.

They may also form at the head of a glacier. In an area where the snowline is rising, the cirque in which the glacier forms may recede. A new cirque may form above the previous cirque and carve out a new step. As the snowline continues to rise, new cirques would continue to form the steps of the cyclopean stairs.
