= Mirror Lake (California) =

Small, seasonal lake in Yosemite National Park, USA

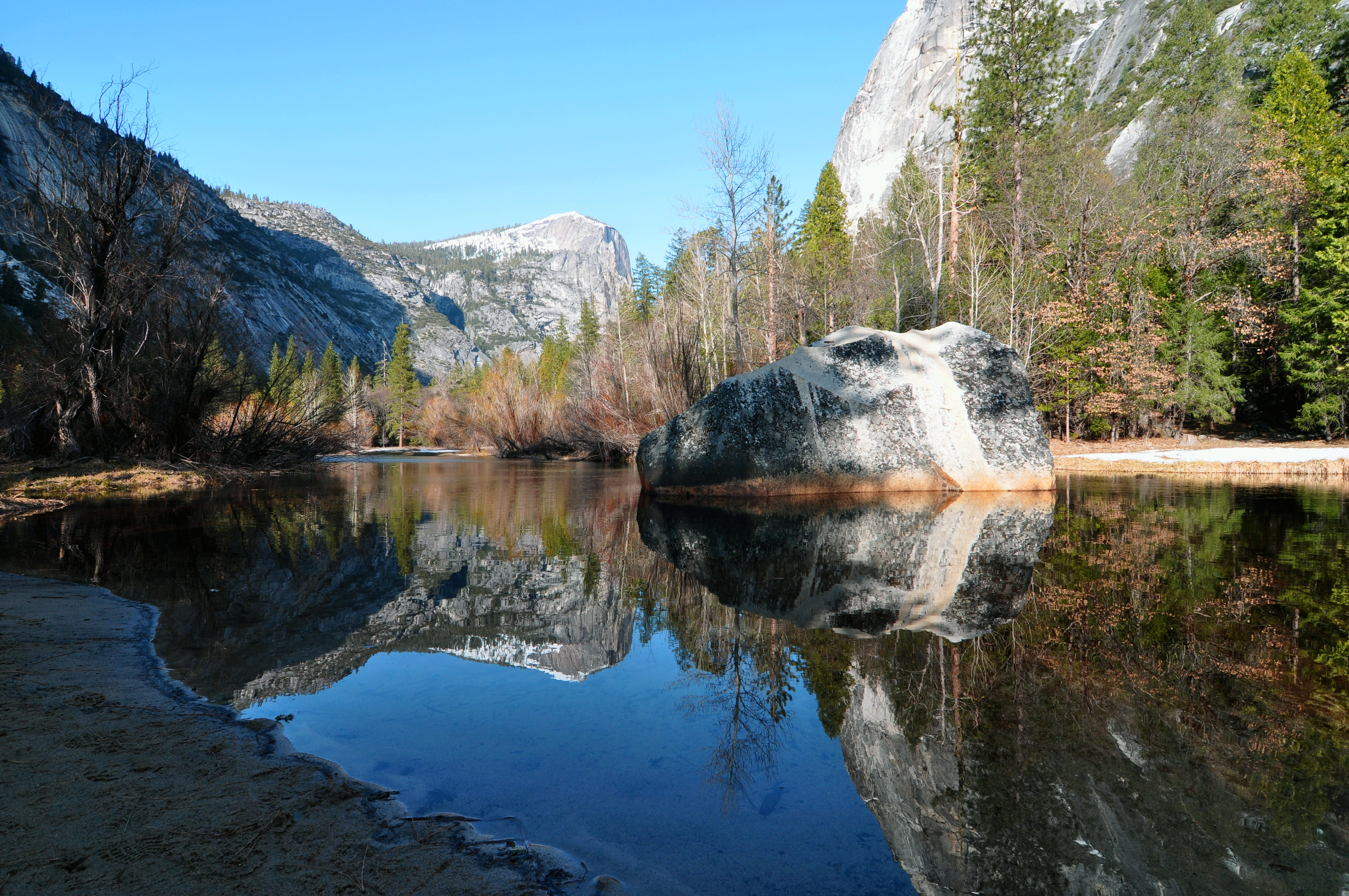
- Mirror Lake, March 2010

- Location within California
- Interactive map of Mirror Lake
- Location: Yosemite National Park, Mariposa County, California, United States
- Coordinates: 37.7485°N 119.5491°W
- Primary inflows: Tenaya Creek
- Primary outflows: Tenaya Creek
- Basin countries: United States
- Surface elevation: 4,098 ft (1,249 m)

Mirror Lake is a small, seasonal lake located on Tenaya Creek in Yosemite National Park. Situated in Tenaya Canyon directly between North Dome and Half Dome, it is the last remnant of a large glacial lake that once filled most of Yosemite Valley at the end of the last Ice Age, and is close to disappearing due to sediment accumulation.

== See also ==
- List of lakes in California
