= Tenaya Lake =

Alpine lake in Yosemite National Park, California, United States

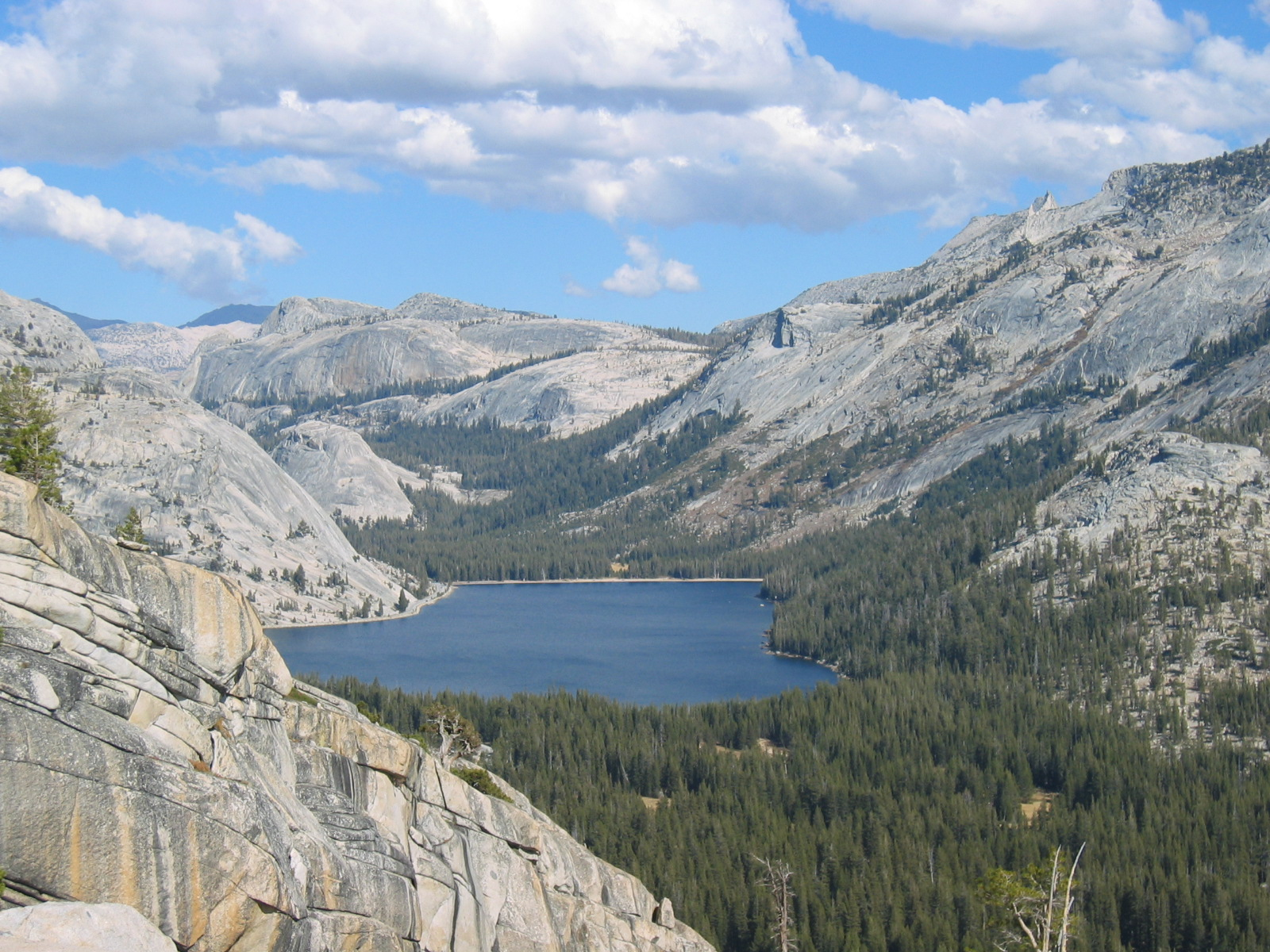
- Tenaya Lake as seen from a hill northwest of the lake

- Location within California Location within the United States
- Location: Yosemite National Park, Mariposa County, California, US
- Coordinates: 37.8308°N 119.4583°W
- Primary outflows: Tenaya Creek
- Basin countries: United States
- Surface elevation: 8,150 feet (2,484 m)

Tenaya Lake is an alpine lake in Yosemite National Park, located between Yosemite Valley and Tuolumne Meadows. The surface of Tenaya Lake has an elevation of 8,150 feet (2,484 m). The lake basin was formed by glacial action, which left a backdrop of light granite rocks, whose beauty was known to the Native Americans. Today, Tenaya Lake is easily accessible by State Route 120 and is a popular lake for water activities.

== History ==
Tenaya Lake is named after Chief Tenaya, who was the chief of the native people who lived in Yosemite Valley before being driven out by the Mariposa Battalion. When told that the lake was named in his honor, Tenaya pointed at the "Glistening peaks, near the head of the lake, said: 'It already has a name; we call it Py-we-ack.'" To which Lafayette H. Bunnell of the militia told him, "that we had named it Ten-ie-ya, because it was upon the shores of the lake that we had found his people, who would never return to it to live,...." This original name is now attached to Pywiack Dome, a granite dome to the east of the lake.

As part of the 1864 Yosemite grant, the area became the first park land to be federally protected for preservation and public use. Yosemite became a national park in 1916 with the advent of the National Park Service.

In 1868, John Muir wrote about the Tenaya Lake's beauty and timelessness in My First Summer in the Sierra.

== Geology ==
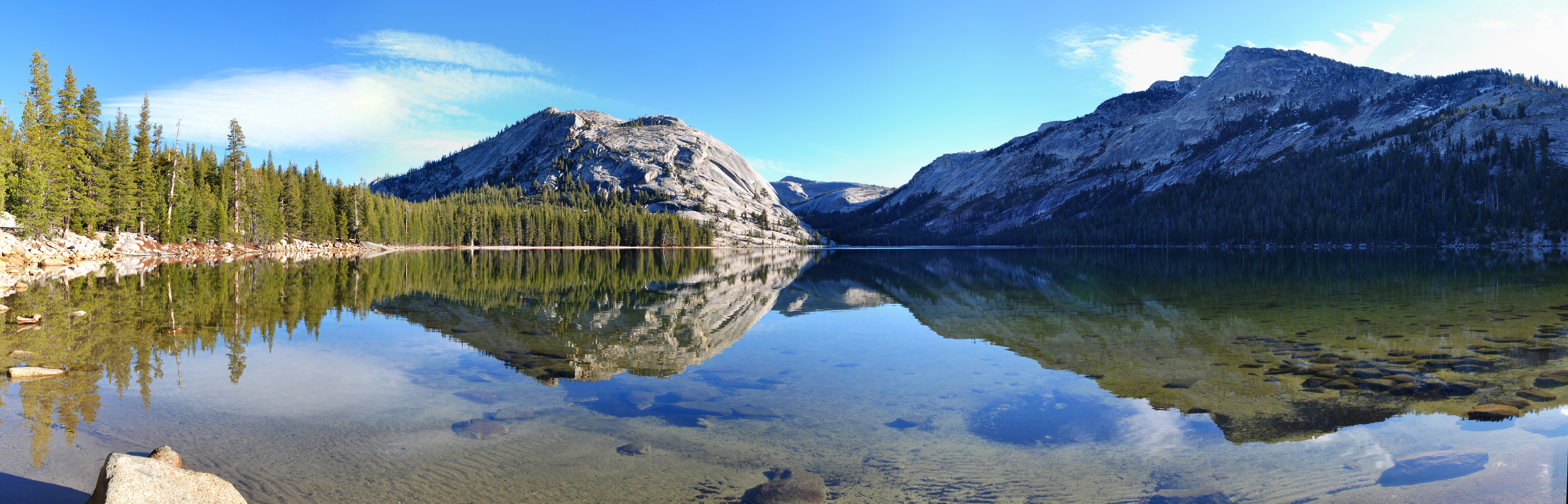
120° panorama at Tenaya Lake on an early-November morning. Stately Pleasure Dome is prominent center-left and Tenaya Peak, right.

Tenaya Lake was created by the Tenaya Glacier, which flowed out of the vast Tuolumne Ice Sheet and down to Yosemite Valley. This same glacier created Half Dome. The Tenaya Glacier was lightly loaded with debris, and did not leave a large amount of moraine material near Tenaya Lake.

== Hydrology ==
The lake is supplied by a network of creeks and springs including Murphy Creek to the northwest and Tenaya Creek. Tenaya Creek is an outflow of Cathedral Lakes and serves as both the principal inlet and outlet of Tenaya Lake. Tenaya Creek also runs through Tenaya Canyon into Yosemite Valley.

== Access and use ==
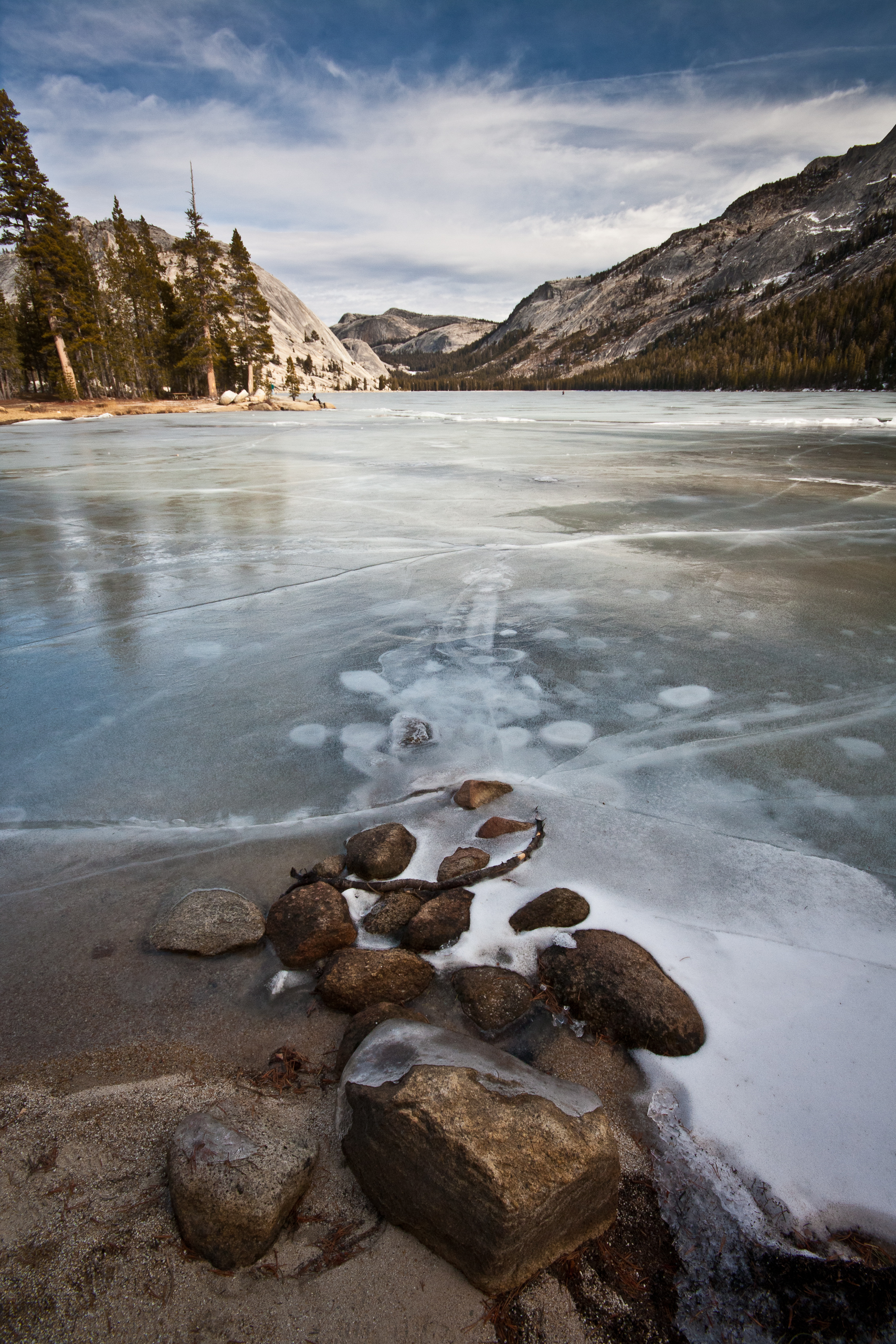
Frozen Tenaya Lake

Tenaya Lake can be accessed by car via Tioga Pass Road, which is called California State Route 120 outside the park. Visitors from the east must pass through the Tioga Pass Entrance on the eastern border of Yosemite National Park. Tioga Pass Road starts at the town Lee Vining on U.S. Route 395 140 miles (230 km) south of Reno and 330 miles (530 km) north of Los Angeles. Tioga Pass Road is closed by National Park Service during the winter months due to heavy snows. The connecting section to the east is closed by Caltrans when the park closes the entrance station for the winter. The lake can be accessed by automobile from the west via Crane Flat, where the Tioga Pass Road meets the Big Oak Flat Road that connects the Big Oak Flat entrance (and CA120) to the park and Yosemite Valley (and CA41 and CA140).

According to the US National Park Service, problems associated with visitor use have been persistent for decades. The Park Service has commissioned The Tenaya Lake Area Plan, a formal study and action plan to address solutions to these issues.

In 1992 a campground on the southwest shore of the lake was closed.

Hiking is a popular activity. Trailheads that start at Tenaya Lake lead to Cathedral Lakes, Clouds Rest, Half Dome, and the Yosemite Valley floor.

Fishing is permitted year-round at Yosemite National Park. Visitors over 16 require a valid California fishing license. Various species of trout can be caught in the lake.

Visitors can kayak, canoe, or sail on the lake. No formal launch facilities or docks are available, and motorized boats are not permitted. Swimming is permitted.

== Conservancy ==
In 2011, $850,000 was earmarked for restoration of Tenaya lake habitat by the Yosemite Conservancy. The program will reroute hiking trails away from sensitive wetlands.

== See also ==
- List of lakes in California
