= Echo Valley (California) =

Valley in Yosemite National Park

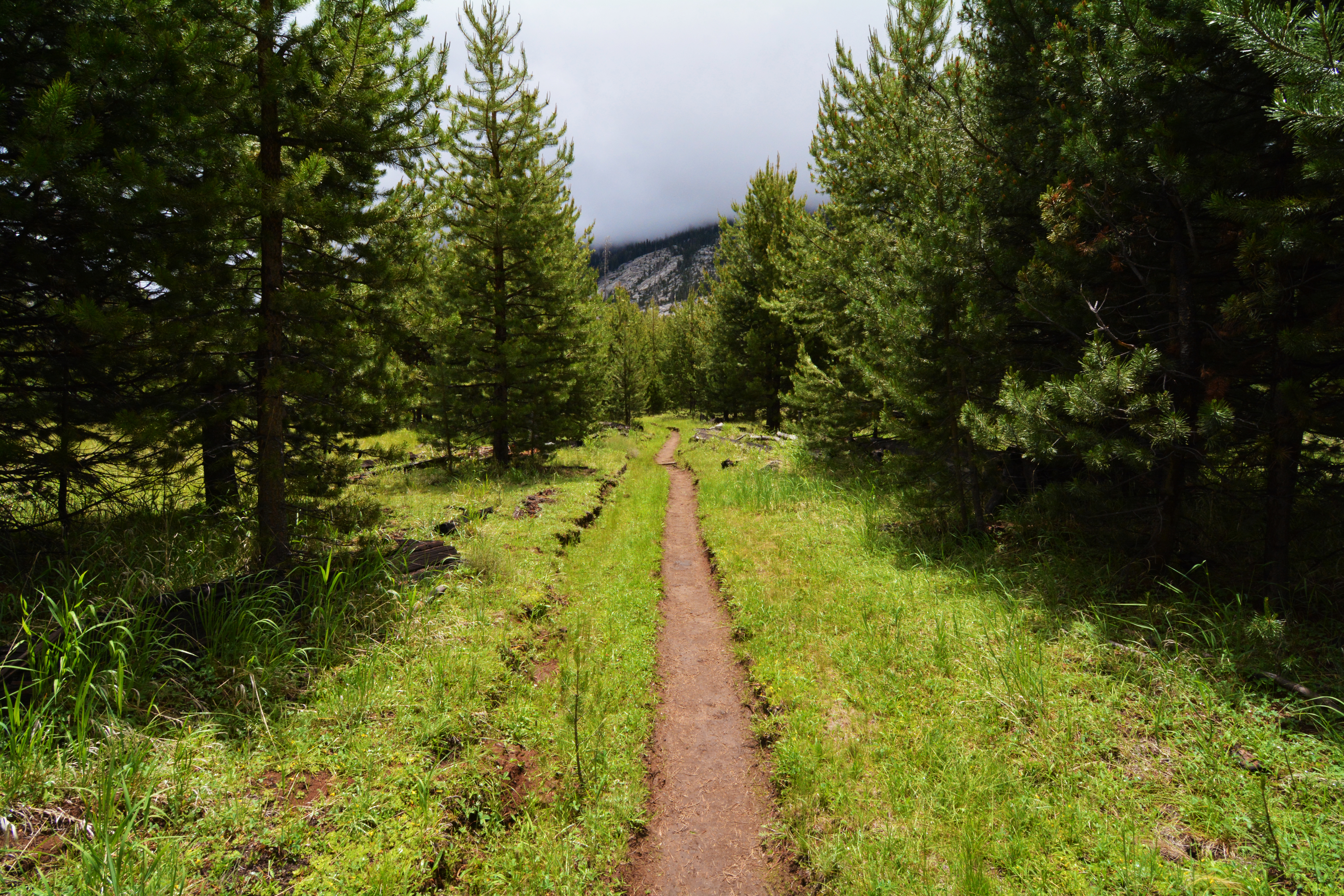
A trail through Echo Valley

Echo Valley is a valley in Yosemite National Park, at an elevation of 7,021 feet (2,140 m). It is located along Echo Creek, about 3 miles (5 km) west of Merced Lake, at 37°44′38″N 119°26′03″W. It is bounded on the south by the Merced River.

The valley contains a mosaic of meadows that are likely related to a fire that burned through the area in the 1980s. This fire killed most of the trees, raising the water table, and creating the meadows. Debris and deadfall from burned trees are common in many of the meadow areas.
