= Tenaya Canyon =

Canyon in Yosemite National Park, California, United States

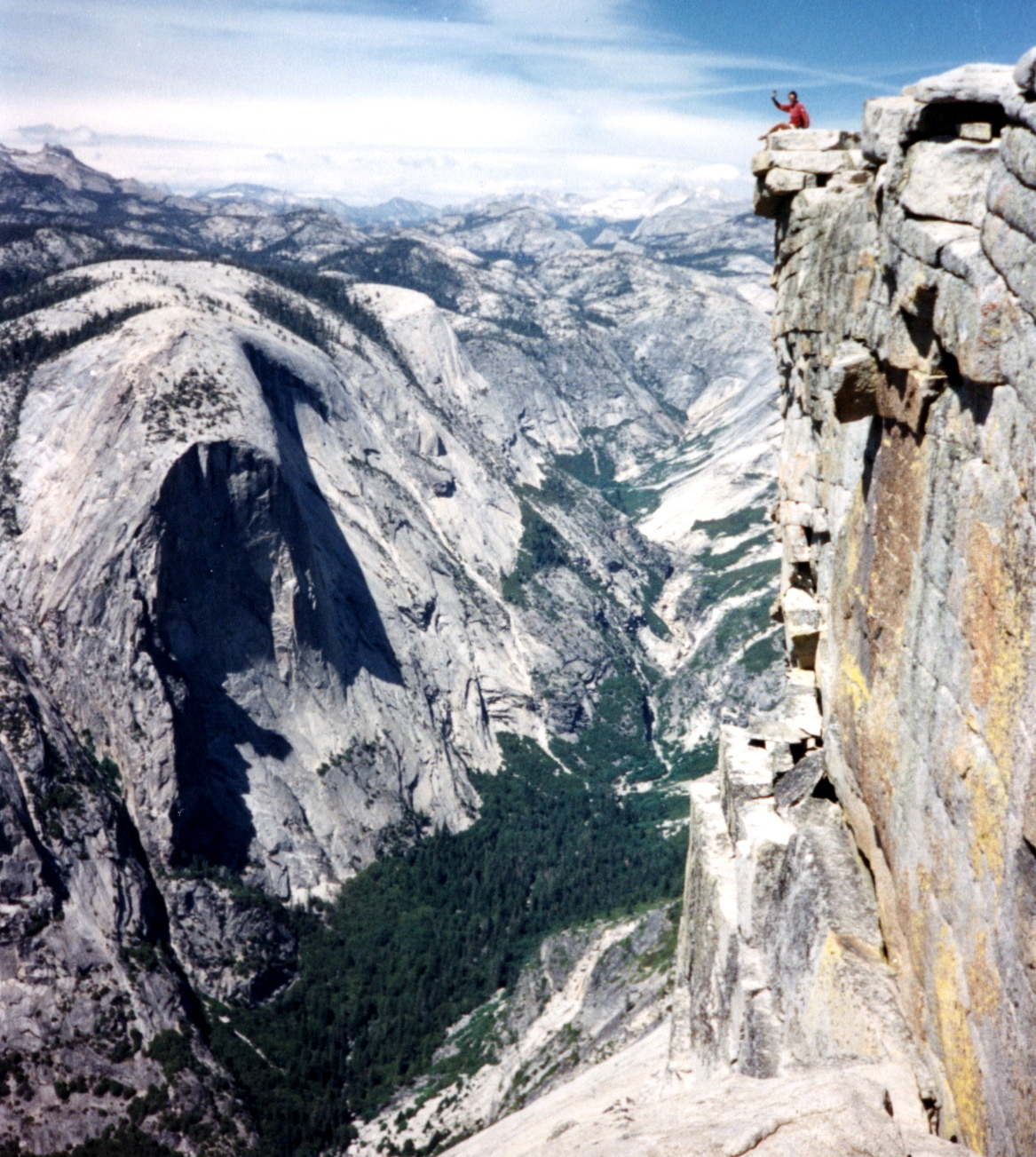
- Looking up Tenaya Canyon from the top of Half Dome
- Length: 10 miles (16 km) NE to SW

Geography
- Country: United States
- State: California
- Region: Mariposa County
- Coordinates: 37°44′32″N 119°33′18″W
- Mountain range: Sierra Nevada
- River: Tenaya Creek
- Interactive map of Tenaya Canyon

Tenaya Canyon is a dramatic and dangerous canyon in Yosemite National Park, California, USA, that runs from the outlet of Tenaya Lake 10 miles down to Yosemite Valley, carrying water in Tenaya Creek through a series of spectacular cascades and pools and thence into a deep canyon below Cloud's Rest, a giant granite mountain adjacent to Half Dome. Waterfalls on the creek inside the canyon include Pywiack Cascade (named for Pywiack Dome) and Three Chute Falls, near Mirror Lake.

The top of the canyon can be seen from Tioga Pass Road (Route 120), which goes through Tuolumne Meadows and Tioga Pass. From Olmsted Point (a roadside viewing area), Clouds Rest and Yosemite's signature Half Dome dominate the canyon. At the bottom of the canyon, in Yosemite Valley, lies Mirror Lake, accessible by shuttle bus and a short walk. The Quarter Domes are not far, up Tenaya Canyon.

== Geology ==
The canyon is notable for its abundance of glacial polish. The narrowness and V-shape of the bottom of the canyon are due to the peculiarity of the glacial quarrying there: the longitudinal belt of fractures favored the downward plucking, while the lateral quarrying was limited by the solid rock masses on both sides. The staircase in the canyon is underdeveloped, except for a gigantic first step at its head.

== Hiking ==
The canyon has no foot trail and is notoriously difficult to navigate due to its steep and polished sides, particularly in spring and summer when water levels are high, Signs warn against hiking in the canyon. The American Canyoneering Association gives Tenaya Canyon a rating of 3B V. The 3 is an "intermediate" rating on a scale of 1 to 4, with 4 most difficult; B is a measure of water volume on a scale of A to C; and the V indicates that the trip will take one and a half days.

The canyon has achieved notoriety because of a curse Chief Tenaya reportedly invoked in the 1850s as a result of the death of his son at the hands of a battalion intending to forcibly displace the Ahwahnechee people of Yosemite Valley. Those who believe in the curse cite accidents, mysterious deaths, and disappearances. For example, in 1996, two hikers died in the canyon on the same day. Some park rangers have reportedly referred to Tenaya Canyon as the Bermuda Triangle of Yosemite.

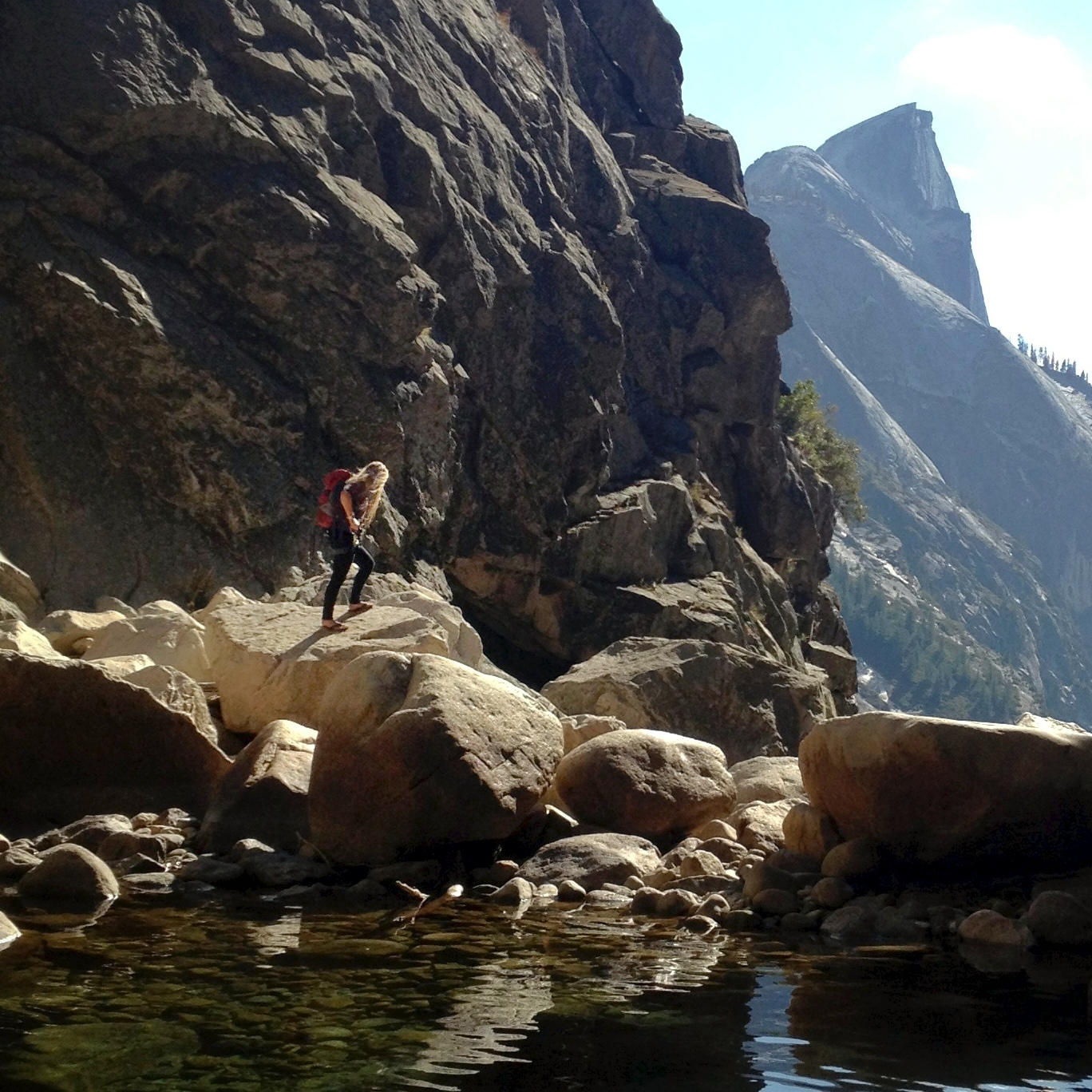
Hiking in Tenaya Canyon

Hiking the canyon involves dangerous exposure to heights, and even if there is minimal water in Tenaya Creek, mandatory swims, dangerous waterfalls, and cascades. Wet and slippery glacially polished granite adds to the likelihood of falling.

== Sources ==
- Matthes, François E. (1972). "Geologic History of the Yosemite Valley". Glaciers and Glacial Erosion. Macmillan Education UK. pp. 92–118. doi:10.1007/978-1-349-15480-7_6.
