= Clouds Rest =

Prominent arête in Yosemite National Park

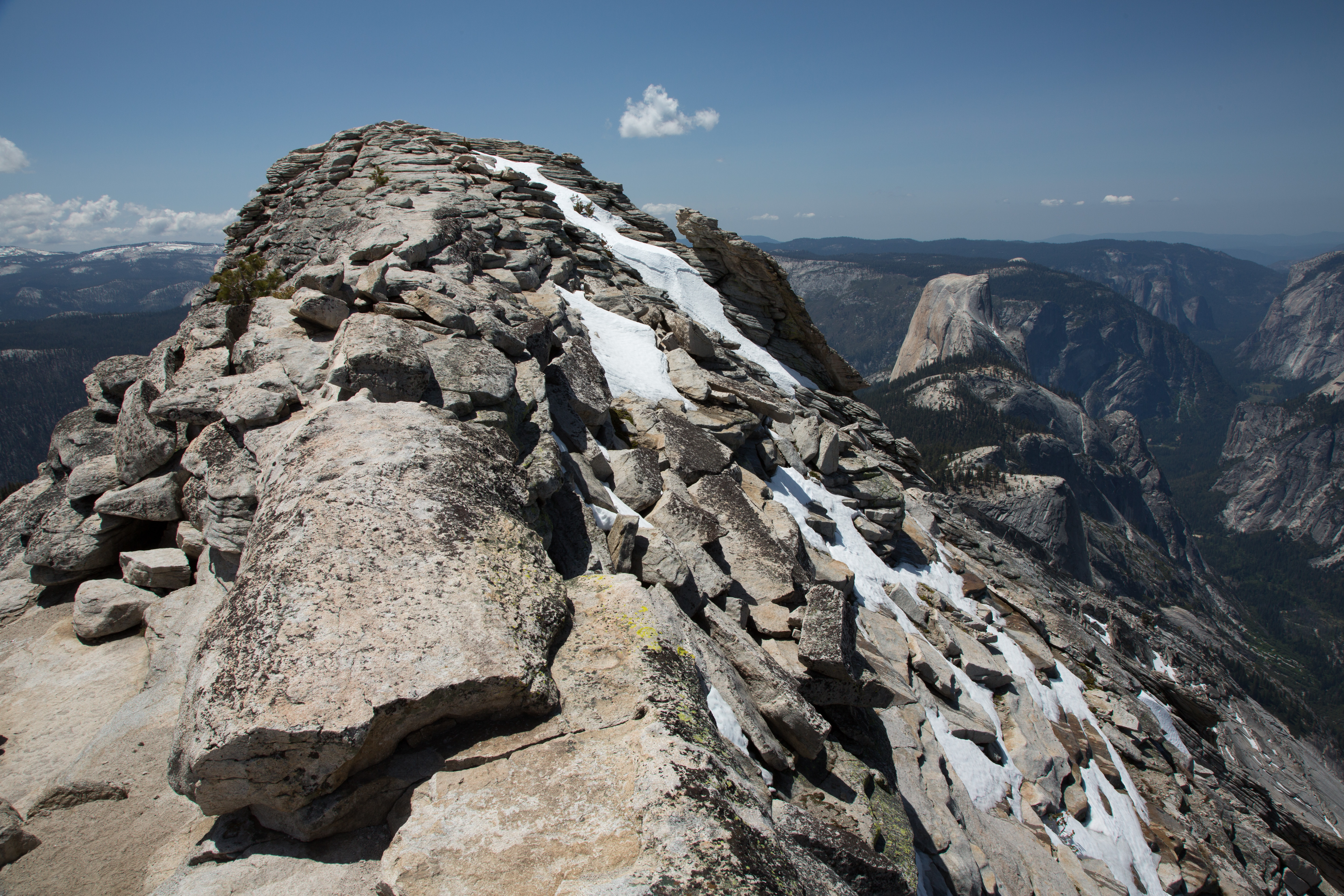
- The summit of Clouds Rest.

Highest point
- Elevation: 9,930 ft (3,027 m) NAVD 88
- Prominence: 806 ft (246 m)
- Parent peak: Tresidder Peak
- Listing: Sierra Peaks Section; Western States Climbers Emblem peak
- Coordinates: 37°46′04″N 119°29′21″W

Geography
- Location within California Location within the United States
- Location: Yosemite National Park, Mariposa County, California, U.S.
- Parent range: Sierra Nevada
- Topo map: USGS Tenaya Peak

Climbing
- Easiest route: Trail hike, class 1

Clouds Rest is a mountain in Yosemite National Park, located east-northeast of Yosemite Village, California. Although there are many peaks in the park having far greater elevation, the proximity of Clouds Rest to the valley gives it a very high degree of visual prominence.

== Geography ==
The summit can be reached by a 7.2-mile (11.6 km) trail hike from Tioga Pass Road or a 13-mile (21 km) trail hike from Happy Isles by way of Little Yosemite Valley. There are also several technical routes available.

Clouds Rest is an arête; a thin, almost knife-like, ridge of rock formed when glaciers eroded away solid rock to form Tenaya Canyon and Little Yosemite Valley. The northwest face, mostly solid granite, rises 5,000 feet (1,520 m) above Tenaya Creek.

== History ==
Lafayette H. Bunnell, a medical doctor with the Mariposa Battalion, notes that his party named the summit Clouds Rest because they returned to camp to avoid a snow storm after seeing "the clouds rapidly settling down to rest upon that mountain."

== Recreation ==
There are three main ways to access the summit of Clouds Rest; via the Sunrise Lakes Trailhead off of CA-120 (commonly known as the Northeast Ridge Route); via the Happy Isles Trailhead in Yosemite Valley (commonly known as the South Slope); or via the Northwest Face of the mountain. The Sunrise Lakes Trail is a round trip hike of 14.5 miles (23.3 km) that begins at an elevation of 8,150 feet (2,480 m) and gains 1,776 feet (541 m) over 7.25 miles (11.67 km) to reach the summit at 9,926 feet (3,025 m). The summit has wide-ranging 360-degree panoramic views.

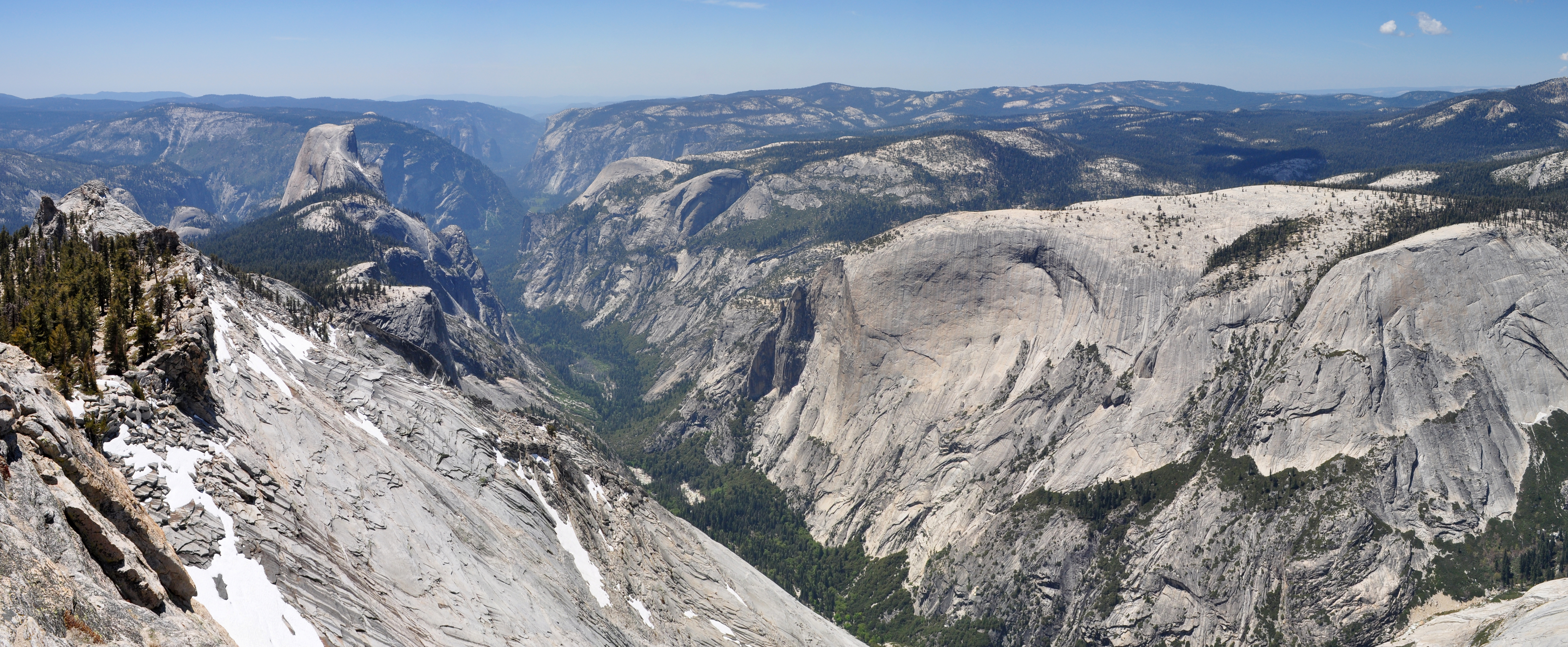
A view of Yosemite Valley from the summit of Clouds Rest
