= Royal Arches Route =

Mountain climbing route on the Royal Arches wall in Yosemite Valley, California

- Location: California, USA
- Coordinates: 37.74840°N 119.569°W
- Climbing area: Yosemite Valley
- Route type: Traditional climbing, Big wall climbing
- Vertical gain: 1,400 feet (430 m)
- Pitches: 16
- Technical grade: 5.7 A0 or 5.10a (6a)
- NCCS grade: II
- First ascent: Oct. 1936. Ken Adam, Morgan Harris, K. Kenneth Davis

The Royal Arches Route is a big wall climbing route in California's Yosemite Valley on the Royal Arches wall. The route is recognized in the historic climbing text Fifty Classic Climbs of North America. The route was first climbed Oct. 1936 by Ken Adam, Morgan Harris, K. Kenneth Davis. The route is moderate in difficulty and is frequently climbed. The first 4 pitches are along a west-facing dihedral. At Pitch 5, the route turns north and ascends the main face along crack systems. Pitch 10 can be free climbed at 5.10b however, most climbers use a fixed rope to pendulum to a long ledge. At the end of Pitch 15, begins the bolted rappel route. It is 18 rappels to the Valley floor. Some climbers prefer to continue to "The Jungle" at the end of Pitch 16. Beyond The Jungle is a 5.4 slab and 4th Class scrambling to the Valley Rim. The descent is usually accomplished by traversing northeast to Washington Column and descending the exposed North Dome Gully.

The Royal Arches route has long been a popular free solo, and the competition over the years has led to some astounding ascent times. Even as far back as 1979, the 15-pitch ascent was being done in under an hour. However, many people find themselves spending the night on the route. There have been several accidents on the route and rappel route.

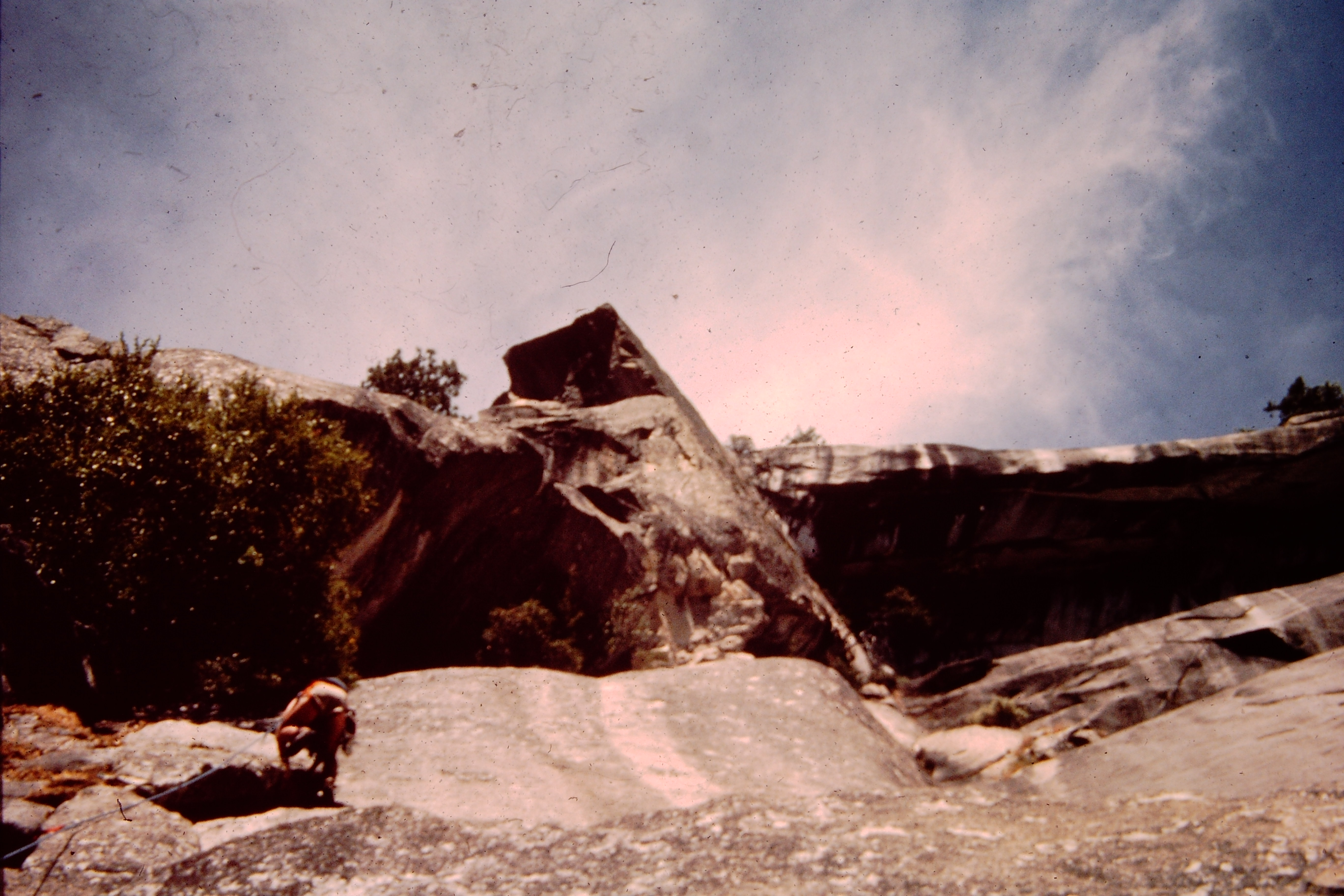
Leading the 11th Pitch of Royal Arches, August 1984. This was shortly after the famed rotten log fell on the original route.
