= American Guide Series =

Local tourism guides by WPA employees

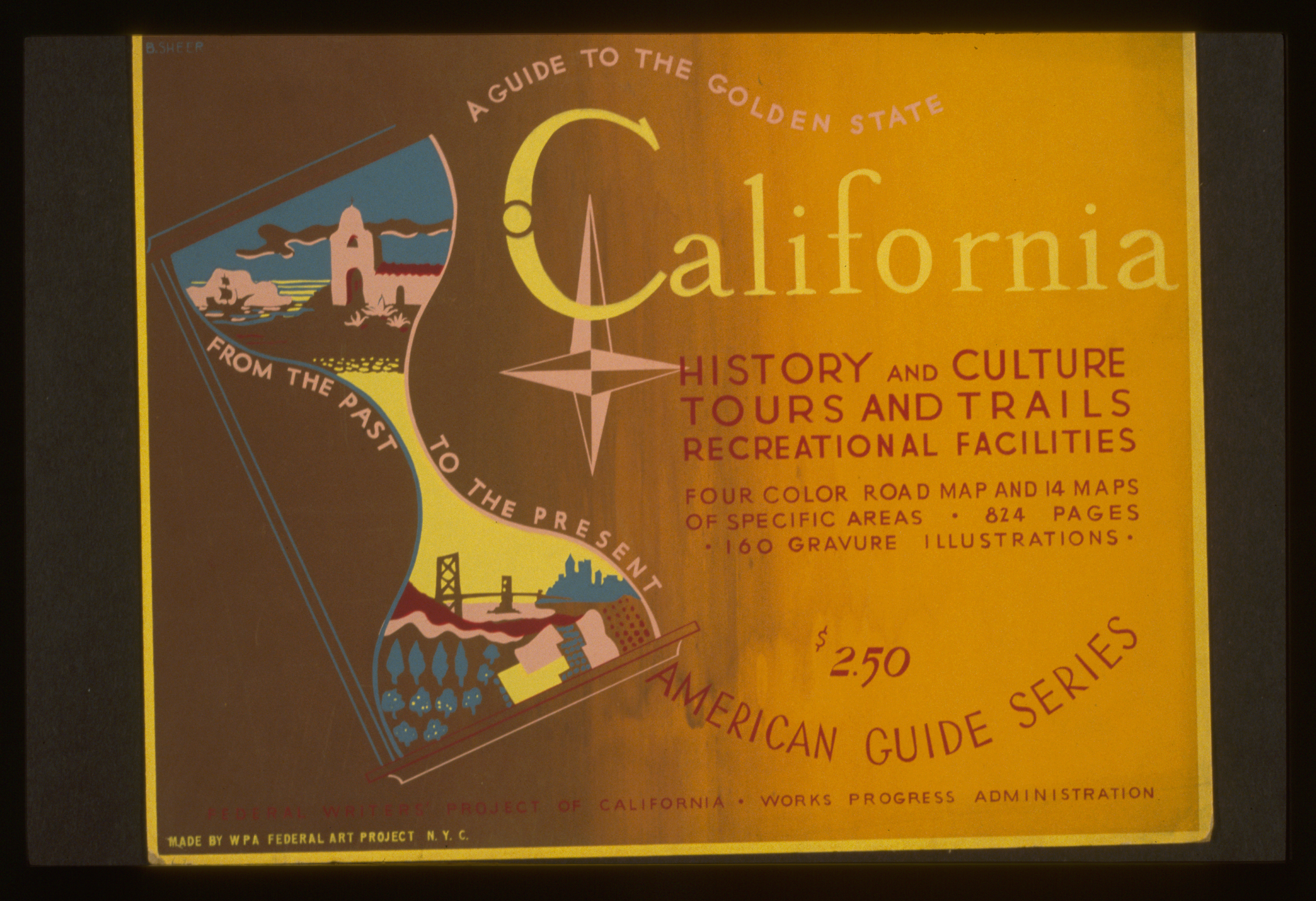
Poster advertising the American Guide to California

The American Guide Series includes books and pamphlets published from 1937 to 1941 under the auspices of the Federal Writers' Project (FWP), a Depression-era program that was part of the larger Works Progress Administration in the United States. The American Guide Series books were compiled by the FWP, but printed by individual states, and contained detailed histories of each of the then 48 states of the Union with descriptions of every major city and town. The series not only detailed the histories of the 48 states, but provided insight to their cultures as well. In total, the project employed over 6,000 writers. The format was uniform, comprising essays on the state's history and culture, descriptions of its major cities, automobile tours of important attractions, and a portfolio of photographs.

Many books in the project have been updated by private companies or republished without updating. Although not then a state, a guide for Alaska was published, and also for Puerto Rico (but not for Hawaii).

If there had been room in Rocinante I would have packed the W.P.A. Guides to the States, all forty-eight volumes of them...The complete set comprises the most comprehensive account of the United States ever got together, and nothing since has approached it."

— John Steinbeck, Travels with Charley (1962)

== Origins ==
As part of the Federal Writers' Project established under the Emergency Relief Appropriation Act of 1935 and the Works Progress Administration, over 6,500 men and women were employed around the country as writers, collecting stories, interviews, and photographs on a variety of subjects. The project attracted many unemployed writers and artists, offering a wage of $20 a week. President Franklin D. Roosevelt enlisted Henry Alsberg, a journalist and playwright to head the project.

As part of this, the FWP developed and published a series of books that served as guides to the 48 existing states. Each book's primary purpose was to not only outline the history of the individual state, but its culture and geography as well. Their predecessor, Baedeker's Handbook for Travelers: United States, lacked much of what was needed to give a picture of America during the 1930s. Alsberg insisted that the new series of books paint a picture of American culture as a whole and celebrate the nation's diversity. From 1937 to 1941, thousands of writers set out around the country to capture America's culture, conducting fieldwork, interviewing citizens, and observing and recording folk traditions and local customs. Writers from all over the country sought to capture American culture during the Great Depression, a difficult task given the dire circumstances. Alsberg tasked Benjamin A. Botkin, a folklorist and scholar, with running the folklore division of the project. Botkin was responsible for coordinating and managing the writers, a task that was too large for Alsberg to handle, as the volume of work coming in was plentiful for the project. In this role, Botkin not only influenced the writers' folklore division but also had a great influence on their coverage of culture.

The project's beginnings did not come without challenges. During its infancy, various writers' organizations pressured the project because of the parameters that were set by the FWP. With the project bringing many established writers back into the workforce, the Authors' Guild of America became aggressive in the pursuit of relaxing guidelines for the writers, and also developed a disdain for the project's employment of writers with a lack of experience. With the FWP's main focus on creating jobs for the unemployed, the Author's Guild and organizations similar to it continued to criticize the amateurism of many writers on the project. The solution to this critique was a simple one: find enough work for all of the writers. The roles of the writers enlisted to work on the project not only included their initial role as writers, but also as photographers, geographers, and cartographers, allowing the creation of additional white collar jobs.

== Creation ==
The books in the series were to contain accurate and thorough accounts of American history, according to a letter to State directors on the project. Each book's primary purpose was to not only outline the history of the individual states but the following as well:

- Geography
- Agriculture
- Tourist attractions
- Ethnic groups
- Architecture
- Arts
- Industry

Three different types of guides were published: state, regional, and city guides. Each guide had its own distinct features, but followed the same uniform structure.

=== State guides ===
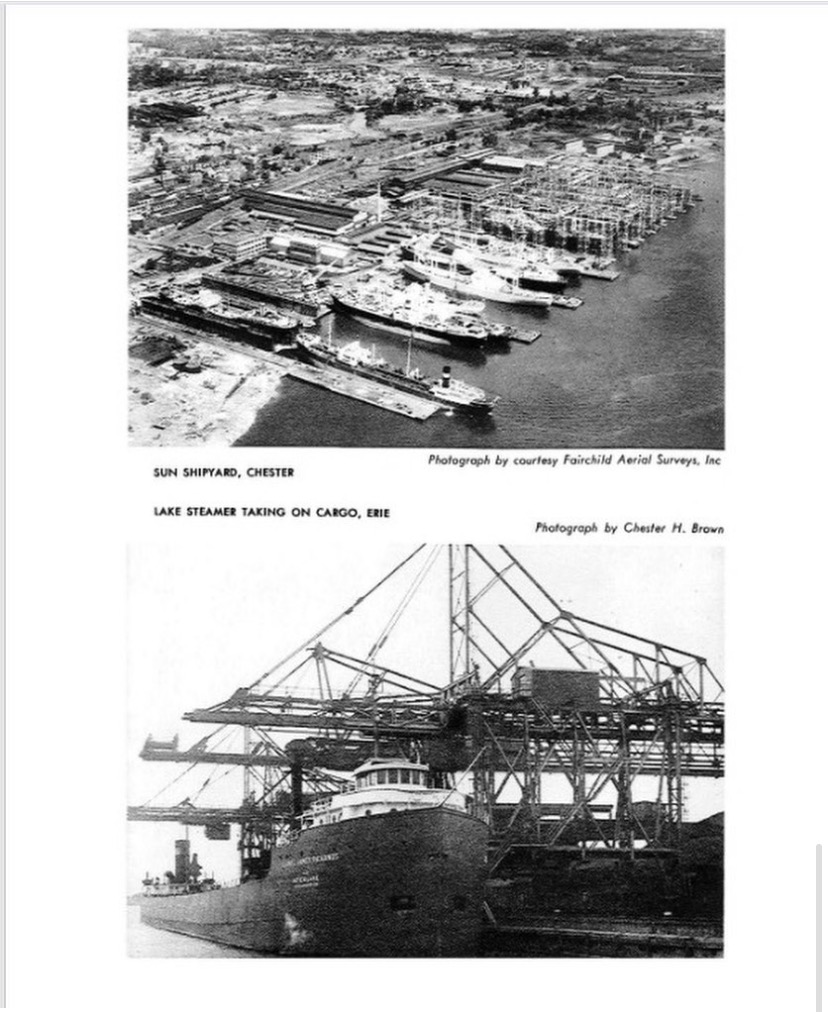
The Pennsylvania guide highlighted the shipping industry in Chester, Pa. Highlighting different industries was a common feature in each of the guides.

Each of the 48 existing contiguous states had its own guide. The state guides included stories about the state's heritage, maps of major cities, as well as photographs of historic sites and tourist attractions. Each state's division of the FWP was responsible for printing and distributing the books. The state guides provided great detail as to each state's history. In the case of some states that had joined the union more recently as the nation grew, the guide presented an origin story or folklore account to describe its beginnings. In the California Guide, writers used the story of El Dorado, the mythical tribal thief, to tell readers why settlers yearned to move to the new state in the mid-19th century.

One priority for each guide was to have detailed road maps of cities and major highways throughout each state. The American Baedeker lacked them because during the time it was published, the automobile was not a common asset in everyday life in the country. The state guides also exhibited industries unique to each state. Guides highlighted blue-collar industries such as shipping, mining, and oil rigging, informing readers about what drove state economies. For instance, the Pennsylvania State Guide highlighted the state's shipping industry that helped grow and industrialize the city of Chester, which eventually made a comeback after the depression during World War II.

The guides' main goal of highlighting aspects of the states' cultures and histories was an interesting task for the writers in charge of doing so. Several writers documented these challenges in their memos while working on the project. As the Depression went on, trying to capture normalcy became difficult. The projection of wealth in a nation that was experiencing a drastic rise in poverty was on display in many of the guides. The South Carolina guide presented polo clubs as a popular form of sport and leisure, which were on the rise throughout the country leading up to the Depression. Despite being highlighted as a focal point in the guide, this was in contrast to much of what many of the writers had seen during their travels. Several writers noted in their memos how their perception of a state was changed by the culture that the Depression had created. Overall the guides aimed to draw potential travelers to experience each state's culture, and projecting each state in the utmost positive light was critical to accomplishing this.

=== Regional guides ===
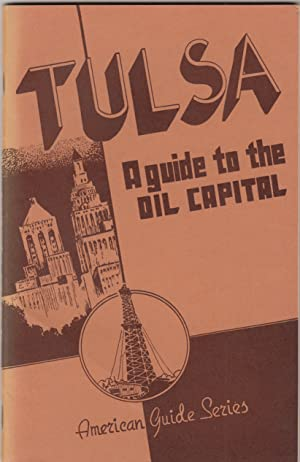
The cover of the Tulsa guide, one of 40 city guides published

The regional and city guides, similar to their state counterparts, kept much of the same format but had their own specific focuses. The regional guides were designed with a tourist-heavy audience in mind, as some of their titles suggest. One of the regional books, Ghost Towns of Colorado, explored some of the most popular deserted towns in the western state. While the state guides provided an overview of tourist attractions in certain regions of the states, the regional guides allowed for a greater magnification of this. The regional guides also showcased the country's diversity in regional attractions, highlighting regions such as New England and vacation destinations such as Cape Cod. Three United States territories, Alaska, Hawaii, and Puerto Rico, were also included in the series, educating Americans about these more recently acquired regions. There were also some "outliers" produced by American Guide writers, namely In the Land of Breathitt (1941), Fairs and Fair Makers of Kentucky (1942), and A Military History of Kentucky (1939).

=== City guides ===
The city guides had the most narrow scope out of all three types, as the focus was on a single location. Because of this, their maps could be in the greatest detail, not only giving an overview of a city's layout, but individual neighborhoods as well. City Guides highlighted points of special interest in greater detail. In the Philadelphia guide, sites such as Carpenters' Hall and Girard College, an-all boys boarding school in the city's northern section, each had several pages dedicated to them. The maps that were included in each book added value to them as material objects and not just literature. With the increasing mobility afforded by the number of Americans who owned automobiles, the guides served as reliable and durable resources for travelers moving throughout the country.

== Impact within New Deal ==
Over the course of the five-year span during which FWP workers created the guides, nearly 7,000 writers, editors, researchers, and historians were put back to work through working on the American Guide Series. By the project's end the government had spent over $11 billion on employing the personnel on the project. The guides also served as a representation on the New Deal's concern with regional interdependence and national planning, projecting a positive image of the nation during economically harsh times. Many writers were not only put back to work but other writers were able to use the project as a springboard as well, to launch their writing careers.

== Legacy ==
The guidebooks are the most well-known publication to emerge from the FWP, having been reprinted several times, as scholars and researchers have sought them out for their cultural value. When they were originally published, the guides restored a sense of pride in many of their respected regions, by promoting the history of each state or city, as well as popular tourist attractions and historical sites. From a literary perspective, the guides expanded the definition of American literature. They showed how American writing could cover a wide range of analysis through biographical, folklore, and related geographic content. During the start of the COVID-19 pandemic, several writers and politicians called for a new Federal Writers' Project. Congressman Ted Lieu and Congresswoman Teresa Leger Fernandez introduced legislation to create a new project, garnering support from several writers and journalists.

== Gallery ==
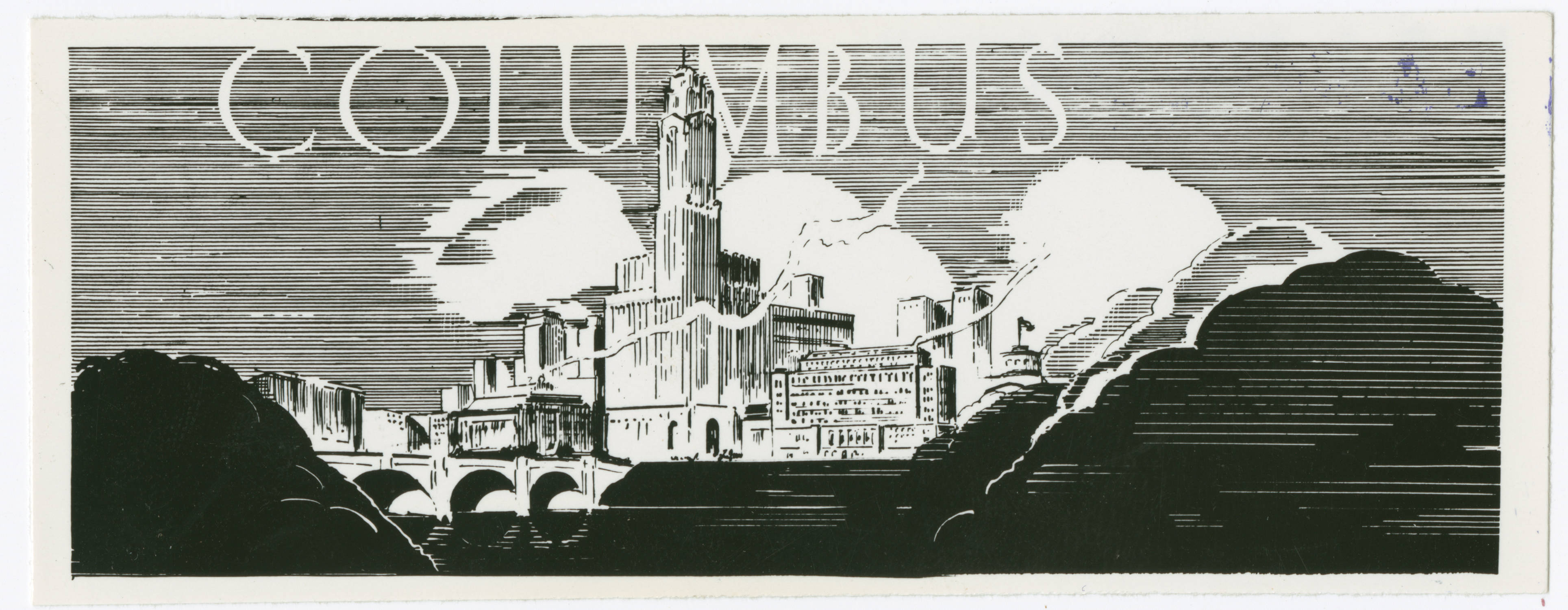
A chapter heading from the Ohio guide

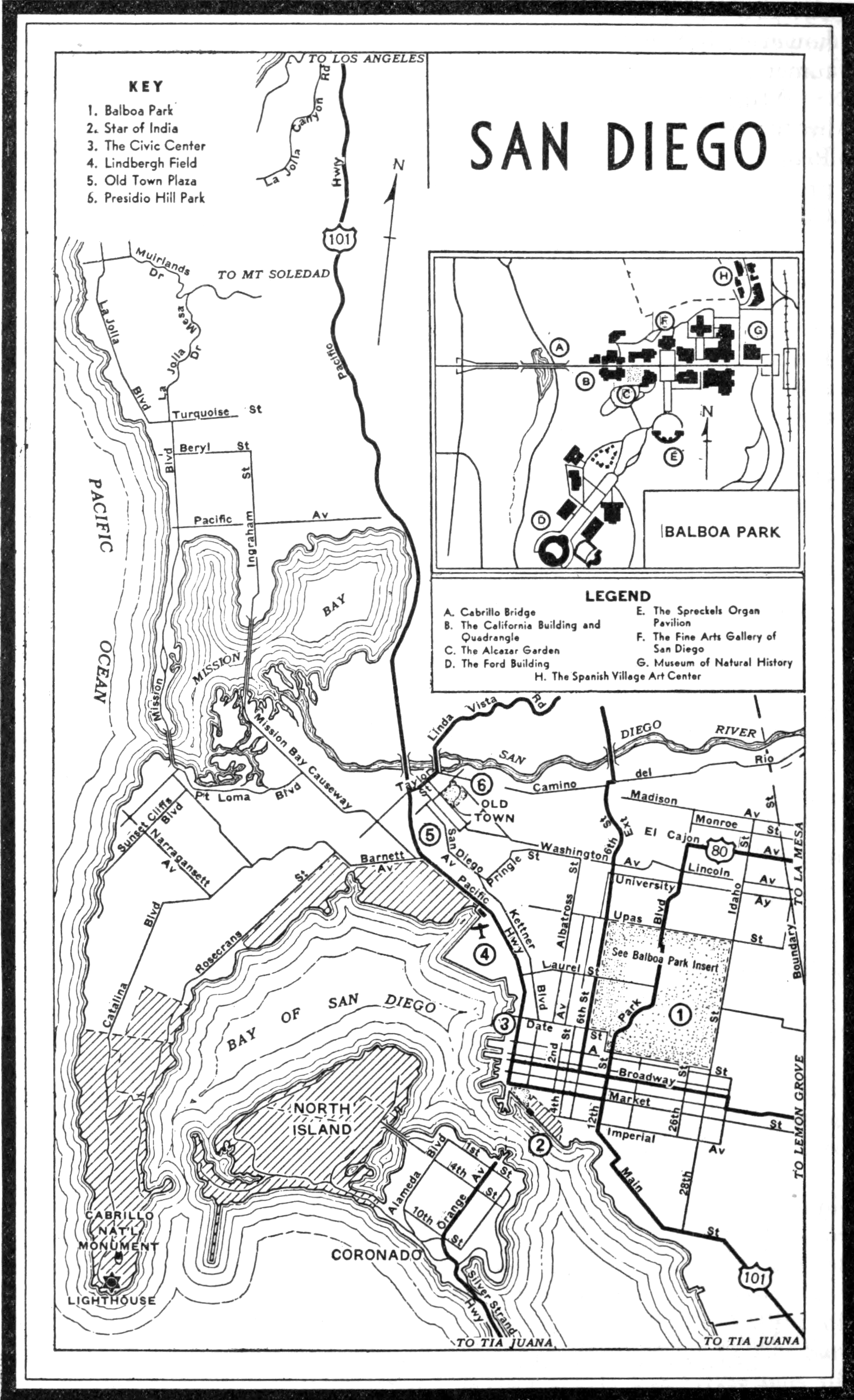
A map of San Diego from the California guide published in 1939

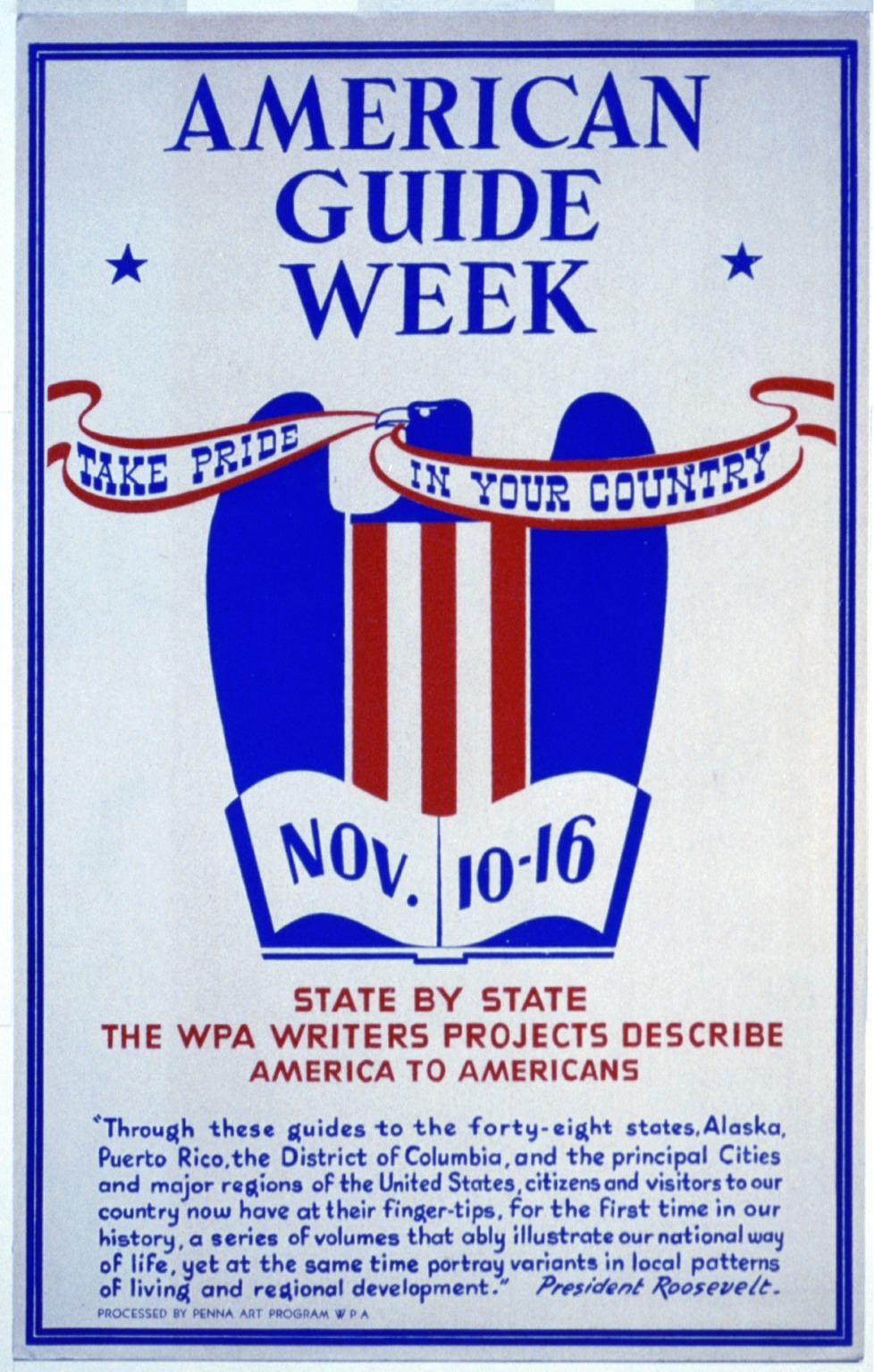
Poster advertising state by state WPA Writers Projects that "describe America to Americans"

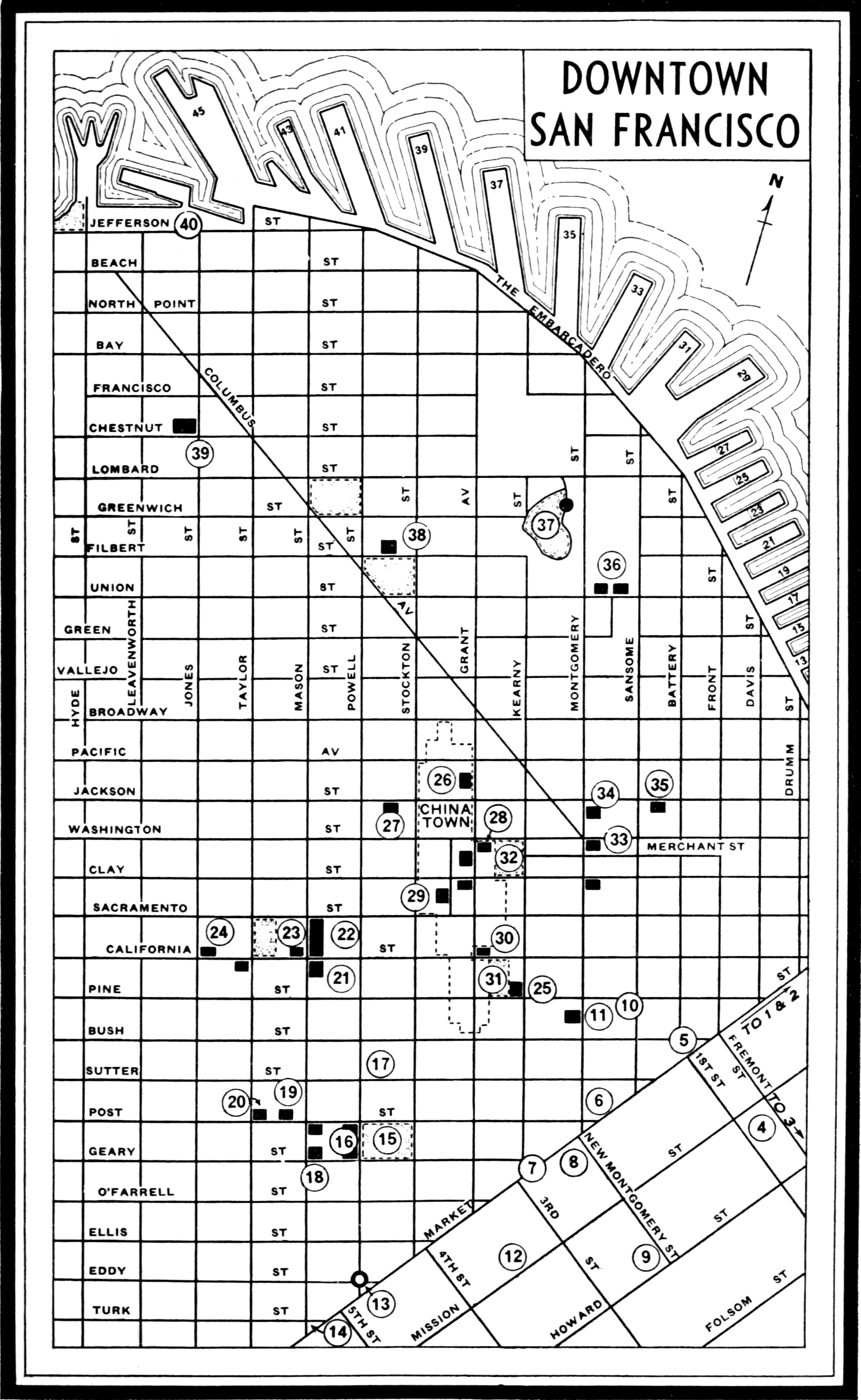
Map of downtown San Francisco in the California guide

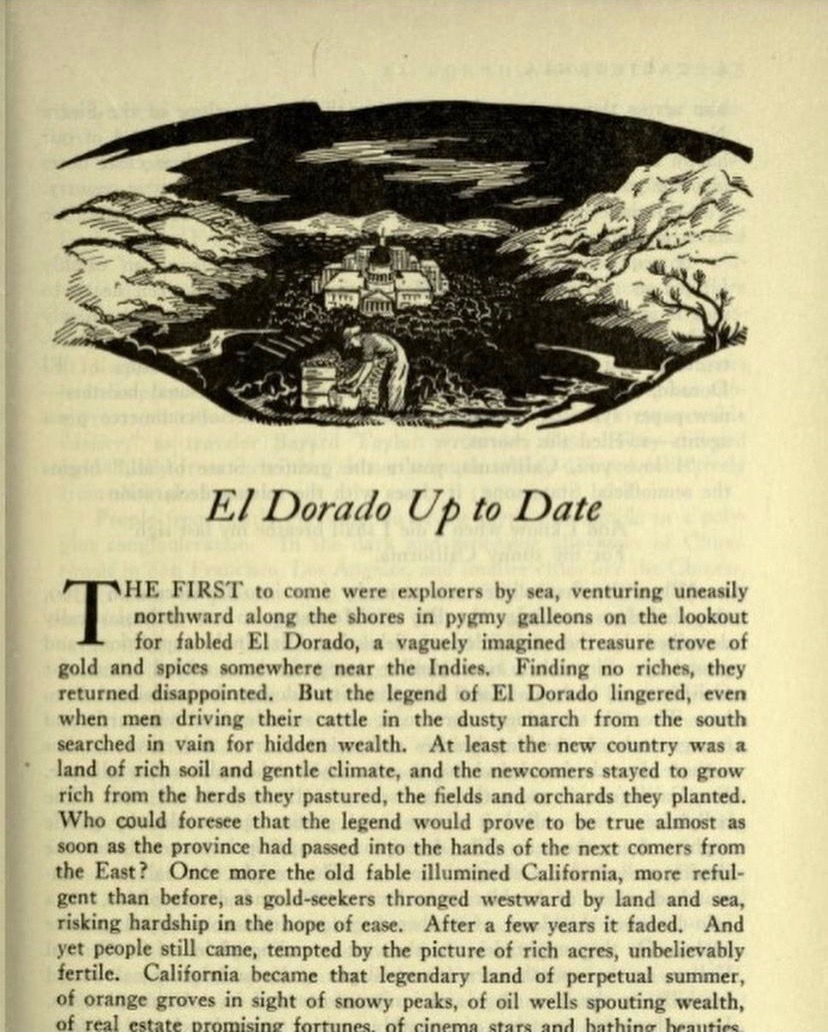
The story of El Dorado from the California guide

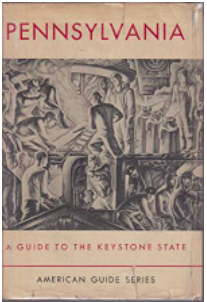
The cover of the Pennsylvania guide, highlighting the state's once-prosperous steel industry

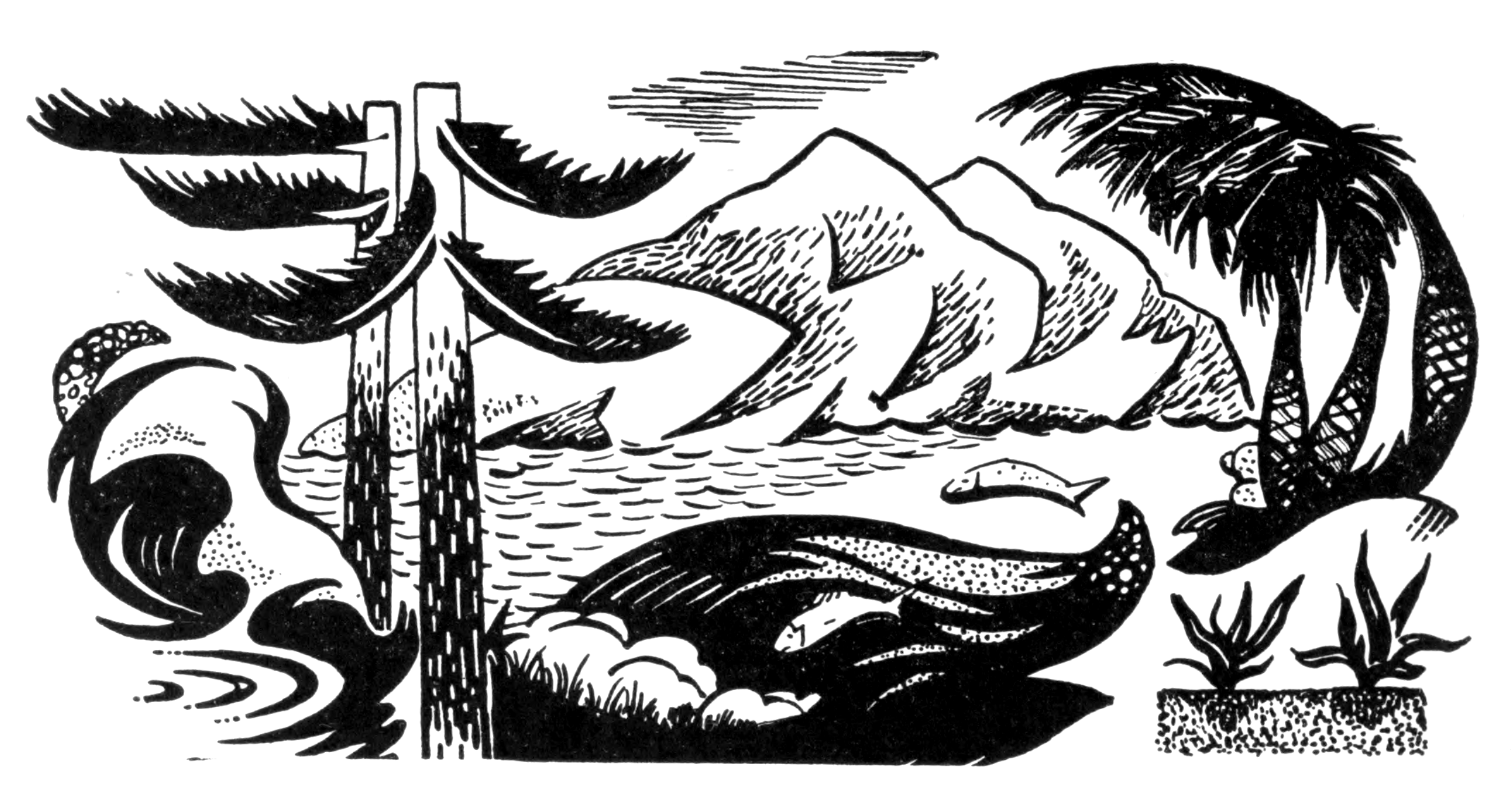
Artwork from the California guide

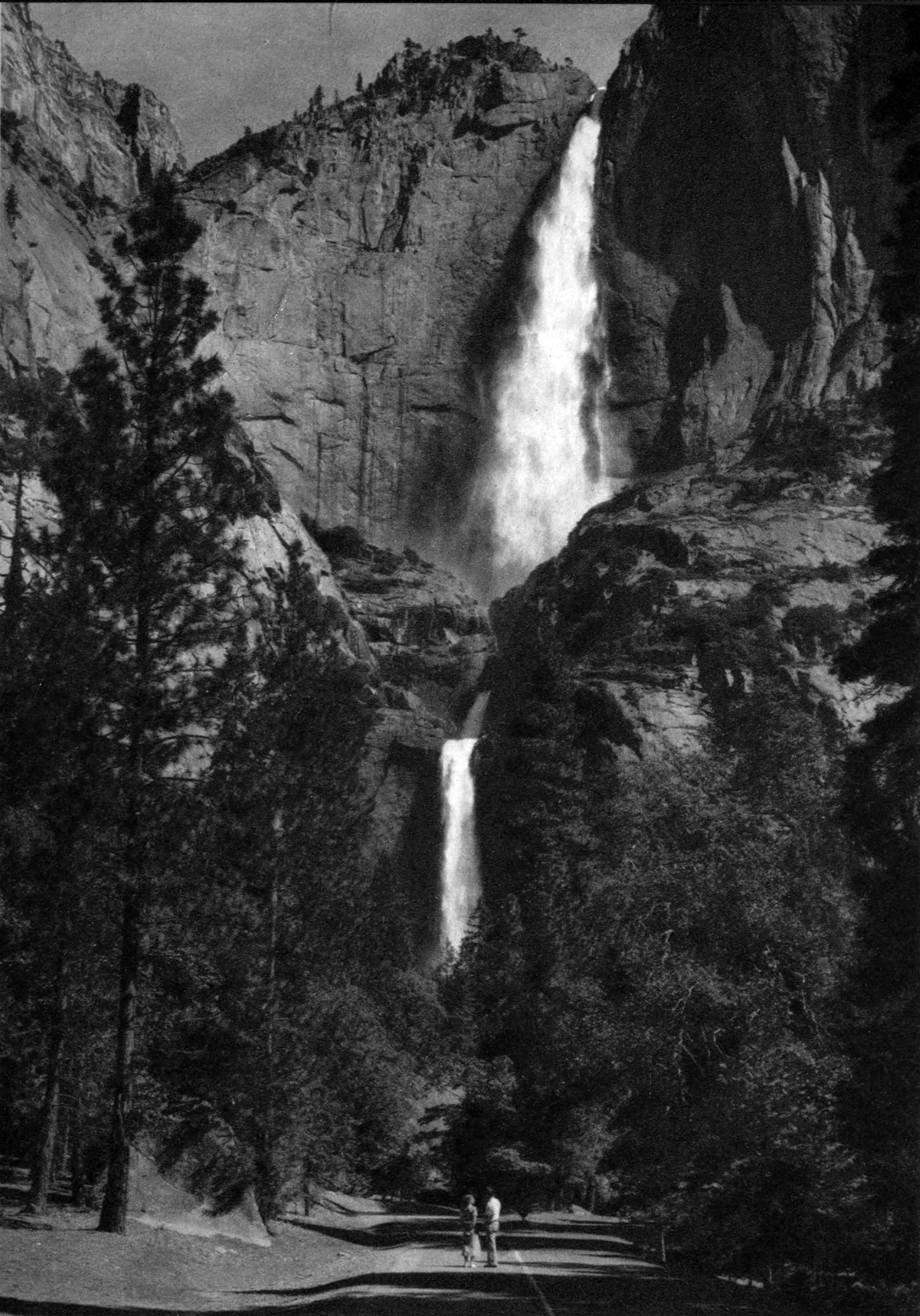
A picture of Yosemite Falls in the California guide

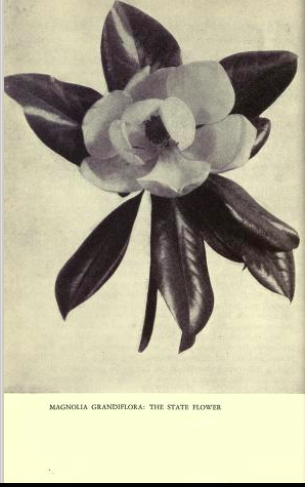
Illustration of a Magnolia, the state flower of Mississippi in its state guide

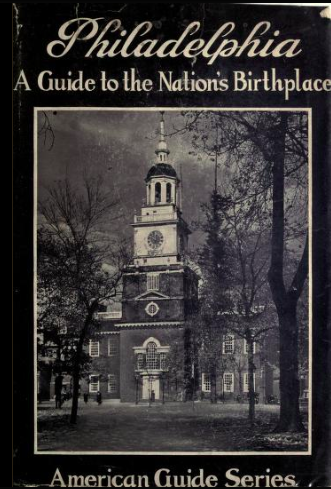
The cover of the Philadelphia guide, with Independence Hall as its face

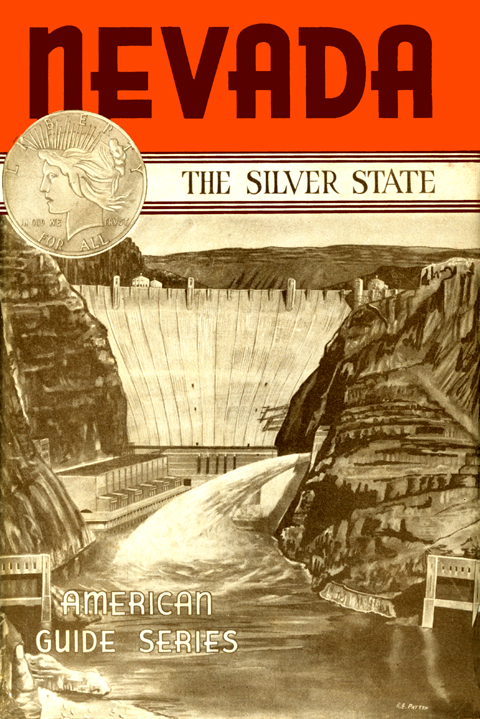
The cover of the Nevada guide which featured the Hoover Dam

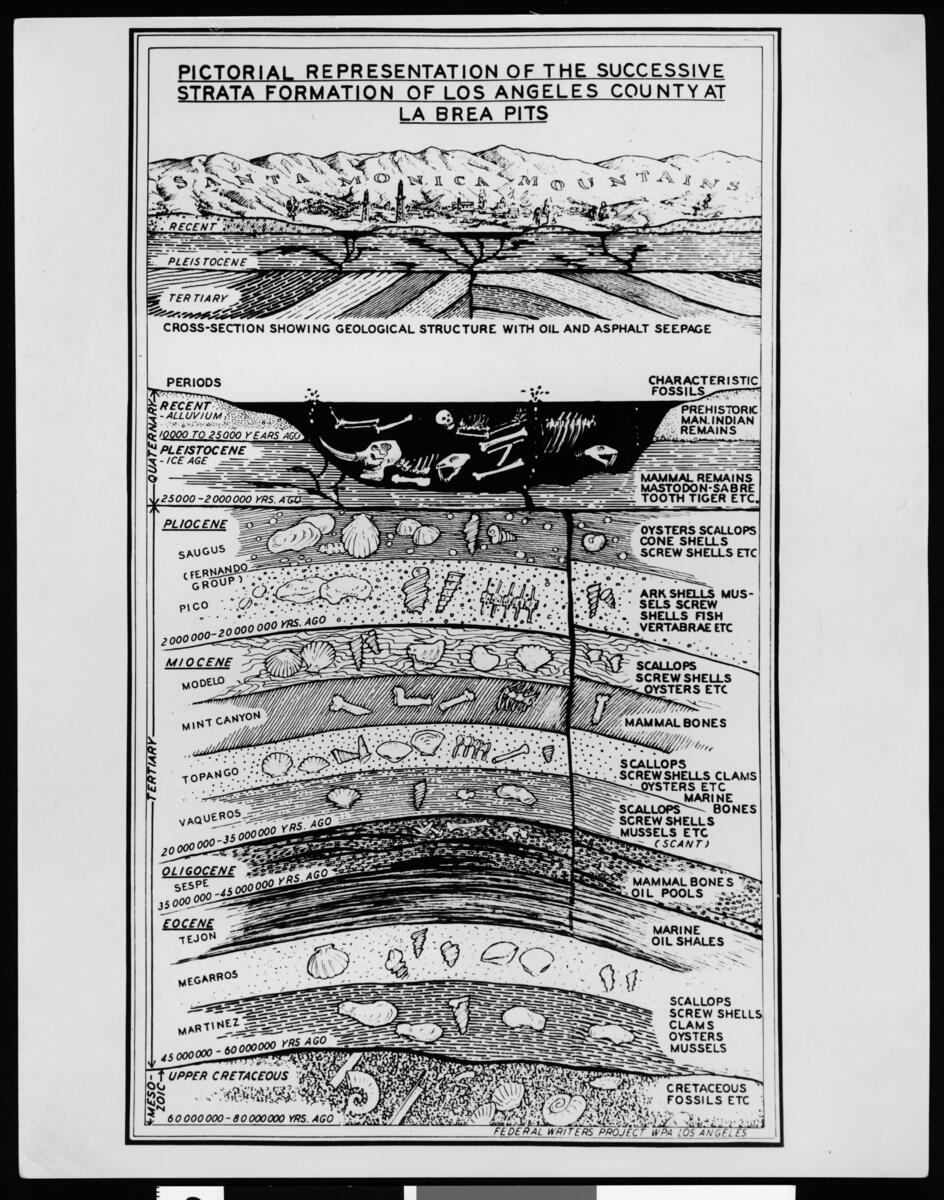
LaBrea Tar Pits strata chart, 1938

American Guide Series book display at Bullock's Department Store, Los Angeles

Ohio Guide books on sale at the James Book Store in Cincinnati, Ohio

== Titles ==
=== States ===
State	Title	Google Books	HathiTrust	Internet Archive
Alabama	Alabama; a Guide to the Deep South, New York: Hastings House, 1941	Google Books	HathiTrust	Internet Archive
Arizona	Arizona, the Grand Canyon State (4th ed.). New York: Hastings House. 1956.	1940 ed. via Google Books	HathiTrust	1940 ed. Internet Archive
Arkansas	Arkansas: a Guide to the State, New York, 1941, OCLC 478887	Google Books	HathiTrust	
California	California: Guide to the Golden State, New York: Hastings House, 1939			Internet Archive
Colorado	Colorado: a Guide to the Highest State. New York: Hastings House. 1945.	1941 ed. via Google Books		Internet Archive + 1970 ed. via Internet Archive
Connecticut	Connecticut: a Guide to its Roads, Lore, and People. Boston: Houghton Mifflin. 1938.	Google Books	HathiTrust	Internet Archive
Delaware	Delaware: A Guide to the First State. NY: Viking Press. 1938.	Google Books	HathiTrust	
Florida	Florida: A Guide to the Southernmost State, 1939	Google Books		Internet Archive
Georgia	Georgia: a Guide to Its Towns and Countryside. Athens: University of Georgia Press. 1940.	Google Books		Internet Archive
Idaho	Idaho: A Guide in Word and Pictures. Caldwell, ID: Caxton Printers. 1937.			Internet Archive
Illinois	Illinois: A Descriptive and Historical Guide. Chicago: A.C. McClurg & Co. 1939.	Google Books		Internet Archive
Indiana	Indiana: a Guide to the Hoosier State. New York: Oxford University Press. 1941.	Google Books	HathiTrust	
Iowa	Iowa: a Guide to the Hawkeye State, New York: Viking, 1938	Google Books	HathiTrust	
Kansas	Kansas: A Guide to the Sunflower State, 1939.	Google Books	HathiTrust	Internet Archive
Kentucky	Kentucky: a Guide to the Bluegrass State. New York: Harcourt, Brace and Company. 1939.	Google Books	HathiTrust	Internet Archive
Louisiana	Louisiana: a Guide to the State. NY: Hastings House. 1941.	Google Books	HathiTrust	
Maine	Maine: a Guide 'Down East'. Boston: Houghton Mifllin. 1937.	Google Books	HathiTrust	
Maryland	Maryland: a Guide to the Old Line State. New York: Oxford University Press. 1940.	Google Books	HathiTrust	
Massachusetts	Massachusetts: a Guide to its Places and People, Boston: Houghton Mifflin, 1937	Google Books	HathiTrust	Internet Archive
Michigan	Michigan: a Guide to the Wolverine State. New York: Oxford University Press. 1941.	Google Books		
Minnesota	A State Guide, 1938	Google Books		Internet Archive
Mississippi	Mississippi: A Guide to the Magnolia State, New York: Viking Press, 1938	1938 ed. via Google Books	HathiTrust	Internet Archive
Missouri	Missouri: A Guide to the 'Show Me' State, New York: Duell, Sloan and Pearce, 1941	Google Books	HathiTrust	Internet Archive
Montana	Montana: a State Guide Book. NY: Viking Press. 1939.		HathiTrust	Internet Archive
Nebraska	Nebraska: A Guide to the Cornhusker State, 1939	Google Books	HathiTrust	
Nevada	Nevada: a Guide to the Silver State, Portland, Oregon: Binfords & Mort, 1957	1940 ed. via Google Books	HathiTrust	
New Hampshire	New Hampshire: a Guide to the Granite State. Boston: Houghton Mifflin. 1938. ISBN 9780403021796.	Google Books	HathiTrust	
New Jersey	New Jersey: a Guide to its Present and Past. NY: Hastings House. 1946.	1939 ed. via Google Books	HathiTrust	
New Mexico	New Mexico: a Guide to the Colorful State. NY: Hastings House. 1940.	Google Books	HathiTrust	Internet Archive
New York	New York: a Guide to the Empire State. New York: Oxford University Press. 1940.		HathiTrust	Internet Archive
North Carolina	North Carolina: a Guide to the Old North State. 1939.	Google Books		Internet Archive
North Dakota	North Dakota: a Guide to the Northern Prairie State, State Historical Society of North Dakota, 1938	Google Books		
Ohio	The Ohio Guide, Oxford University Press, 1940	Google Books		Internet Archive
Oklahoma	Oklahoma: a Guide to the Sooner State, Norman: University of Oklahoma Press, 1941	Google Books		Internet Archive
Oregon	Oregon: End of the Trail. Portland: Binfords & Mort. 1951.	1940 ed. via Google Books	HathiTrust	
Pennsylvania	Pennsylvania: a Guide to the Keystone State, New York: Oxford University Press, 1940	Google Books		Internet Archive
Rhode Island	Rhode Island: A Guide to the Smallest State. Boston: Houghton Mifflin Company. 1937. OCLC 691847.	Google Books	HathiTrust	Internet Archive
South Carolina	South Carolina: a Guide to the Palmetto State, Boston: Houghton Mifflin, 1941		HathiTrust	Internet Archive
South Dakota	South Dakota Guide. 1938.	Google Books		Internet Archive
Tennessee	Tennessee: a Guide to the State, New York: Viking, 1939	Google Books	HathiTrust	Internet Archive
Texas	Texas: A Guide to the Lone Star State, New York: Hastings House, 1940	Google Books	HathiTrust	Internet Archive
Utah	Utah: A Guide to the State, 1941	Google Books	HathiTrust	
Vermont	Vermont: a Guide to the Green Mountain State. Cambridge, Massachusetts: Riverside Press. 1937.			Internet Archive
Virginia	Virginia: a Guide to the Old Dominion, Oxford University Press, 1941	Google Books		Internet Archive
Washington	Washington: a Guide to the Evergreen State, Portland, Oregon: Binfords & Mort, 1941, OCLC 5847836	Google Books	HathiTrust	Internet Archive
West Virginia	West Virginia: A Guide to the Mountain State. New York: Oxford University Press. 1941.	Google Books; Google Books		
Wisconsin	Wisconsin: A Guide to the Badger State, 1941	Google Books	HathiTrust	Internet Archive
Wyoming	Wyoming: a Guide to Its History, Highways and People, 1941	Google Books		

=== Cities ===
State	City	Title	Google Books	HathiTrust	Internet Archive	Other
Arkansas	North Little Rock	Guide to North Little Rock. 1936. OCLC 11575040.		Hathi		
California	Los Angeles	Los Angeles: A Guide to the City and Its Environs. 1941.		HathiTrust	Internet Archive	
California	San Diego	San Diego: A California City. 1937.		HathiTrust		
California	San Francisco	San Francisco: the Bay and its Cities. 1940.		1947 ed. via HathiTrust	Internet Archive	
California	Santa Barbara	Santa Barbara: A Guide to the Channel City and its Environs. 1941.			Internet Archive	
Delaware	Newcastle	New Castle on the Delaware. 1936.		HathiTrust		
District of Columbia	Washington	Washington, City and Capital. Washington, D.C.: Government Printing Office. 1937.		HathiTrust		
Florida	Key West	A Guide to Key West. 1941.		HathiTrust		
Florida	Miami	Planning Your Vacation in Florida; Miami and Dade County including Miami Beach and Coral Gables. 1941.			Internet Archive	
Florida	St Augustine	Seeing St. Augustine. 1937.		HathiTrust		
Georgia	Atlanta	Atlanta: A City of the Modern South. 1942. OCLC 1299312424.			Internet Archive	
Georgia	Augusta	Augusta. 1938. OCLC 1411325.		HathiTrust		
Georgia	Savannah	Savannah. 1937.		HathiTrust		
Illinois	Cairo	Cairo Guide.		HathiTrust		
Illinois	Galena			HathiTrust		
Illinois	Princeton			HathiTrust		
Iowa	Bentonsport	Bentonsport Memories		HathiTrust		
Iowa	Dubuque	A Guide to Dubuque		HathiTrust		
Iowa	Estherville	A Guide to Estherville, Iowa. 1939.		HathiTrust		
Iowa	McGregor	A Guide to McGregor. 1940.				
Kentucky	Frankfort	The Old Capitol and Frankfort Guide				
Kentucky	Henderson	Henderson: A Guide to Audubon's Home Town in Kentucky. 1941.				
Kentucky	Lexington	Lexington and the Bluegrass Country. 1938.		HathiTrust		
Kentucky	Louisville	Louisville: A Guide to Falls City. 1940.				
Louisiana	New Orleans	New Orleans City Guide. 1938.	Google Books	HathiTrust	Internet Archive	
Maine	Portland	Portland City Guide. 1940.			Internet Archive	
Nebraska	Lincoln	Lincoln City Guide. 1937.				
New Jersey	Princeton	Princeton and its Neighbors.				
New York	Albany			HathiTrust		
New York	New York City	The New York City Guide: A Comprehensive Guide to the Five Boroughs of the Metropolis; Manhattan, Brooklyn, the Bronx, Queens, and Richmond. 1939.		HathiTrust	Internet Archive	
New York	Rochester	Rochester and Monroe County. 1937.			Internet Archive	
North Dakota	Bismarck					
Ohio	Cincinnati	Cincinnati: A Guide to the Queen City and Its Neighbors. 1943.		HathiTrust		
Oklahoma	Tulsa	Tulsa: A Guide to the Oil Capital. 1938.				
Pennsylvania	Erie	Erie: A Guide to the City and County. 1938.		HathiTrust	Internet Archive	
Pennsylvania	Philadelphia	Philadelphia: A Guide to the Nation's Birthplace.			Internet Archive	
Texas	Beaumont	Beaumont: A Guide to the City and Its Environs. 1939. OCLC 1386509.				
Texas	Denison					
Texas	Corpus Christi	Corpus Christi, a History and Guide. Corpus Christi Caller-Times. 1942. OCLC 2674098.				
Texas	Houston	Houston, a History and Guide. 1942.				University of North Texas
Texas	San Antonio	San Antonio: A History and Guide.		HathiTrust		
Wisconsin	Portage			HathiTrust		

=== Counties ===
State	County	Title	Google Books	HathiTrust	Internet Archive	Other
Illinois	DuPage Co.	Du Page County: a descriptive and historical guide, 1831–1939		HathiTrust		
Kentucky	Union Co.	Union County, past and present		HathiTrust		
New York	Dutchess Co.	Dutchess County		HathiTrust		
Ohio	Muskingum Co.	Zanesville and Muskingum County		HathiTrust		
Ohio	Trumbull Co.	Warren and Trumbull County		HathiTrust		
South Carolina	Spartanburg Co.	A History of Spartanburg County		HathiTrust		
South Dakota	Miner Co.	Prairie tamers of Miner county		HathiTrust		
Virginia	Albemarle Co.	Jefferson's Albemarle, a guide to Albemarle County and the city of Charlottesville, Virginia		HathiTrust		
Virginia	Sussex Co.	Sussex county, a tale of three centuries		HathiTrust		

=== Regions and territories ===
Mount Hood: A Guide (1940)

Region	Locale	Title	Google Books	HathiTrust	Internet Archive	Other
Northeast		Bergen County Panorama. 1941.			Internet Archive	
Northeast	Berkshire Hills	The Berkshire Hills. 1939.		HathiTrust		
Northeast	Cape Cod	Cape Cod Pilot: A Loquacious Guide. 1937.				
West	Death Valley	Death Valley: A Guide. 1939.				
West		Ghost Towns of Colorado. 1947.				
West		Guide to Alaska: Last American Frontier. 1939.	Google Books			
Midwest		Guide to Cedar Rapids and Northwest Iowa. 1937.				
Northeast	Pittsburgh, Pennsylvania	Tales of Pioneer Pittsburgh. 1937.				University of Pittsburgh
Northeast	New England	Here's New England! A Guide to Vacationland. 1939.				
South		Intracoastal Waterway, Norfolk to Key West. 1937.		HathiTrust		
Midwest	Arrowhead Country	Minnesota Arrowhead Country. 1941.				
South		Mississippi Gulf Coast: Yesterday and Today, 1699-1939. 1939.		HathiTrust		
West	Monterey Peninsula	Monterey Peninsula. 1941.		HathiTrust		
West	Mount Hood	Mound Hood: A Guide. 1940.	Google Books			
Northeast		New York Panorama. 1938.			Internet Archive	
South	Ocean Highway	The Ocean Highway: New Brunswick, New Jersey to Jacksonville, Florida. 1938.				East Carolina University
South	South Carolina	Beaufort and the Sea Islands. 1938.				University of South Carolina
South	South Carolina	South Carolina State Parks. 1940.				Clemson University
Midwest; West		Oregon Trail, US 30: The Missouri River to the Pacific Ocean. 1939.	Google Books			
Insular area	Puerto Rico	Puerto Rico: a Guide to the Island of Boriquén. New York: University Society. 1940. OCLC 245805.		HathiTrust	Internet Archive	
Northeast; South	U.S. Route 1	U.S. One: Maine to Florida. 1938.		HathiTrust		

== See also ==
- Historical Records Survey
- Index of American Design
