= List of waterfalls in Yosemite National Park =

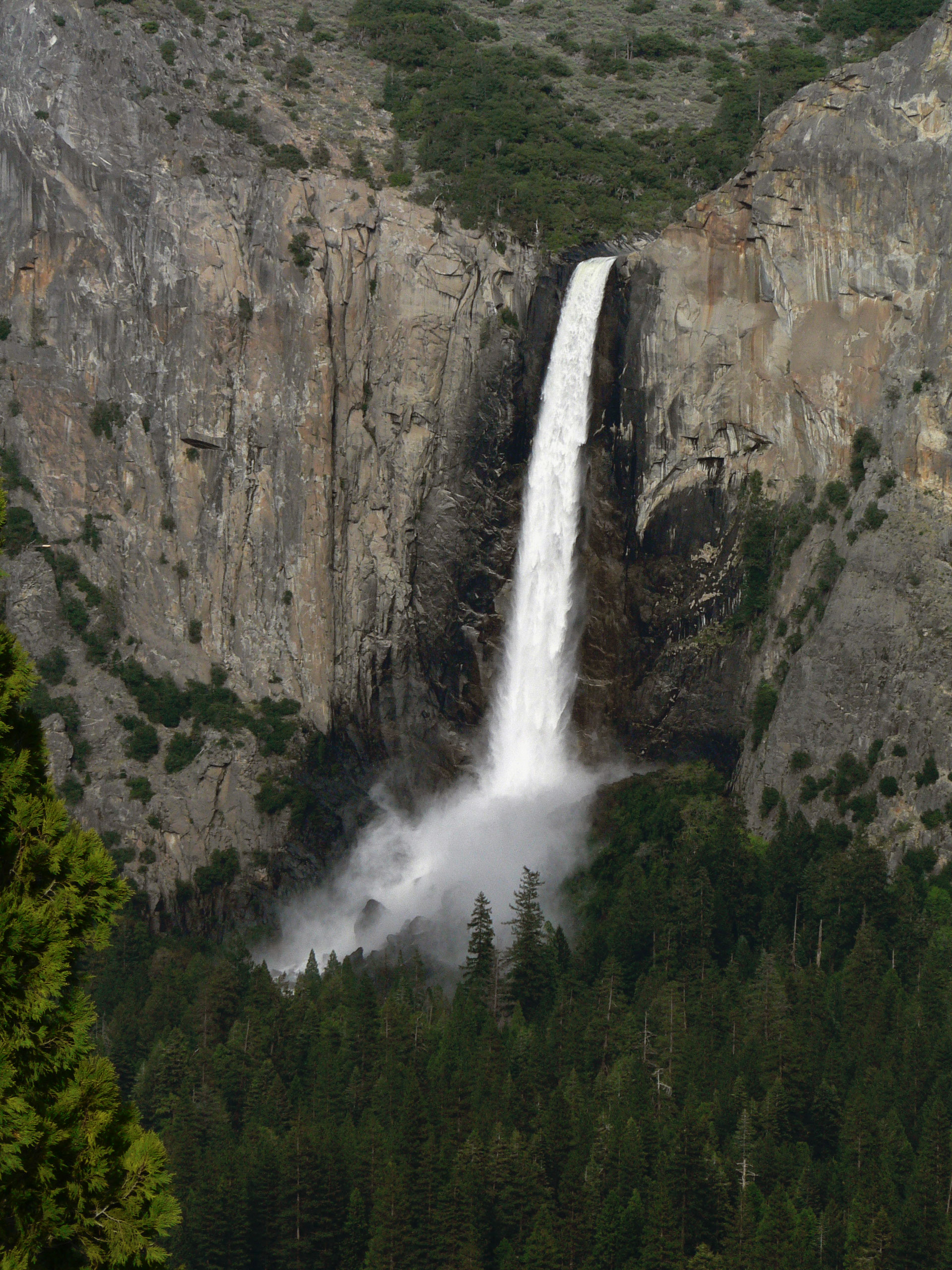
Bridalveil Fall.

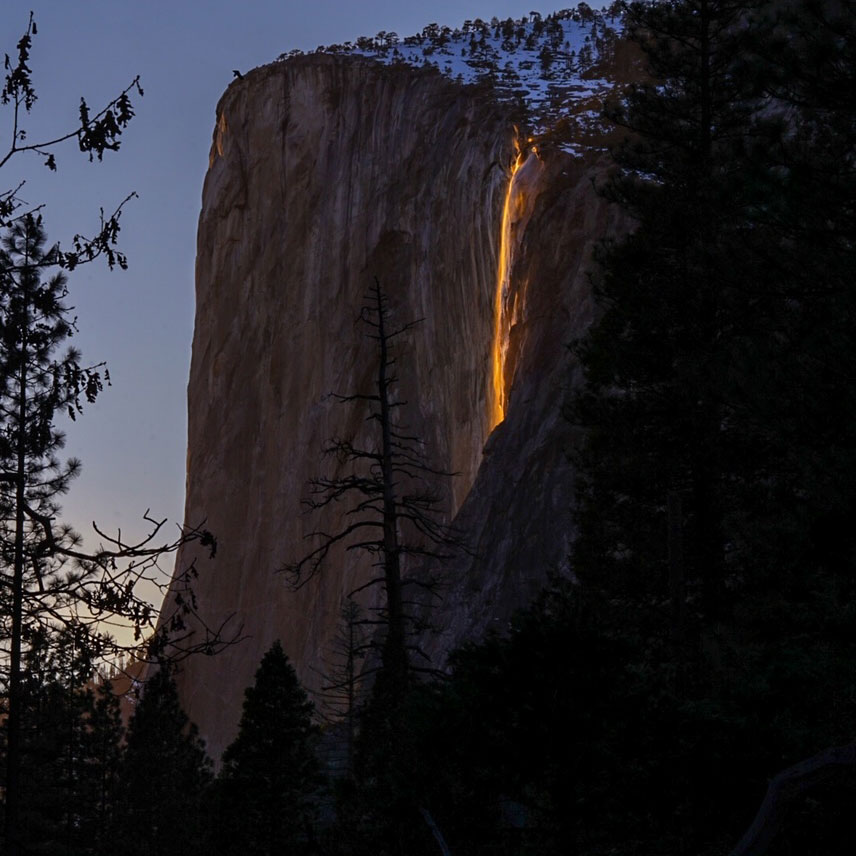
Horsetail Fall, in its Firefall display

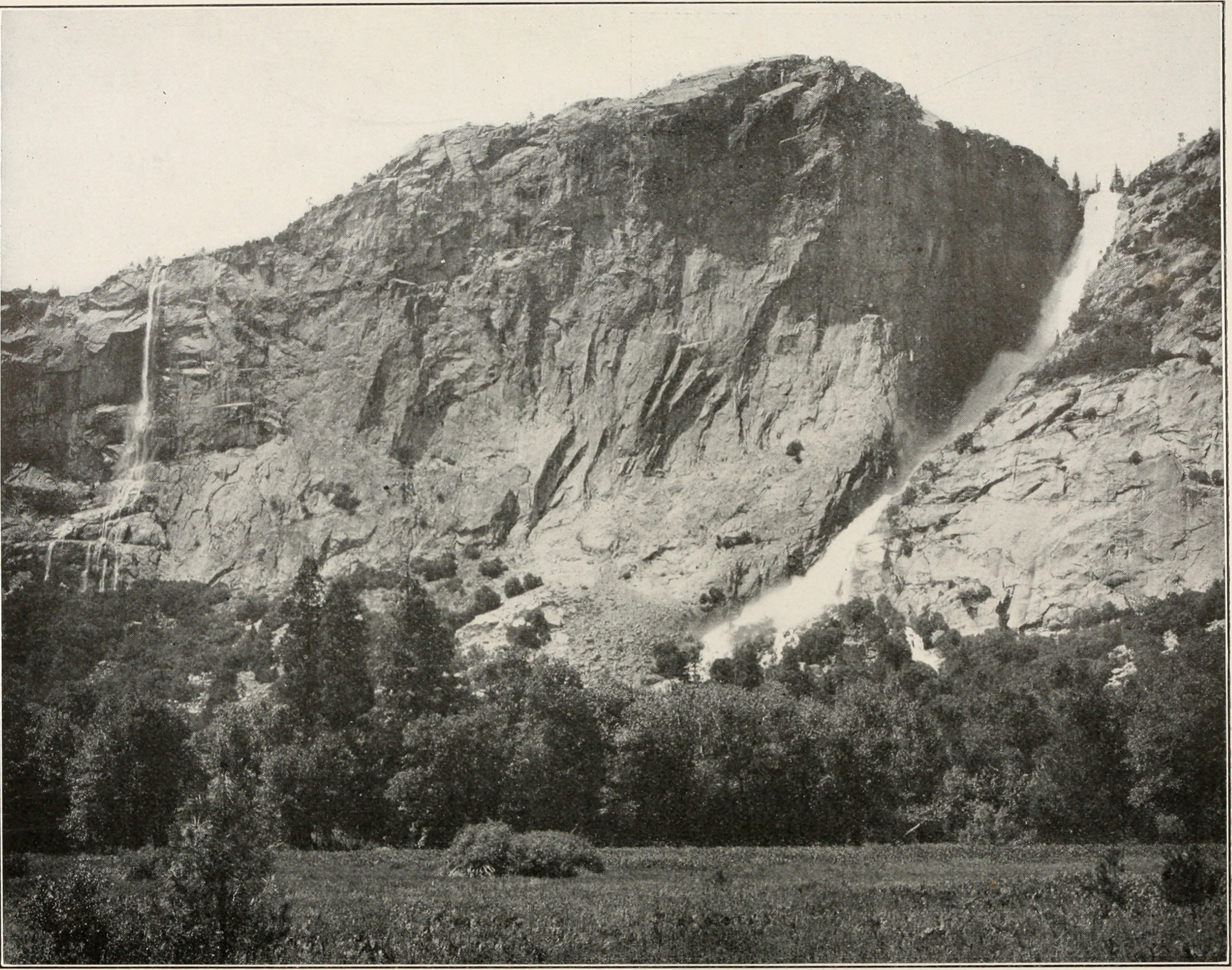
Tueeulala and Wapama Falls, in 1910 before the flooding of Hetch Hetchy Valley

The following is a list of Yosemite waterfalls, including ephemeral falls:

List of waterfalls in Yosemite
Name	Height		Coordinates
Name	Feet	Meters	Coordinates
Alder Creek Falls	100	30	37°35′27″N 119°39′38″W
Bridalveil Fall	620	190	37°43′00″N 119°38′47″W
California Fall	120	37	37°54′59″N 119°26′24″W
Chilnualna Falls	690	210	37°33′48″N 119°37′05″W
Horsetail Fall	2,100	640	37°43′45″N 119°37′42″W
Illilouette Fall	370	110	37°42′51″N 119°33′40″W
Lehamite Falls	1,180	360	37°45′45″N 119°34′44″W
LeConte Falls	229	70	37°55′24″N 119°27′06″W
Nevada Fall	594	181	37°43′29″N 119°32′00″W
Pywiack Cascade	600	180	37°47′14″N 119°29′20″W
Quaking Aspen Falls	25	7.6	37°50′46″N 119°34′22″W
Rancheria Falls	150	46	37°57′18″N 119°42′37″W
Ribbon Fall	1,612	491	37°44′09″N 119°38′54″W
Royal Arch Cascade	1,250	380	37°44′59″N 119°34′16″W
Sentinel Fall	1,920	590	37°43′40″N 119°35′48″W
Silver Strand Falls	574	175	37°42′16″N 119°40′09″W
Snow Creek Falls	2,140	650	37°46′05″N 119°32′03″W
Staircase Falls	1,020	310	37°44′07″N 119°34′30″W
Three Chute Falls	80	24	37°45′32″N 119°32′12″W
Tueeulala Falls	840	260	37°57′51″N 119°46′22″W
Tuolumne Fall	128	39	37°54′21″N 119°25′04″W
Vernal Fall	317	97	37°43′39″N 119°32′38″W
Wapama Falls	1,700	520	37°58′02″N 119°45′56″W
Waterwheel Falls	300	91	37°55′38″N 119°27′32″W
White Cascade	105	32	37°54′29″N 119°25′10″W
Wildcat Falls	630	190	37°43′24″N 119°43′01″W
Yosemite Falls	2,425	739	37°45′25″N 119°35′48″W
