= Quaking Aspen Falls =

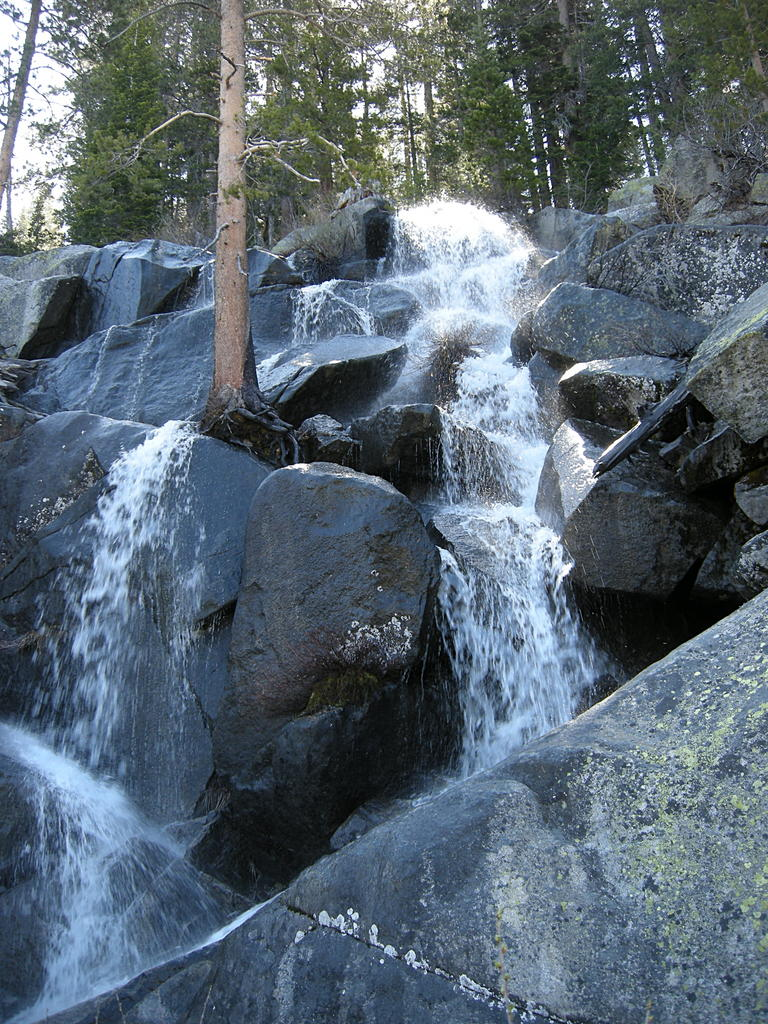
- Interactive map of Quaking Aspen Falls
- Location: On Tioga Road near Yosemite Creek, Yosemite National Park
- Coordinates: 37°50.8′N 119°34.3′W
- Type: Segmented
- Total height: 75 ft (23 m)
- Number of drops: 1

Quaking Aspen Falls (also called Tioga Pass Falls) is a 75-foot, multi-stranded waterfall off Tioga Pass Road in Yosemite National Park. Although the falls typically dry up by August, the stream flows year-round both above and below the falls.

== Characteristics ==
The falls drop 75 feet in a segmented or splayed/horsetail form, directly adjacent to Highway 120. It is fed by snowmelt from a small, narrow drainage basin containing a tiny lake at its head, which helps extend its flow slightly beyond pure runoff. The stream is a direct tributary to Yosemite Creek, joining it a short distance downstream.

While the falls have never been officially named, the most common used names center around the aspen trees, which grow immediately to the left of the falls, and are often seen shimmering in the wind generated by the falls. Other unofficial names include Tioga Pass Falls and Yosemite Creek Falls.

The waterfall is ephemeral, typically flowing best in late spring/early summer and drying up by mid-June to August (depending on snowpack), though the stream runs year-round above and below the falls. Its prominence comes from its roadside visibility rather than size or form. In fact, the falls are so close to the highway that water splashes onto the road during peak flow.

== See also ==
- List of waterfalls
- List of waterfalls in Yosemite National Park
