= A. D. Greer =

American artist and writer

- Born: Aubrey Dale Greer; Oklahoma Territory, U.S.

Aubrey Dale Greer (1904 - 1998) was an American artist, poet, lecturer, and illustrator. His images of the American West brought him public attention and critical acclaim.

== Life ==
Greer was born in Oklahoma Territory, and in 1907, after the death of his mother, was taken to Hutchinson, Kansas where he grew up on a farm. He studied at St. Johns Academy in Salina, Kansas and then began work as a sign painter. Although many suffered financially during the Great Depression, he had numerous jobs painting church domes, lettering signs on water towers and smokestacks, and striping cars at a Ford assembly plant. He also worked as a logger in Colorado.

Greer became a legend among Texas landscape painters because of his popularity and the high-dollar values of his luminist, romantic paintings.

Greer's detailed paintings and prints of vast natural landscapes of Yosemite Falls and the Grand Canyon caught the attention of the International Art Publishing Company of Detroit in 1934, and he became a nationally known artist overnight. Greer's renderings include commissioned works for Will Rogers and a piece he entitled "Cattle Country", which Lyndon B. Johnson so liked that he bought it and hung it in the White House.

== Works ==
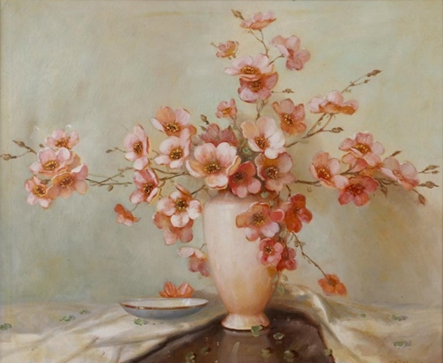
"Wild Roses" Oil on Canvas, A.D. Greer

In the delicate still life "Wild Roses," Greer departs from his better-known Western landscapes to explore the quiet lyricism of floral arrangement. A porcelain vase brimming with soft pink wild rose blossoms sits atop a white-draped table. The petals, rendered with Greer's signature precision and tonal subtlety, seem to glow against a muted green background. A small dish with fallen petals rests beside the vase, introducing a note of impermanence and naturalism.
