= Royal Arch Cascade =

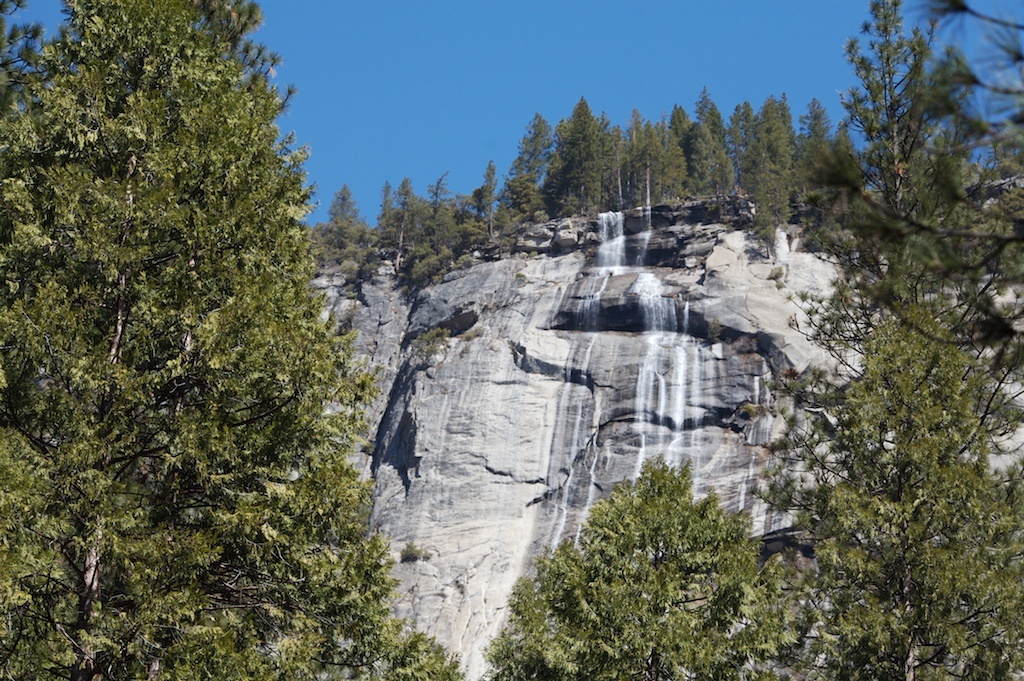
- The Royal Arch Cascade viewed from the Ahwahnee Bridge.
- Interactive map of Royal Arch Cascade
- Location: Yosemite Valley, Yosemite NP, CA, US
- Coordinates: 37°44′59″N 119°34′16″W
- Type: Horsetail
- Total height: 1,250 ft (380 m)
- Number of drops: 1
- World height ranking: 170

Royal Arch Cascade is a waterfall located on the north wall of Yosemite Valley and the Yosemite National Park, United States, within walking distance from the Ahwahnee Hotel. The falls are 1,250 feet (380 m) high and are usually dry by June. The waterfall gets its name from its location immediately adjacent to the Royal Arches, which are a series of concentric semicircular setbacks in the cliff face directly opposite Glacier Point. The waterfall lacks a plunge pool and its flow is relatively gentle, making the base of the falls a popular photo spot.

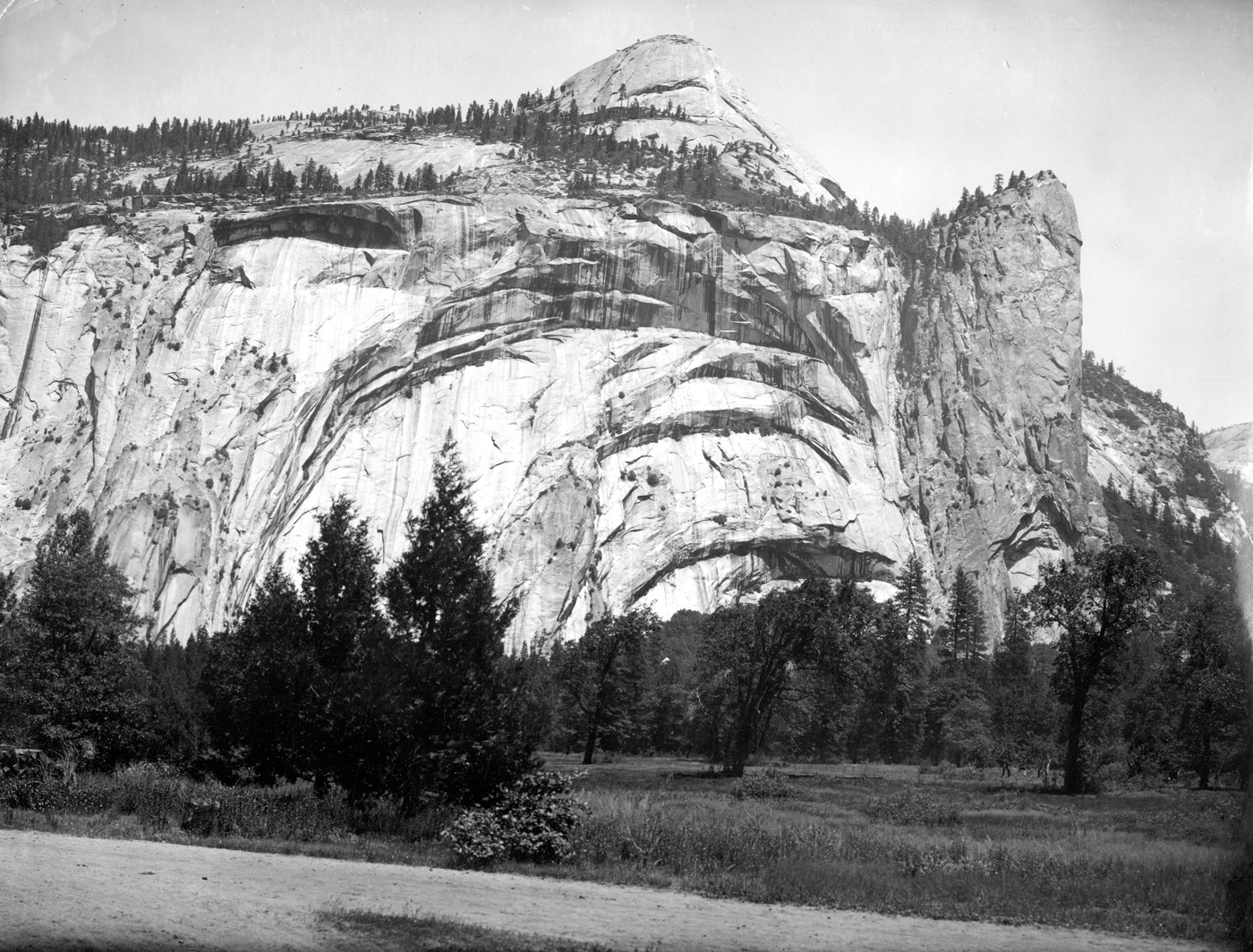
Royal Arches and Washington Column surmounted by North Dome.

== See also ==
- List of waterfalls
- List of waterfalls in Yosemite National Park
