= North Dome =

Granite dome in Yosemite National Park, USA

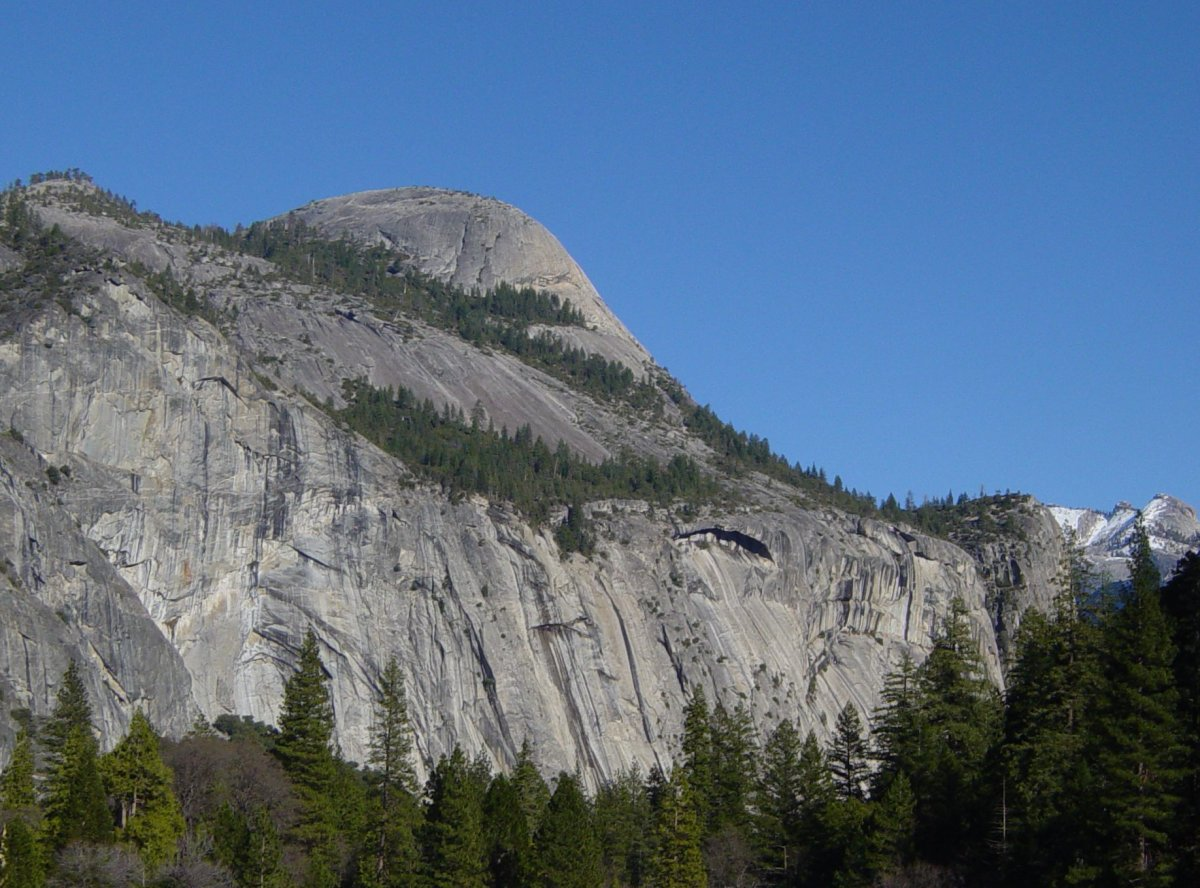
- Royal Arches and North Dome (top) as seen from Yosemite Valley.

Highest point
- Elevation: 7,546 ft (2,300 m) NAVD 88
- Coordinates: 37°45′25″N 119°33′36″W

Geography
- Location within California Location within the United States
- Location: Yosemite National Park, Mariposa County, California, U.S.
- Parent range: Sierra Nevada
- Topo map: USGS Yosemite Falls

Geology
- Rock age: Cretaceous
- Mountain type: Granite dome

Climbing
- Easiest route: Trail hike from the north, class 1

North Dome is a granite dome in Yosemite National Park, California. It is the southernmost summit of Indian Ridge, 0.6 miles (1.0 km) north of Washington Column and the Royal Arches on the northeastern wall of Yosemite Valley. It can be reached by trail from the Tioga Pass Road, or by going up the Yosemite Falls trail and heading east. It can also be reached from Mirror Lakes by the Snow Creek Falls trail going north around Indian Rock and then south again on the Tioga Pass Road trail. The South Face is precipitous.

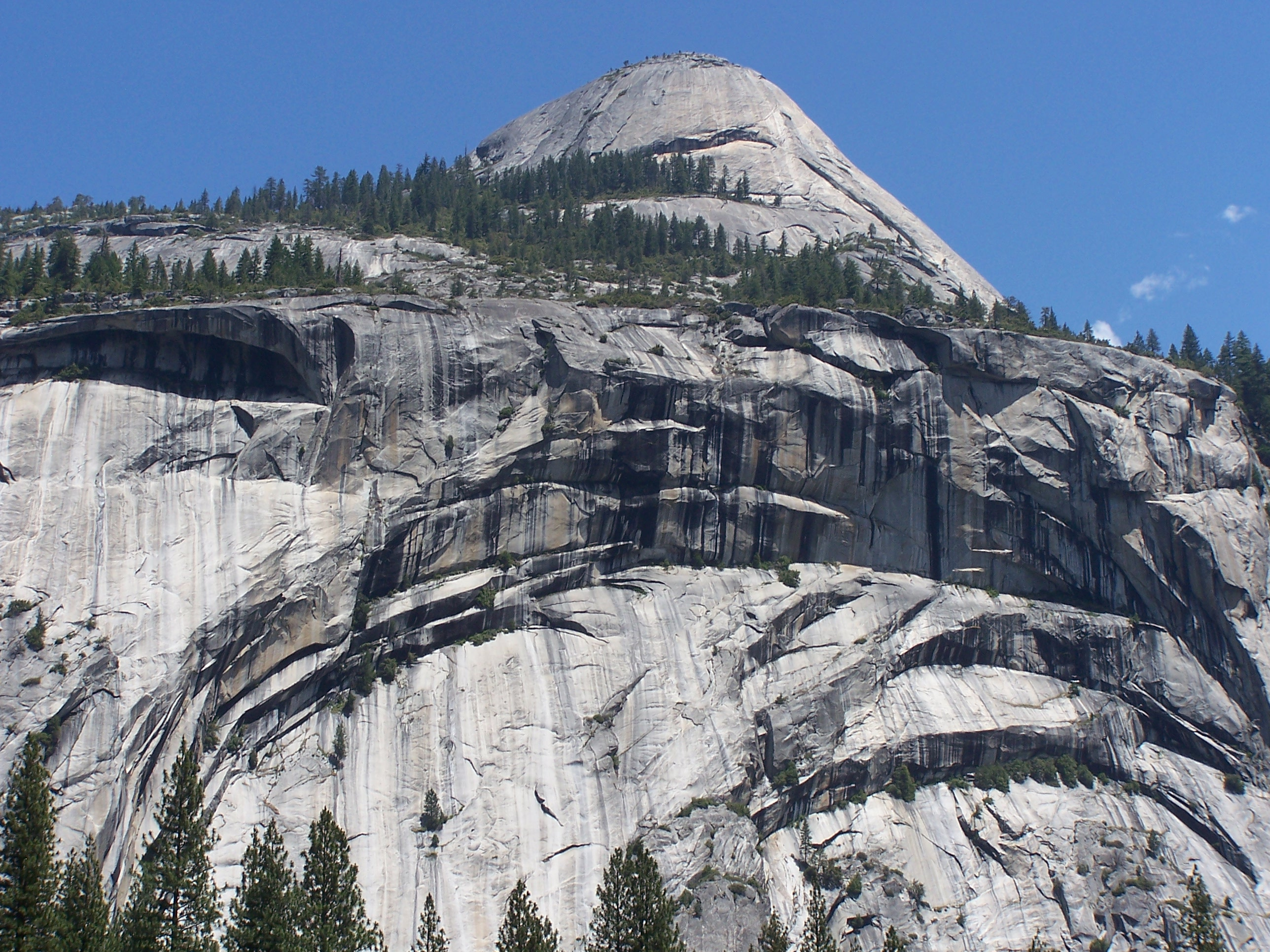
Looking up at North Dome from the Valley
