= Snow Creek Falls =

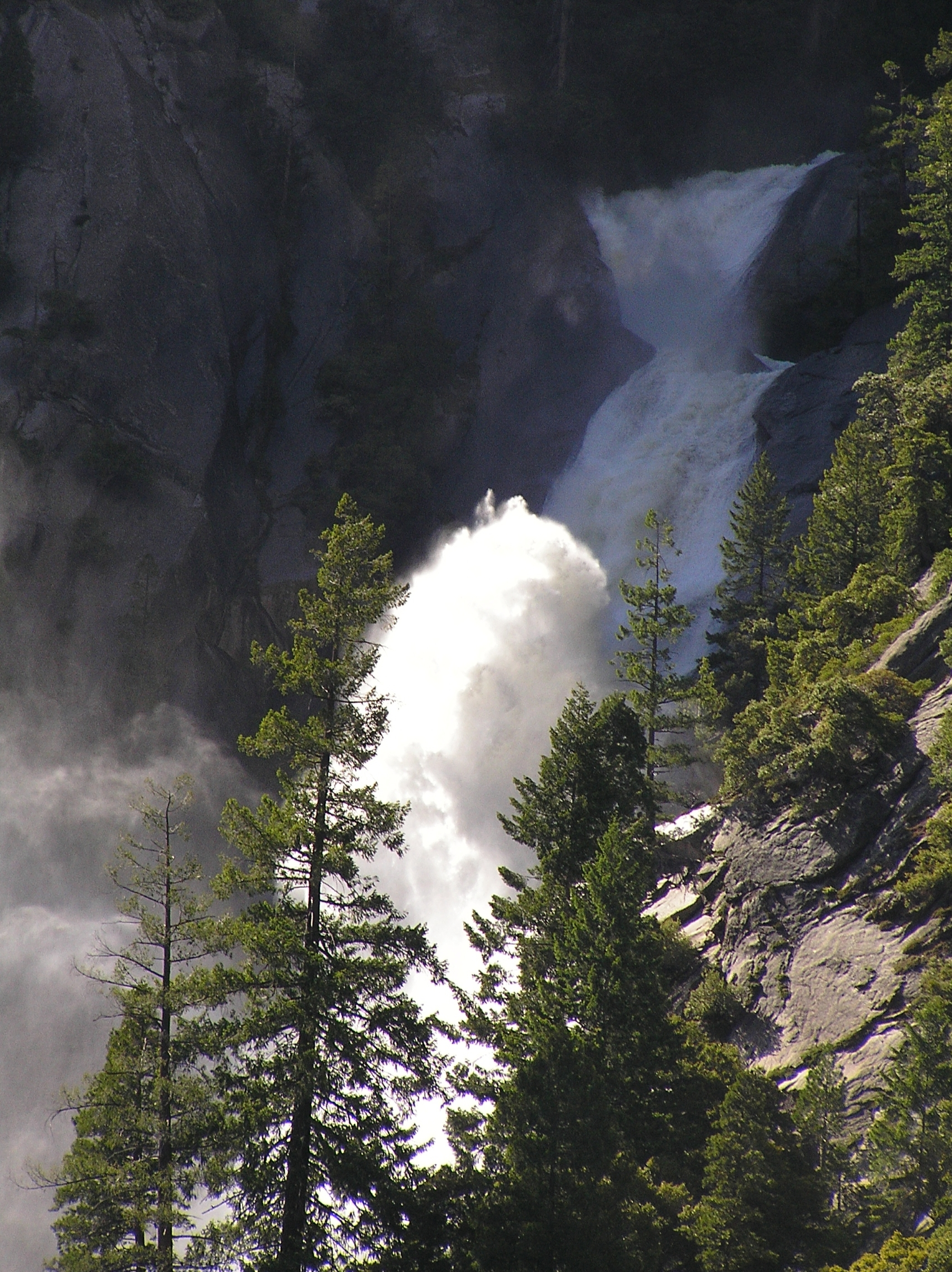
- Interactive map of Snow Creek Falls
- Location: Yosemite Valley, Yosemite NP, CA, US
- Coordinates: 37°46′05″N 119°32′03″W
- Type: Tiered
- Total height: 2,140 ft (650 m)
- Number of drops: 7
- Longest drop: 500 ft (150 m)
- World height ranking: 39

Snow Creek Falls is a long series of cascades located in Yosemite National Park toward the eastern extent of Yosemite Valley. It descends a steep gorge on a sizeable stream that originates in May Lake to the north, dropping east of the trail that leaves the Valley above Mirror Lake en route to North Dome and other north-rim destinations. Snow Creek Falls is the second highest waterfall in Yosemite National Park.

== See also ==
- List of waterfalls
- List of waterfalls in Yosemite National Park
