= Royal Arches =

Cliff in Yosemite National Park, US

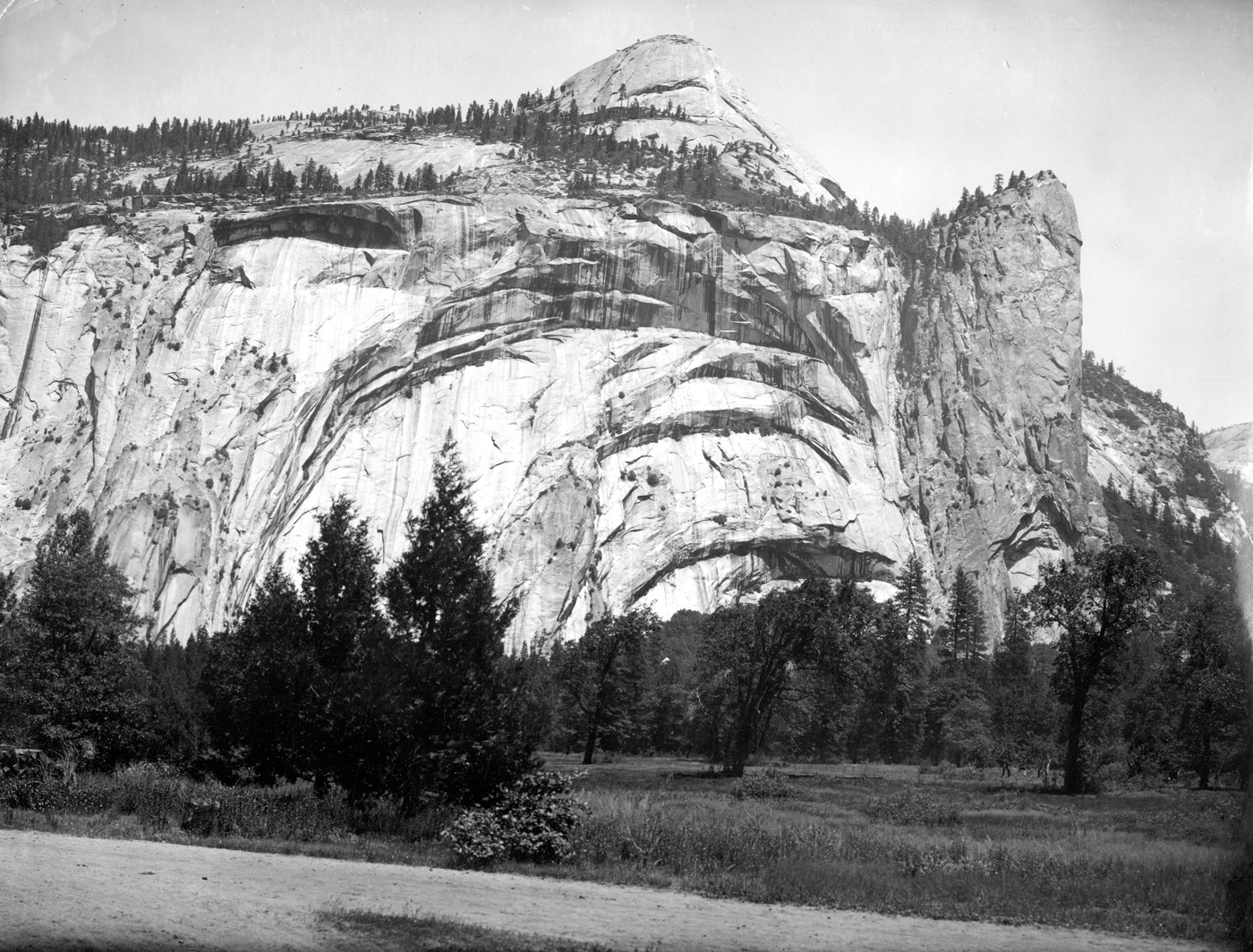
Royal Arches and Washington Column surmounted by North Dome.

The Royal Arches is a cliff containing natural occurring granite exfoliation arches, located below North Dome and rising above Yosemite Valley, in Yosemite National Park, California. (37.74840°N 119.569°W). These are not literal arches, but rather arch shaped indentations in the cliff face.

The Royal Arches are located on the north side of the valley, northeast of the Ahwahnee Hotel. Adjacent to the Royal Arches is the Royal Arch Cascade waterfall. Washington Column is just to the east, and North Dome is above.

== Etymology ==
Native American names recorded for the formation include "Scho-ko-ni" (or "Cho-ko-nip-o-deh"), which roughly translates to "baby basket" or the shade for one. One student of the language suggested "Cho-ko-ni" means "dog house"; while an account by Bancroft list the name "Hun-to", meaning "watching eye."

== Geology and rockfall risk ==
The Royal Arches, like many areas of Yosemite Valley, is prone to rockfall from the nearly vertical cliffs that surround the valley. Factors long known to trigger rockfall on steep cliffs include "precipitation, seismic activity and freezing conditions". Research conducted at the Royal Arches by scientists with the United States Geological Survey and the National Park Service analyzed the additional role of very hot weather on exfoliation. The researchers installed motion sensors in the crack behind a slab of granite on the Royal Arches that measures 19 meters tall, 4 meters wide, and 10 centimeters thick, and monitored the rock movement for 3 1/2 years. They learned that the crack could open up as much as nearly half an inch on unusually hot days. The researchers concluded that "Our data indicate that the warmest times of the day and year are particularly conducive to triggering rockfalls, and that cyclic thermal forcing may enhance the efficacy of other, more typical rockfall triggers."

In August, 2023, the National Park Service announced that "Rock climbers recently reported a new crack in a cliff on the western side of Royal Arches, near the climbing route Super Slide. Subsequent investigation revealed that this crack has partially detached a large pillar of rock, and that cracking was actively occurring." On August 6, a mountain guide working for the Yosemite Mountaineering School climbed in the area and saw nothing out of the ordinary. On August 20, the same guide discovered the crack. Park ranger Jesse McGahey reported that "the following week a climbing ranger and a geologist observed it firsthand and they could hear it cracking like a frozen lake that wasn’t consolidated". Park geologist Greg Stock and a climbing ranger examined the crack and "heard continuous creaking noises and witnessed many rock chips falling out of the crack". By September 7, the crack had grown by 12 feet in length, and was wider.

As a result, the National Park Service closed down climbing access on the west side of the Royal Arches "as a precautionary effort to reduce risk from rockfall". A section of a hiking trail was also closed, and a detour was established.

== Rock climbing ==
The Royal Arches, like much of the Yosemite area, feature a great choice of rock climbing sites. The Royal Arches climbing area spans from the Church Bowl to Washington Column. The Royal Arches Route is recognized in the historic climbing text Fifty Classic Climbs of North America. This route, despite its name, is located hundreds of yards east of the Royal Arches. The first ascent was by Kenneth Davis, Morgan Harris and Ken Adam on October 9, 1936. (pages 230 - 235)

Other popular climbing routes on the Royal Arches itself include Super Slide, Peruvian Flake West, Rhombus Wall, Serenity Crack and Sons of Yesterday.

== See also ==
- Landforms of Yosemite National Park
