= Wildcat Falls =

- Interactive map of Wildcat Falls
- Location: Yosemite National Park, Mariposa County, California, United States
- Coordinates: 37°43′24″N 119°43′01″W
- Type: Tiered
- Total height: 720 feet (220 m)
- Number of drops: 7
- Longest drop: 120 feet (37 m)
- World height ranking: 367

Wildcat Falls is located in the western quarter of Yosemite National Park alongside Highway 140, approximately 2.8 miles inside the park from the Arch Rock Entrance. It consists of a relatively thin string of falls and cascades totaling 720 feet (some sources list 630 feet), and only flows until about May or June. There are a total of seven drops in the waterfall, the longest being 120 feet. The base of the waterfall is a mossy grotto that is easily reached on foot and is a popular location among photographers.

== See also ==
- List of waterfalls
- List of waterfalls in Yosemite National Park
