= Binford & Mort =

Publisher based in Oregon, United States

- Status: Active
- Founded: 1930; 95 years ago
- Founder: Maurice M. Binford; Peter Binford
- Country of origin: United States
- Headquarters location: Hillsboro, Oregon; 45.5292905°N 122.9316473°W
- Publication types: Books
- Nonfiction topics: Pacific Northwest history
- Fiction genres: Non-fiction

Binford & Mort Publishing is a book publishing company located in Hillsboro, Oregon, United States. Founded in 1930, the company was previously known as Metropolitan Press and Binfords & Mort. At one time they were the largest book publisher in the Pacific Northwest. The privately owned company focuses on books from the Pacific Northwest, and has printed many important titles covering Oregon's history.

== History ==
Maurice M. Binford was born in Indiana in 1878, but moved west in 1884 after his parents died. Peter A. Binford, also from Indiana, was born on March 23, 1876, in Crawfordsville in the west-central part of that state. Peter and Maurice moved to Klickitat County, Washington, in 1884 with their older sister Julia, who had married Frank Lee. Julia raised the two along with five other younger siblings.

Peter later worked in the printing industry in Klickitat County for his brother in law Lee at several newspapers. In 1891, Maurice and his brother Peter moved to Portland and worked for Lee at Lee's company, Metropolitan Printing Company. In 1899, the brothers purchased the printing company from Lee. Maurice served as the company's secretary and treasurer in the early years.

In 1920, Ralph Mort, their nephew, was added to the company. They established a publishing company in 1930 under the name of Metropolitan Press, and published Northwest books, primarily history titles. Some of these books were re-prints of titles that were no longer protected by copyright, while others were new titles by Oregon authors. Early authors included Thomas Nelson Strong, Charles Henry Carey, Howard McKinley Corning, and Frederic Homer Balch among others. The company became the first large publisher in Oregon.

During the Great Depression, the company acquired the rights to print the American Guide Series guidebooks created by the Works Progress Administration's Writers Project for Utah, Washington, Nevada, and Oregon, which proved very profitable. In 1938, the Binfords changed the named to Binfords & Mort after taking on Ralph Mort as a new partner in the business. Publishing house William Morrow and Company suggested this name change as they wanted a more original name as they took on national distribution of the Binfords' titles.

Maurice died in 1954. Peter retired from the company by 1957, and he died on October 19, 1959. The name of the company was then changed to Binford & Mort, and its ownership passed to Thomas P. Binford (b. 1914), who was Peter's son and Maurice's nephew. taking over for his father Maurice. From its founding until about 1960, the company's publications did much to promote works and authors from the Pacific Northwest. By 1957, they were the largest book publisher in the Northwest and had more than 350 titles.

The company's name was altered slightly in 1973, from Binfords & Mort to Binford & Mort, after Thomas Binford bought out all other interests.

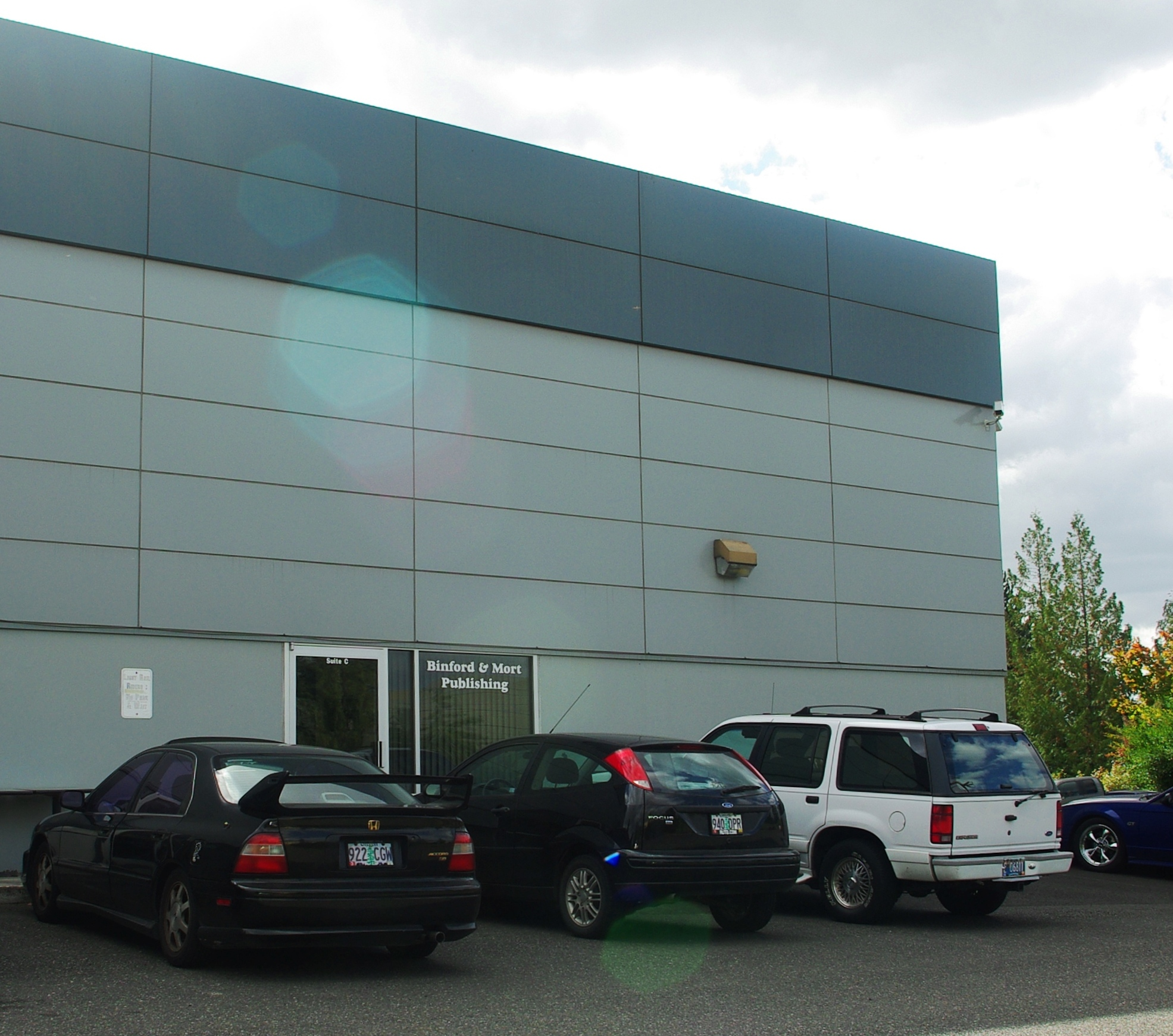
Headquarters in Hillsboro

After the older Binfords left, Thomas failed to maintain the quality of the editorial process for new books. Thus, even though Binford & Mort averaged ten new titles a year, the quality suffered. By 1980, the company had moved to Salem. Thomas died in 1983 and Binford & Mort was purchased by the Gardeniers of Hillsboro.

By 1996 they had relocated to Portland, and by 2000 Binford & Mort was in Hillsboro. By that time P. L. Gardenier served as editor and they focused on works of non-fiction, while also printing books for self-publishers. Today the company still publishes some new titles, and continues to re-print its older titles. Described as "Portland's most venerable general trade publisher," many of the works they published are considered to be definitive books on their topics. These include Oregon Geographic Names by Lewis A. McArthur, A General History of Oregon by Charles Henry Carey, Howard McKinley Corning's Dictionary of Oregon History, History of Oregon Literature by Alfred Powers, and George S. Turnbull's History of Oregon Newspapers. As of 2009, Polly Gardenier served as the director of the three person company that had annual revenues of $200,000.

== Selected titles ==
- Balch, Frederic Homer (1965). Bridge of the Gods. Binfords & Mort. ISBN 1-110-01297-7. OCLC 1834541.
- Dobbs, Caroline C. (1932). Men of Champoeg: A Record of the Lives of the Pioneers Who Founded the Oregon Government. Metropolitan Press.
- Frank, Gerry (1980). Gerry Frank's Where to Find it, Buy it, Eat it, and Save Time and Money in New York. Binford & Mort. ISBN 0-8323-0356-9.
- Gibbs, James A. (1955). Sentinels of the North Pacific. Binfords & Mort. ISBN 0-8323-0011-X. OCLC 431414548.
- Snyder, Eugene E. (1989). We Claimed This Land: Portland's Pioneer Settlers. Binford & Mort. ISBN 0-8323-0471-9.
- Strong, Thomas Nelson (1906). Cathlamet on the Columbia. Binfords & Mort. OCLC 5780594.
- Tetlow, Roger T.; Graham J. Barbey (1990). The Story of a Pioneer Columbia River Salmon Packer. Binford & Mort. ISBN 0-8323-0478-6.
- Writers' Program of the Work Projects Administration in the State of Oregon (1940). Oregon: End of the Trail. American Guide Series. Portland, Oregon: Binfords & Mort. OCLC 4874569.
