= Yosemite Creek =

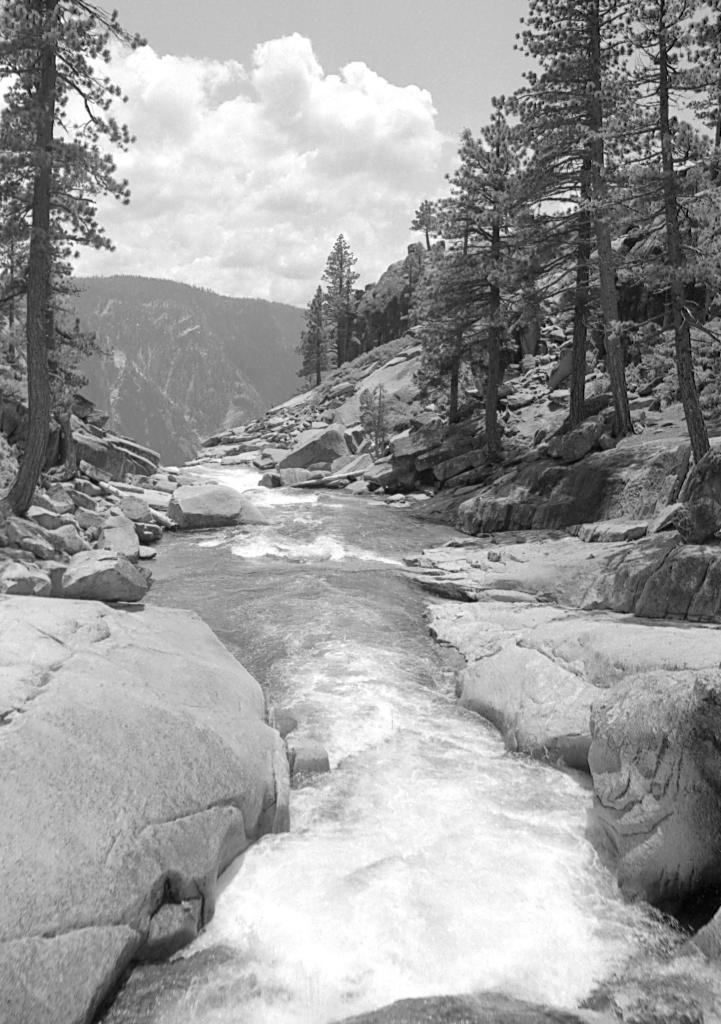
- Yosemite Creek above its falls, c. 1981

Physical characteristics
- Length: 24 km (15 mi)
- Basin size: 110 km^{2} (42 sq mi)

Yosemite Creek is a 15-mile-long (24 km) creek of the Sierra Nevada, located in Yosemite National Park, Mariposa County, California, United States.

== Geography ==
The creek's headwaters are at the Grant Lakes (37.90103°N 119.54072°W), and it flows southwest to drop 2,425 feet (739 m) over Yosemite Falls to Yosemite Valley, then flows southeast to its mouth at the Merced River, just southwest of Yosemite Village. (37.74243°N 119.59461°W) The Merced is a tributary of the San Joaquin River, in the San Joaquin Valley.

Today, Yosemite Creek flows over the Yosemite Valley rim to create Upper Yosemite Fall. Before its diversion about 130,000 years ago, Yosemite Creek flowed down an older channel just to the west, from which it cascaded down through the steep ravine that is now the route of the Yosemite Falls Trail.

== Hydrology ==
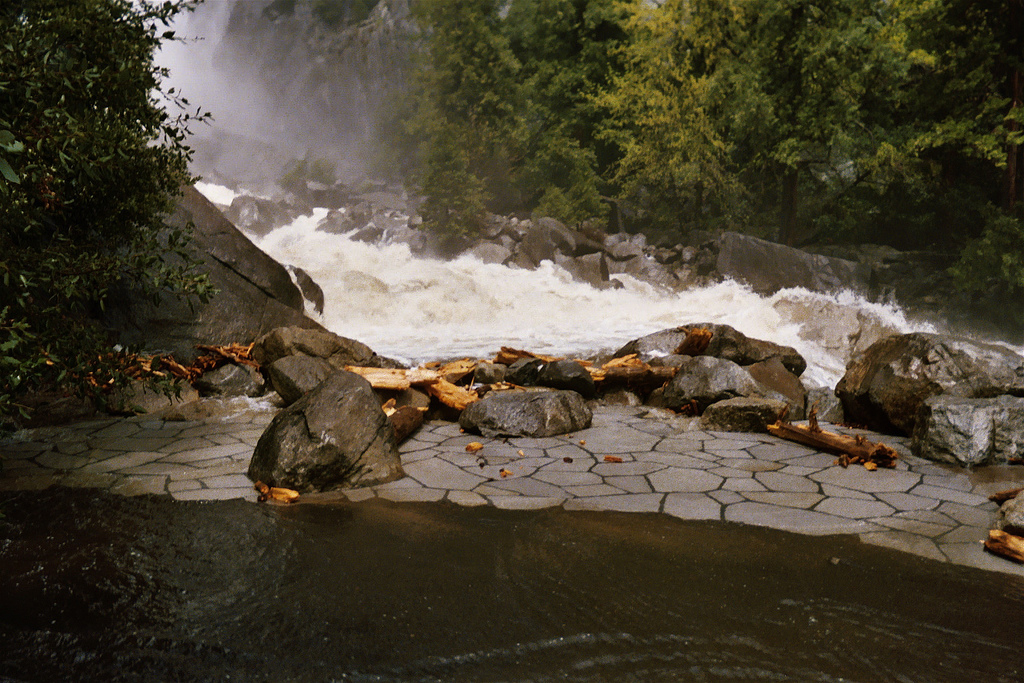
Yosemite Creek flooding its channel in Yosemite Valley (2005).

The Yosemite Creek watershed, which feeds the creek and Yosemite Falls, contains 43 square miles (110 km^{2}). It is largely a granite basin that was scraped clean of soil by glaciers. Because of the shallow soil base, the Yosemite Creek watershed has little capacity to hold water, so it quickly drains as the snow melts.

== See also ==
- Yosemite Falls
- Geology of the Yosemite area
- Yosemite Valley
