= Washington Column =

Rock formation at Yosemite Valley, Yosemite National Park

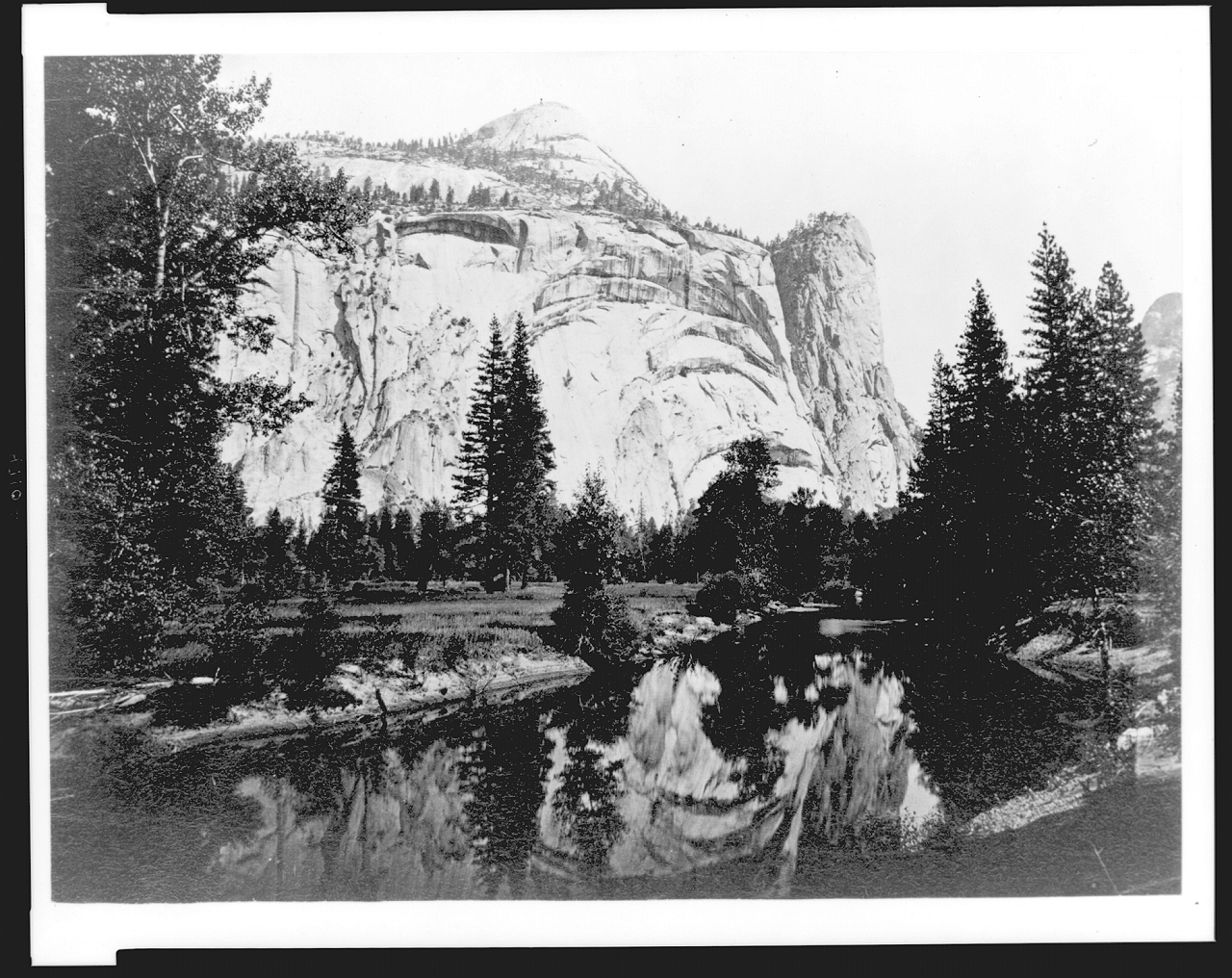
- Reflection of trees and Washington Column in lake. North Dome is above, left of Washington Column

Highest point
- Elevation: 6,347 ft (1,935 m) NAVD 88
- Coordinates: 37°45′00″N 119°33′36″W

Geography
- Location: Yosemite National Park, Mariposa County, California, U.S.
- Parent range: Sierra Nevada
- Topo map: USGS Washington Column

Geology
- Rock age: Cretaceous
- Mountain type: Granite dome

Climbing
- Easiest route: Trail hike from the north, class 1

Washington Column is a roughly 1800-foot high rock formation, arising from Yosemite Valley. It is east of the Royal Arches, behind the Ahwahnee Hotel. North Dome is above it. Washington Column can be viewed from many points in Yosemite Valley, including the trail to Mirror Lake.

Washington Column has numerous rock climbing routes. The first climbing ascent of Washington Column was made in 1935 by Morgan Harris, Dick Leonard, and Jack Riegelhuth, via a route they called the Piton Traverse. Climbing historian Steve Roper later wrote that the precise line of the original route was no longer known.
