= Yosemite Falls =

Waterfall in California, United States

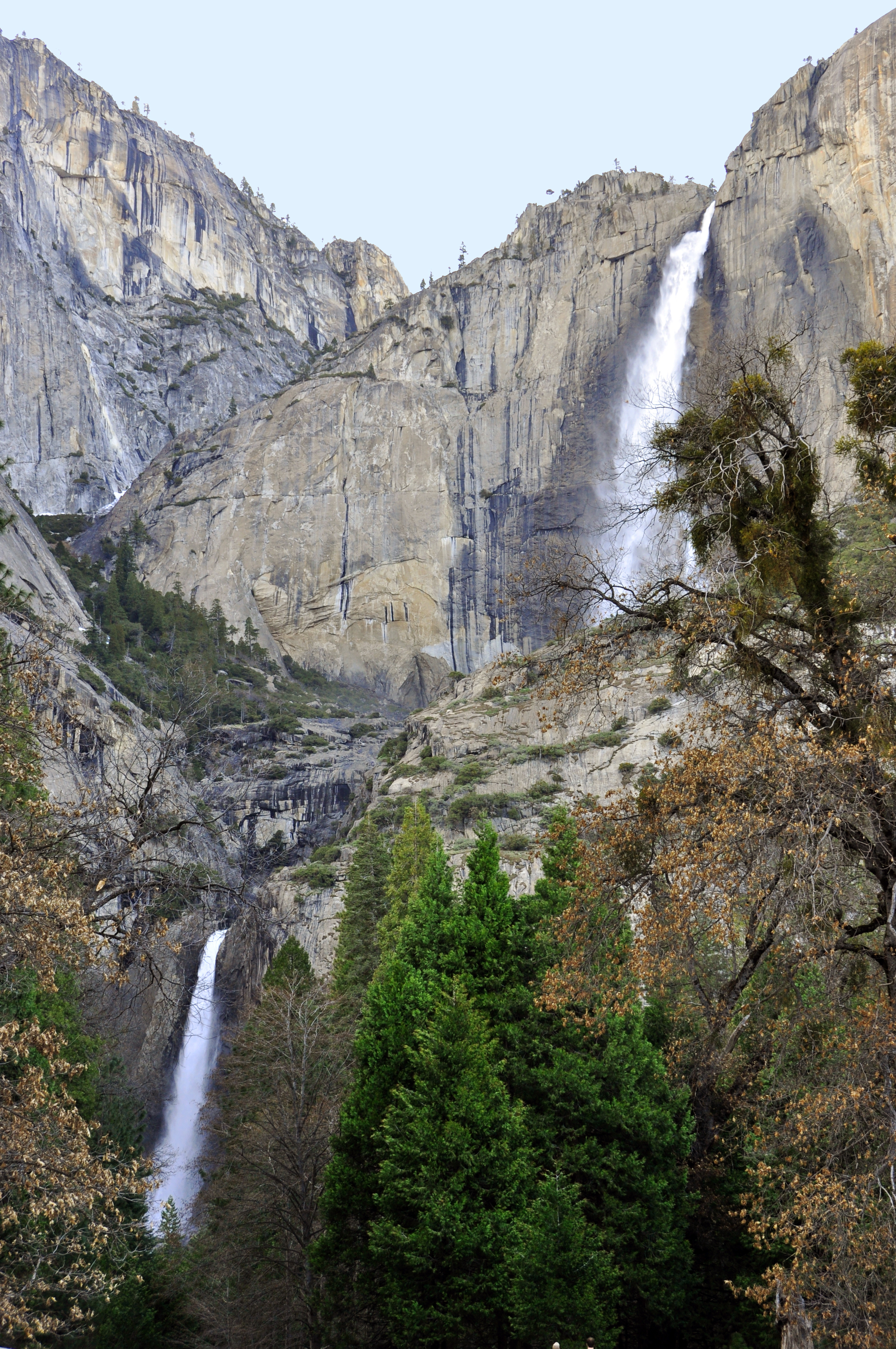
- Upper and lower cascades of Yosemite Falls, as seen from Yosemite Valley.
- Interactive map of Yosemite Falls
- Location: Yosemite Valley, Yosemite National Park, California, U.S.
- Coordinates: 37°45′25″N 119°35′48″W
- Type: Tiered
- Total height: 2,425 ft (739 m)
- Number of drops: 6
- Longest drop: 1,430 ft (436 m)
- Watercourse: Yosemite Creek

Yosemite Falls is the highest waterfall in Yosemite National Park, dropping a total of 2,425 feet (739 m) from the top of the upper fall to the base of the lower fall. Located in the Sierra Nevada of California, it is a major attraction in the park, especially in late spring when the water flow is at its peak.

== Sections ==
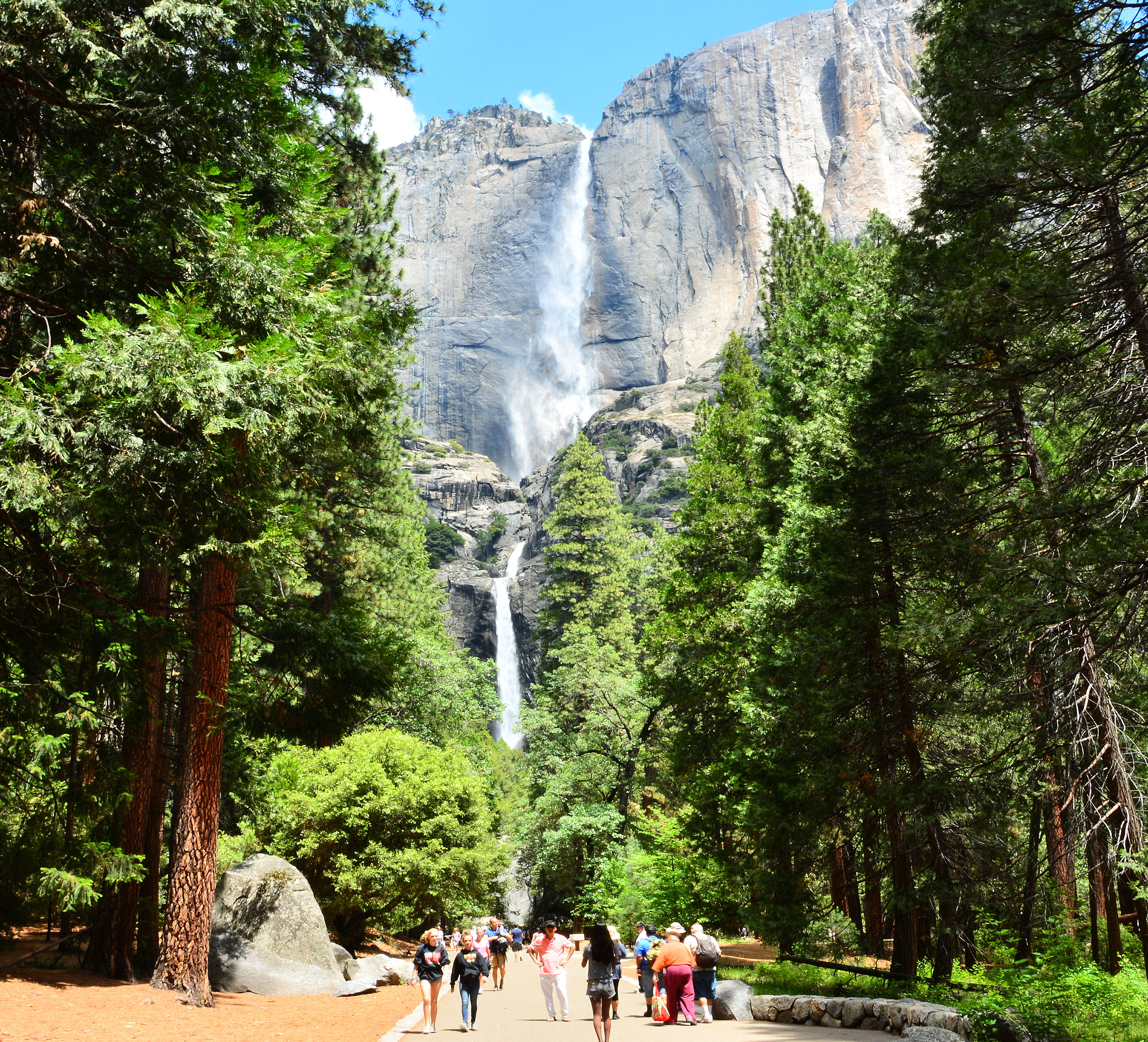
All three falls

The falls consist of three sections comprising six total drops:

=== Upper Yosemite Fall ===
Yosemite Upper Falls

The 1,430-foot (440 m) plunge comprises over half the total drop. Trails from the valley floor and down from other park areas outside the valley lead to both the top and base of Upper Yosemite Fall.

The upper fall is formed by the swift waters of Yosemite Creek, which, after meandering through Eagle Creek Meadow, drop over the edge of a hanging valley in a spectacular and deafening show of force.

=== Middle Cascades ===
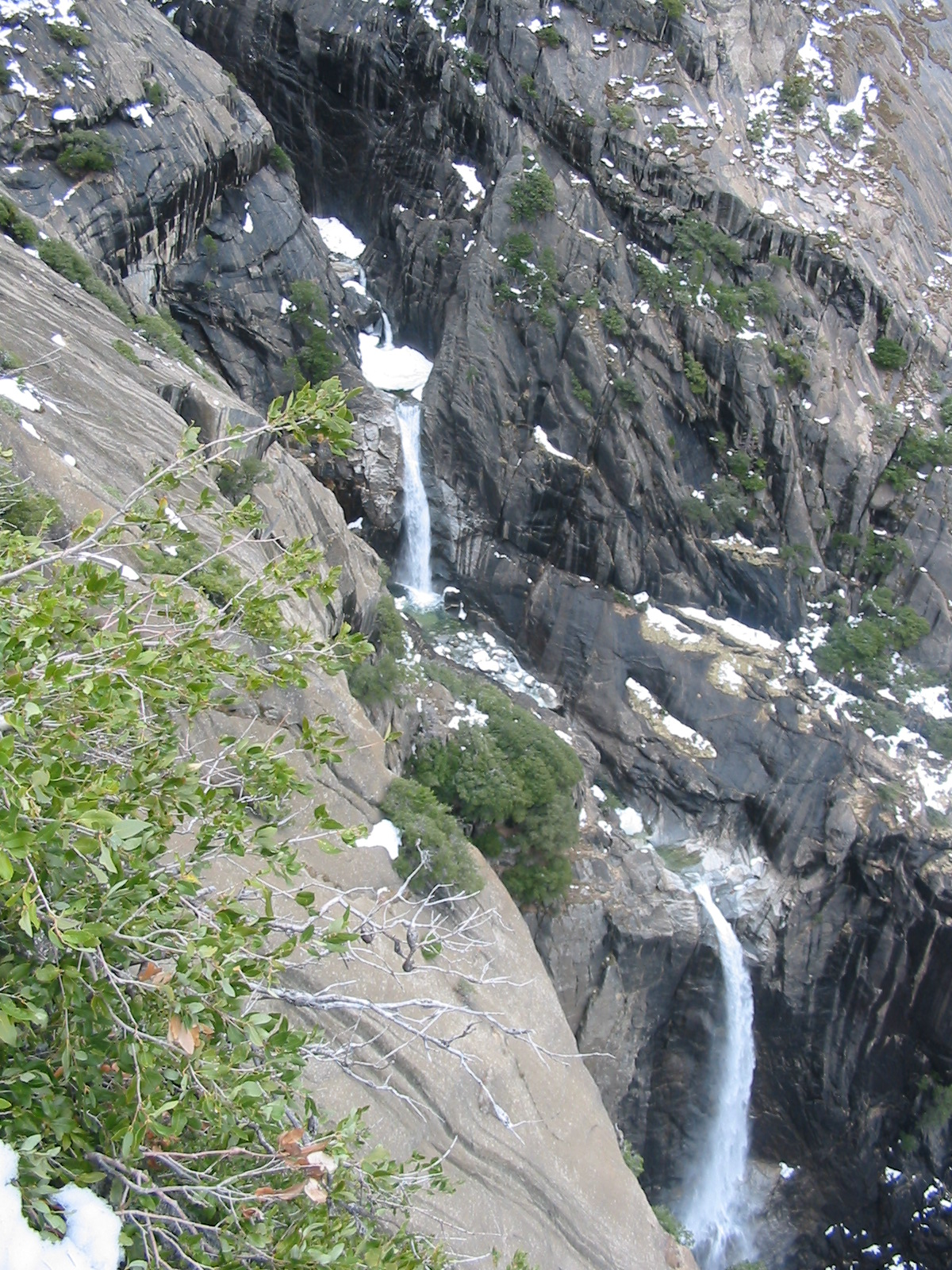
The Middle Cascades, other than the last drop, are not visible from the valley floor

Between the two obvious main plunges there are a series of four smaller plunges collectively referred to as the Middle Cascades. Taken together these account for a total drop of 675 feet (206 m), more than twice the height of the Lower Fall.

Because of the narrow, constricted shape of the gorge in which these drops occur and the lack of public access, they are rarely noted. Most viewpoints in the valley miss them entirely. Several vantage points for the cascades are found along the Yosemite Falls trail. Several hikers climbing down from the trail towards the cascades have required an expensive helicopter rescue due to steep and slippery terrain and features.

=== Lower Yosemite Fall ===
The final 320-foot (98 m) drop adjacent to an accessible viewing area, provides the most-used viewing point for the waterfalls. Yosemite Creek emerges from the base of the Lower Fall and flows into the Merced River nearby. Like many areas of Yosemite the plunge pool at the base of the Lower Fall is surrounded by dangerous jumbles of talus made even more treacherous by the high humidity and resulting slippery surfaces.

== Flow ==
In all but the wettest years, the falls cease flowing altogether in late summer or fall. A very small number of rock climbers have taken the opportunity to climb the normally inaccessible rock face beneath the falls, although this is an extraordinarily dangerous undertaking; a single afternoon thunderstorm could restart the falls, sweeping the climbers off the face.

Lower Yosemite Fall is easily accessible near the Yosemite Lodge in Yosemite Valley. The top of Upper Yosemite Fall may be reached via a steep, strenuous, and usually crowded 3.5 miles (5.6 km) hike beginning near Camp 4 in Yosemite valley. Upper Yosemite Fall may also be reached via the Yosemite Creek Trail from the Tioga Road to the north.

== The Ahwahneechee Legend ==
The main village of the native people of Yosemite Valley, the Ahwahneechee, was located at the base of the falls.

The Ahwahneechee people called the waterfall "Cholock" ("the fall") and believed that the plunge pool at its base was inhabited by the spirits of several witches, called the Poloti. An Ahwaneechee folktale describes a woman going to fetch a pail of water from the pool, and drawing it out full of snakes. Later that night, after the woman had trespassed into their territory, the spirits caused the woman's house to be sucked into the pool by a powerful wind, taking the woman and her newborn baby with it.

== Hiking ==
Several trails are available to hikers. The most challenging hiking trail leading to the top is about 3.6 miles long and takes about two to four hours to climb, depending on a person's experience and preparedness. The most popular and easily accessible trail begins at the bridge near the bottom of the lower fall.

Park naturalists treat visitors to complementary lectures about the Yosemite Valley and Yosemite falls including descriptions of various hiking trails. Park naturalists also provide assistance to visitors and give explanations about safety measures and regulations.

== See also ==
- List of waterfalls
- List of waterfalls in California
- List of waterfalls by height
