= Hiking, rock climbing, and mountain climbing around Tuolumne Meadows =

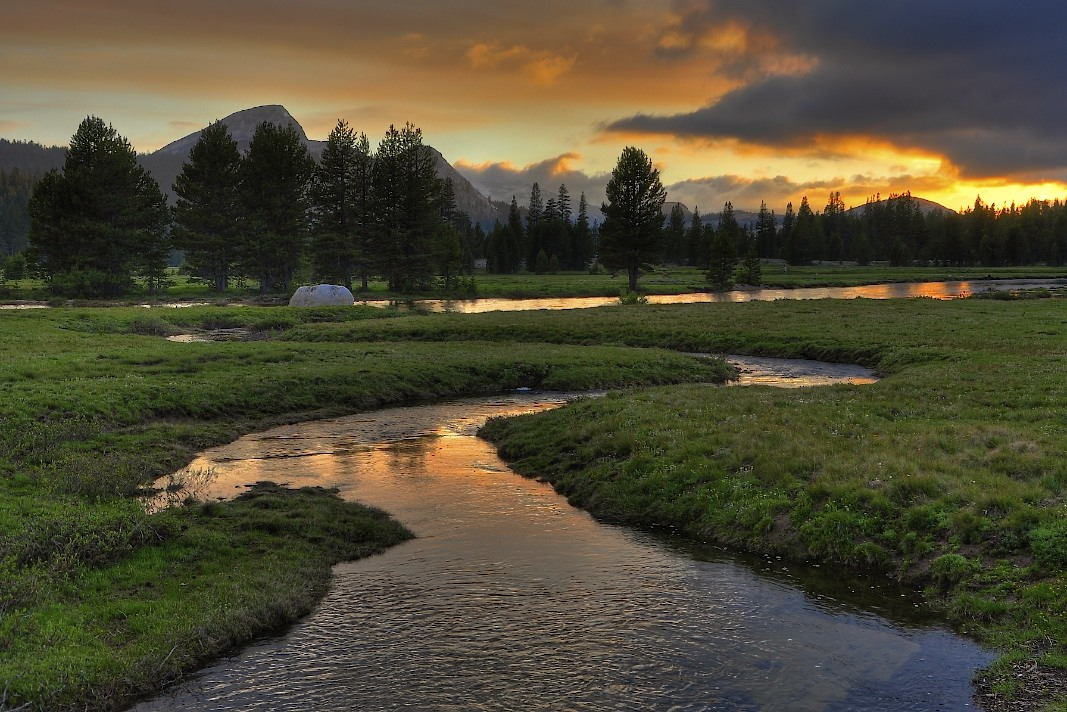
Sunset over Tuolumne River by Tuolumne Meadows

Hiking, rock climbing, and mountain climbing around Tuolumne Meadows in Yosemite National Park has many options.

== Hiking and rock climbing, a note on granite domes ==
Granite domes are common in Tuolumne, and, throughout Yosemite National Park. There is a separate page, all about granite domes of Yosemite. At present, its references focus on rock climbing, but others are free, to add references about hiking. It is available under Granite Domes of Yosemite National Park, as the page is not specific to Tuolumne Meadows; the table of domes may be sorted, so you may look at a chosen area.

== Hiking ==
Many backcountry hiking and backpacking trails start in or near Tuolumne Meadows. The John Muir Trail and the Pacific Crest Trails are long-distance backpacking trails that go through Lyell Canyon into Tuolumne Meadows. Tuolumne Meadows also feature a wide range of day trails. Day hike trails are popular, and get busy in the summer high season. These trails are serviced by the Tuolumne Meadows shuttle bus, typically from June to September, though dates vary due to weather.

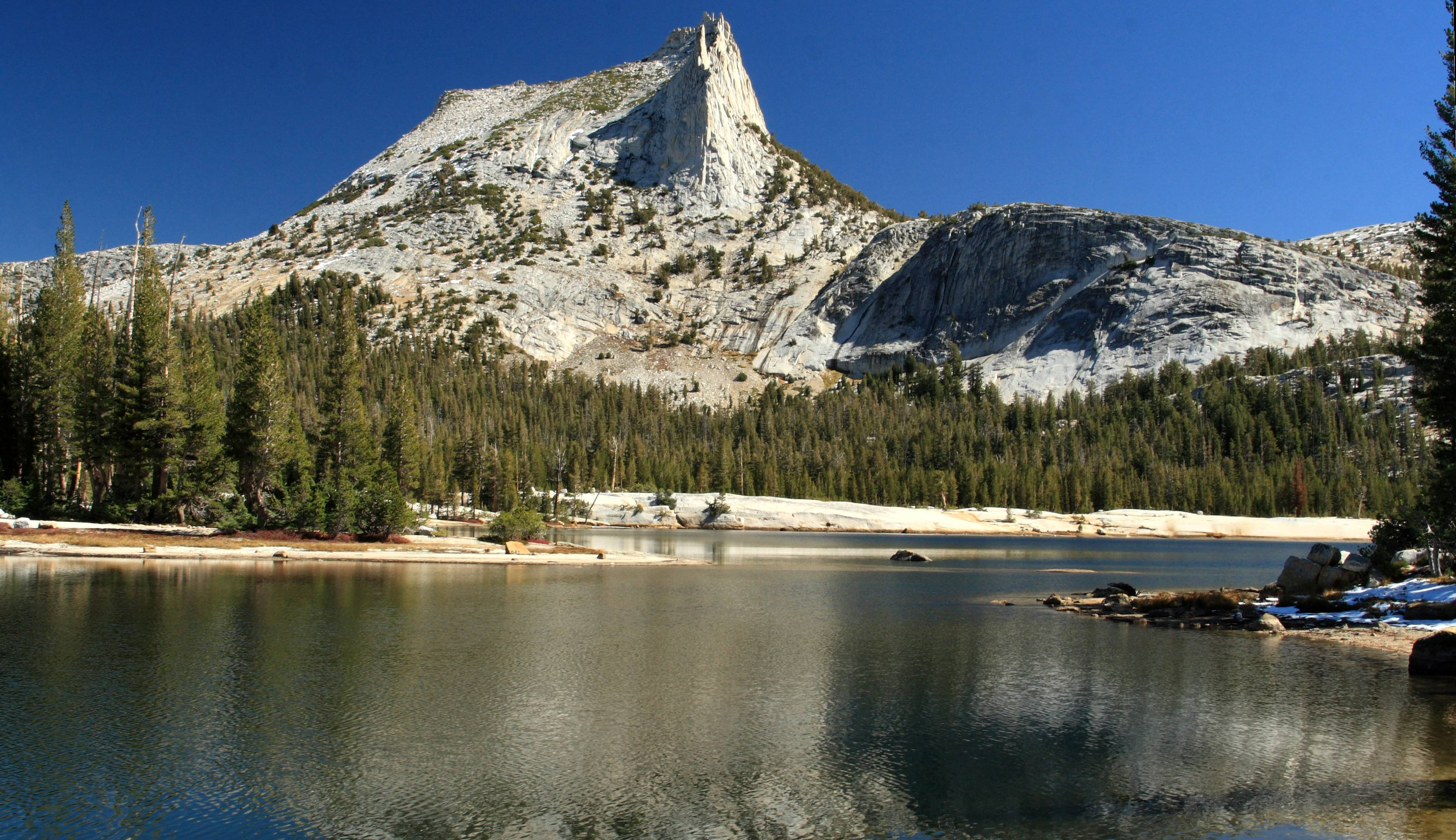
Lower Cathedral Lake, in the foreground, occupies a basin excavated in the granite by the ancient glaciers. Cathedral Peak is behind, Eichorn Pinnacle visible, just left of the summit. Both are nunataks.

Hiking destinations:

- Bennettville, a ghost town
- Budd Lake (California)
- Cathedral Lakes,
- Conness Glacier,
- Dana Meadows,
- Dog Lake,
- Donohue Pass
- Elizabeth Lake,
- Gaylor Lakes
- Glen Aulin,
- Hall Natural Area,
- John Muir Trail,
- Lyell Canyon, via the John Muir Trail,
- Lyell Meadow,
- Mono Pass,
- Parsons Lodge,
- Soda Springs,
- Soda Springs Cabin,
- Tioga Pass,
- Vogelsang High Sierra Camp, one of many High Sierra Camps in the Sierra Nevada,
- Waterwheel Falls,
- Young Lakes

== Rock climbing ==
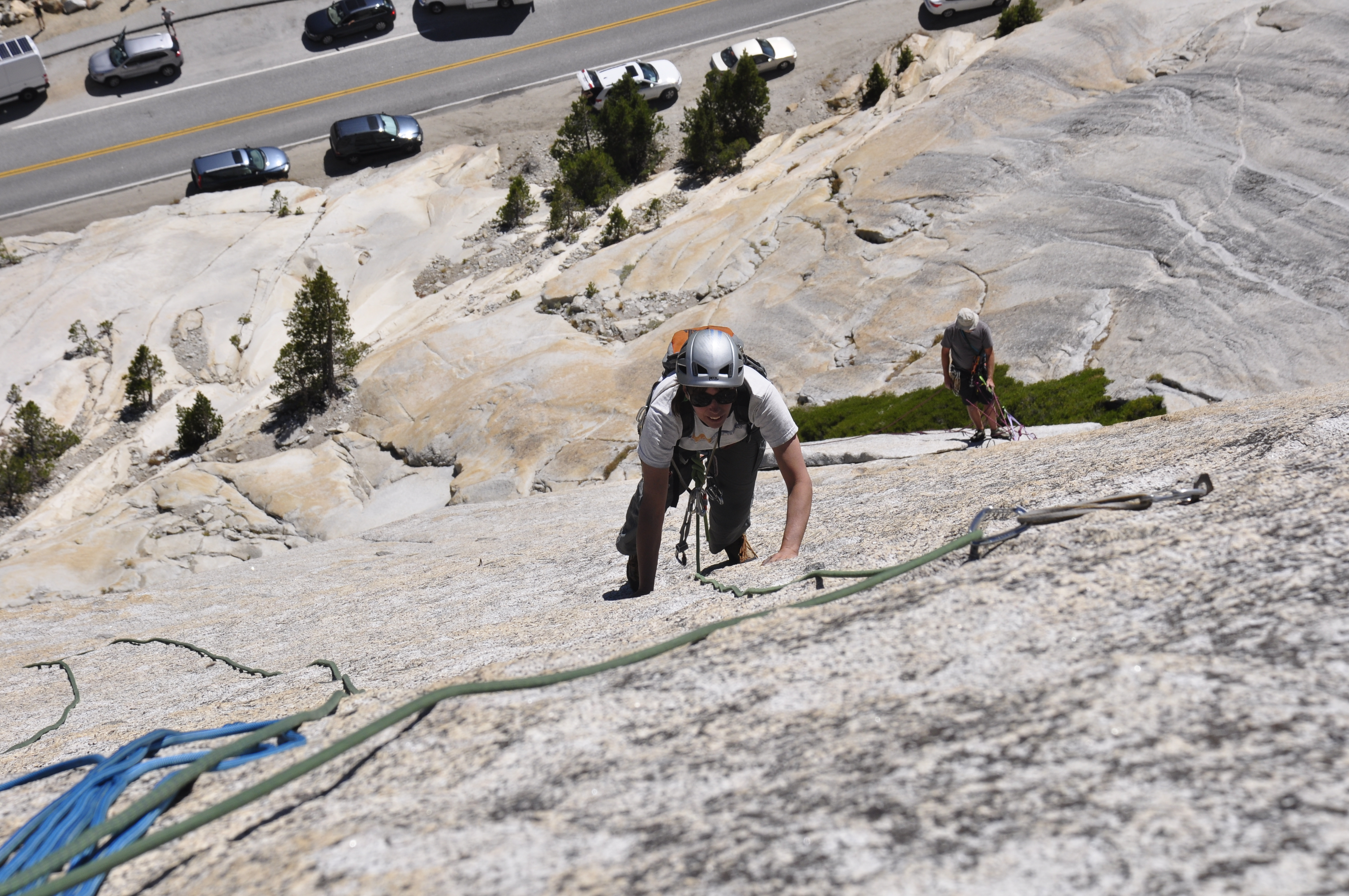
Stately Pleasure Dome - Hermaphrodite Flake

In Tuolumne, rock climbing is popular, and there are many granite domes, there and elsewhere in Yosemite.

In contrast to the big walls of Yosemite Valley, climbing at Tuolumne generally consists of short- to medium-length routes on eleven major domes and several minor ones; see Granite Domes of Yosemite National Park. As the area is all at a high elevation, climbing season is mainly limited to June through September.

In Tuolumne, granite tends to be knobby, moreso than Yosemite Valley.

The rock is porphyritic granite, a very strong form of granite, plus granodiorite; see Cathedral Peak Granodiorite and Kuna Crest Granodiorite. It has a tendency to exfoliation, which produces and preserves distinctive "onion dome" shapes. Resulting climbing includes both face and crack routes, face routes often runout due to limited numbers of bolts, and crack routes frequently following very thin cracks. Local ethic is to limit the placement of bolts on new routes and to forbid the addition of bolts to existing routes, resulting in distances of 40 feet (12 m) or more between bolts.

Many domes are in Tuolumne area. Major (and minor) domes include:

- Daff Dome,
- Dog Dome
- Dozier Dome,
- Fairview Dome,
- Harlequin Dome,
- Lembert Dome,
- Mariolumne Dome,
- Marmot Dome,
- Medlicott Dome,
- Polly Dome,
- Pothole Dome,
- Puppy Dome,
- Stately Pleasure Dome

Echo Peaks have been hiked, but are usually rock-climbed, as Ragged Peak may be scrambled, but is also rock climbed. Mountain that are not usually walk-ups, but typically rock-climbs:

- Cockscomb,
- Echo Peaks,
- Ragged Peak
- Unicorn Peak,

== Mountain climbing ==
Around Tuolumne Meadows, mountain climbing is quite popular; for the highest mountains in the entire park, see the highest mountains of Yosemite National Park.

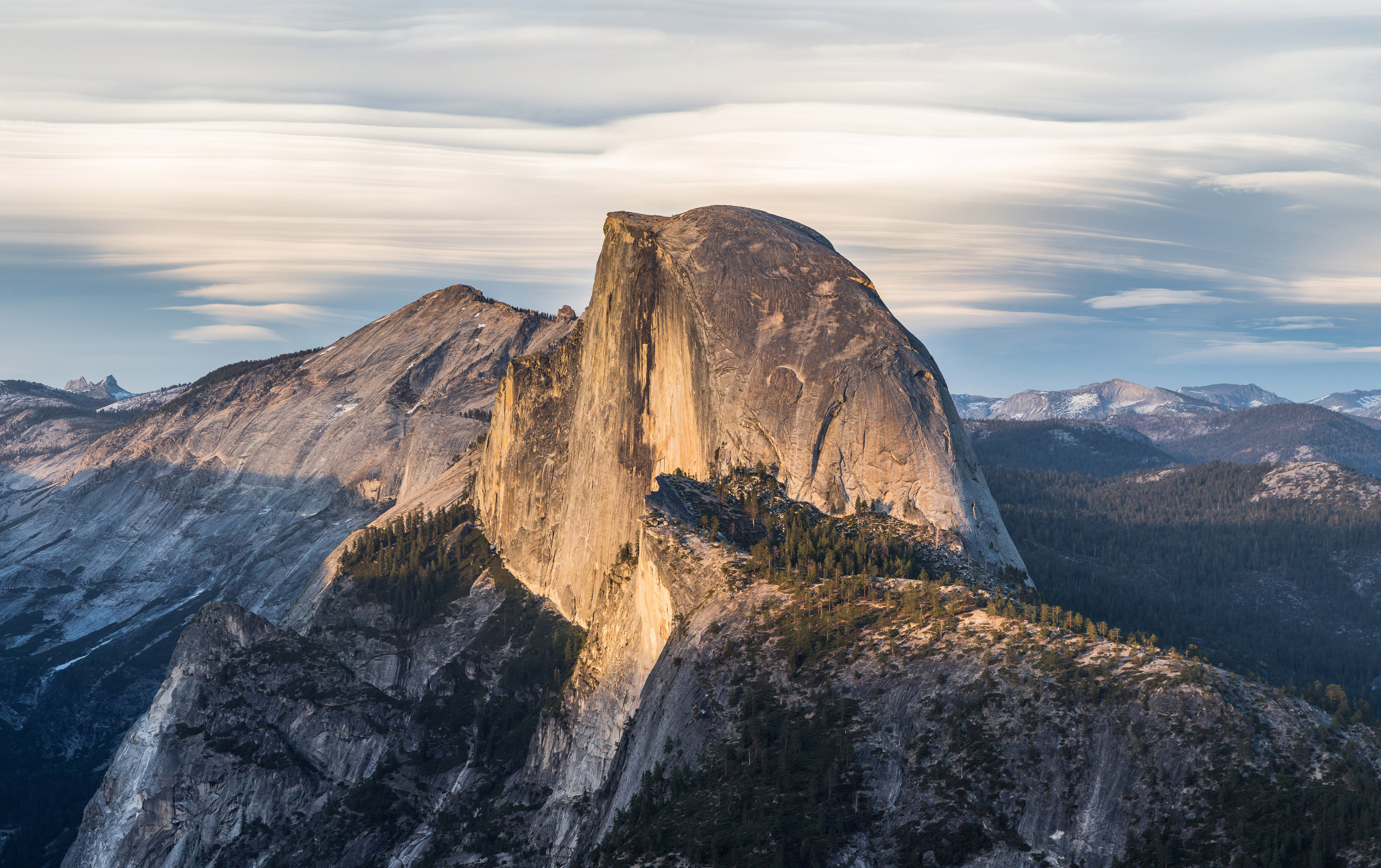
The symbol of Yosemite: Half Dome, which may be hiked, via the Cable Route. Behind Half Dome is Clouds Rest, the highest point visible from Yosemite Valley. Taken from Glacier Point, to which from Yosemite Valley may be hiked, via the Four Mile Trail.

A few mountains that can be climbed, out of Tuolumne Meadows:

- Amelia Earhart Peak
- Banner Peak
- Blacktop Peak
- Cathedral Peak, and Eichorn Pinnacle,
- Donohue Peak
- Echo Ridge,
- Electra Peak
- Excelsior Mountain
- False White Mountain,
- Johnson Peak, the highest mountain in Tuolumne area,
- Kuna Crest
- Kuna Peak,
- Mammoth Peak,
- Matthes Crest,
- Matterhorn Peak,
- Mount Conness,
- Mount Dana,
- Mount Davis
- Mount Florence,
- Mount Gibbs,
- Mount Hoffmann,
- Mount Lyell, the highest peak in Yosemite National Park,
- Mount Maclure,
- North Peak,
- Parsons Peak,
- Rodgers Peak,
- Shepherd Crest
- Simmons Peak
- Tioga Peak,
- Tresidder Peak,
- Tuolumne Peak,
- Virginia Peak
- Vogelsang Peak,
- White Mountain

== See also ==
- List of Yosemite destinations
- Tuolumne Meadows
- Yosemite National Park
- Yosemite Valley
