= Rafferty Peak =

Mountain in Yosemite National Park

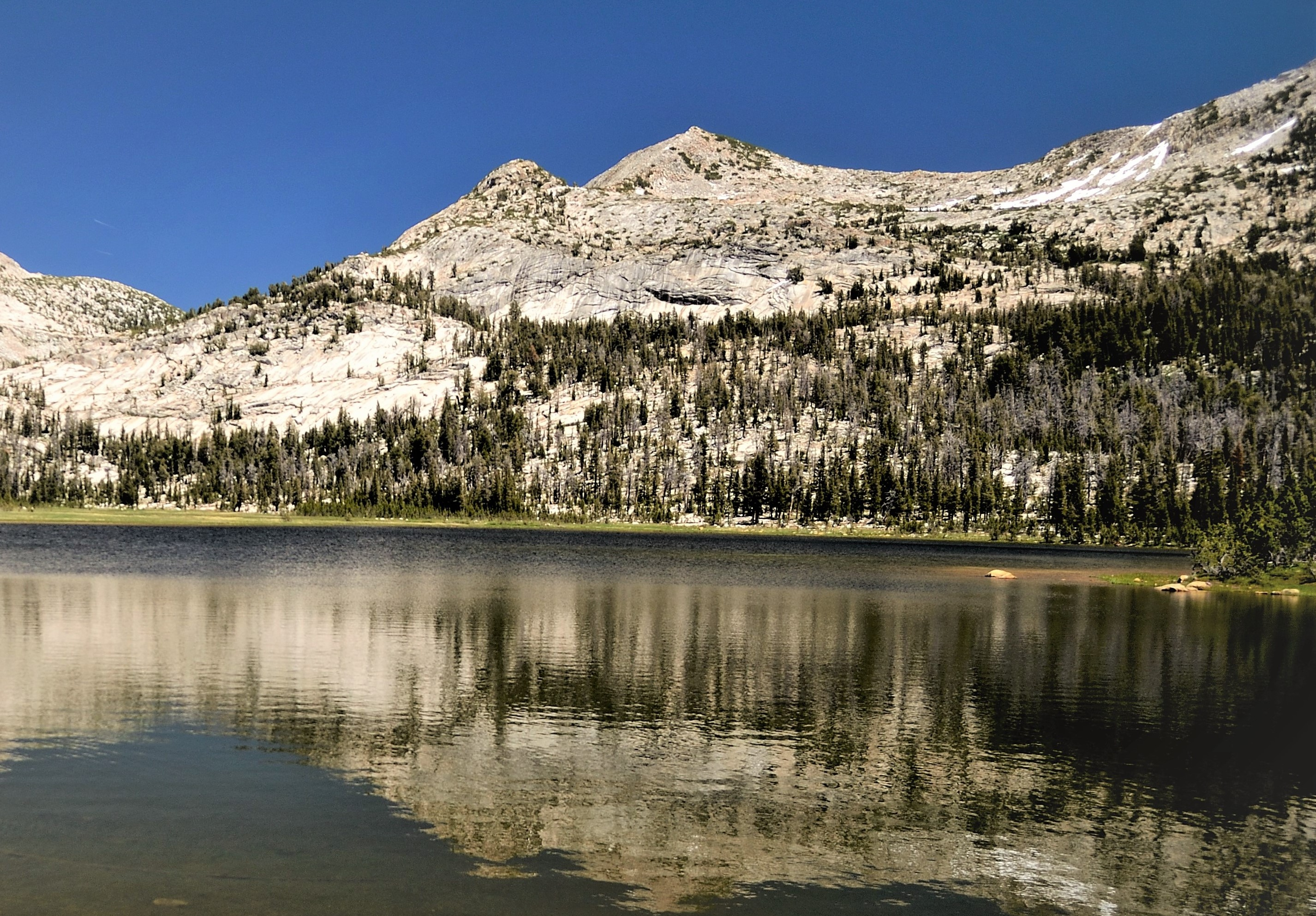
- Southwest aspect, reflected in Nelson Lake

Highest point
- Elevation: 11,110 ft (3,386 m)
- Prominence: 190 ft (58 m)
- Isolation: 1.0 mi (1.6 km)
- Coordinates: 37°48′55″N 119°21′20″W

Naming
- Etymology: Ogden Rafferty

Geography
- Location within California Location within the United States
- Location: Yosemite National Park; Mariposa / Tuolumne counties California, U.S.
- Parent range: Cathedral Range, Sierra Nevada
- Topo map: USGS Vogelsang Peak

Geology
- Rock age: Cretaceous
- Mountain type: Fault block
- Rock type: Granodiorite

Climbing
- First ascent: Edward W. Hernden
- Easiest route: class 2

Rafferty Peak is an 11,110-foot-elevation (3,390-meter) mountain summit located in Yosemite National Park, in California, United States. It is situated on the common border shared by Mariposa and Tuolumne Counties. It is set south of Tuolumne Meadows in the Cathedral Range which is a sub-range of the Sierra Nevada mountain range. The mountain rises one mile (1.6 km) northwest of Tuolumne Pass, 1.4 mile south of Johnson Peak, and 2.5 miles east of Matthes Crest. Tuolumne Pass is the low point of the saddle between Rafferty Peak and Fletcher Peak. Topographic relief is significant as the summit rises 1,500 feet (460 meters) above Nelson Lake in one mile.

== History ==
This geographical feature was named in 1895 by Lieutenant Nathaniel Fish McClure who prepared a map of Yosemite National Park for use by troops. The name honors Captain Ogden Rafferty (1860–1922), Medical Corps, United States Army, who accompanied McClure on a patrol of Yosemite Valley. This geographical feature's toponym was submitted by the National Park Service and officially adopted in 1932 by the U.S. Board on Geographic Names. The first ascent of the summit was made by Edward W. Hernden, date unknown.

== Climate ==
According to the Köppen climate classification system, Rafferty Peak is located in an alpine climate zone. Most weather fronts originate in the Pacific Ocean, and travel east toward the Sierra Nevada mountains. As fronts approach, they are forced upward by the peaks (orographic lift), causing them to drop their moisture in the form of rain or snowfall onto the range. Precipitation runoff from this landform drains north to the Tuolumne River via Rafferty Creek, and south to the Merced River.

== See also ==
- Geology of the Yosemite area
