= Echo Peaks =

Nine mountains near Tuolumne Meadows, in Yosemite National Park, California

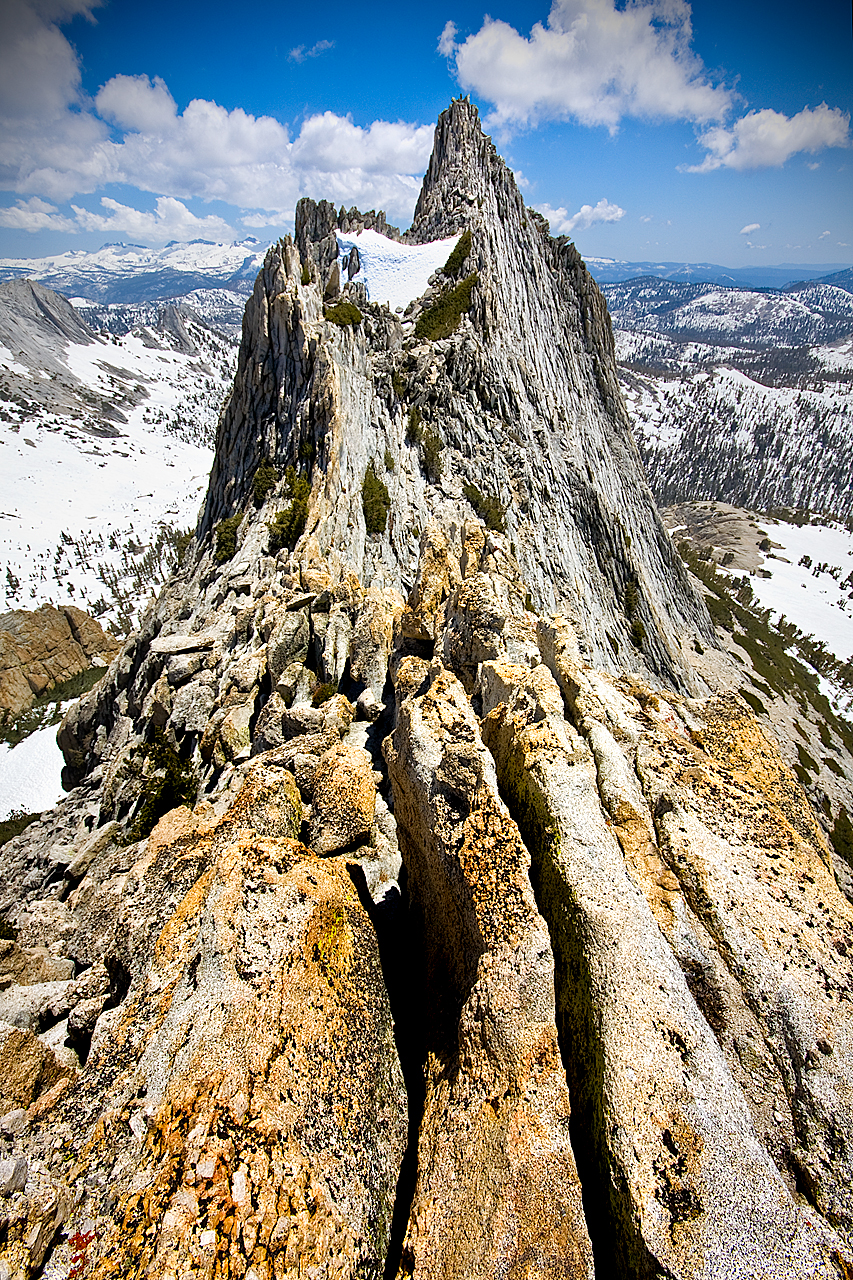
- The ridge connecting Echo Peaks 2 & 3 from Echo Peak 1

Highest point
- Elevation: 11,160 ft (3,400 m) NAVD 88
- Coordinates: 37.83250°N 119.4019°W

Geography
- Location: Yosemite National Park, Tuolumne Meadows, Mariposa County, California, U.S.
- Parent range: Sierra Nevada

Echo Peaks consists of nine peaks, in the Tuolumne Meadows region of Yosemite National Park, California. They are near Echo Ridge.

== John Muir and Echo Peaks ==
John Muir passed by Echo Peaks, writing about it in The Yosemite, sometime during or before 1912.

== The area ==
Echo Peaks are near all of Budd Lake, Cathedral Lakes, Cathedral Peak, Cockscomb, Elizabeth Lake, Matthes Crest, Tresidder Peak and Unicorn Peak.

== Rock climbing ==
Echos Peaks have rock climbing. Among rock climbers, Echo Peaks are popular, offering class 2-5 climbs on the nine peaklets.
