= Unicorn Peak (California) =

Unicorn Peak is mountain peak, in Yosemite National Park, in the Tuolumne Meadows area

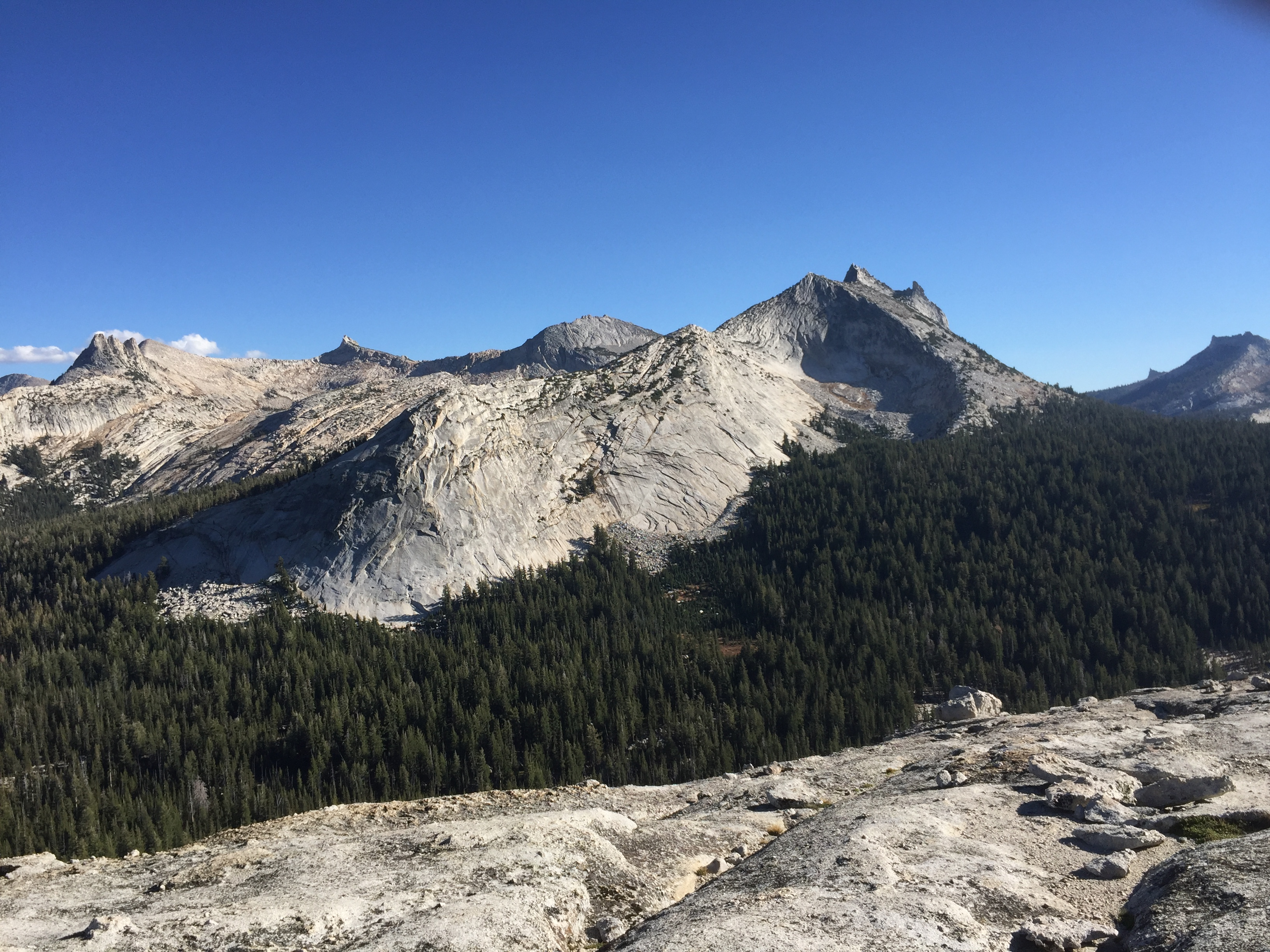
- Unicorn Peak, Cockscomb, Echo Ridge and Cathedral Peak

Highest point
- Elevation: 10,823 ft (3,299 m) NAVD 88
- Prominence: 103 ft (31 m)
- Coordinates: 37°50′45″N 119°22′55″W

Geography
- Location: Yosemite National Park, California, United States
- Parent range: Cathedral Range, Sierra Nevada

Geology
- Rock age: Cretaceous
- Mountain type: Granite

Climbing
- First ascent: Francis P. Farquhar and James Rennie in 1911
- Easiest route: Rock climb class 4

Unicorn Peak is a peak, in Tuolumne Meadows, Yosemite National Park. Unicorn Peak is due east of Cathedral Peak, and the north summit is highest.

Unicorn Peak is part of the Cathedral Range.

All three of Unicorn Peak, Cockscomb Peak, and Cathedral Peak qualify as nunataks, islands that stood above the ice, when the last ice age created glaciers in the area. During the Tioga glaciation the peak projected above the glaciers, which carved and sharpened the peak's bases while plucking away at its sides.

== On the area of Unicorn Peak ==
All of the following are at least close to Unicorn Peak:

- Budd Lake
- Cathedral Peak
- Cockscomb
- Echo Peaks
- Elizabeth Lake
- Johnson Peak

== Hiking and rock climbing ==
Many hike, at least the base of Unicorn Peak, and to nearby sites.

To the summit, the easiest route is to rock climb a class 4, though other routes are available.

== External links and references ==
- One link on rock climbing Unicorn Peak, normal route
- Unicorn Peak, rock climbing
- Trails, Tuolumne: Elizabeth Lake & Unicorn Peak
- A YouTube, on Unicorn Peak
- A YouTube, 2 Days in Yosemite High Country: Unicorn Peak, Fly Fishing & North Dome
- A YouTube, Climbing the Unicorn Peak
- On the first ascent of Unicorn Peak
- An Ansel Adams photo of Unicorn Peak
- A topographic map of the region
