= Cathedral Range =

Mountain range in Yosemite National Park, California

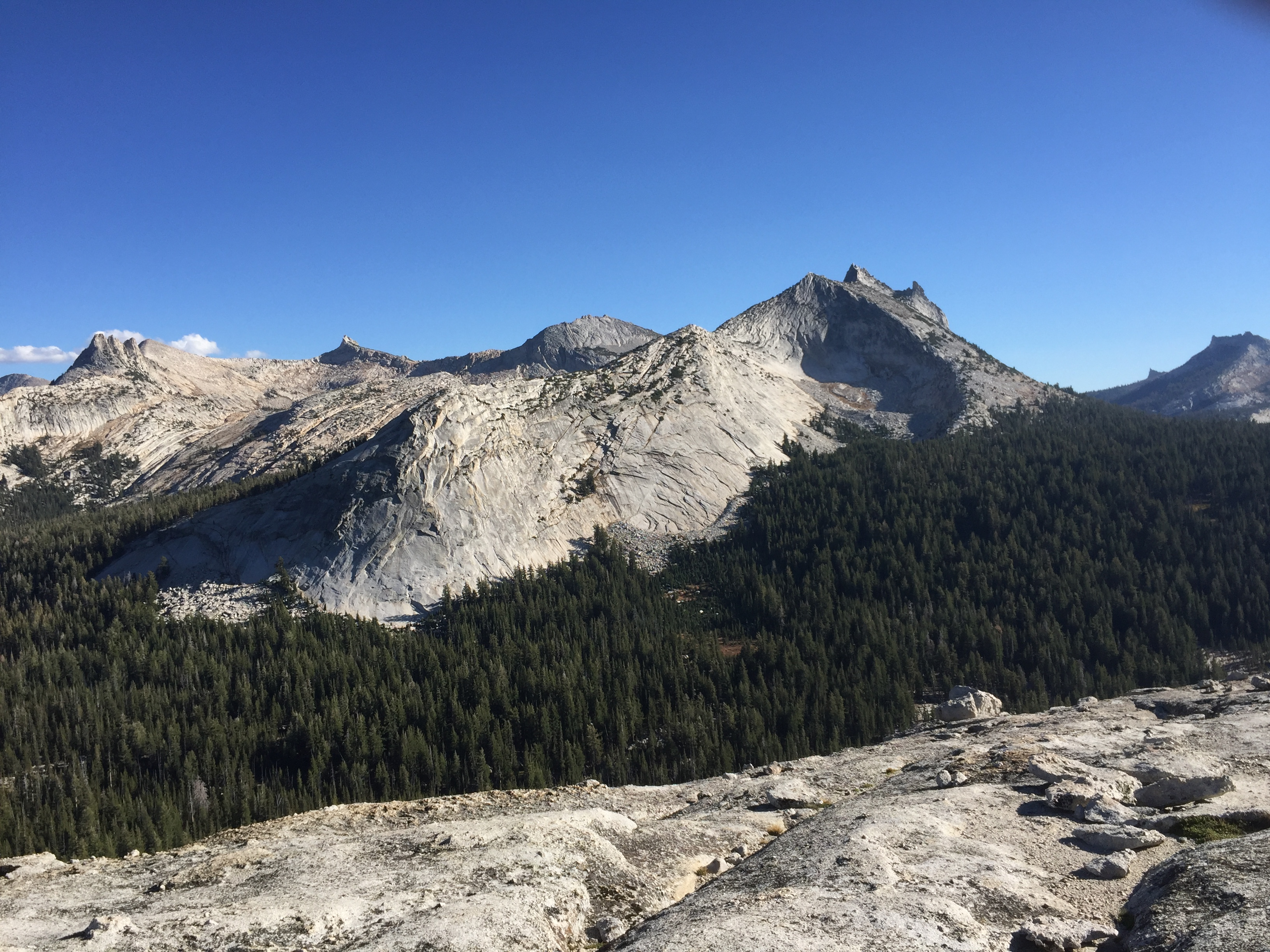
- Cathedral Range from the summit of Fairview Dome. From L-R: Unicorn Peak, Cockscomb, Echo Ridge and Cathedral Peak.

Highest point
- Peak: Mount Florence
- Elevation: 12,561 ft (3,829 m)

Dimensions
- Length: 10 mi (16 km)

Geography
- Location within California Location within the United States
- Country: United States
- State: California
- Counties: Madera, Tuolumne, and Mariposa
- Range coordinates: 37°44′22″N 119°16′19″W
- Parent range: Sierra Nevada (U.S.)
- Topo map: USGS Mount Lyell

The Cathedral Range is a mountain range immediately to the south of Tuolumne Meadows in Yosemite National Park. The range is an offshoot of the Sierra Nevada. The range is named after Cathedral Peak, which resembles a cathedral spire.

== Geography ==
The range includes Cathedral Peak, Unicorn Peak, Eichorn Pinnacle, Echo Peaks, Echo Ridge, Matthes Crest, Rafferty Peak, Vogelsang Peak, Fletcher Peak and Cockscomb. The highest point in the range is Mount Florence, one of the most prominent peaks in the Yosemite high country. The highest peak in Tuolumne Meadows is Johnson Peak.

The range runs beside the two Cathedral Lakes, just one mile southwest of Cathedral Peak. Hikers can access the lakes and Cathedral range by the John Muir trail from the trailhead in Tuolumne Meadows.

== Geology ==
The mountains were formed by glaciers carving out the granite material; also see Cathedral Peak Granodiorite. The tops of the peaks in the range were above the level of the highest glaciation, and are therefore un-eroded and distinctly spire-like; see nunatak.

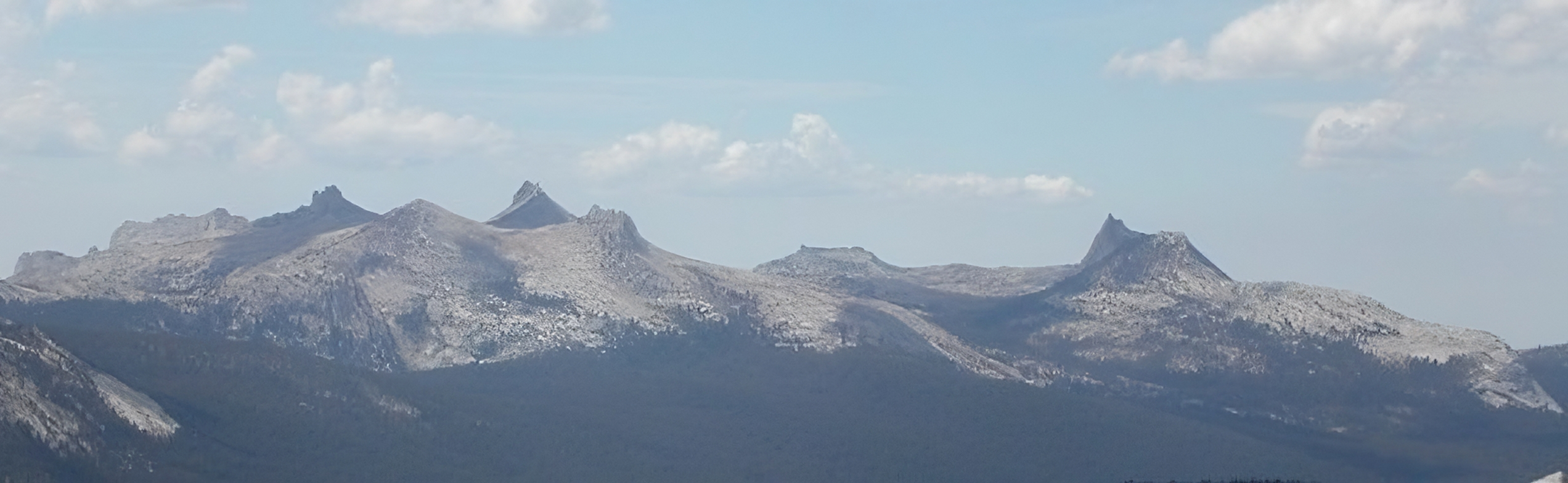
The Cathedral Range from Gaylor Lakes basin
