= Pothole Dome =

Granite dome in Yosemite National Park, USA

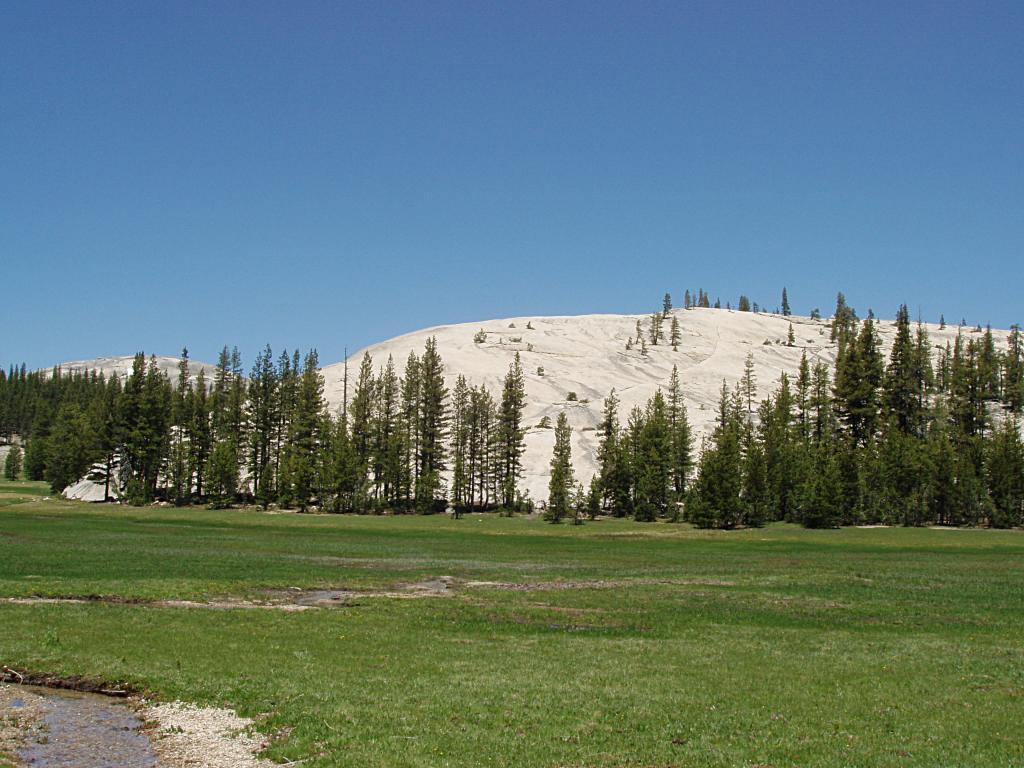

Highest point
- Elevation: 8765+ ft (2671+ m) NAVD 88
- Coordinates: 37°52′48″N 119°23′36″W

Geography
- Location: Tuolumne County, California, U.S.
- Parent range: Sierra Nevada
- Topo map: USGS

Climbing
- Easiest route: Hide, class 1

Pothole Dome is a granite dome on the west side of Tuolumne Meadows, in Yosemite National Park located at Tioga Road mile marker 18. Near Pothole Dome is Marmot Dome. The summit of the dome is easily accessible by foot from a parking area on the Tioga Road at mile marker 18. The view from the summit includes most of Tuolumne Meadows and in the distance, Cathedral Peak. The dome gives evidence of many of the geologic processes at work in Yosemite during and after the last ice age. In particular, the stranded, rounded boulders from a glacier that has long since retreated, and the water-eroded "potholes" provide evidence of two ways that water can interact with granite.

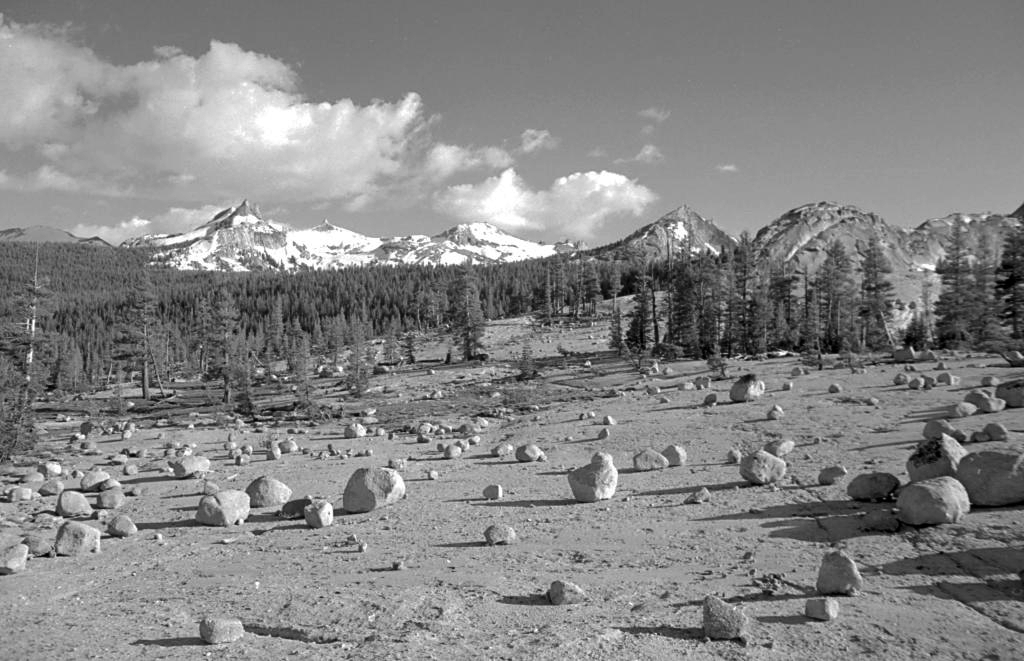
View from top of Pothole Dome

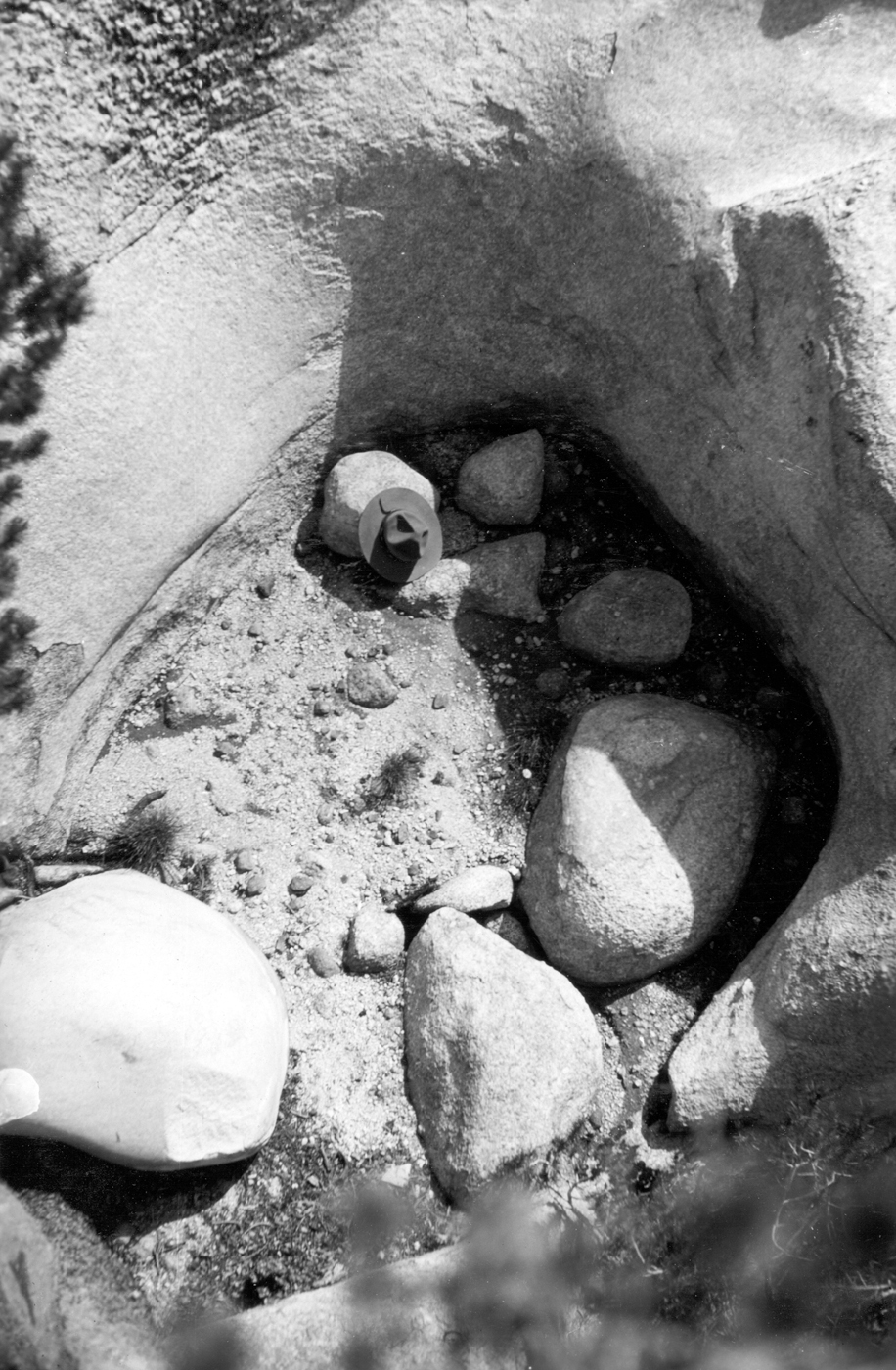
One of the potholes
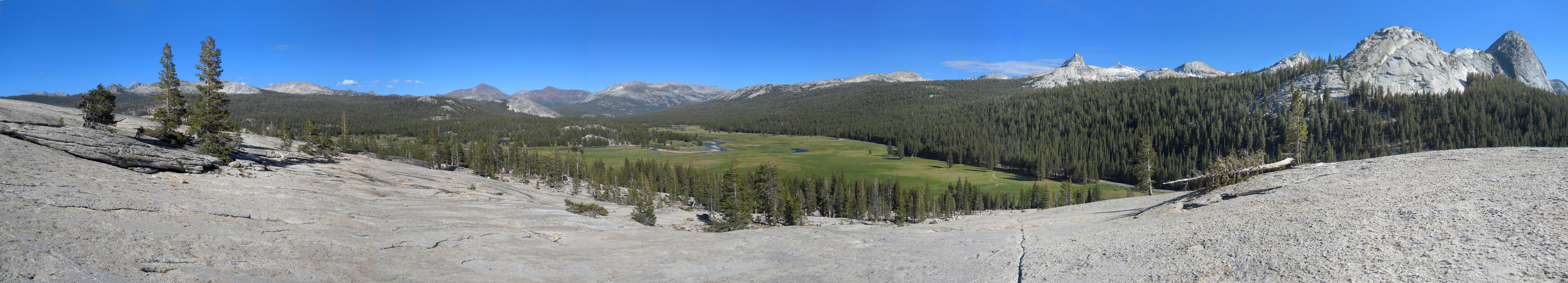
A panorama view from Pothole Dome
