= Budd Lake (California) =

Lake in Yosemite National Park, California, United States

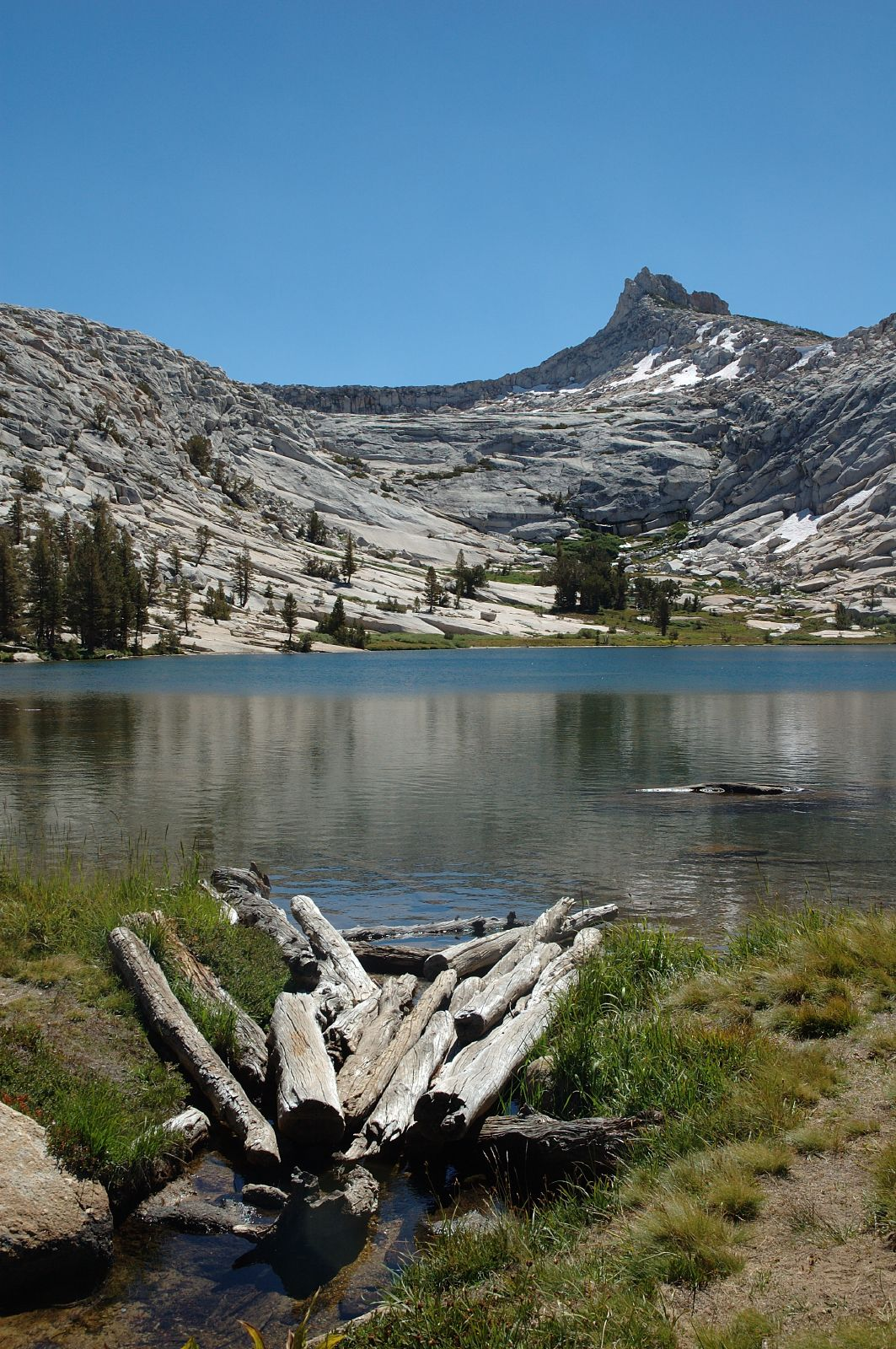
- The start of Budd Creek, Yosemite, on Budd Lake, Cockscomb in the background

- Location within California Location within the United States
- Location: Tuolumne Meadows, in Yosemite National Park
- Coordinates: 37°50′30″N 119°23′44″W
- Basin countries: United States
- Surface elevation: 10,110 feet (3,080 m)

Budd Lake is a lake in the Tuolumne Meadows region of Yosemite National Park, United States. Budd Lake is the source of Budd Creek.

Budd Lake was named for James Budd, 19th Governor of California.

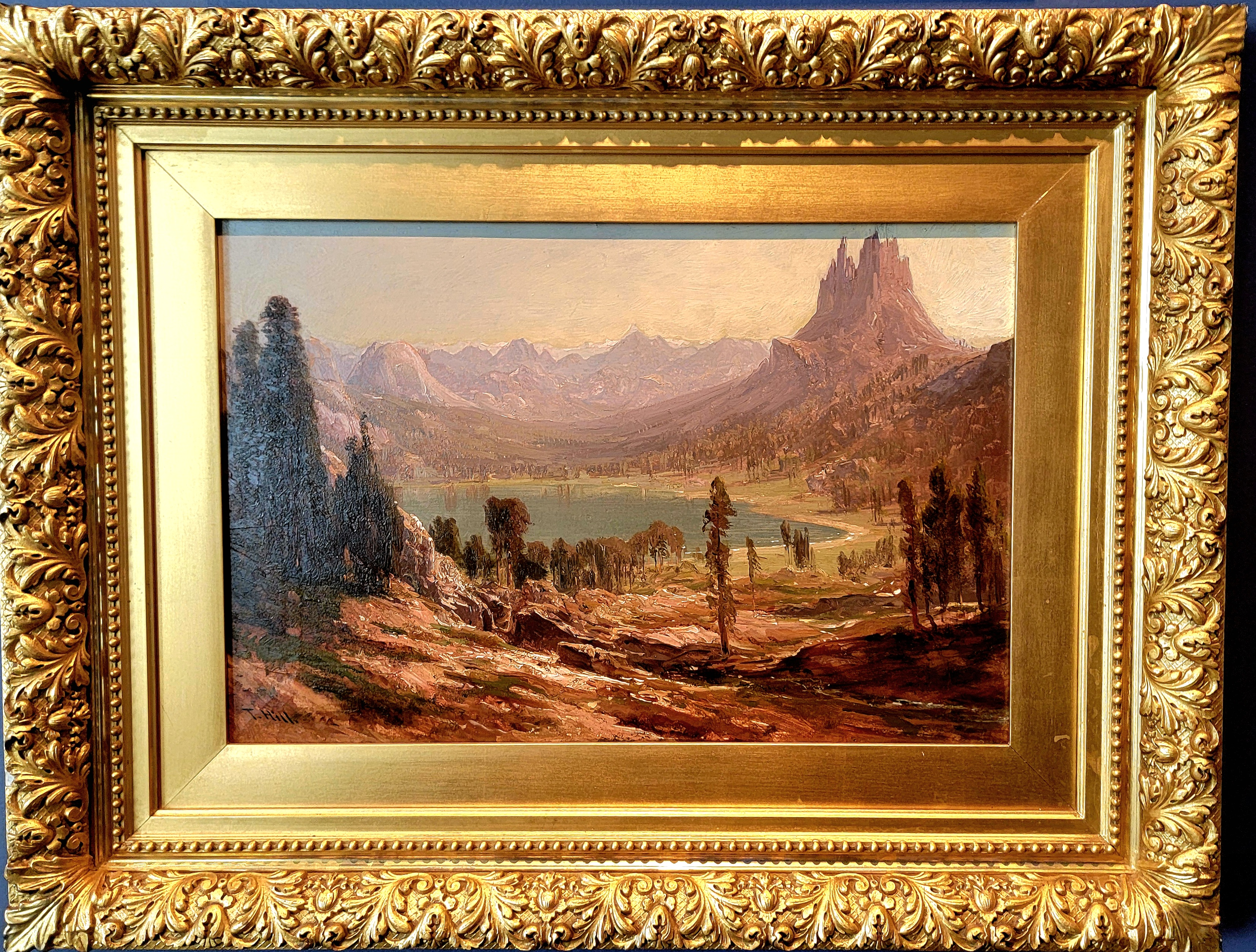
"Budd Lake and Cathedral Peak", ca 1885, by Thomas Hill

== See also ==
- Cathedral Peak, a mountain fairly near Budd Lake
- Cockscomb, another mountain fairly near Budd Lake
- Echo Peaks, mountains near Budd Lake
- Elizabeth Lake, also fairly near Budd Lake
- Matthes Crest, a mountain which is near Budd Lake
- Unicorn Peak, a mountain which is near Budd Lake
- List of lakes in California

== External links and references ==
- A topographic map of the area
- A hiker passes through the area
- More notes on Budd Lake
- Mentions Budd Lake's elevation
