= Johnson Peak =

Mountain in Yosemite National Park, USA

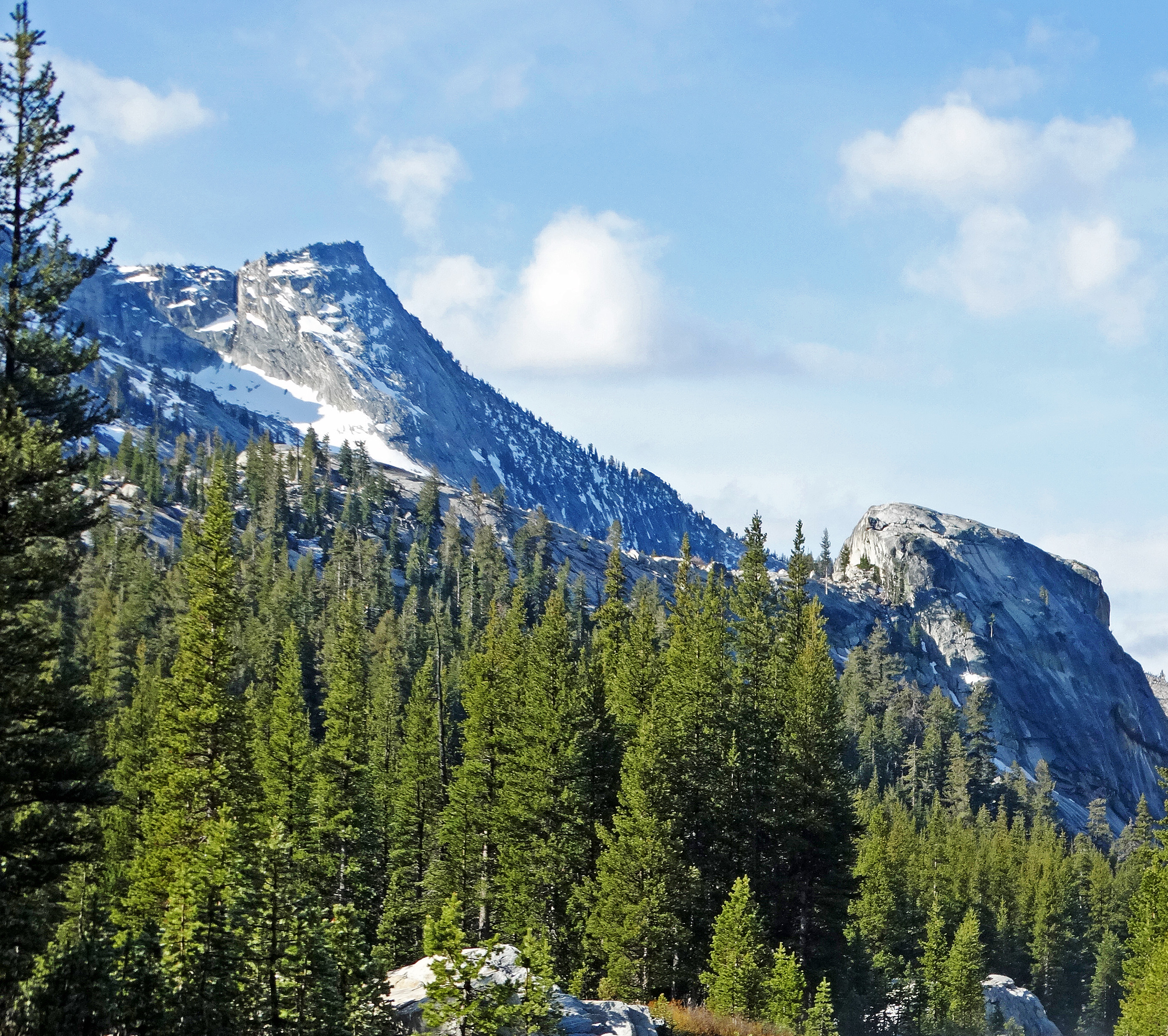
- Johnson Peak

Highest point
- Elevation: 11,040 ft (3,360 m) NAVD 88
- Coordinates: 37°50′6″N 119°20′56″W NAVD 88

Geography
- Location within California
- Location: Yosemite National Park, California, U.S.
- Parent range: Cathedral Range

Geology
- Rock age: Cretaceous
- Mountain type: Granite

Johnson Peak is the highest mountain, in Tuolumne Meadows, Yosemite National Park.

Johnson Peak is made of eroded granite. At 85 Ma, the Johnson Granite Porphyry is the youngest granite rock in the Yosemite National Park, though the entire peak formed beneath the Earth's crust. It broached the surface much later, via subduction.

== The name, and the mountain range ==
R.B. Marshall named Johnson Peak, in the 1890s, to honor a teamster and guide in his survey party, with Professor Davidson. They also climbed Mount Conness.

Johnson Peak is part of the Cathedral Range.

== Geology, and the area ==
Johnson granite porphyry, whose name derives from Johnson Peak, is found there. Far above what is now Johnson Peak, it is possible that a volcanic caldera once may have existed.

Johnson Peak is quite near Elizabeth Lake.

== Climate ==
Climate data for Johnson Peak (CA) 37.8346 N, 119.3500 W, Elevation: 10,679 ft (3,255 m) (1991–2020 normals)
Month	Jan	Feb	Mar	Apr	May	Jun	Jul	Aug	Sep	Oct	Nov	Dec	Year
Mean daily maximum °F (°C)	33.8 (1.0)	33.2 (0.7)	36.3 (2.4)	39.7 (4.3)	46.9 (8.3)	56.5 (13.6)	64.3 (17.9)	63.7 (17.6)	58.1 (14.5)	49.3 (9.6)	39.8 (4.3)	33.2 (0.7)	46.2 (7.9)
Daily mean °F (°C)	23.4 (−4.8)	22.1 (−5.5)	24.6 (−4.1)	27.7 (−2.4)	34.9 (1.6)	43.7 (6.5)	51.2 (10.7)	50.5 (10.3)	45.2 (7.3)	37.4 (3.0)	29.2 (−1.6)	23.2 (−4.9)	34.4 (1.3)
Mean daily minimum °F (°C)	13.0 (−10.6)	11.0 (−11.7)	13.0 (−10.6)	15.6 (−9.1)	22.8 (−5.1)	31.0 (−0.6)	38.2 (3.4)	37.3 (2.9)	32.3 (0.2)	25.5 (−3.6)	18.6 (−7.4)	13.1 (−10.5)	22.6 (−5.2)
Average precipitation inches (mm)	9.36 (238)	8.30 (211)	7.41 (188)	4.13 (105)	2.49 (63)	0.62 (16)	0.58 (15)	0.40 (10)	0.52 (13)	2.68 (68)	4.13 (105)	8.40 (213)	49.02 (1,245)
Source: PRISM Climate Group

== See also ==
- Cathedral Lakes, which are directly below Cathedral Peak
- Cathedral Peak
- Elizabeth Lake
- Mount Dana, the second highest mountain in Yosemite
- Mount Lyell, the highest mountain in Yosemite National Park
