= Budd Creek =

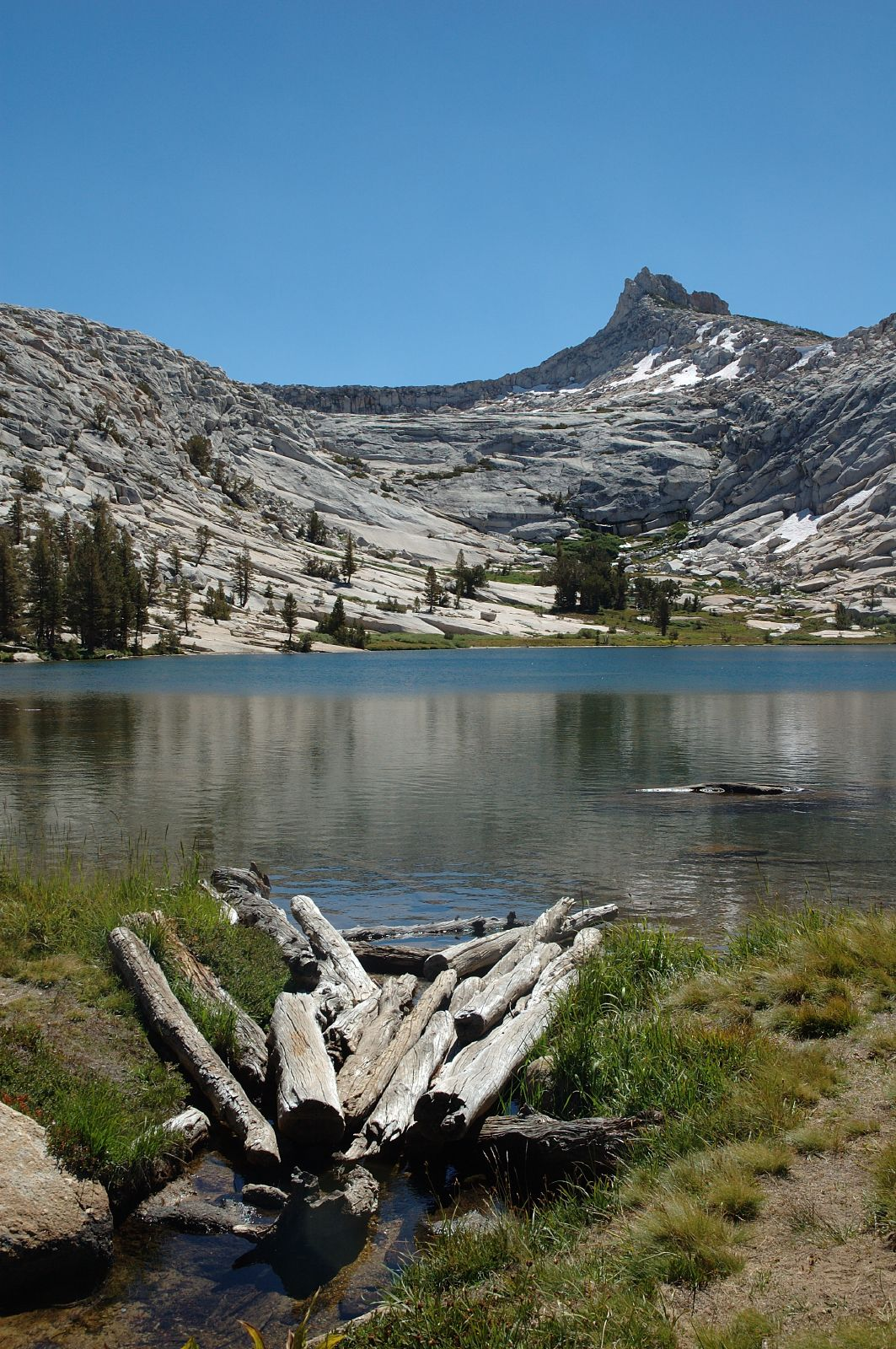
- The start of Budd Creek, Yosemite, on Budd Lake, Cockscomb in the background

Physical characteristics
- Source: Budd Lake
  - coordinates: 37°50′30″N 119°23′44″W

Budd Creek is a stream in Yosemite National Park, United States.

Budd Creek was named for James Budd, 19th Governor of California.

== See also ==
- List of rivers of California
