= Elizabeth Lake (Yosemite National Park) =

Lake within Yosemite National Park, California

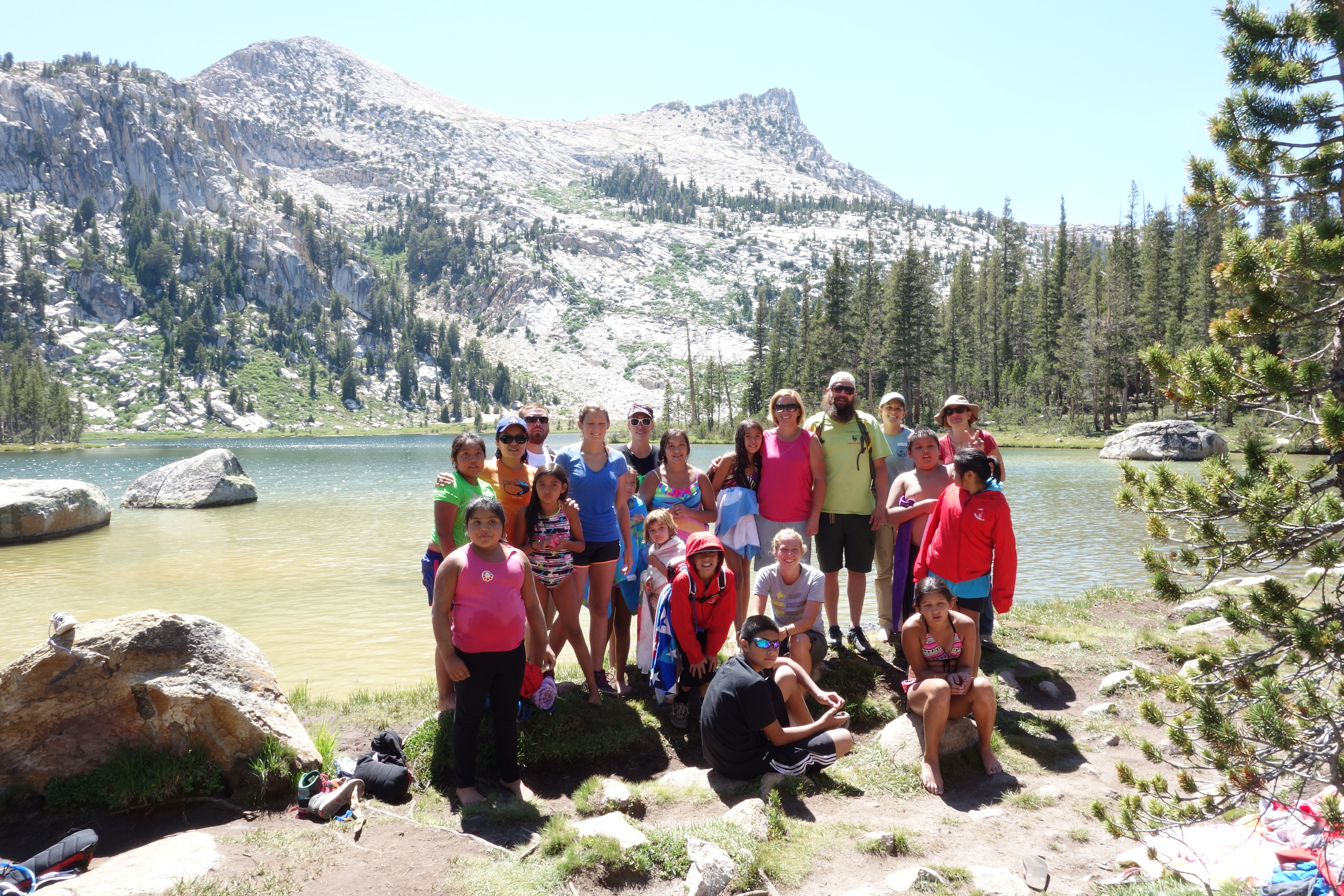
- Elizabeth Lake

- Location within California Location within the United States
- Location: Yosemite National Park, Mariposa County, California
- Coordinates: 37.8453°N 119.3697°W
- Basin countries: United States
- Surface elevation: 2,900 m (9,500 ft)

Elizabeth Lake is a lake, in the area of Tuolumne Meadows, in Yosemite National Park, California. It was named for a geologist's niece, one Elizabeth Crow Simmons. The lake is at the base of Unicorn Peak, and is also near Johnson Peak.

The lake is in Tuolumne County, California.

== The hike ==
To hike to Elizabeth Lake is 4.6 miles (7.4 km), of perhaps two the three hours. One gains perhaps 850 feet (260 m). As with all sights in Tuolumne, hiking the trail depends on season, usually May until October.

For the hike, bug spray and sun tan lotion should be used.

== See also ==
=== General links ===
- List of lakes in California

=== Tuolumne Meadows links ===
- Budd Lake (California), fairly near Budd Lake
- Cathedral Peak, a mountain fairly near Budd Lake
- Cockscomb, another mountain fairly near Budd Lake
- Echo Peaks, mountains near Budd Lake
- Matthes Crest, a mountain which is near Budd Lake
- Unicorn Peak, a peak near Elizabeth Lake
