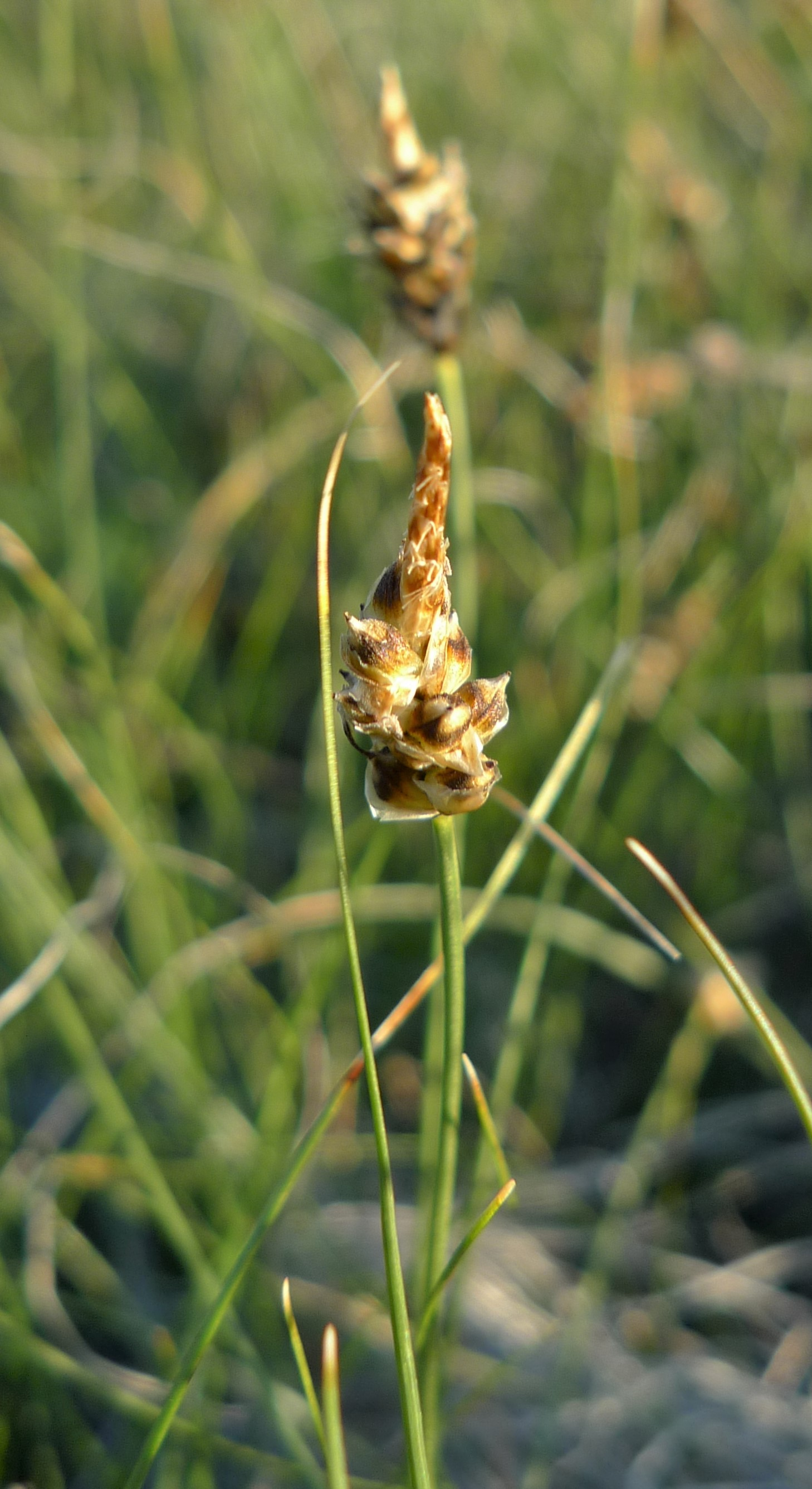
- Carex filifolia on Badger Mountain, Douglas County Washington

Scientific classification
- Kingdom: Plantae
- Clade: Tracheophytes
- Clade: Angiosperms
- Clade: Monocots
- Clade: Commelinids
- Order: Poales
- Family: Cyperaceae
- Genus: Carex
- Species: C. filifolia

Binomial name
- Carex filifolia Nutt.

Synonyms
- Carex elyniformis

= Carex filifolia =

Species of grass-like plant

Carex filifolia is a species of sedge known by the common name threadleaf sedge. It is native to western North America and grows on slopes, eroded areas, gravel, and dry habitats.

== Description ==
Carex filifolia produces clumps of stems which are rounded or triangular, wiry, and angled or curved, reaching up to about 35 centimeters long. The root network is extensive, forming sod. The leaves are narrow and rolled tightly, appearing quill-like.

The inflorescence is up to 3 centimeters long and has flowers coated with reddish scales. The fruit is covered in a sac called a perigynium which is somewhat hairy. The plant produces some seeds, but mainly reproduces vegetatively.

== Distribution and habitat ==
This sedge is native to much of western North America, from Alaska to California and Manitoba to New Mexico, where it grows in moist and dry habitat.
