= Tresidder Peak =

Mountain in Yosemite National Park, California, United States of America

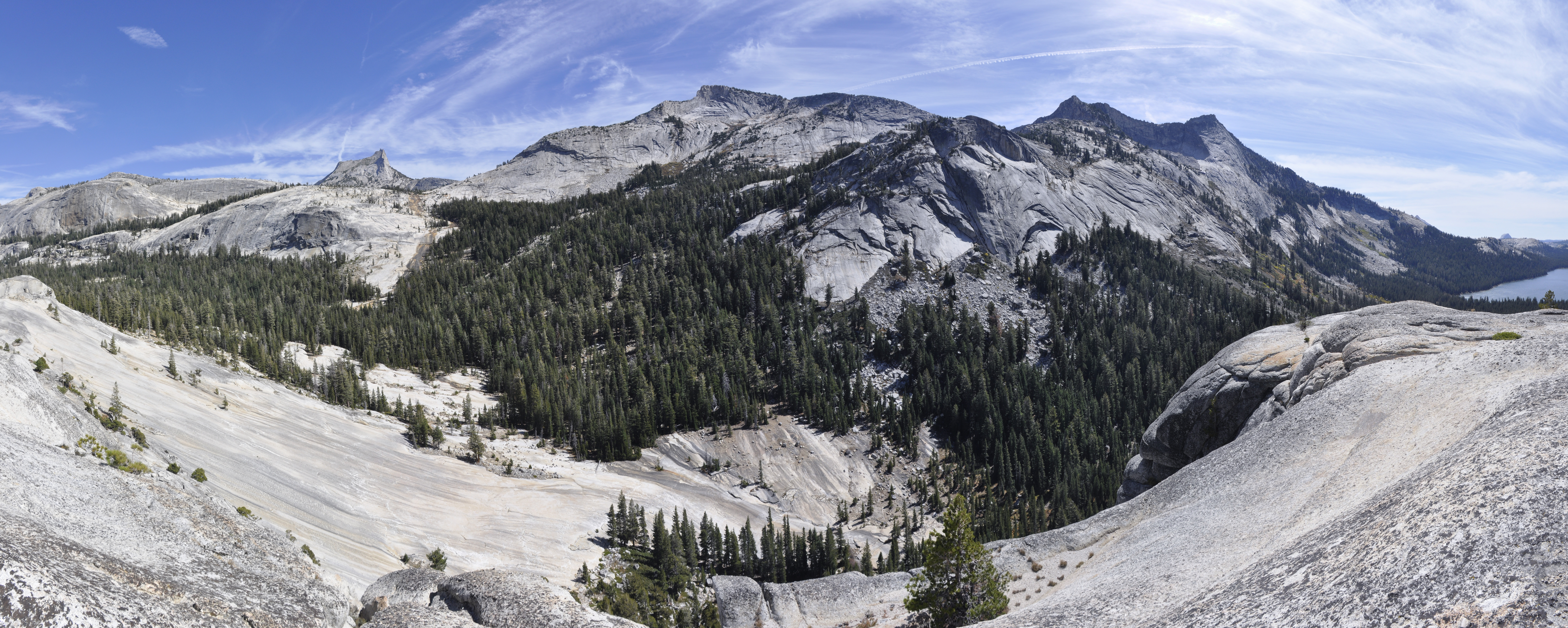
- Northwest peak of Tresidder Peak or Peak 10,450 (in the center) and Southern peak of Tresidder Peak (to the right), seen from Pywiack Dome summit.

Highest point
- Elevation: 10,605+ ft (3233+ m) NAVD 88
- Prominence: 880 ft (268 m)
- Coordinates: 37°49′47″N 119°25′20″W

Geography
- Location within California Location within the United States
- Location: Mariposa County, California, U.S.
- Parent range: Cathedral Range, Sierra Nevada
- Topo map: USGS Tenaya Lake

Climbing
- First ascent: North arête, July 4, 1966, by Bruce Kinnison, Alan Zetterberg, and Pierre Zetterberg
- Easiest route: Both the north and south arêtes are rock climbs (class 4)

Tresidder Peak is a mountain in Yosemite National Park, California. The mountain has two summits (peaks or arêtes), about half a mile (800 meters) apart, with the southern peak being the highest. The elevation of the south peak has not been exactly determined but is given as between 10,605 feet (3,232 m) and 10,645 feet (3,245 m). The northern peak is identified on maps as Peak 10,450 and has an elevation of 10,450 feet (3,185 m).

It is the line parent of Clouds Rest, and is named for Donald Tresidder, a former president of Stanford University who had a longtime association with Yosemite National Park.

Cathedral Lakes are near.
