= Marmot Dome =

Granite dome in Yosemite National Park, USA

- Location within California Location within the United States

Highest point
- Elevation: 9,280 ft (2,830 m) NAVD 88
- Prominence: 40 ft (12 m) NAVD 88
- Coordinates: 37.874°N 119.398°W

Geography
- Location: Yosemite National Park, Tuolumne County, California, U.S.
- Parent range: Sierra Nevada

Marmot Dome is the one dome east of Fairview Dome, linked by an area called Razor Back. It is near Pothole Dome.

== On Marmot Dome's particulars ==
Marmot Dome is 9,252 feet (2,820 m) high.

== Rock climbing ==
Most rock climbing routes are north-facing slabs, thus early and late in the day the rock climbing routes tend to be in the shade.

== External links and references ==
- peakbagger.com on Marmot Dome
- One YouTube video
