= Waterwheel Falls =

Waterfall in California, United States

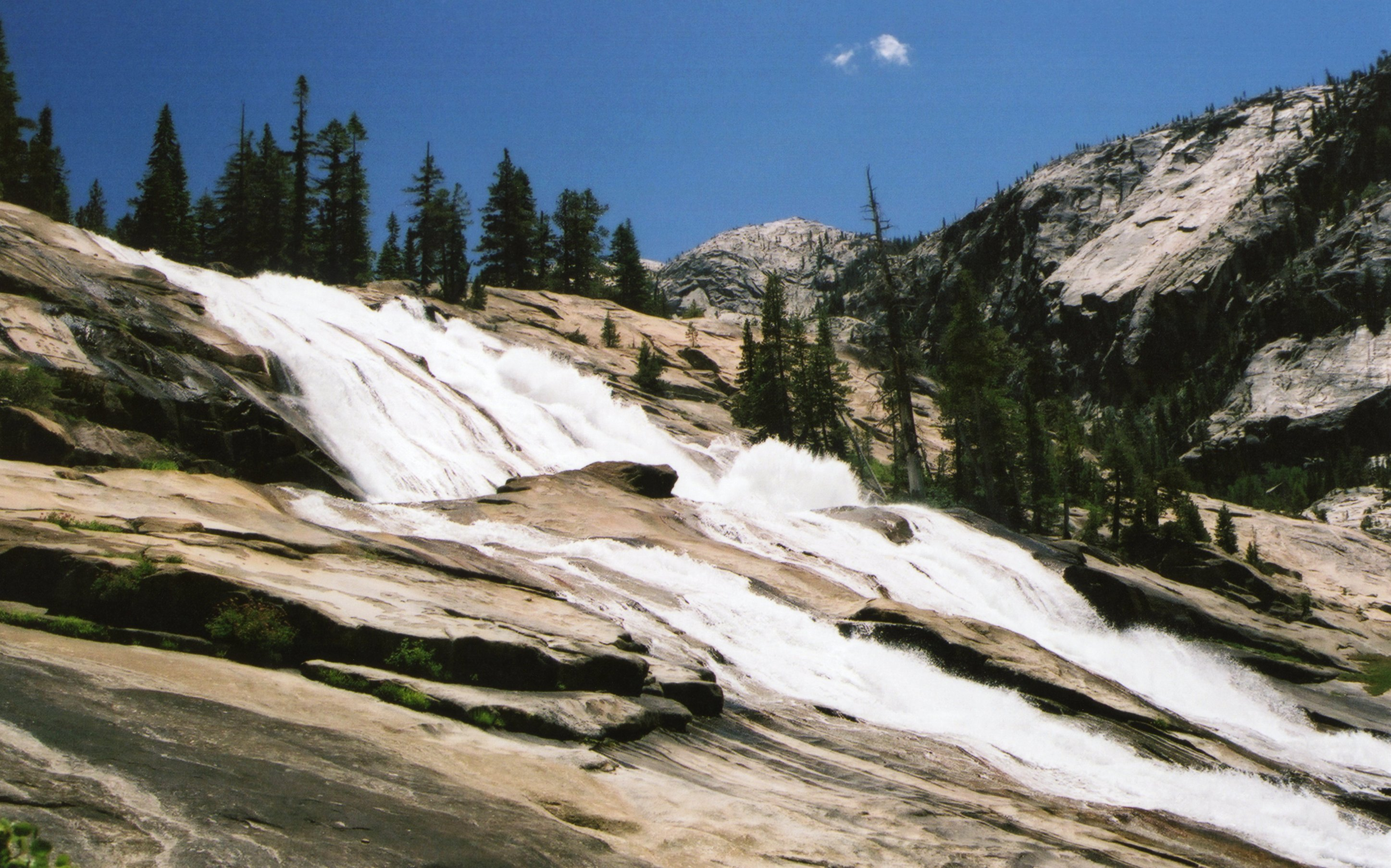
- Waterwheel Falls
- Interactive map of Waterwheel Falls
- Location: Grand Canyon of the Tuolumne, Yosemite National Park, California, U.S.
- Coordinates: 37°55′38″N 119°27′32″W
- Type: Slide

Waterwheel Falls is a waterfall in the Sierra Nevada of California, located in Yosemite National Park. It is the largest of the many waterfalls of the Tuolumne River. Its upper part contains a series of small ledges, each of which creates a small plume as the water is deflected away from the rock face. A regular phenomenon appears at the first and largest of these ledges during the high-water season of early summer. Strong gusts of wind can lift part of the spray and blow it back upward, causing it to reenter the falls above the ledge. This cyclic "waterwheel" gives the falls their name.

== See also ==
- List of waterfalls
- List of waterfalls in California
