= Cockscomb (Tuolumne Meadows) =

Mountain in Yosemite National Park, California

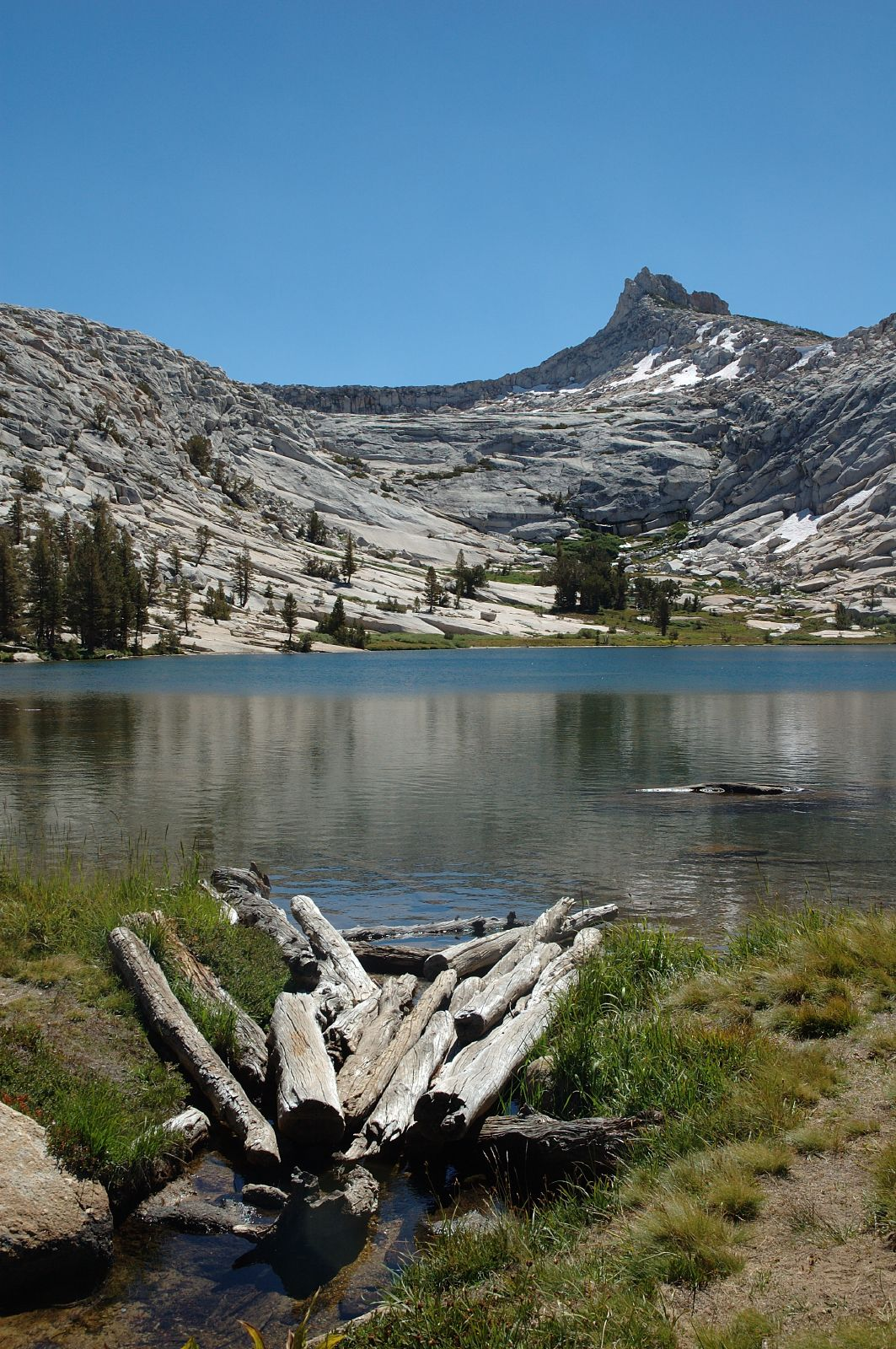
- Budd Lake, Cockscomb in the background

Highest point
- Elevation: 11,065 ft (3,373 m) NAVD 88
- Coordinates: 37.83560°N 119.3836°W

Geography
- Location: Yosemite National Park, Mariposa County, California, U.S.
- Parent range: Sierra Nevada

Cockscomb is a mountain, in the area of Tuolumne Meadows, Yosemite National Park, California.

== On Cockscomb's particulars ==
Cockscomb is aptly named, notably when viewed from the northwest. It is located in the Yosemite Wilderness, and is often forgotten, due to its proximity to Cathedral Peak, Matthes Crest, and Echo Peaks, but it deserves to be climbed.

== The proximity of Cockscomb ==
Cockscomb is near Echo Peaks, Unicorn Peak, Cathedral Peak, Matthes Crest, Budd Lake, also Elizabeth Lake.

== Rock climbing on Cockscomb ==
None of Cockscomb's routes walk-ups, the easiest a Class 4. Cockscomb has two summits, a west and an east, separated by about 10 feet (3.0 m), with a sharp notch between. The west summit is a small perch, which can barely hold two people, while the east summit is a knife-edge, a dangerous perch. Their altitudes are within a few inches of each other, so saying which is higher is problematic. The west summit appears to be climbed more often, while the east summit is more difficult to climb. There are beautiful views from the top.

== On the "Cathedral Traverse" ==
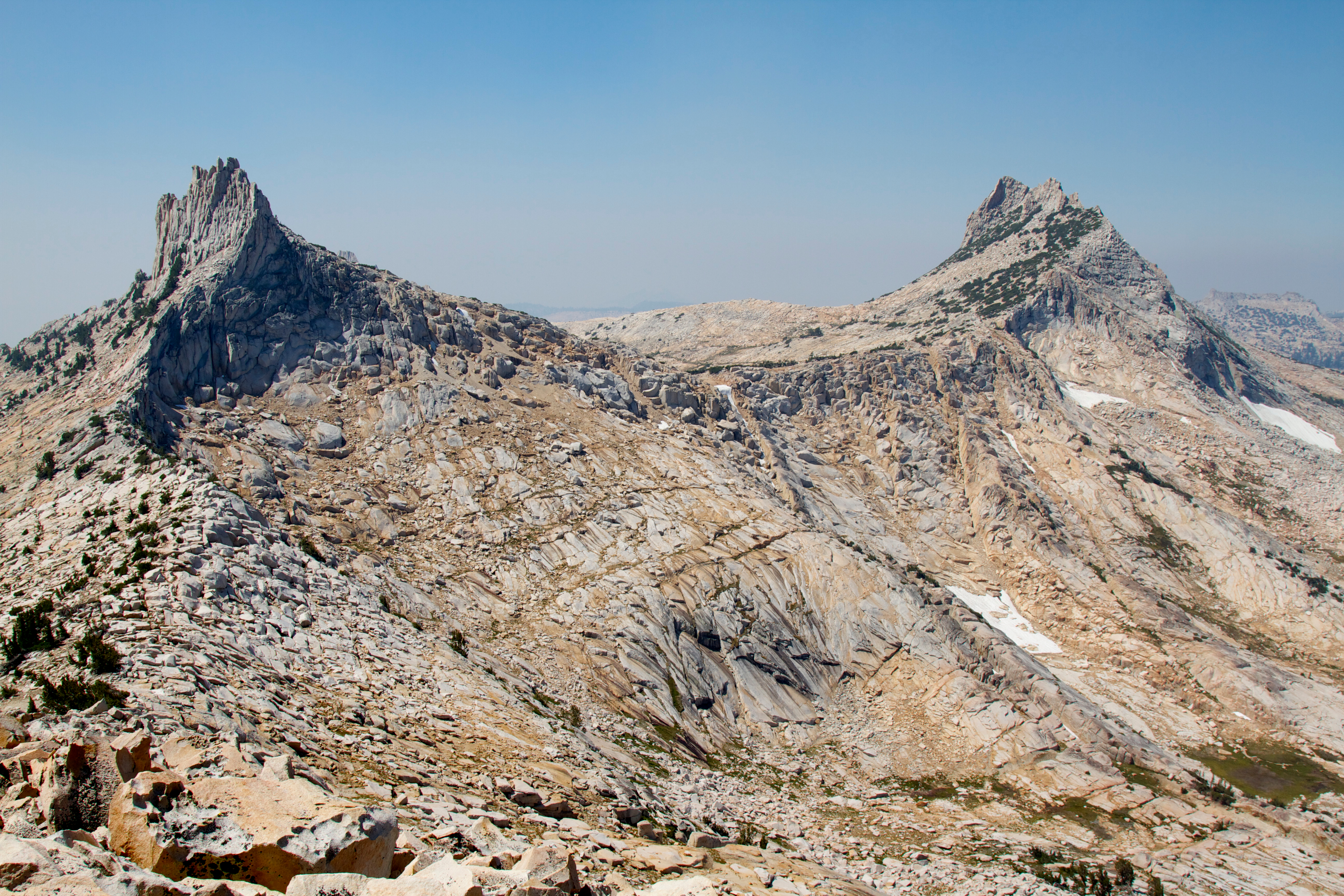
Cockscomb (left) and Echo Peaks (right)

The "Cathedral Traverse" includes five summits:

1. Starting with the Southeast Buttress of Cathedral Peak, then head south, to climb the highest,
2. Echo Peak, then skip the other Echo peaks to traverse over,
3. Echo Ridge (Toulumne Meadows),
4. Cockscomb, and finally end at
5. Unicorn Peak.
