= Matthes Crest =

Mountain in the American state of California

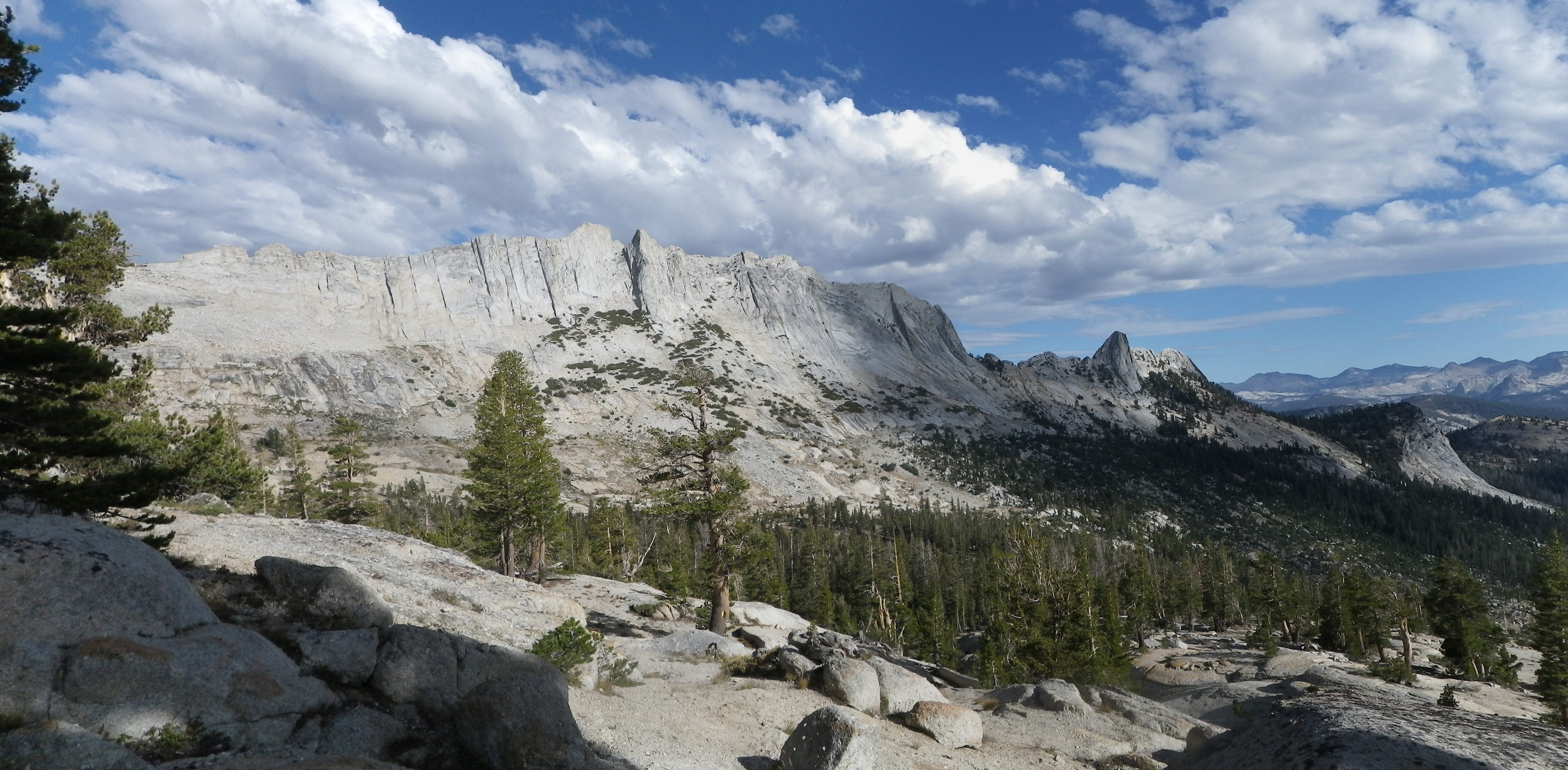
- Matthes crest from the west side.

Highest point
- Elevation: 10,923 ft (3,329 m) NAVD 88
- Prominence: 278 ft (85 m)
- Parent peak: Echo Ridge
- Coordinates: 37°49′24″N 119°23′51″W

Geography
- Location within California
- Location: Yosemite National Park; Mariposa County, California, U.S.
- Parent range: Cathedral Range, Sierra Nevada
- Topo map: USGS Tenaya Lake

Geology
- Rock age: Cretaceous
- Mountain type: Granite arête

Climbing
- First ascent: 1931 by Jules Eichorn, Glen Dawson and Walter Brem
- Easiest route: Rock climb class 5.7

Matthes Crest is an approximately mile-long fin of rock with two summits separated by a deep notch. It is a part of the Cathedral Range, which is a mountain range in the south-central portion of Yosemite National Park. The range is part of the Sierra Nevada.

== History and geology ==
Matthes Crest is named for François E. Matthes, a cartographer and author who described the geology in the region where Matthes Crest lies. It was originally named Echo Ridge due to its proximity to the Echo Peaks. Matthes crest arose as a nunatak in the glacial field which covered Tuolumne during the last ice age.

== Climbing ==
The first known ascent of Matthes Crest was by Jules Eichorn, Glen Dawson, and Walter Brem on June 16, 1931. Climbing Matthes Crest by traversing the ridge from south to north is a popular alpine climbing activity today.

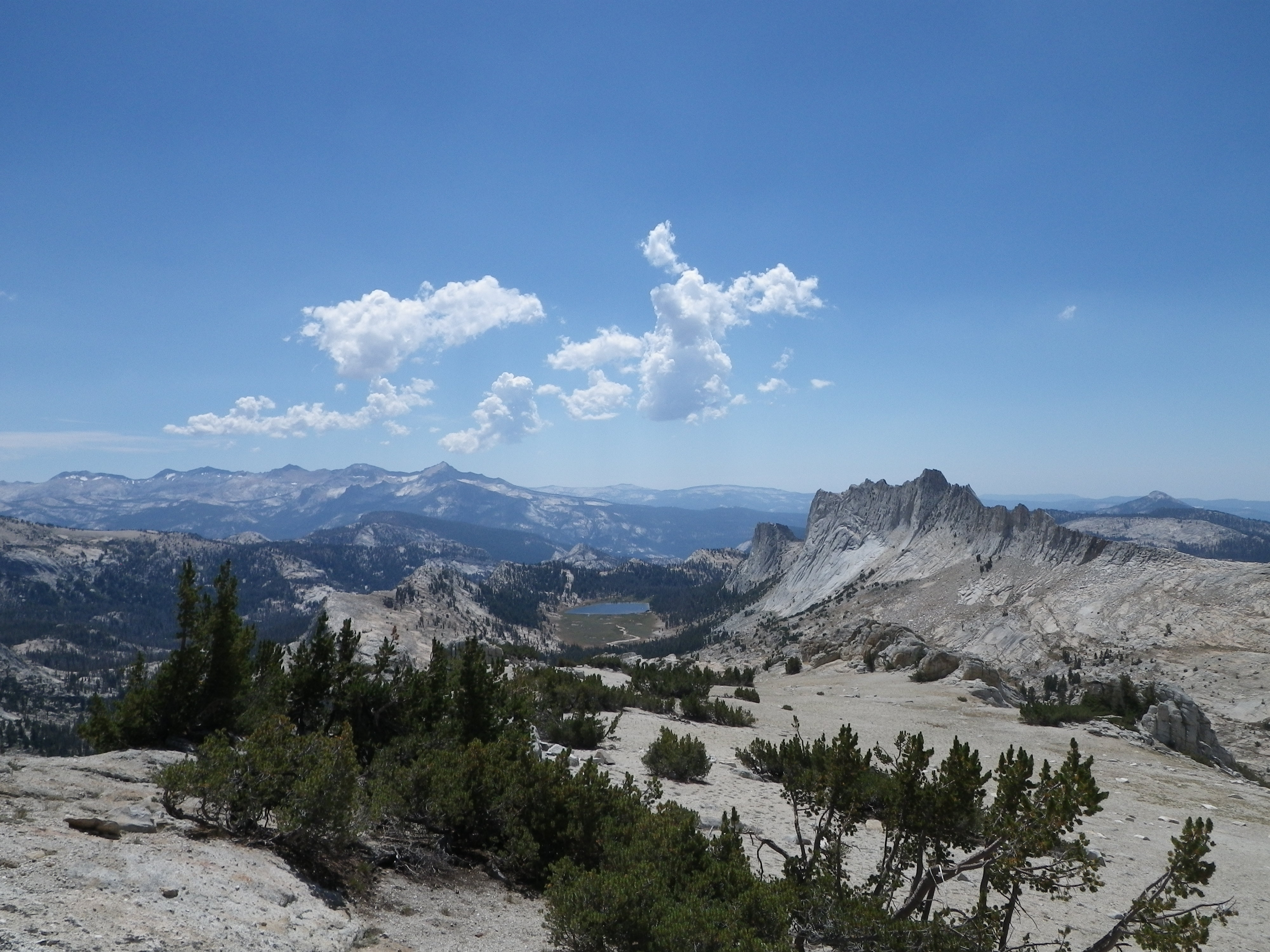
From the northeast side

== See also ==
- Budd Lake, a lake which is near Matthes Crest
- Cathedral Peak, a mountain fairly near Matthes Crest
- Cockscomb, another mountain fairly near Matthes Crest
- Elizabeth Lake, also fairly near
