= Tuolumne Meadows =

Meadow in Yosemite National Park, US

- U.S. National Register of Historic Places
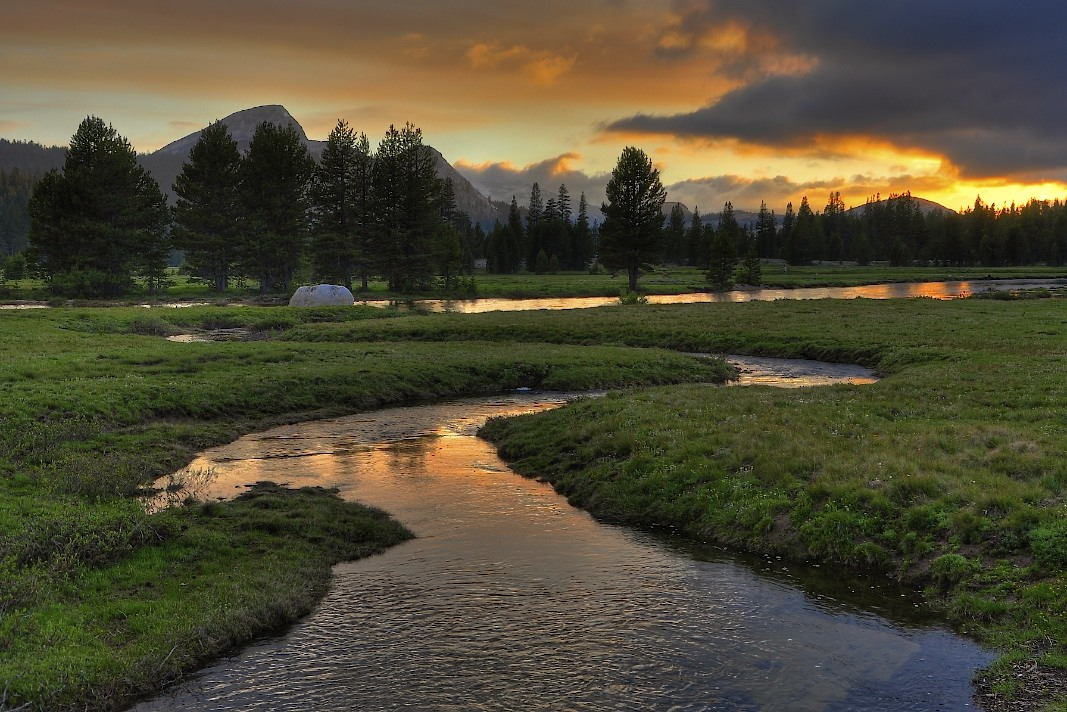
- Sunset over Tuolumne River by Tuolumne Meadows

- Location within California Location within the United States
- Nearest city: Lee Vining, California
- Area: 0.4 acres (0.16 ha)
- Built: 1934
- Built by: Civilian Conservation Corps
- Architect: Wosky, John
- Architectural style: National Park Service rustic
- NRHP reference No.: 78000371
- Added to NRHP: November 30, 1978

Tuolumne Meadows (/tuˈɒləmi/) is a gentle, dome-studded, sub-alpine meadow area along the Tuolumne River in the eastern section of Yosemite National Park in the United States. Its approximate location is 37°52.5′N 119°21′W. Its approximate elevation is 8,619 feet (2,627 m). The term Tuolumne Meadows is also often used to describe a large portion of the Yosemite high country around the meadows, especially in context of rock climbing.

== Natural history ==
The meadow vegetation is supported by shallow groundwater. The water comes from 1,000 mm (39 inches) of precipitation annually, predominantly in the form of snow. Water arises from snowmelt and hill-slope aquifers, and flows through the Tuolumne River, Budd Creek, Delaney Creek, and Unicorn Creek. In spring, as soon as the snow melts, it is not uncommon to see large areas of the meadows flooded and practically transformed into lakes.

While the mountains of the Sierra Nevada near the meadows have had some permanent snowfields, in the summer they are mostly free of snow. Although brief, the late spring and summer wildflower bloom in Tuolumne Meadows is host to a wide variety of California wildflowers, including the relatively rare Purple Webber, a type of lupin.

Plant species composition changes across the meadows with different landforms, landscape positions, and summer water-table depths. Areas with seasonal flooding and deep-standing water support the inflated sedge and Sierra willow. The main herbaceous wet meadow species include alpine aster, nearly-black sedge, King's ricegrass, western bistort, Breweri's reed grass, and dwarf bilberry. Thread-leaved sedge, pussy-toes, Sierra lodgepole pine, and Ross sedge are found in drier uplands within or on the edge of the meadows.

== Climate ==
Climate data for Tuolumne Meadows, California (8694ft or 2650m), 1991–2020 normals
| Month | Jan | Feb | Mar | Apr | May | Jun | Jul | Aug | Sep | Oct | Nov | Dec | Year |
|---|---|---|---|---|---|---|---|---|---|---|---|---|---|
| Mean daily maximum °F (°C) | 40.6 (4.8) | 38.5 (3.6) | 42.1 (5.6) | 45.4 (7.4) | 53.8 (12.1) | 64.6 (18.1) | 71.5 (21.9) | 70.3 (21.3) | 64.9 (18.3) | 57.2 (14.0) | 46.7 (8.2) | 39.5 (4.2) | 52.9 (11.6) |
| Daily mean °F (°C) | 26.7 (−2.9) | 25.3 (−3.7) | 28.5 (−1.9) | 33.7 (0.9) | 40.4 (4.7) | 48.8 (9.3) | 55.0 (12.8) | 53.4 (11.9) | 48.7 (9.3) | 41.7 (5.4) | 33.3 (0.7) | 25.8 (−3.4) | 38.4 (3.6) |
| Mean daily minimum °F (°C) | 12.8 (−10.7) | 12.1 (−11.1) | 14.9 (−9.5) | 21.9 (−5.6) | 26.9 (−2.8) | 32.9 (0.5) | 38.5 (3.6) | 36.5 (2.5) | 32.4 (0.2) | 26.2 (−3.2) | 19.8 (−6.8) | 12.0 (−11.1) | 23.9 (−4.5) |
| Average precipitation inches (mm) | 6.19 (157) | 3.99 (101) | 4.21 (107) | 2.04 (52) | 1.70 (43) | 0.64 (16) | 0.54 (14) | 0.53 (13) | 0.52 (13) | 1.80 (46) | 3.10 (79) | 4.56 (116) | 29.82 (757) |
Source: NOAA

== Recreation ==
Tuolumne Meadows has a good view of the Cathedral Range and Unicorn Peak (to the south), Lembert Dome, and Mount Dana (to the east). Camping is available at the Tuolumne Meadows campground (reservations recommended). Excellent hiking and rock climbing are accessible from Tuolumne Meadows, which tends to be less crowded than Yosemite Valley. Downstream (flowing to the right (western) side of the image), the Tuolumne River cascades over Waterwheel Falls near Glen Aulin, eventually pooling at Hetch Hetchy Reservoir.

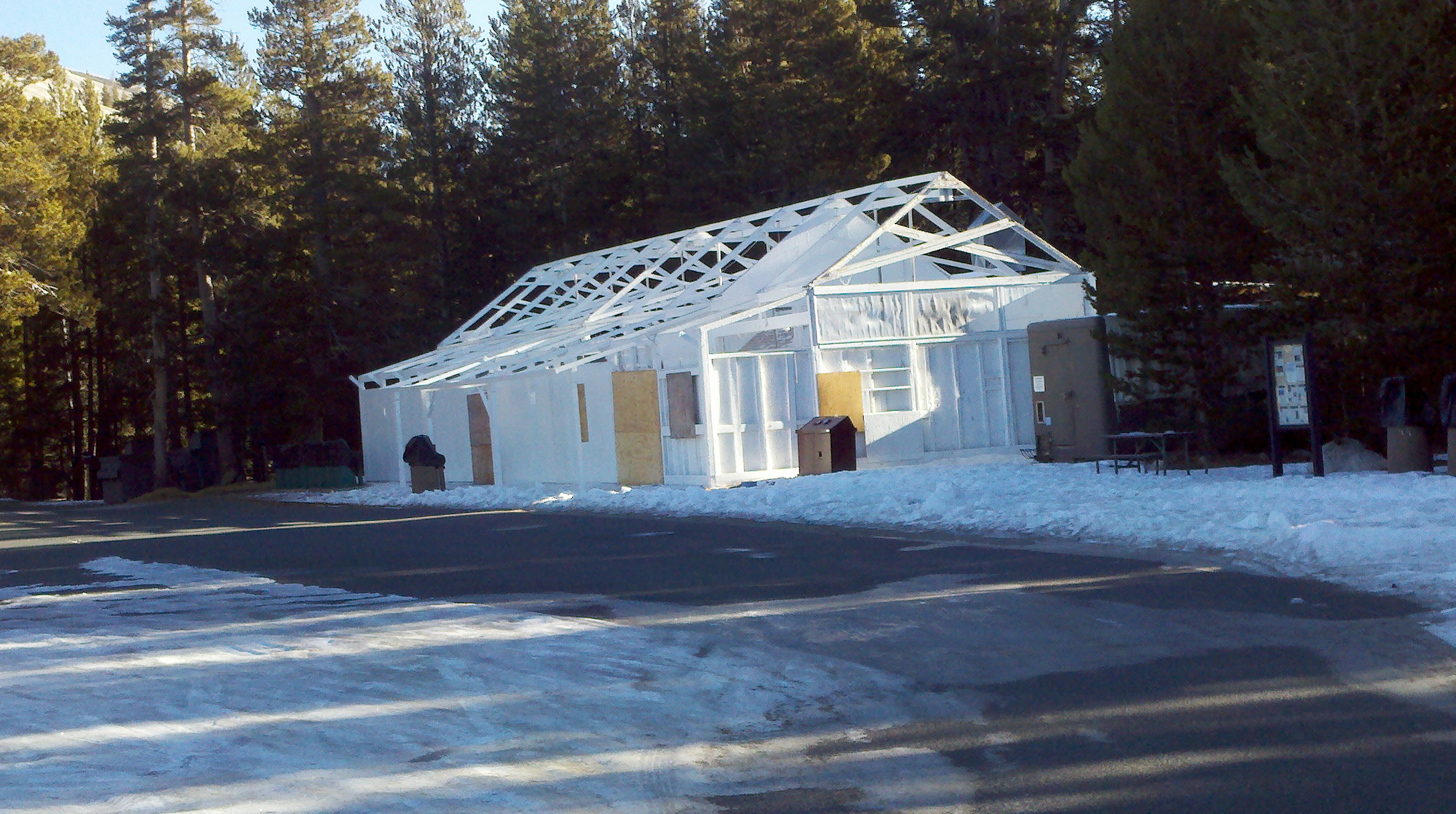
Tuolumne Meadows store in winter

The road to the meadows is generally free of snow from June through October. Due to the extreme elevation, road access over Tioga Pass along Highway 120 is closed through winter season.

=== Hiking ===
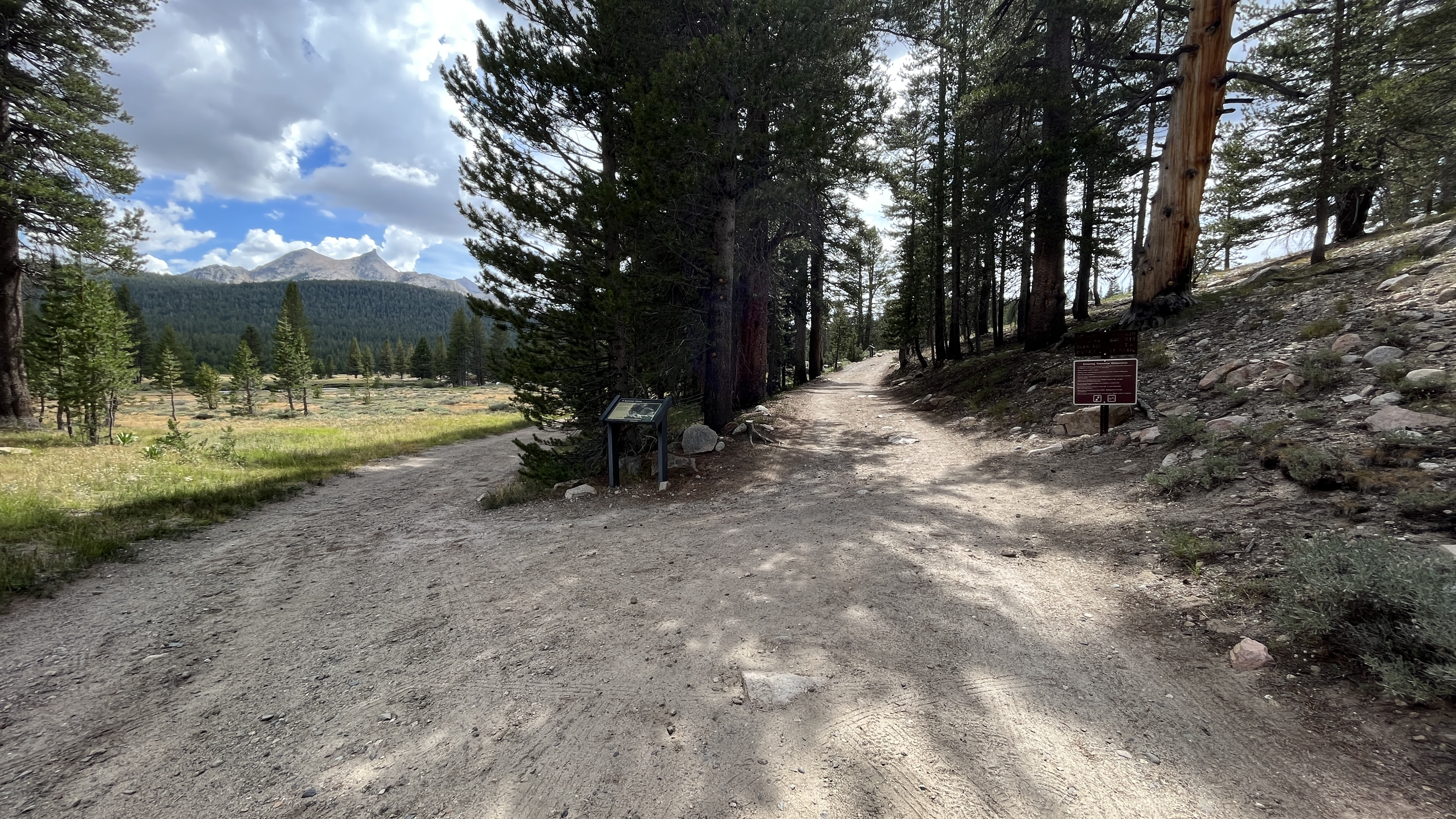
The Pacific Crest Trail/John Muir Trail Junction near Tuolumne Meadows in Yosemite

Many backcountry hiking and backpacking trails start in Tuolumne Meadows including the primary route to summit Mount Lyell, the highest peak in Yosemite National Park. The John Muir and the Pacific Crest Trails are long-distance backpacking trails and follow a route through Lyell Canyon into Tuolumne Meadows. A large number of backpackers hike these trails each year. Along with these longer trails, Tuolumne Meadows feature a wide range of day trails to locations including Gaylor Lakes, Cathedral Lakes, Mono Pass, and Lembert Dome. The day hike trails are popular, and become busy during the summer high seasons. These trails are serviced by the Tuolumne Meadows shuttle bus, typically from June to September, though the dates are subject to change due to weather.

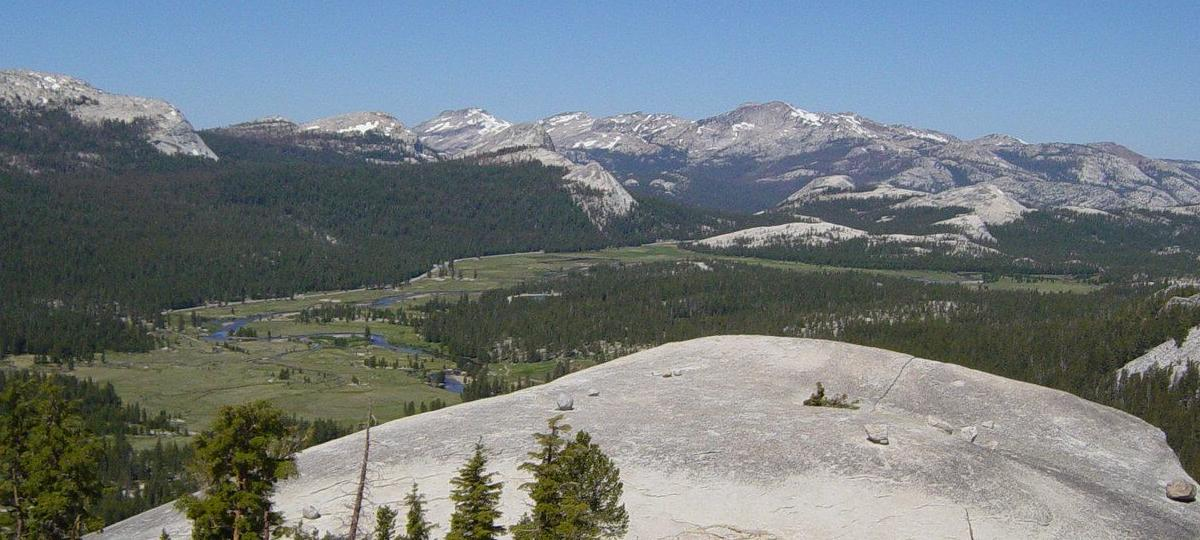
Looking west over Tuolumne Meadows, from high on Lembert Dome

=== Rock climbing ===
In contrast to the big walls of Yosemite Valley, climbing at Tuolumne generally consists of short- to medium-length routes on eleven major domes and a number of minor ones, stretching from the Stately Pleasure Dome above Tenaya Lake to Lembert Dome on the east side of the Meadows. Since the area is all at a high elevation, the climbing season is mainly limited to June through September.

The rock is porphyritic granite, a very strong form of granite. It has a tendency for exfoliation, which helps produce and preserve the distinctive dome shapes. The resulting climbing includes both face and crack routes, the former often runout due to limited numbers of bolts, and the latter frequently following very thin cracks. The local ethic is to limit the placement of bolts on new routes and to forbid the addition of bolts to existing routes, resulting in distances of 40 feet (12 m) or more between bolts.

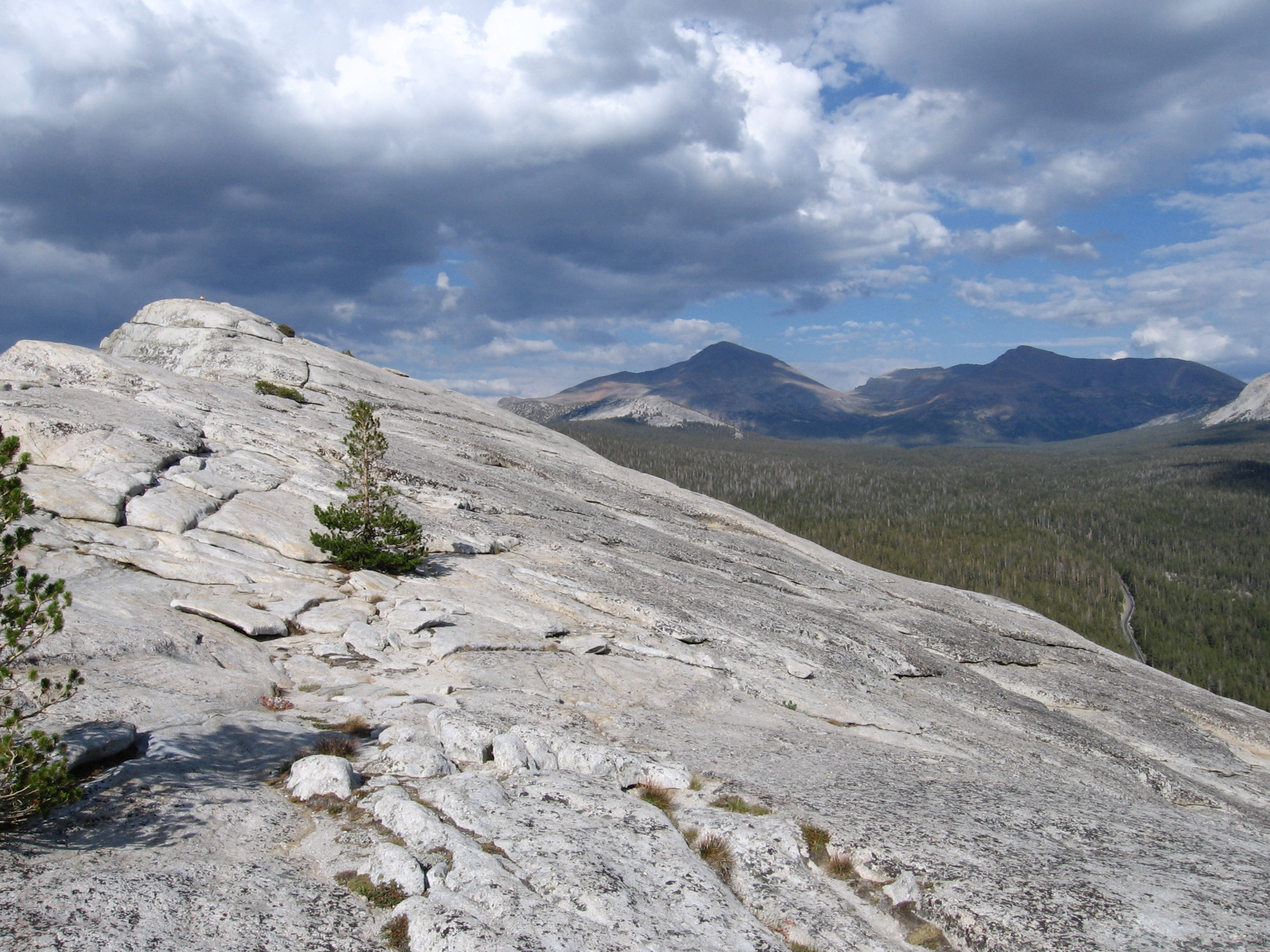
The view looking east from Lembert Dome

The major domes include:

- Stately Pleasure Dome
- Polly Dome
- Daff Dome
- Pothole Dome
- Lembert Dome
- Fairview Dome

See Granite Domes of Yosemite National Park for a list of granite domes in Yosemite National park, not just around Tuolumne.

In addition, the peaks of the nearby Cathedral Range, such as Cathedral Peak, Pywiack Dome, and Medlicott Dome, are traditionally considered part of the climbing area.

== Infrastructure ==
The Tuolumne Meadows area is served by the Tioga Pass Road (California SR 120), which had been paved by the 1920s. Its present route through the meadows was laid out in the 1930s by the Civilian Conservation Corps. A housing area for seasonal employees was relocated at that time, whose new site includes a surviving collection of fine National Park Service rustic CCC-built structures listed on the National Register of Historic Places as "Tuolumne Meadows" in 1978.
