= Cathedral Peak (California) =

Mountain in Yosemite National Park, California

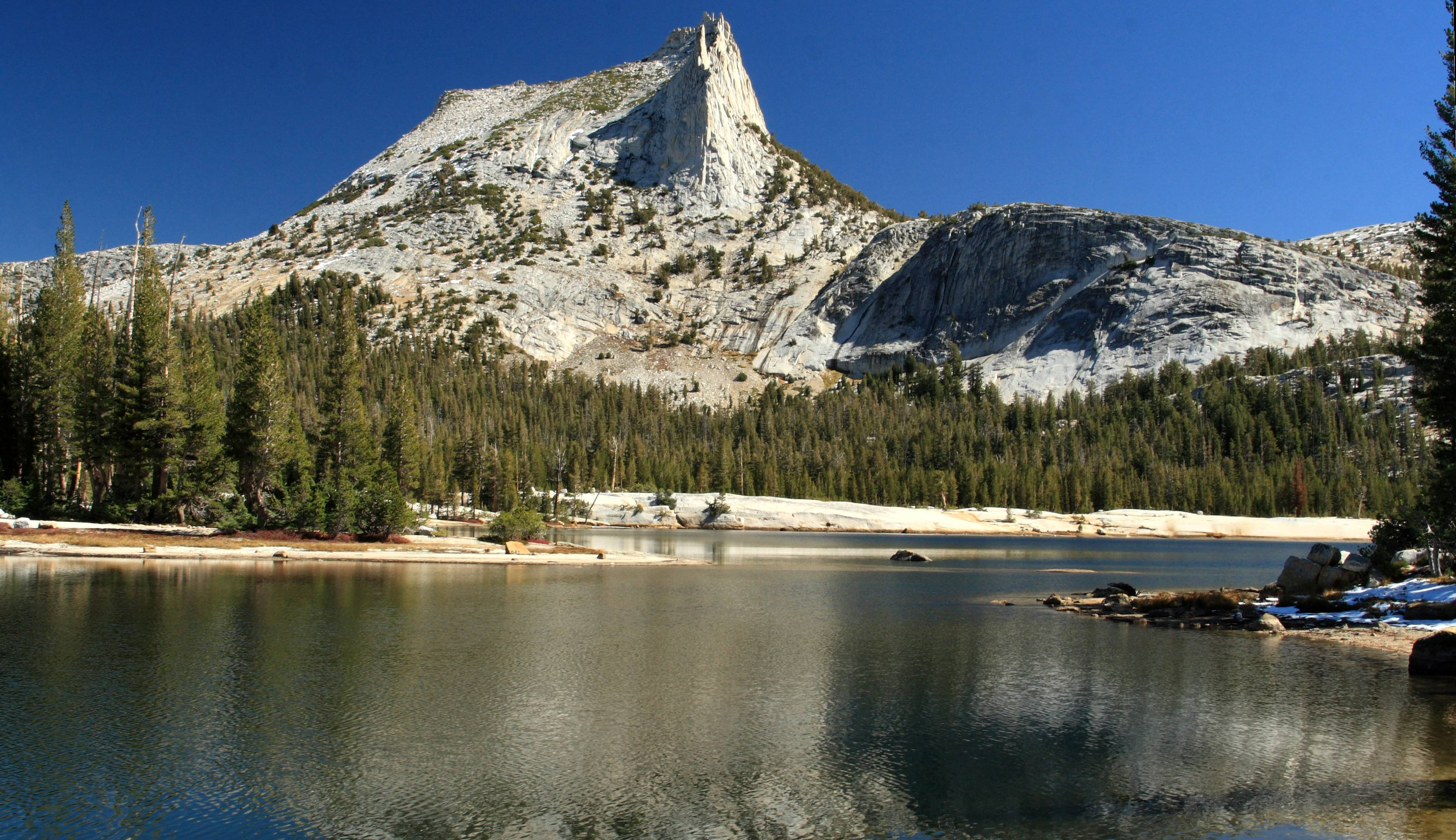
- Cathedral Peak and Lower Cathedral Lake

Highest point
- Elevation: 10,916 ft (3,327 m) NAVD 88
- Prominence: 919 ft (280 m)
- Listing: SPS Mountaineers peak
- Coordinates: 37°50′52″N 119°24′20″W

Geography
- Location: Yosemite National Park, California, U.S.
- Parent range: Cathedral Range, Sierra Nevada
- Topo map: USGS Tenaya Lake

Geology
- Rock age: Cretaceous
- Mountain type: Granite arête

Climbing
- First ascent: 1869 by John Muir
- Easiest route: Rock climb class 4

Cathedral Peak is part of the Cathedral Range, a mountain range in the south-central portion of Yosemite National Park in eastern Mariposa and Tuolumne Counties. The range is an offshoot of the Sierra Nevada. The peak which lends its name to the range derives its name from its cathedral-shaped peak, which was formed by glacial activity: the peak remained uneroded above the glaciers in the Pleistocene.

== Geography ==
Cathedral Peak has a subsidiary summit to the west called Eichorn Pinnacle, for Jules Eichorn, who first ascended a class 5.4 route to its summit on July 24, 1931, with Glen Dawson.

In 1869, John Muir wrote in My first summer in the Sierra:

The body of the Cathedral is nearly square, and the roof slopes are wonderfully regular and symmetrical, the ridge trending northeast and southwest. This direction has apparently been determined by structure joints in the granite. The gable on the northeast end is magnificent in size and simplicity, and at its base there is a big snow-bank protected by the shadow of the building. The front is adorned with many pinnacles and a tall spire of curious workmanship. Here too the joints in the rock are seen to have played an important part in determining their forms and size and general arrangement. The Cathedral is said to be about eleven thousand feet above the sea, but the height of the building itself above the level of the ridge it stands on is about fifteen hundred feet. A mile or so to the westward there is a handsome lake, and the glacier-polished granite about it is shining so brightly it is not easy in some places to trace the line between the rock and water, both shining alike.

== Geology ==
The Cathedral Peak Granodiorite of Cathedral Peak is an intrusion into an area of older intrusive (or plutonic) and metamorphic rock in the Sierra Nevada Batholith. It is part of a grouping of intrusions called the Tuolumne Intrusive Suite. Cathedral Peak is the youngest of the rock formations in the Suite, dating to the Cretaceous Period at 83 million years ago. Its composition is mainly granodiorite with phenocrysts of microcline.

Cathedral Peak was a nunatak during the Tioga glaciation of the last ice age, the peak projected above the glaciers, which carved and sharpened the peak's base while plucking away at its sides.

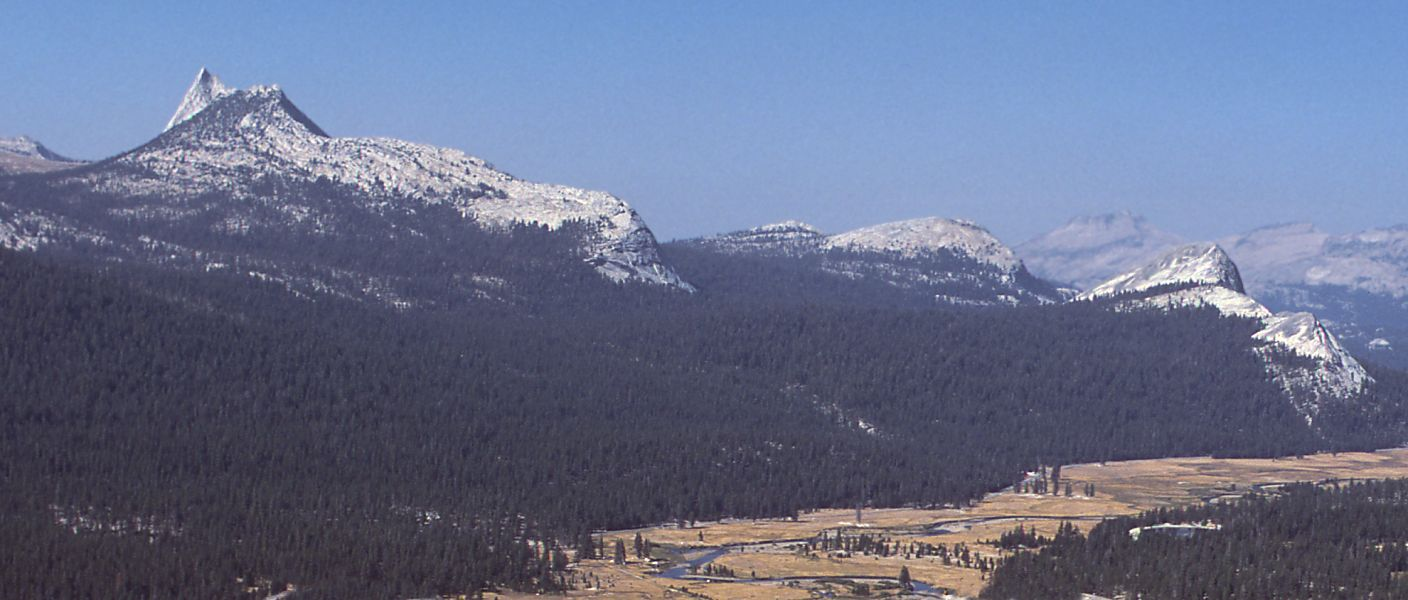
Cathedral Peak, looking southwest across Tuolumne Meadows.

== See also ==
- Budd Lake, fairly near Cathedral Peak
- Cathedral Lakes, which are directly below Cathedral Peak
- Cockscomb, another mountain fairly near Cathedral Peak
- Echo Peaks, mountains near Cathedral Peak
- Elizabeth Lake, also fairly near Cathedral Peak
- Matthes Crest, a mountain which is near Cathedral Peak
- Unicorn Peak, a peak which is near Cathedral Peak
