= Cathedral Lakes =

Two lakes in Yosemite National Park, California. The lakes are near Cathedral Peak

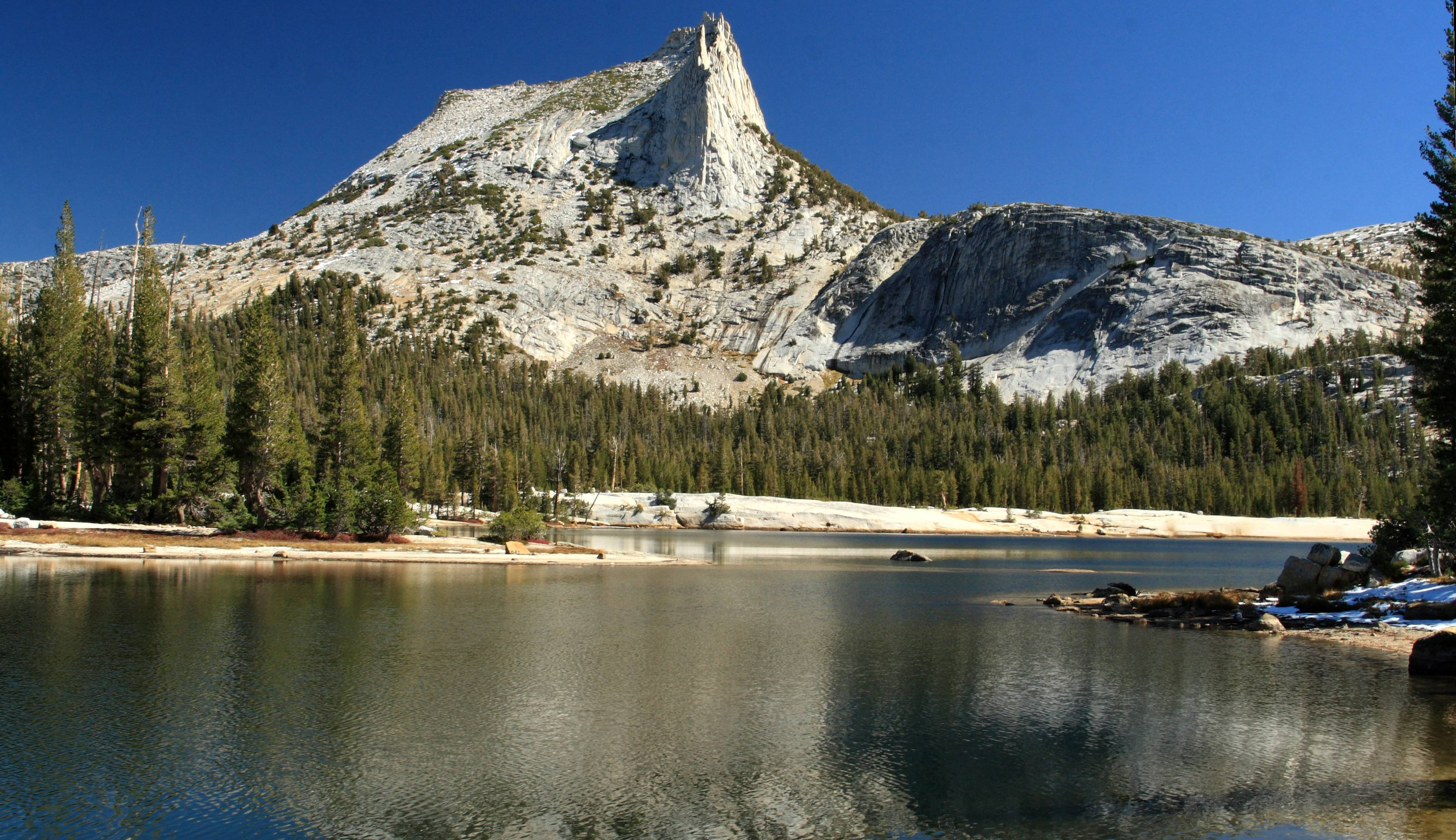
- Lower Cathedral Lake, in the foreground, occupies a basin excavated in the granite by the ancient glaciers.

- Location within California Location within the United States
- Location: Yosemite National Park, Mariposa County, California
- Coordinates: 37.843814°N 119.421825°W
- Basin countries: United States
- Surface elevation: 2,835 m (9,301 ft)

The Cathedral Lakes are two lakes located In Yosemite National Park, Mariposa County, California. The lakes are situated 1.6 km (1 mi) southwest of Cathedral Peak and 3.2 km (2 mi) east-northeast of Tenaya Lake. The lower lake is located at elevation 9,288 feet (2,831 m), while the upper lake is located at elevation 9,585 feet (2,922 m). Tresidder Peak is also nearby, as well as the John Muir Trail with a 7 miles (11 km) round trip hike from the trailhead in Tuolumne Meadows.

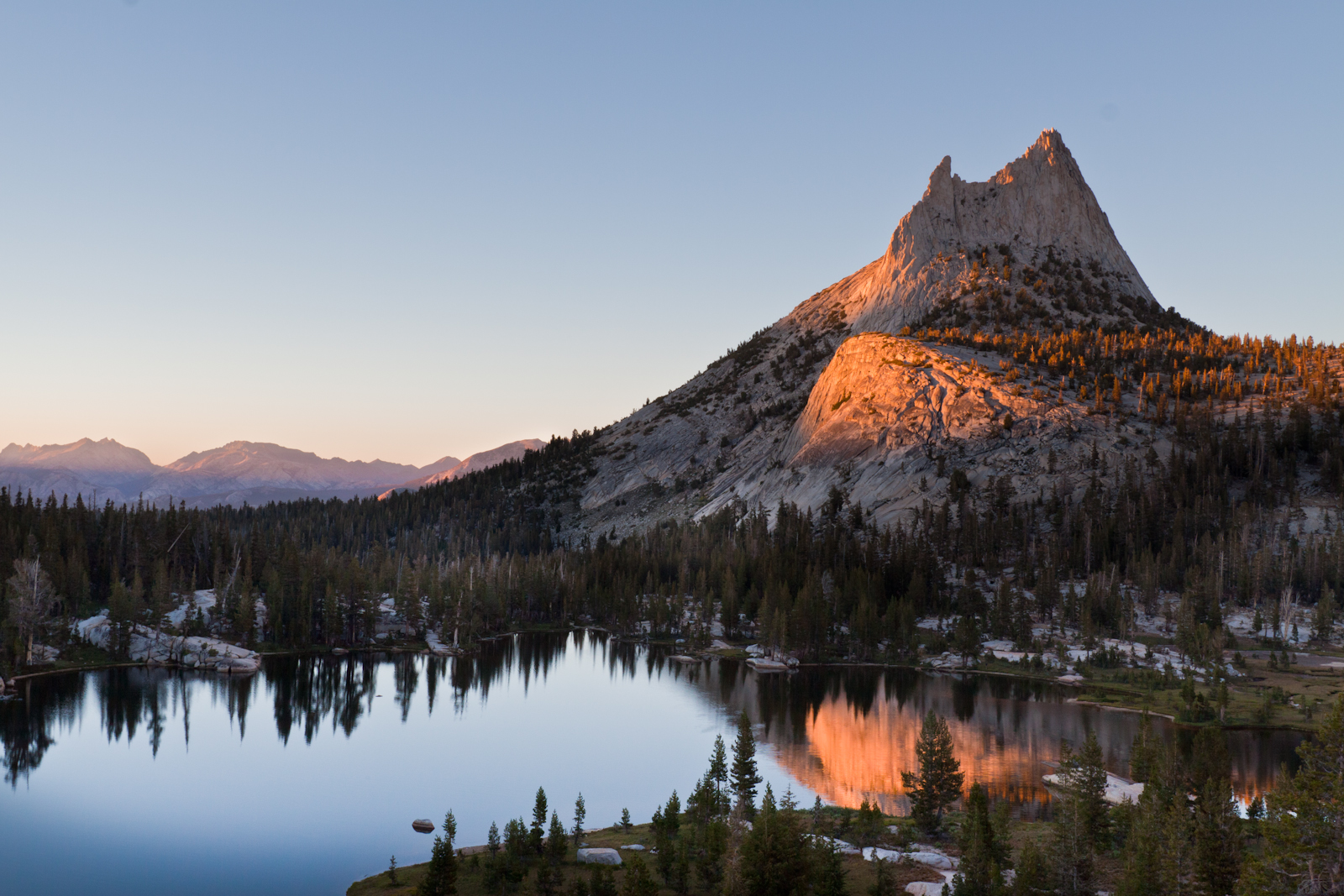
Upper Cathedral Lake at Sunset

== See also ==
- List of lakes in California
