= Ackerson Meadow =

Wetland in California

Coordinates: 37°50′21″N 119°50′16″W

Ackerson Meadow is a 230-acre (93 ha) wetland and riparian ecosystem on the western slopes of the Sierra Nevada located 12 miles (19 km) northwest of Yosemite Valley. While previously under private ownership, the meadow sits in between Yosemite National Park and the Stanislaus National Forest. The meadow system itself is divided into the Main and South Ackerson Meadow, with the South Fork of the Tuolumne River running through the main meadow.

The extensive meadow system is highly dependent on a high water table from winter snowmelt, which contributes to vegetation establishment. As a result, the meadow serves as a critical wildlife corridor and provides habitat for various species, including 57 species of birds and rare endemic species like the Pacific fisher and Northwest pond turtle. In addition to providing habitat, the wetland has several important functions like filtering pollutants, flood attenuation, sequestrating carbon, and providing recreational opportunities.

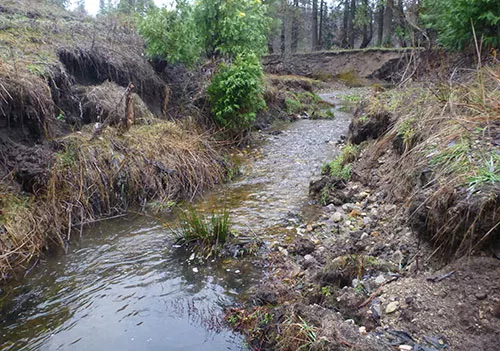
Gully at Ackerson Meadow

The property has been extensively used for agriculture and grazing sheep and cattle. Drainage ditches were also built throughout the property, to support these activities. The cumulative impact of these land use activities had significantly impacted both vegetation composition and hydrology. Invasive species like Medusahead grass, ripgut brome velvet grass had substantially expanded throughout the meadow, displacing native plants like monkeyflower. Furthermore, the drainage ditches expanded into an extensive network of gullies, which were responsible for draining 90 acres (36 ha) of wetlands and threatening another 100 acres (40 ha) of intact wetlands.

The 400-acre (160 ha) property was originally included in the proposed 1890 park boundary, but it was removed a few years later and added into the Stanislaus National Forest. Located in a remote, scenic area of the National Forest, developers attempted to purchase the property to build a resort. However, the property owners, Robin and Nacy Wainwright, decided it was better to give the land to the public for their enjoyment. In 2016, the Trust for Public Land, in cooperation with the NPS and Yosemite Conservancy, purchased the land for $2.3 million and subsequently donated it to the National Park Service. On September 7, 2016, the NPS accepted the donation of the land, making the meadow the largest addition to Yosemite since 1949.

The two agencies began the process of developing an environmental assessment in 2020, and it was approved by the NPS in 2021, with a finding of no significant impacts. Restoration actions, however, would not commence until the fall of 2023 and conclude in the spring of 2025. Funding for the $17.7 million project came from various sources, including American Rivers, the Bonneville Environmental Foundation, the California Department of Fish and Wildlife, the California Wildlife Conservation Board, Google, the National Park Foundation, the National Park Service, the U.S. Forest Service, and the Yosemite Conservancy.

The goals of the project as delineated by the environmental assessment, are as follows: Restore the 90 acres (36 ha) of degraded wetland habitat and its self-sustaining processes through the re-establishment of natural wetland hydrology by raising the water table and restoring sheet flow. Remove invasive species and revegetate using native species like willows and sedges. Protect the existing wetlands from erosion by filling gullies. Enhance the meadow’s resilience to climate change to preserve essential habitat for endemic species. Establish co-management with local tribes and allow grazing to continue on USFS lands.

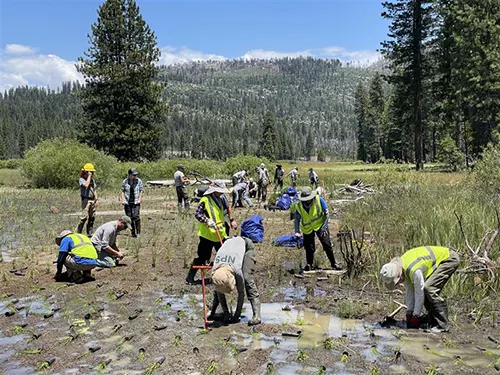
NPS employees and volunteers planting vegetation at Ackerson Meadow

To address the main issue of erosion at the wetland, material was excavated from nearby hillsides that burned in the 2013 Rim Fire and from thinning operations at the Merced Grove of giant sequoias. Recontouring and recompacting were completed afterwards to blend the excavated area to the local topography. The material was then used to fill gullies to the level of the surrounding meadow topography, thereby restoring wetland sheet flow and a high-water table. To prevent erosion from reoccurring, hand-built structures were placed perpendicular to attenuate water flow. Additionally, a rock apron protected with fences to allow vegetation to grow was constructed at the south end of the meadow where the wetland re-enters the South Fork of the Tuolumne River to prevent head cut erosion.

The removal of invasive species began prior to project work, with the use of herbicide on USFS lands and where necessary hand pulling was completed to protect sensitive ecological resources. To mitigate for construction impacts, species of interest in the project area were monitored or relocated if necessary by a on staff biologist like turtles or the California red-legged frog a federally listed species. To further minimize environmental impacts of construction, were possible the use of heavy equipment and mechanicals was minimized and, in some cases, was only used with the approval of the NPS and USFS. After gullies were filled and invasive species were removed, the wetland was revegetated using wetland container plants and via broadcast seeding of locally collected seeds. Willows and other rare or culturally important plants were salvaged prior to construction and replanted on top of renewed wetland soils. For vegetation recovery to be considered a success, 90% vegetative cover is necessary. Adaptive management is ongoing with monitoring being conducted by American Rivers, who are measuring changes in hydrology, carbon sequestration, and habitat recovery in the meadow.
