= Mather Pass =

Mountain pass in the Sierra Nevada, California

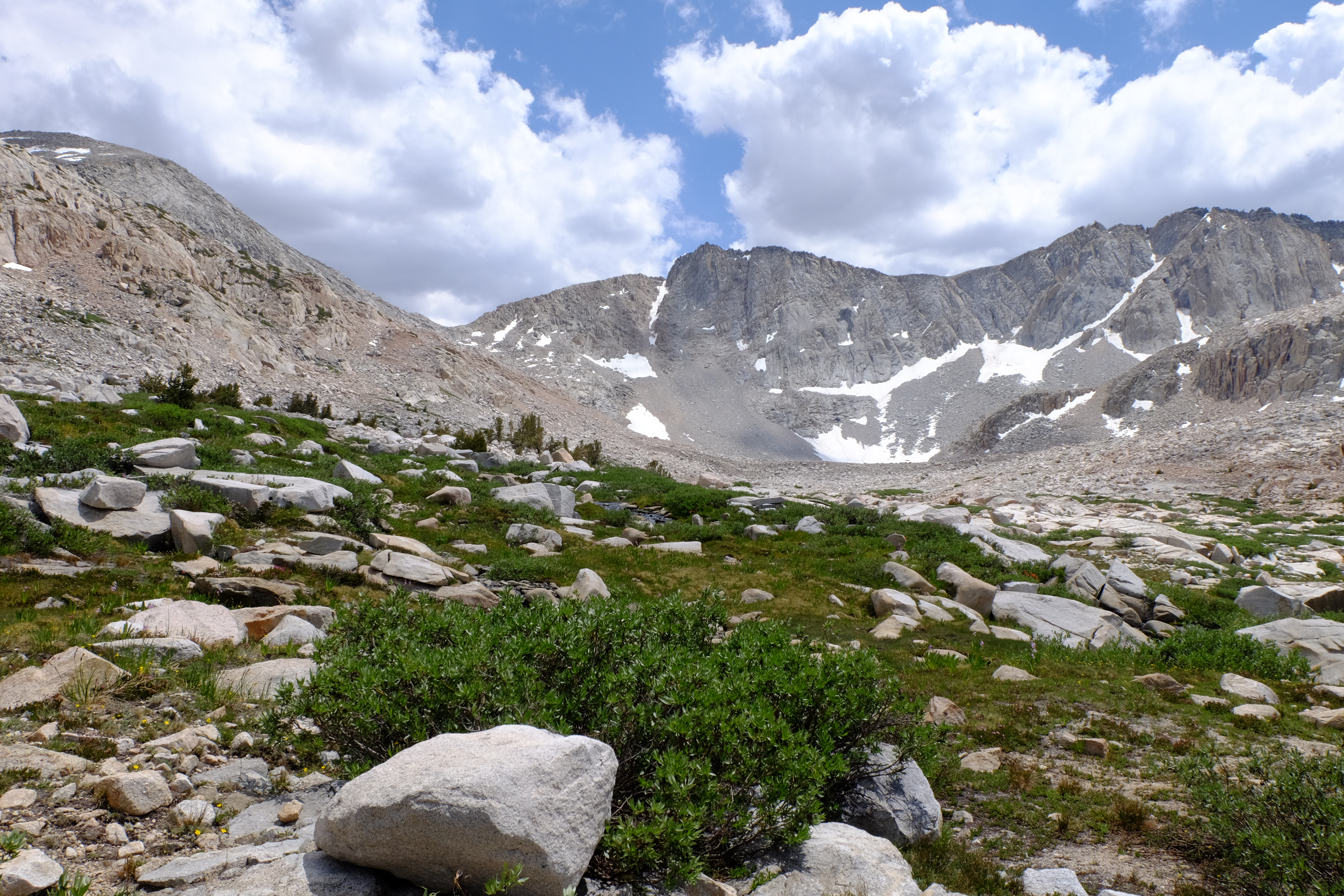
- Mather Pass, the low point in the ridgeline on the left, viewed from the north on the John Muir Trail

- Location within California
- Elevation: 12,068 ft (3,678 m)
- Traversed by: John Muir Trail; Pacific Crest Trail

Third Approach
- Location: Kings Canyon National Park, Fresno County, California, United States
- Range: Sierra Nevada
- Coordinates: 37°01′55″N 118°27′36″W
- Topo map: USGS Split Mountain

Mather Pass is a high mountain pass in the U.S. state of California's Sierra Nevada mountain range. It lies within far eastern Fresno County, inside Kings Canyon National Park and the Sequoia-Kings Canyon Wilderness. The pass lies at an elevation of 12,068 feet (3,678 m), separating Palisade Basin (containing the Palisade Lakes and Palisade Creek) to the north and Upper Basin (containing the headwaters of the South Fork Kings River) to the south.

The pass is traversed by the John Muir Trail and the Pacific Crest Trail, which are coincident (sharing the same route) between Crabtree Meadows and Tuolumne Meadows. It is one of the six high mountain passes above 11,000 feet on the John Muir Trail, along with Donohue Pass, Muir Pass, Pinchot Pass, Glen Pass, and Forester Pass; it lies south of Muir Pass and north of Pinchot Pass. Split Mountain, one of California's fourteeners, lies immediately southeast of Mather Pass; the Palisades group of peaks contains another three to the north of the pass.

== History ==
=== Early usage and trail construction ===
The pass was named for Stephen Mather, who served as the Assistant Secretary of the Interior and head of the National Park Service (NPS) from 1917 until 1929, by Chauncey J. Hamlin. Hamlin's was the first known party to cross Mather Pass by pack train in August 1921, taking 3 days to do so, as it was necessary for them to construct a rough trail. The party was the first to make the trip north on what became the John Muir Trail from Mount Whitney, and Hamlin advocated for state funds to be used to complete the route.

In 1923, Susan P. Thew led the third-ever pack train over the pass and became the first woman to cross the pass during a photography expedition through the Sierra.

During construction of the John Muir Trail, "serious consideration" was given to the idea of abandoning the proposed route over Mather Pass in favor of the gentler Cartridge Pass to the southwest; indeed, the Cartridge Pass routing was listed as the official one (as well as the main one in Walter Starr’s first edition of the Guide to the John Muir Trail) until the construction of the Golden Staircase portion of the trail north of Mather Pass. The segment of the John Muir Trail which traverses Mather Pass was completed by the Forest Service during the summer of 1937, using three trail camps to construct 11.25 miles of trail at a cost of roughly $1,400 per mile in 1937 USD. It was the final segment of the trail to be built.

=== Modern day ===
In 2019, following a heavy snowpack in the Sierra Nevada, a 67-year-old man hiking alone died near Mather Pass after he slipped on ice and his head struck a rock.
