= Lyell Canyon =

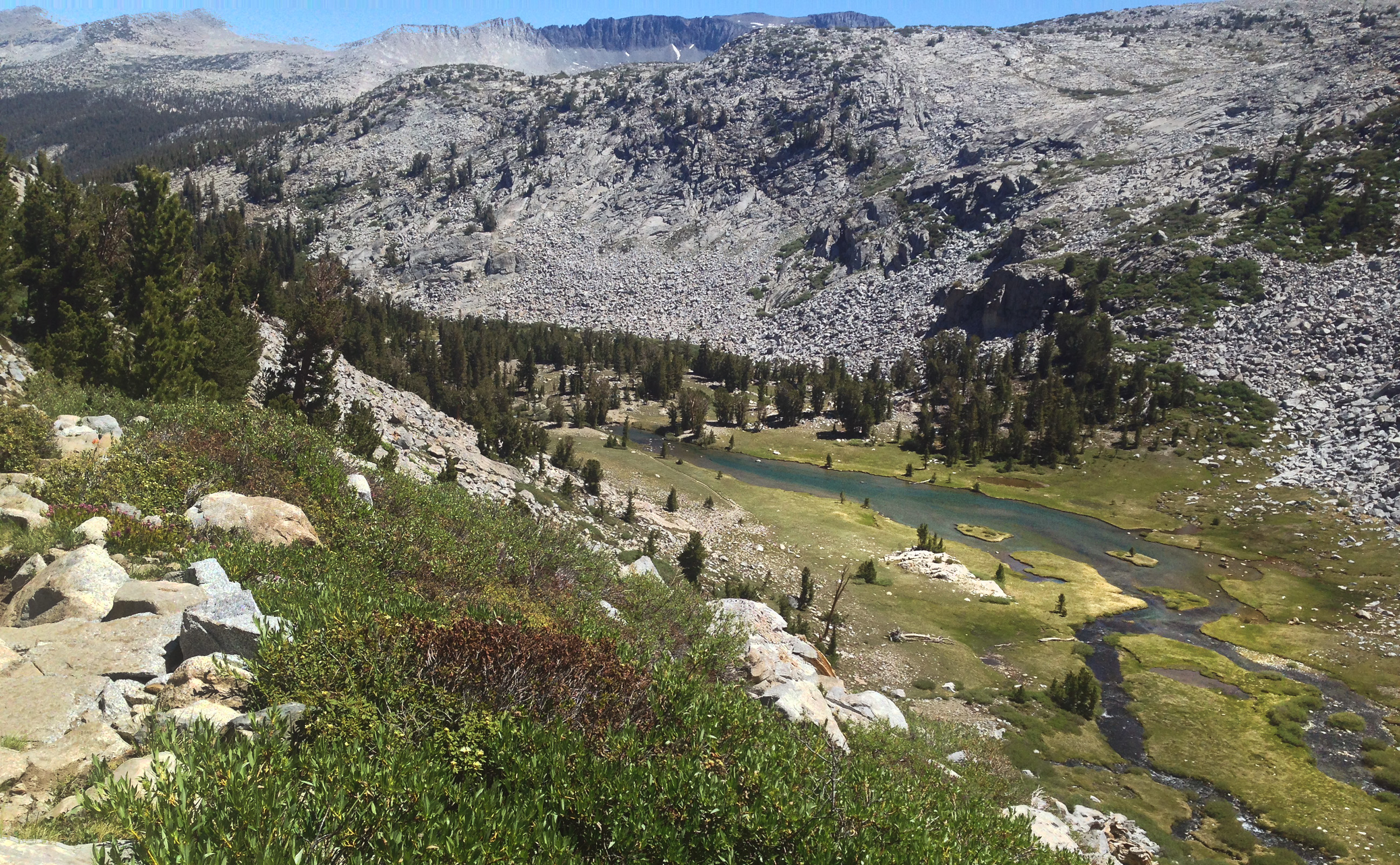
- Looking down into Lyell Canyon from the John Muir trail
- Floor elevation: 8,850 feet (2,700 m)
- Length: 8 miles (13 km)

Geography
- Coordinates: 37°51′50.736″N 119°18′6.55″W
- Interactive map of Lyell Canyon

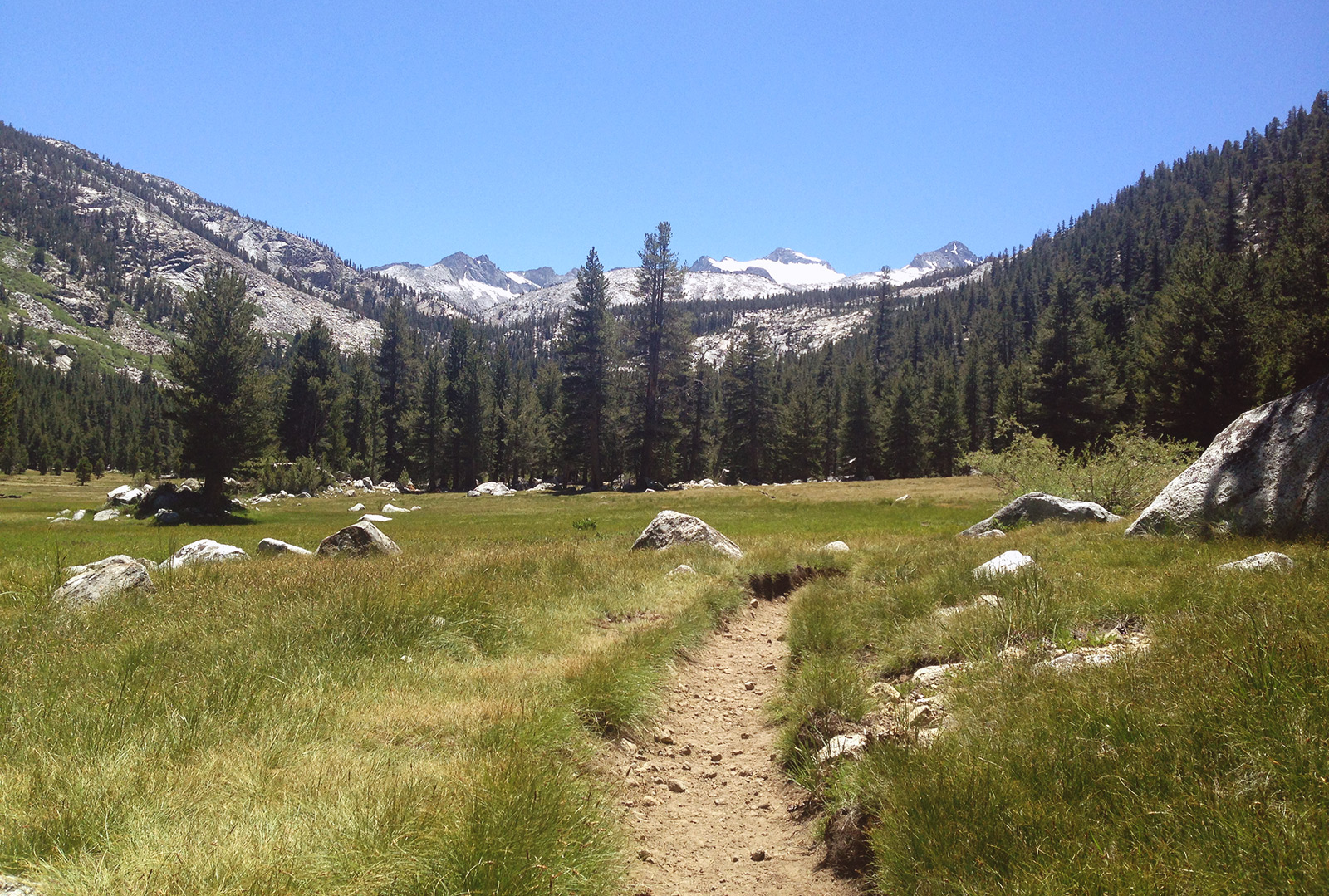
Lyell Canyon valley floor, on the John Muir trail. Donohue Peak in the background

Lyell Canyon is a sub-alpine meadow in Yosemite National Park south of Tuolumne Meadows. For 8 miles(13 kilometers) most of the canyon has an approximate elevation of 8,000 feet (2,400 meters), and then rapidly climbs to 10,826 feet (3,300 meters) to Donohue Pass, below Donohue Peak – which marks the eastern boundary of Yosemite. The valley at the base is relatively flat and wide, following the Lyell Fork of the Tuolumne River through an open meadow and wooded areas. The Lyell Fork eventually meets with Tuolumne River.

The canyon as well as Mount Lyell to the west is named after Charles Lyell, a well-known 19th century geologist and friend of Charles Darwin.

The canyon is an easy hike from Tuolumne Meadows campground. The John Muir Trail and the Pacific Crest Trail both route through the canyon. The trail is popular for hikers as an easy way to view surrounding mountains, a waterfall and Sierra wildflowers.

== See also ==
- Lyell Meadow
- Mount Lyell
