= Mount Lyell (California) =

Mountain Yosemite National Park, USA

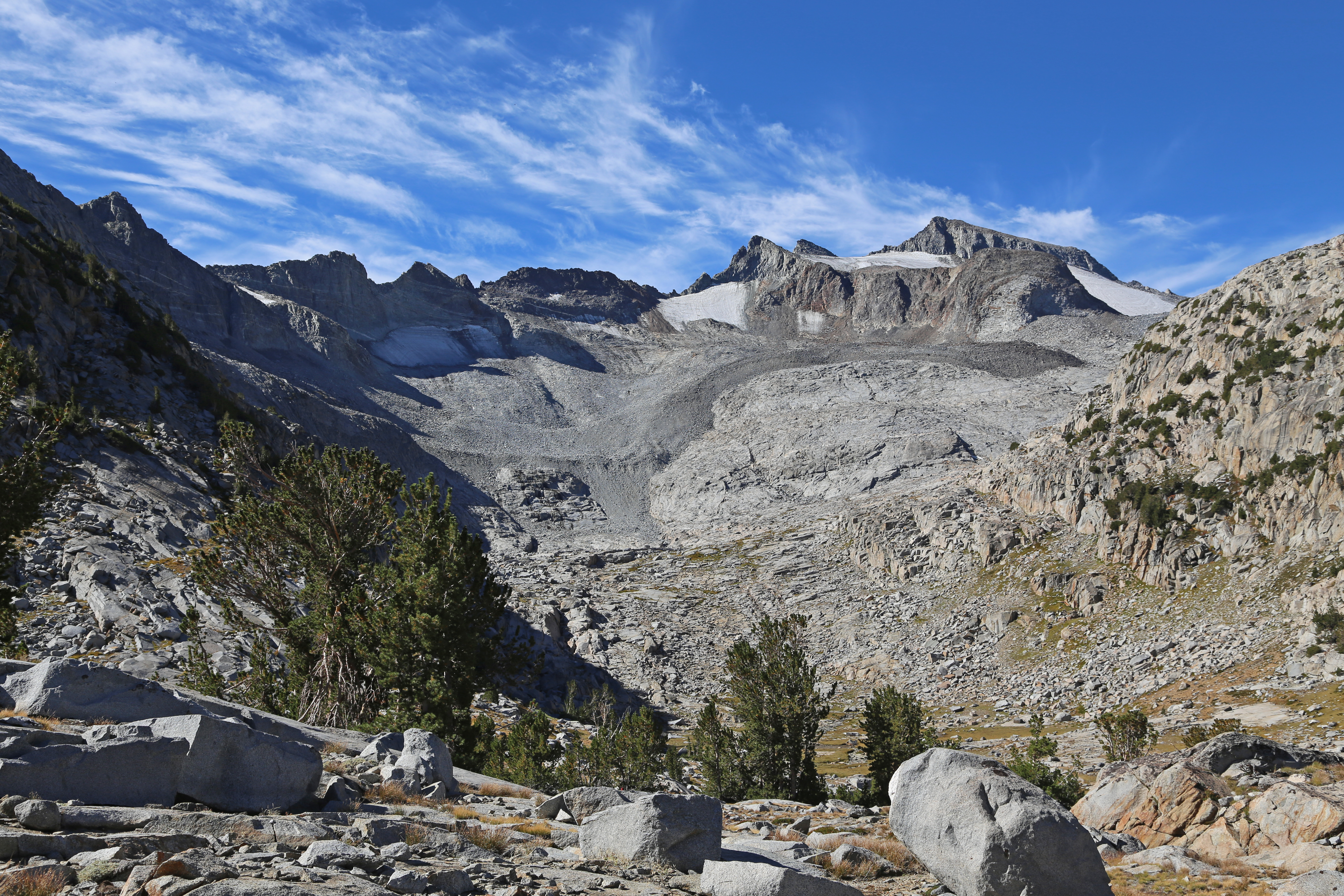
- Mount Lyell from Donahue shoulder

Highest point
- Elevation: 13,120 ft (3,999 m) NAVD 88
- Prominence: 1,927 ft (587 m)
- Parent peak: Mount Ritter
- Listing: U.S. National Park High Point 10th; California county high points 7th; California highest major peaks 17th; SPS Emblem peak; Western States Climbers peak
- Coordinates: 37°44′22″N 119°16′18″W

Geography
- Location within California Location within the United States
- Location: Madera and Tuolumne counties, California, U.S.
- Parent range: Cathedral Range, Sierra Nevada
- Topo map: USGS Mount Lyell

Climbing
- First ascent: August 29, 1871 by John Boies Tileston
- Easiest route: Exposed scramble, class 3

Mount Lyell is the highest point in Yosemite National Park, at 13,114 feet (3,997 m). It is located at the southeast end of the Cathedral Range, 1 1/4 miles (2 kilometers) northwest of Rodgers Peak. The peak as well as nearby Lyell Canyon is named after Charles Lyell, a well-known 19th century geologist. The peak had one of the last remaining glaciers in Yosemite, Lyell Glacier. The Lyell Glacier is currently considered to be a permanent ice field, not a living glacier. Mount Lyell divides the Tuolumne River watershed to the north, the Merced to the west, and the Rush Creek drainage in the Mono Lake Basin to the southeast.

== Climbing ==
The most common approach to Mount Lyell is from Tuolumne Meadows on a highly traveled section of the John Muir Trail. The round trip is approximately 25 miles (40 km) and involves 4,500 feet (1,370 m) of elevation gain when starting from the Tuolumne Wilderness Office. The hike is easy from Tuolumne Meadows, following the Tuolumne River to the head of the Lyell Canyon, and becomes moderate as it approaches Donohue Pass. Before reaching Donohue Pass, the route leaves the trail and heads south towards Mount Lyell.

Most summit ascents are done either over or around the Lyell Glacier. Seasonal and year-to-year variations on the glacier make it necessary to assess current conditions before choosing a route to the summit. The northwest Ridge, from the saddle between Mount Lyell and nearby Mount Maclure, offers class 2 to 3 climbing with high snow levels on the glacier. Low snow levels increases the grade to class 3 to 4 on the exposed granite ledges, in which cases it may be easier to ascend the glacier more directly to the summit.

The summit block of Mount Lyell is composed of dark volcanic granite, similar to its neighbors to the southeast, Rodgers Peak, Mount Davis, Banner Peak, and Mount Ritter. This rock is very loose and unstable for climbing, making the ascent to the summit plateau dangerous when the glacier is low, exposing the lower reaches of the summit block. For this reason, some climbers consider Mount Lyell and nearby Mount Maclure to actually be geologically part of the Ritter Range.

The grade of the East Arete likewise increases with low snow conditions, going from class 3 to class 4 (the looseness of the rock underlying the glacier on the East Arete makes it somewhat dangerous in low snow conditions). Other routes exist on the south and west sides, but of greater difficulty and longer approaches.

== Climate ==
Climate data for Mount Lyell 37.7418 N, 119.2731 W, Elevation: 12,362 ft (3,768 m) (1991–2020 normals)
Month	Jan	Feb	Mar	Apr	May	Jun	Jul	Aug	Sep	Oct	Nov	Dec	Year
Mean daily maximum °F (°C)	29.3 (−1.5)	28.2 (−2.1)	31.1 (−0.5)	34.0 (1.1)	41.4 (5.2)	50.9 (10.5)	58.6 (14.8)	58.0 (14.4)	52.6 (11.4)	44.0 (6.7)	35.6 (2.0)	29.2 (−1.6)	41.1 (5.0)
Daily mean °F (°C)	19.1 (−7.2)	17.5 (−8.1)	19.9 (−6.7)	22.6 (−5.2)	29.8 (−1.2)	39.1 (3.9)	46.7 (8.2)	46.0 (7.8)	40.4 (4.7)	32.6 (0.3)	25.0 (−3.9)	19.1 (−7.2)	29.8 (−1.2)
Mean daily minimum °F (°C)	9.0 (−12.8)	6.7 (−14.1)	8.7 (−12.9)	11.2 (−11.6)	18.3 (−7.6)	27.3 (−2.6)	34.8 (1.6)	34.0 (1.1)	28.2 (−2.1)	21.1 (−6.1)	14.4 (−9.8)	9.0 (−12.8)	18.6 (−7.5)
Average precipitation inches (mm)	11.01 (280)	9.01 (229)	8.75 (222)	4.72 (120)	2.64 (67)	0.87 (22)	0.65 (17)	0.42 (11)	0.74 (19)	2.65 (67)	4.06 (103)	9.62 (244)	55.14 (1,401)
Source: PRISM Climate Group

== See also ==
- List of highest points in California by county
- Lyell Canyon
- Lyell Meadow
- Mount Lyell shrew
