= Forester Pass =

Mountain pass in the Sierra Nevada, California

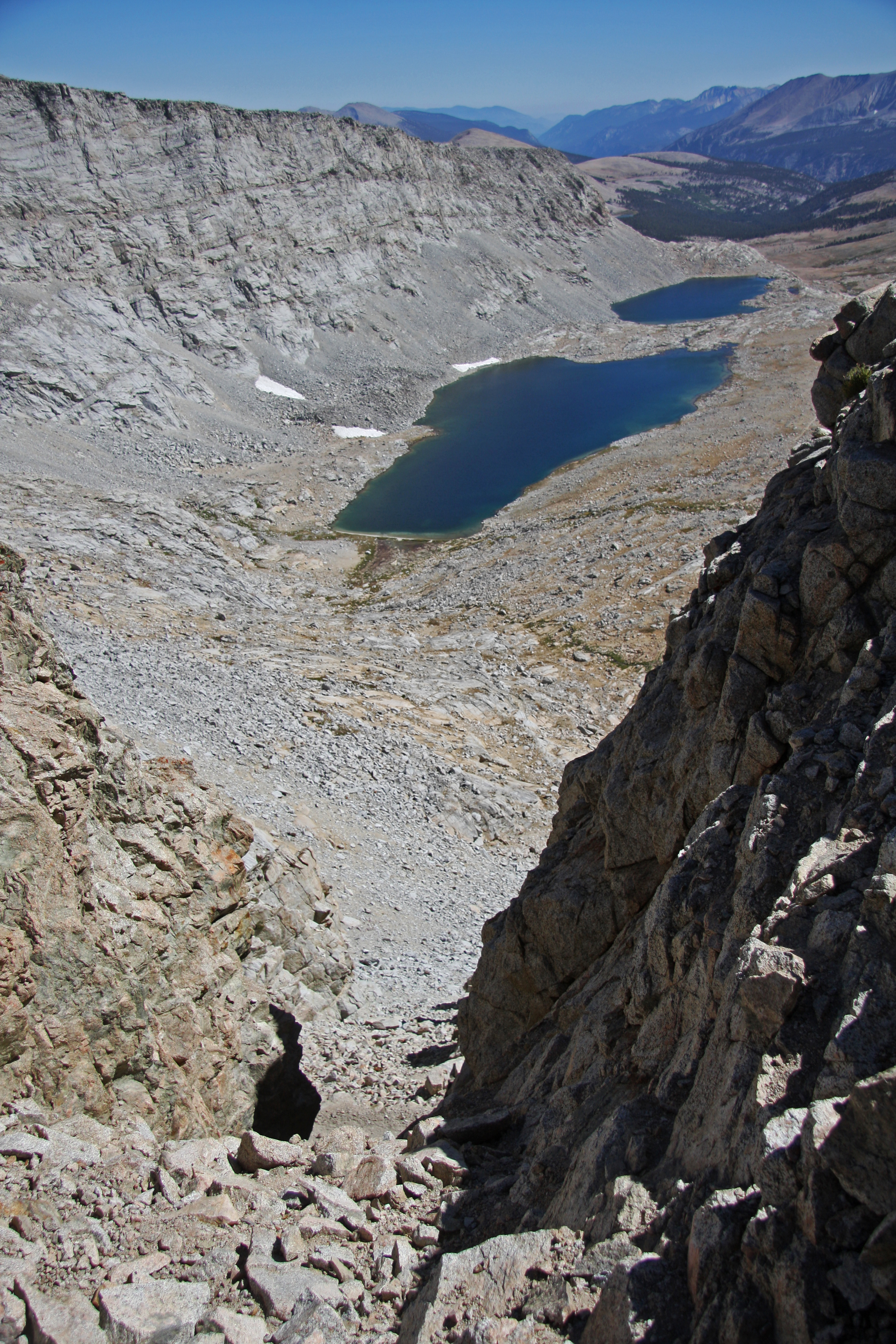
- The view south from Forester Pass

- Location within California
- Elevation: 13,153 feet (4,009 m)
- Traversed by: John Muir Trail, Pacific Crest Trail

Third Approach
- Location: Tulare County, California, United States
- Range: Sierra Nevada
- Coordinates: 36°41′39″N 118°22′19″W
- Topo map: USGS Mount Williamson

Forester Pass is a mountain pass in the Sierra Nevada. Located on the Kings-Kern Divide and on the boundary between Sequoia National Park and Kings Canyon National Park, Forester Pass connects the drainages of Bubbs Creek (a tributary of the South Fork Kings River) and the Kern River. The pass is traversed by the John Muir Trail and the Pacific Crest Trail, which are coincident between Crabtree Meadows and Tuolumne Meadows. At 13,153 feet (4,009 m), Forester Pass is the highest point along the Pacific Crest Trail. It is also the southernmost of the six high mountain passes above 11,000 feet along the John Muir Trail, with (in order from north to south) Donohue Pass, Muir Pass, Mather Pass, Pinchot Pass, and Glen Pass.

The PCT/JMT ascends the pass gradually from the north and switchbacks precipitously down its sheer southern side.

== History ==
Originally documented by a group of United States Forest Service workers, it was subsequently named in their honor. On August 26, 1930, four men—including 18-year-old Donald Downs—were injured during construction of the trail over the pass. A boulder let loose during blasting of the trail crushed Downs' arm. The men were evacuated by stretcher, Downs to Baxter Cabin and the others to Independence. Mr. Downs's arm was amputated. He died on September 2, 1930, from complications of surgery. A plane crashed at Tyndall Creek after dropping medicine for Downs. A plaque commemorating his death is found on the southern side of the pass, most easily seen while walking in a northerly direction.

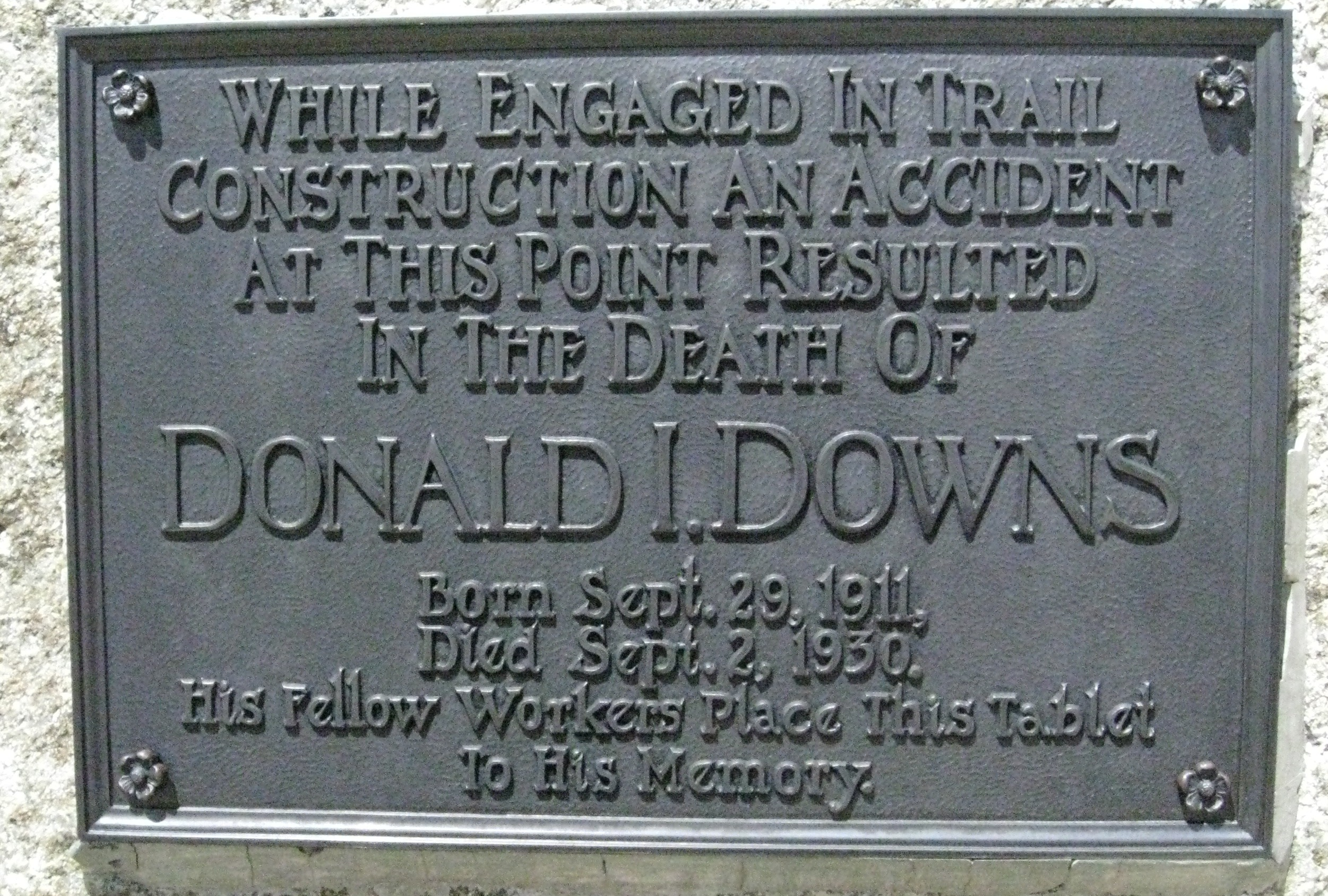
Memorial plaque to Donald Downs
