= Pointless Peak =

Mountain in the state of California

- Mono Mesa
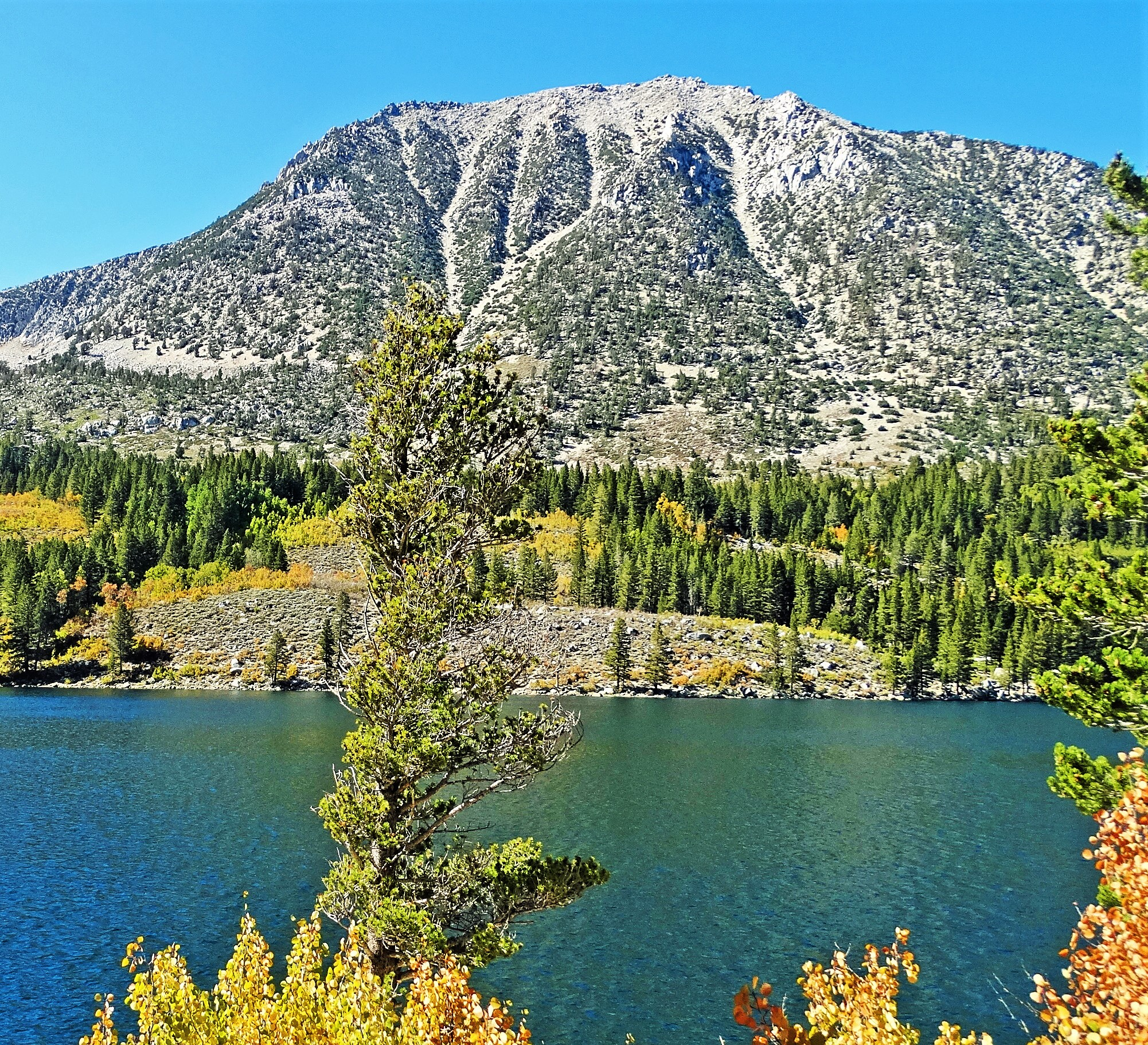
- Southeast aspect, from Rock Creek Lake

Highest point
- Elevation: 12,256 ft (3,736 m)
- Prominence: 376 ft (115 m)
- Parent peak: Mount Huntington (12,355 ft)
- Isolation: 1.38 mi (2.22 km)
- Coordinates: 37°27′40″N 118°45′16″W

Geography
- Location within California Location within the United States
- Location: Inyo County, California U.S.
- Parent range: Sierra Nevada
- Topo map: USGS Mount Abbot

Climbing
- Easiest route: class 2

Pointless Peak, elevation 12,256 feet (3,736 m), is a mountain summit located in Inyo County of northern California, United States. Set one-half mile east of the crest of the Sierra Nevada mountain range, the peak is situated in the John Muir Wilderness on land managed by Inyo National Forest. It rises at the northern end of Little Lakes Valley, and is immediately west of Rock Creek Lake. Topographic relief is significant as the summit rises 2,550 feet (780 meters) above this lake in approximately one mile (1.6 km). Neighbors include Mount Starr, 2.5 miles to the south, and line parent Mount Huntington, 1.4 mile to the northwest. This landform is also known as "Mono Mesa", but neither name is official and it will remain unofficial so long as the USGS policy of not adopting new toponyms in designated wilderness areas remains in effect.

== Climate ==
According to the Köppen climate classification system, Pointless Peak is located in an alpine climate zone. Most weather fronts originate in the Pacific Ocean, and travel east toward the Sierra Nevada mountains. As fronts approach, they are forced upward by the peaks (orographic lift), causing them to drop their moisture in the form of rain or snowfall onto the range. Precipitation runoff from the north slope of this mountain drains into Hilton Creek, and from the east side into Rock Creek.

== Gallery ==
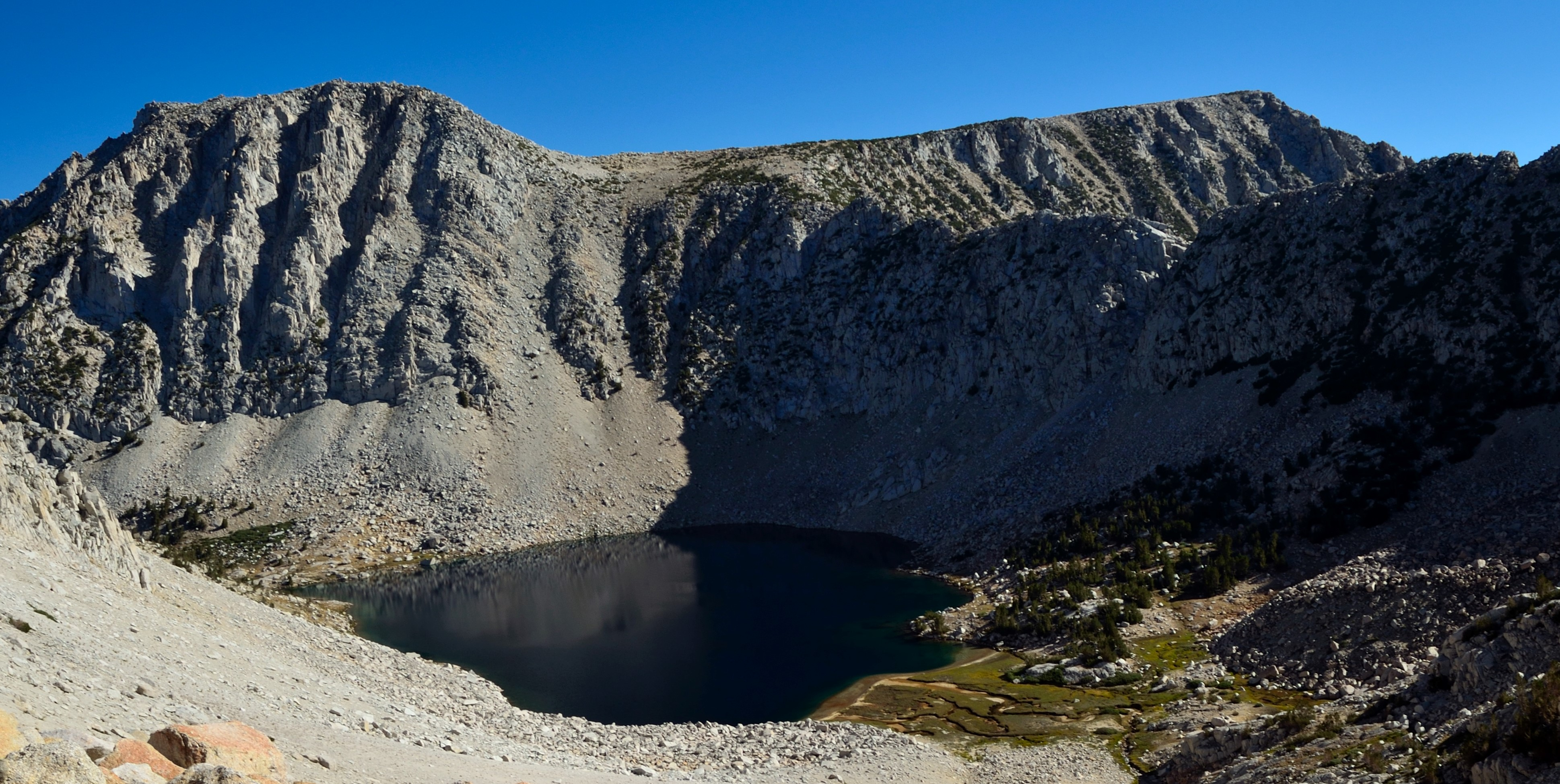
Golden Lake and Pointless Peak (upper right).
Camera pointed north.

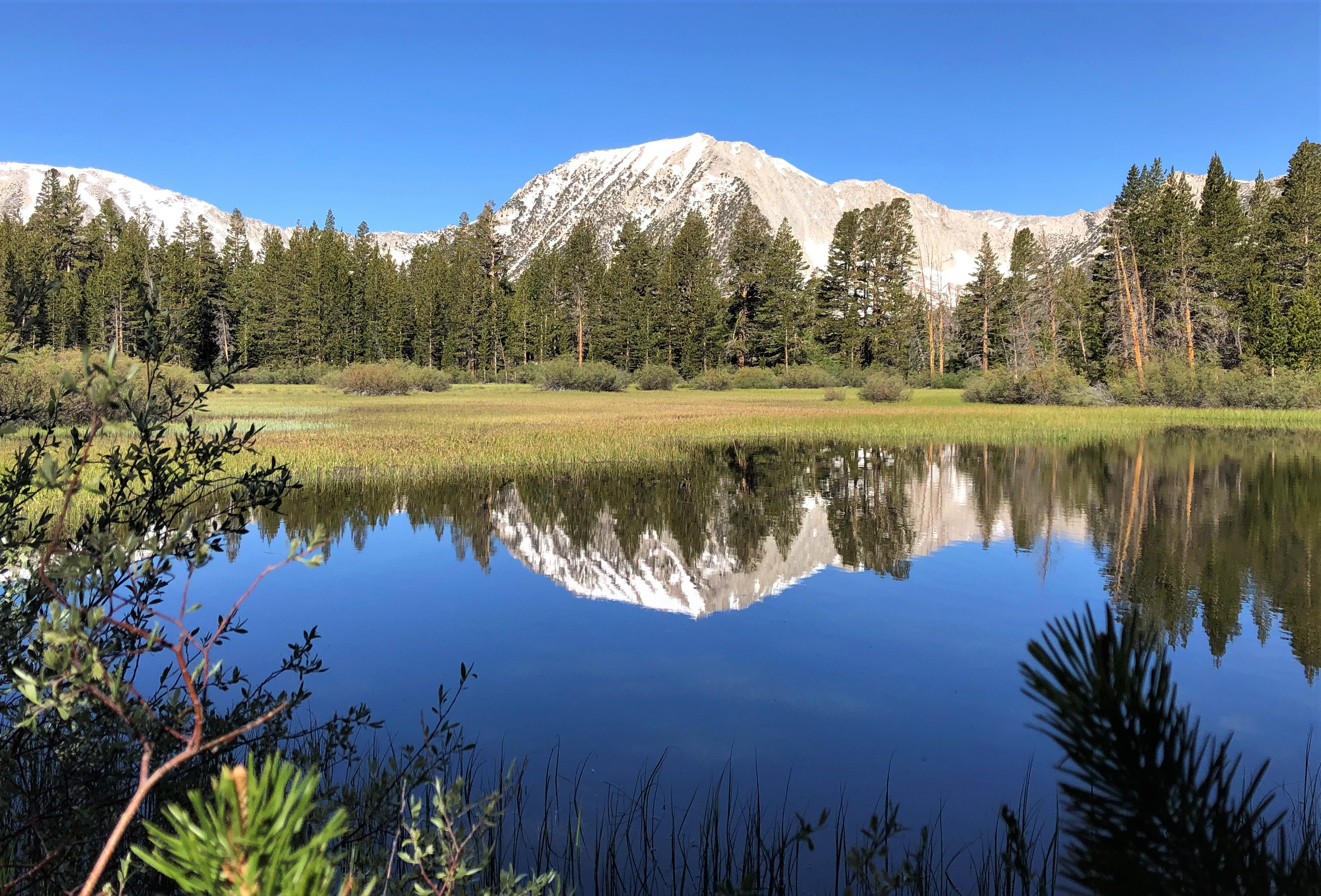
Pointless Peak

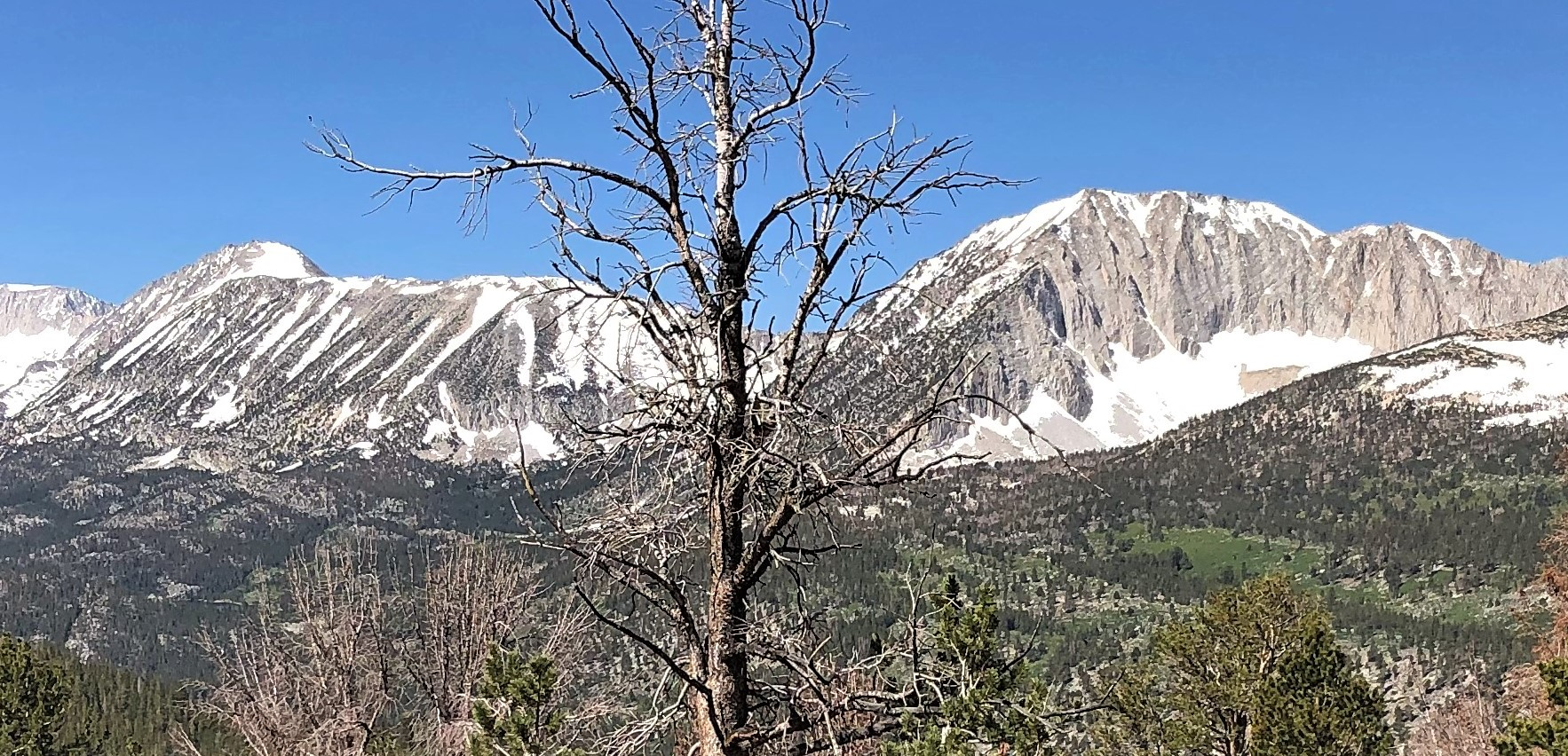
Mount Starr (left) and Pointless Peak (right)

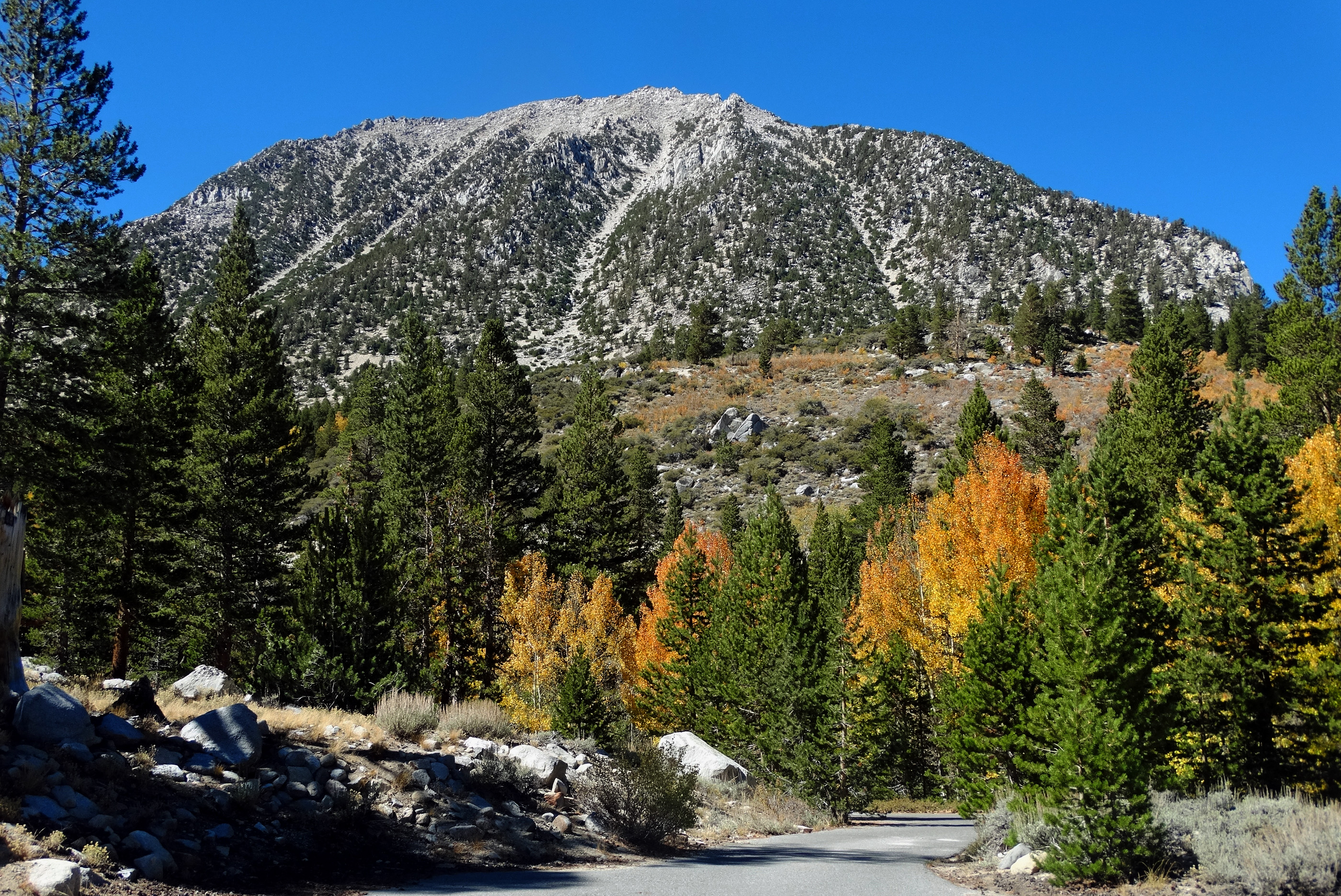

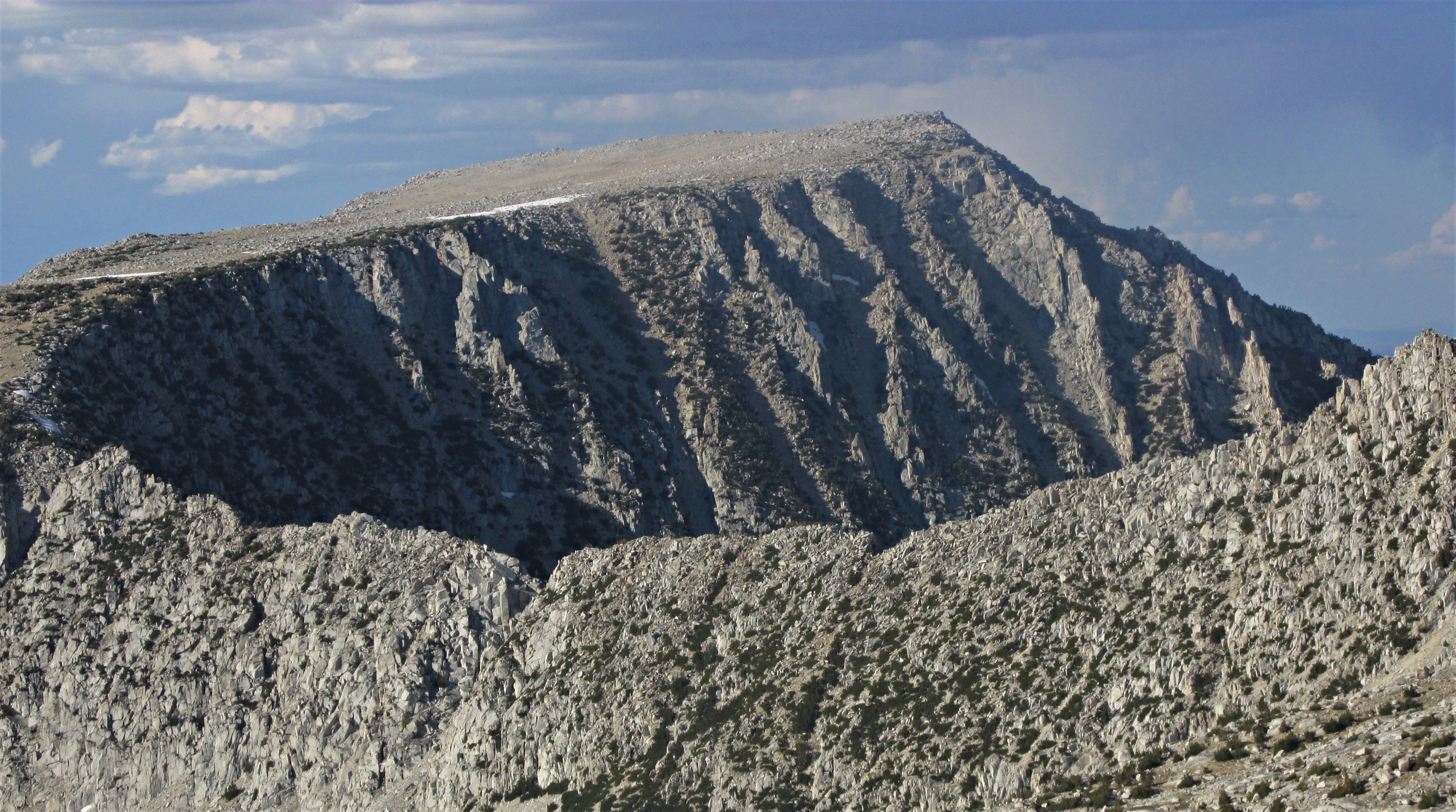
South aspect

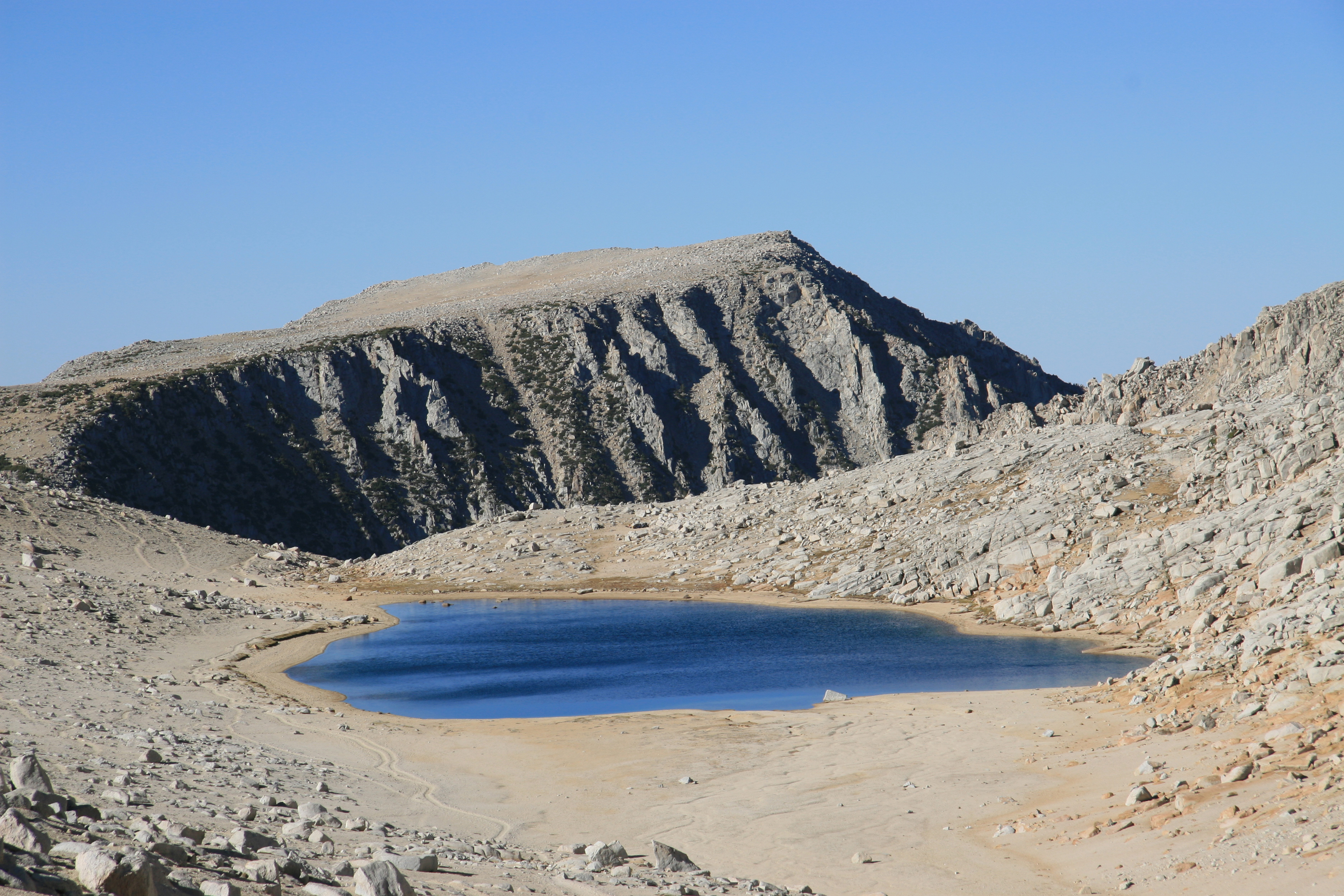
Summit Lake and Pointless Peak.
Camera pointed north.
