= John Muir Trail =

Long-distance trail in the Sierra Nevada mountains of California, US

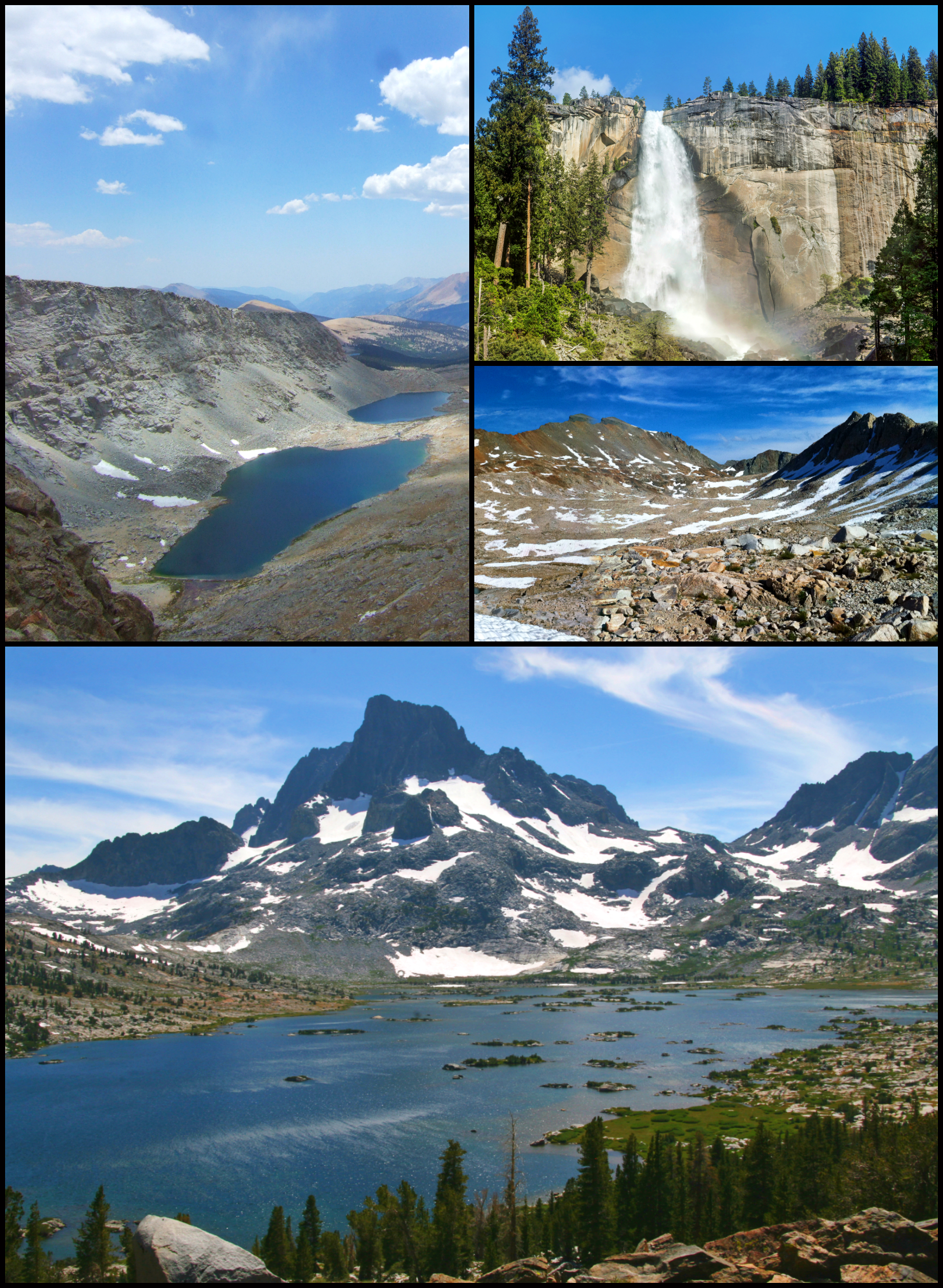
- Length: 211 mi (340 km)
- Location: California, United States
- Trailheads: Happy Isles trailhead, Yosemite Valley; Summit of Mount Whitney
- Use: backpacking, hiking, trail running, trail riding, pack trains
- Elevation change: 47,000 ft (14,000 m)
- Highest point: Mount Whitney, 14,505 ft (4,421 m)
- Lowest point: Happy Isles trailhead, Yosemite Valley, 4,035 ft (1,230 m)
- Difficulty: Moderate to strenuous
- Months: July to September
- Sights: Yosemite Valley, Devils Postpile National Monument, Sierra Nevada
- Hazards: Snowmelt, icy slopes early season, altitude

The John Muir Trail (JMT) is a long-distance trail in the Sierra Nevada mountain range of California, passing through Yosemite, Kings Canyon and Sequoia National Parks. It is named after John Muir, a naturalist.

From the northern terminus at Happy Isles in Yosemite Valley (37.7317°N 119.5587°W) and the southern terminus located on the summit of Mount Whitney (36.5785°N 118.292°W), the trail's length is 213.7 miles (343.9 km), with a total elevation gain of approximately 47,000 feet (14,000 m). For almost all of its length, the trail is in the High Sierra backcountry and wilderness areas. (Note: The trail passes near a road only at the northern terminus, in Tuolumne Meadows in Yosemite National Park (see Winnett 1970, pp. 39–43) and at Red's Meadow near Devils Postpile National Monument) For about 160 miles (260 km), the trail is coincident with the longer Pacific Crest Trail.

The vast majority of the trail is within designated wilderness. The trail passes through large swaths of alpine and high mountain scenery, and lies almost entirely at or above 8,000 feet (2,400 m) in elevation. The trail sees about 1,500 thru-hiking attempts each year (including Pacific Crest Trail thru-hikers), many fewer than the number of attempts on comparable walks such as the southern portion of Appalachian Trail or the Way of St. James. (Note: According to the PCTA, roughly 1500-2000 people attempt to thru-hike the PCT each year. An estimate shows that an equal number of JMT only hikers attempt the trail as well.)

== History ==
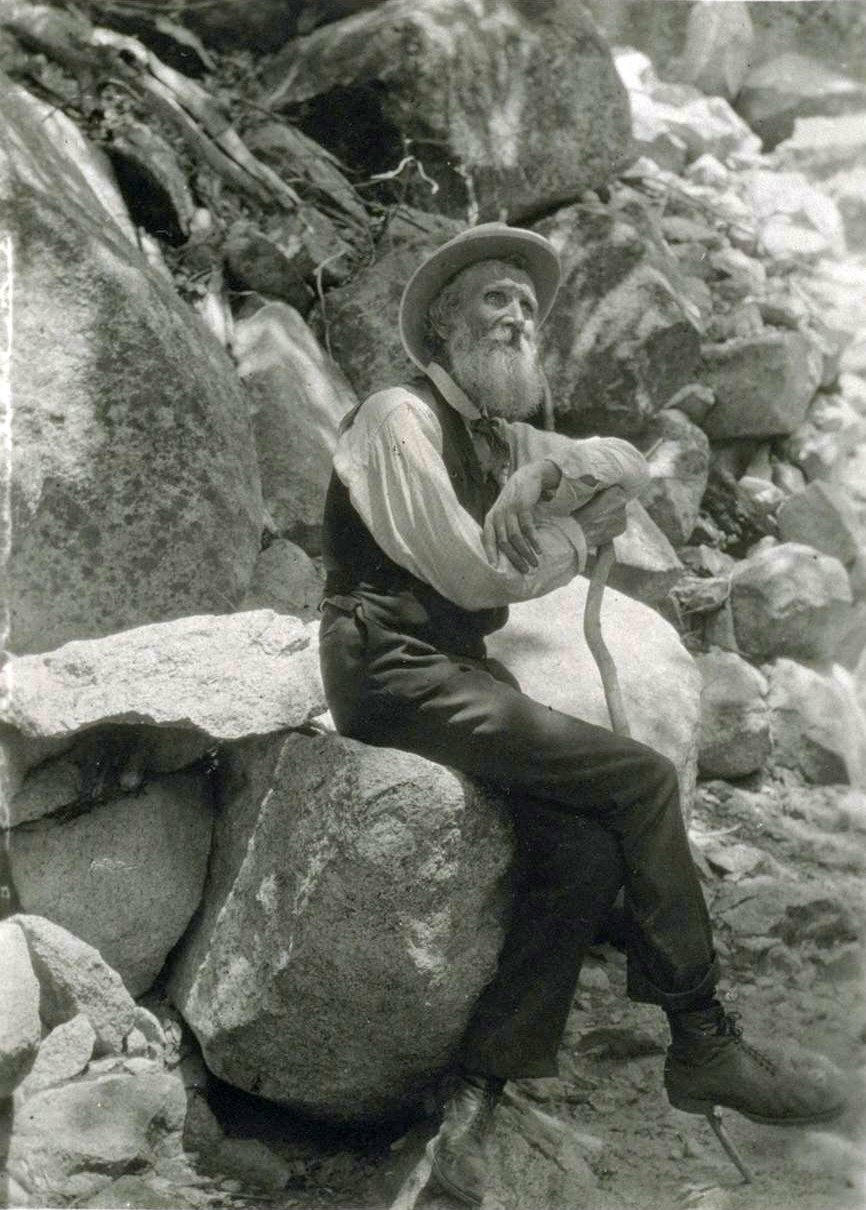
The trail is named in honor of Scottish-American environmentalist John Muir

=== Paiute trade routes ===
Prior to the arrival of European-American settlers, the Paiute people living in the High Sierra region utilized a series of ancestral trails for hunting and trade with neighboring indigenous groups. In an effort to acknowledge the original people who traveled this region, some modern Native American and environmental organizations recognize the JMT as Nüümü Poyo, which translates to "Paiute Road," "Paiute Trail," or "People's Trail."

=== Proposal ===
The idea of a trail along the backbone of the High Sierra originated with Theodore Solomons. Solomons later recalled that the concept originated in his adolescence. "The idea of a crest-parallel trail came to me one day while herding my uncle's cattle in an immense unfenced alfalfa field near Fresno. It was 1884 and I was 14." He began advocating construction of the trail shortly after the Sierra Club was founded in 1892. John Muir was a founding member and first president of the Sierra Club. Solomons explored the area now known as the Evolution Basin, and traveled extensively throughout the High Sierra, exploring possible trail routes. Joseph Nisbet LeConte took up the cause in 1898 and the proposed trail was originally called the "High Sierra Trail", although that name was later given to a different trail, running in the east–west direction. LeConte spent years exploring the canyons and passes of the Kings River and Kern River, and climbing peaks along the proposed trail. Along with James S. Hutchinson and Duncan McDuffie, he pioneered a high mountain route in 1908 from Yosemite National Park to Kings Canyon, roughly along the route of the modern JMT. In 28 days, they completed a trip of 228 miles through the high mountains, including several previously unexplored sections. In 1914, the Sierra Club appointed a committee to cooperate with the State of California to begin construction of the trail. John Muir died later that year, and the proposed trail was renamed in his honor.

=== Trail construction ===
Construction of the JMT began in 1915, a year after Muir's death, with a $10,000 appropriation from the California legislature and Governor Hiram Johnson. State Engineer Wilbur F. McClure was made responsible for overseeing the project and selecting the final route, though he secured the cooperation of the United States Forest Service, which managed and supervised much of the actual construction, and LeConte was very influential regarding the eventual routing of the trail. The California state legislature made additional appropriations of $10,000 each in 1917, 1925, 1927 and 1929.

After the Depression began, assistance from the California state government came to an end, so the remainder of the trail had to be funded by a joint effort between the Forest Service and the National Park Service. At this time, there were still two difficult sections yet to be completed. The first section, the connection from the Kings River to the Kern River over Forester Pass, at an elevation of 13,153 feet (4,009 m), was completed in 1932. The task of constructing trail down the steep southern side of the pass required crews to blast sections out of the rock, a dangerous process that resulted in the death of trail crew member Donald I. Downs in 1930. A plaque near the base of the pass memorializes Downs today.

The Forest Service completed the final section at Palisade Creek (in the Palisade Group) in 1938. This section passes by the headwaters of the Middle Fork of the Kings River and over Mather Pass by the "Golden Staircase" to the headwaters of the South Fork of the Kings River. Shortly after, this section was incorporated into newly created Kings Canyon National Park. The entire project had taken 46 years to complete. William Edward Colby, the first secretary of the Sierra Club, called the finished trail "a most appropriate memorial to John Muir, who spent many of the best years of his life exploring the region which it will make accessible."

The California Wilderness Act of 1984 merged the John Muir Wilderness and the Ansel Adams Wilderness to maintain the continuous 250-mile stretch of the John Muir Trail from Yosemite to south of Mount Whitney.

== Route ==
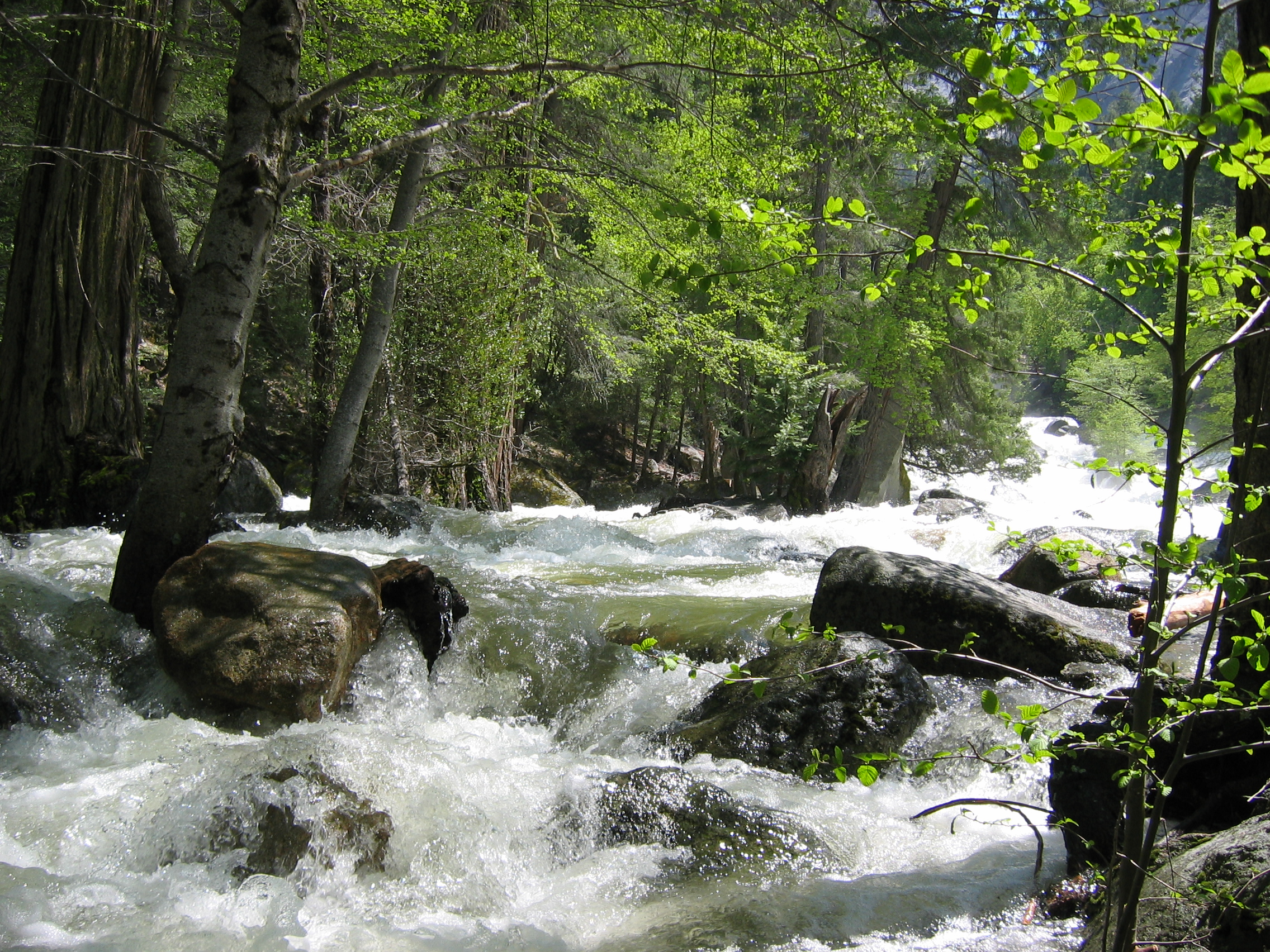
Happy Isles on the Merced River in Yosemite Valley is the northern terminus of the John Muir Trail

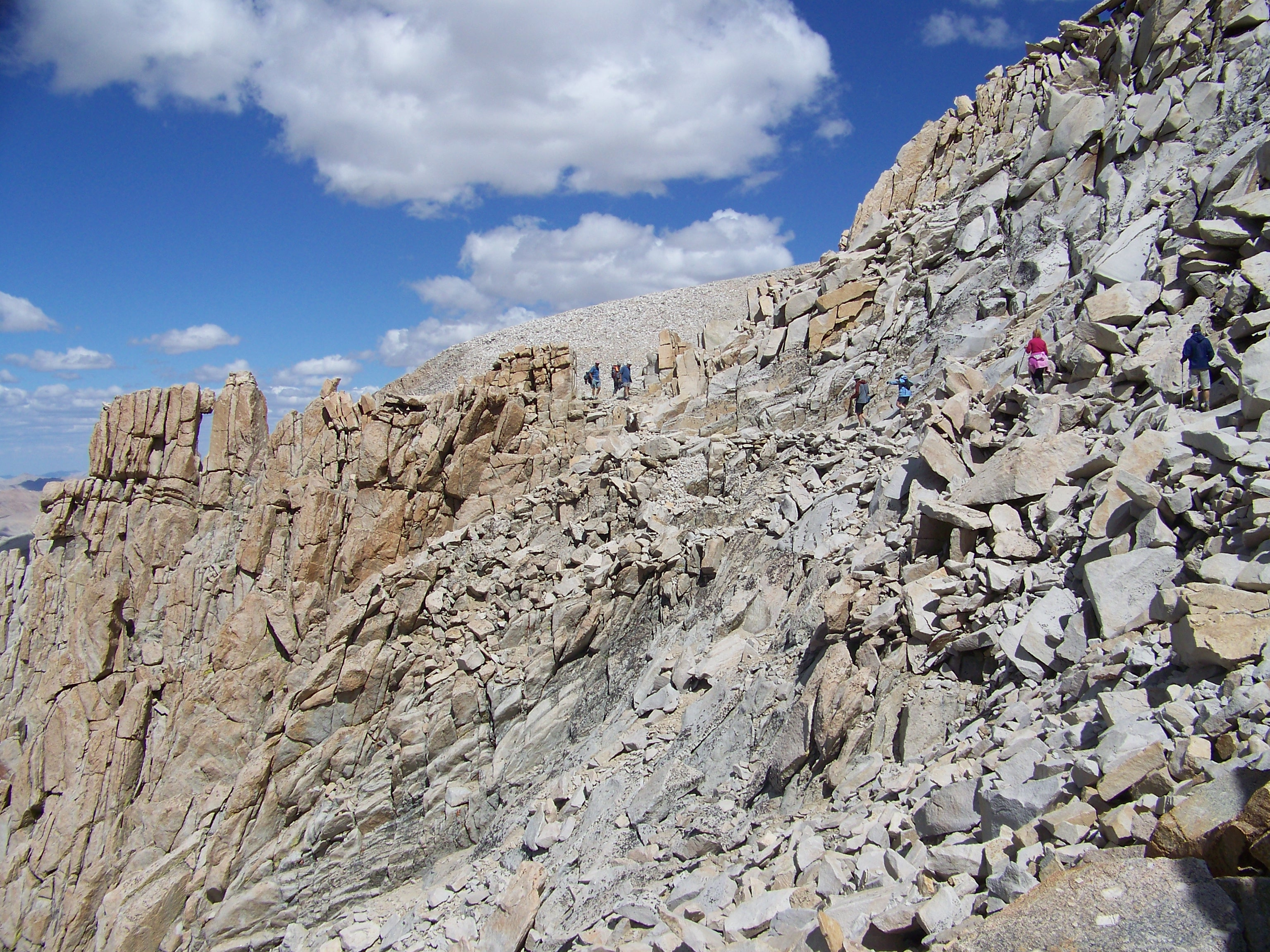
Hikers approach the southern end of the John Muir Trail. The Mount Whitney summit plateau can be seen in the distance.

The JMT is 213.7 miles (343.9 km) long. From its northern terminus in Yosemite Valley, the trail runs northeast, passing south of Half Dome and then on to Tuolumne Meadows. From Tuolumne Meadows the trail turns south, running parallel to the main range of the Sierra Nevada, through Yosemite National Park, Inyo and Sierra national forests (including the John Muir Wilderness and Ansel Adams Wilderness), passing through Devils Postpile National Monument, Kings Canyon National Park, and ending on Mount Whitney in Sequoia National Park. From the southern terminus of the JMT at the summit of Mount Whitney, an additional 10.6-mile (17.1 km) hike on the Mount Whitney Trail is required to reach the nearest trailhead at Whitney Portal, thus making an end-to-end traverse of the JMT effectively 221 miles (356 km).

=== Yosemite National Park ===
The trail begins at the Happy Isle bridge near the Happy Isles Nature Center. The trail ascends steeply up a paved incline before crossing another bridge meeting with the junction with the Mist Trail. The trail continues along a cut into Panorama Cliff, called the "Ice Cut". Although broad and well-traveled, hazardous winter conditions and close proximity to civilization (attracting large numbers of day hikers) make this one of the most dangerous parts of the trail.

After some elevation gain via long switchbacks, the trail reaches the top of Nevada Falls. The trail continues into Little Yosemite Valley, past the trail junctions to Half Dome and Cloud's Rest, and then into a subalpine basin and passing the Sunrise High Sierra Camp. The trail then crosses the Cathedral Range at Cathedral Pass before dropping steeply into Tuolumne Meadows, a common resupply point. The trail passes a visitor center and some campgrounds before linking up with the Pacific Crest Trail. The John Muir Trail/Pacific Crest Trail then turns south, through the mild Lyell Canyon meadow, and crosses the Cathedral Range again and exits the park at Donahue Pass.

=== Ansel Adams Wilderness and Devils Postpile National Monument ===
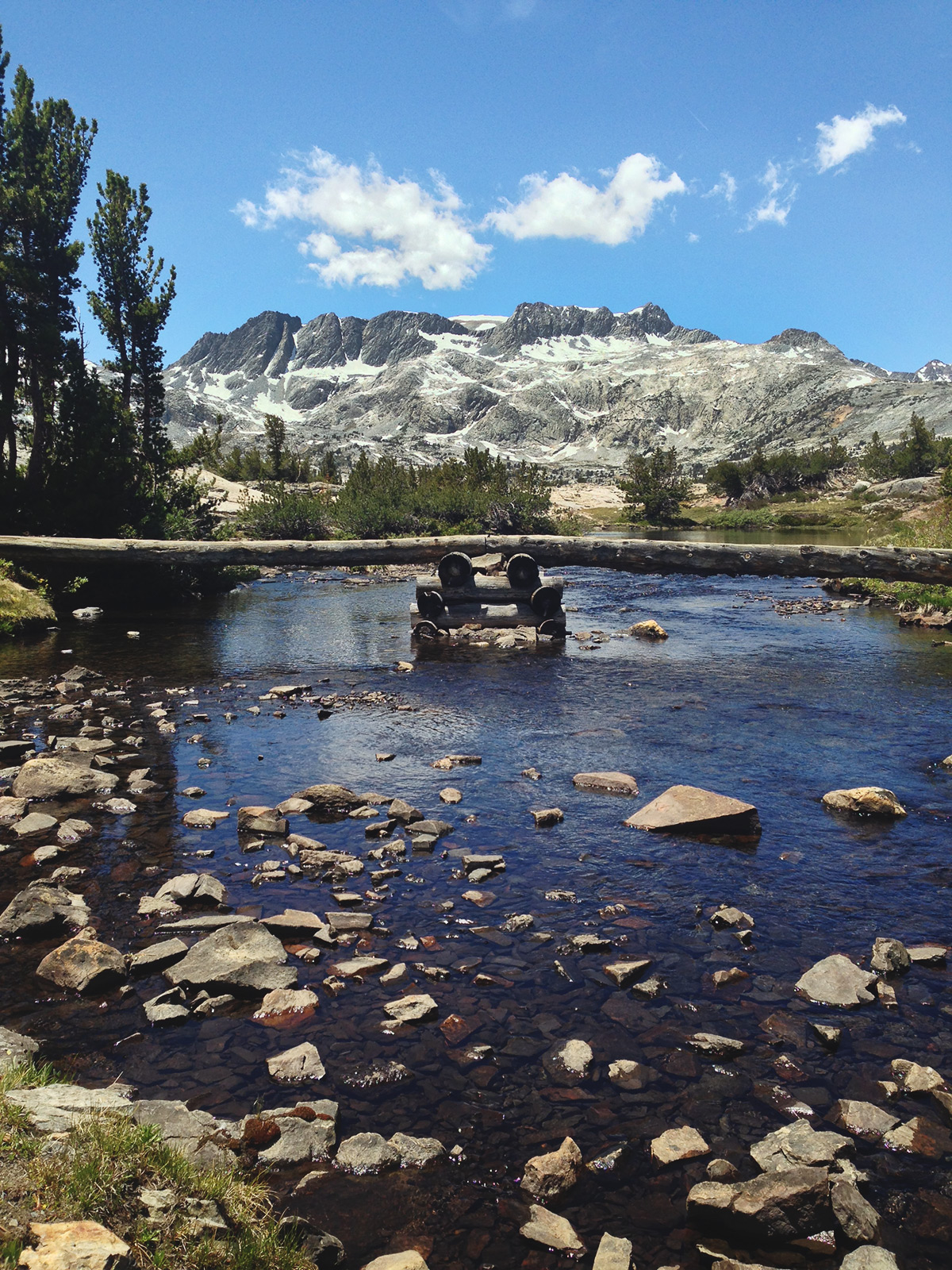
A log bridge crossing part of Thousand Island Lake; Mount Davis in the background

At the crest of Donahue Pass, the trail enters Inyo National Forest and the Ansel Adams Wilderness. The trail passes Thousand Island Lake, Garnet Lake, and a number of smaller lakes. The trail continues into Devils Postpile National Monument, where there are a number of opportunities to resupply or exit the trail. Devil's Postpile is located a short distance from the trail.

=== Kings Canyon National Park and Sequoia National Park ===
The John Muir Trail next enters Kings Canyon National Park and Sequoia National Park crossing some spectacular alpine regions, including Evolution Basin, the Golden Staircase, and Forester Pass. The trail ends at the summit of Mount Whitney, the highest point in the contiguous United States. From the summit of Mount Whitney, the closest trailhead is Whitney Portal.

== Elevation ==
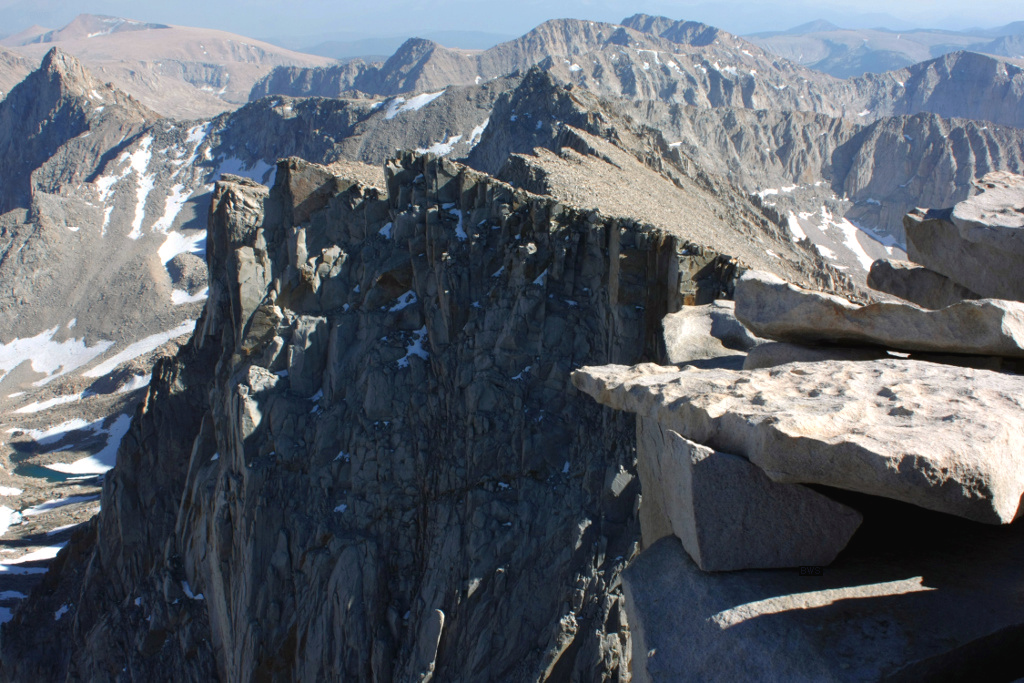
View from the summit of Mount Whitney, at the trail's highest elevation

The lowest point on the trail is the northern terminus at Happy Isles in Yosemite Valley, at 4,040 feet (1,230 m). The highest point on the trail is the southern terminus, Mount Whitney, at 14,505 feet (4,421 m), which is also the highest point in the contiguous United States. The trail stays at high elevations, mostly above 8,000 feet (2,400 m) and with the exception of the first 7 miles directly south of the trail's northern terminus, it never drops below 7,000 feet (2,100 m). A large portion of the trail is more than 10,000 feet (3,000 m) high, including the entirety of the last 30 miles (48 km). The trail crosses six mountain passes over 11,000 feet (3,400 m); from north to south, Donohue Pass, Muir Pass, Mather Pass, Pinchot Pass, Glen Pass, and Forester Pass. At 13,117 feet (3,998 m), Forester Pass is also the highest point along the Pacific Crest Trail.

When the United States Geological Survey calculated the official length of the trail, elevation gain and loss was not taken into consideration. The total amount of ascent of the trail is around 46,000 feet (14,000 m). According to Hipcamp and the John Muir Trail Foundation, the total descent of the trail is 38,000 feet (12,000 m); however, Backpacker estimates the total descent as 2,000 feet less, at 36,000 feet (11,000 m). This produces a total of about 84,000 feet (26,000 m), or almost 16 miles (26 km); however, this does not mean the total length is increased by 16 miles (26 km). Rather, the triangle inequality implies that the error due to neglecting elevation changes underestimates the true length by no greater than this value.

According to Backpacker magazine, in total, the trail gains 47,000 feet (14,000 m) in elevation.

== Hiking ==
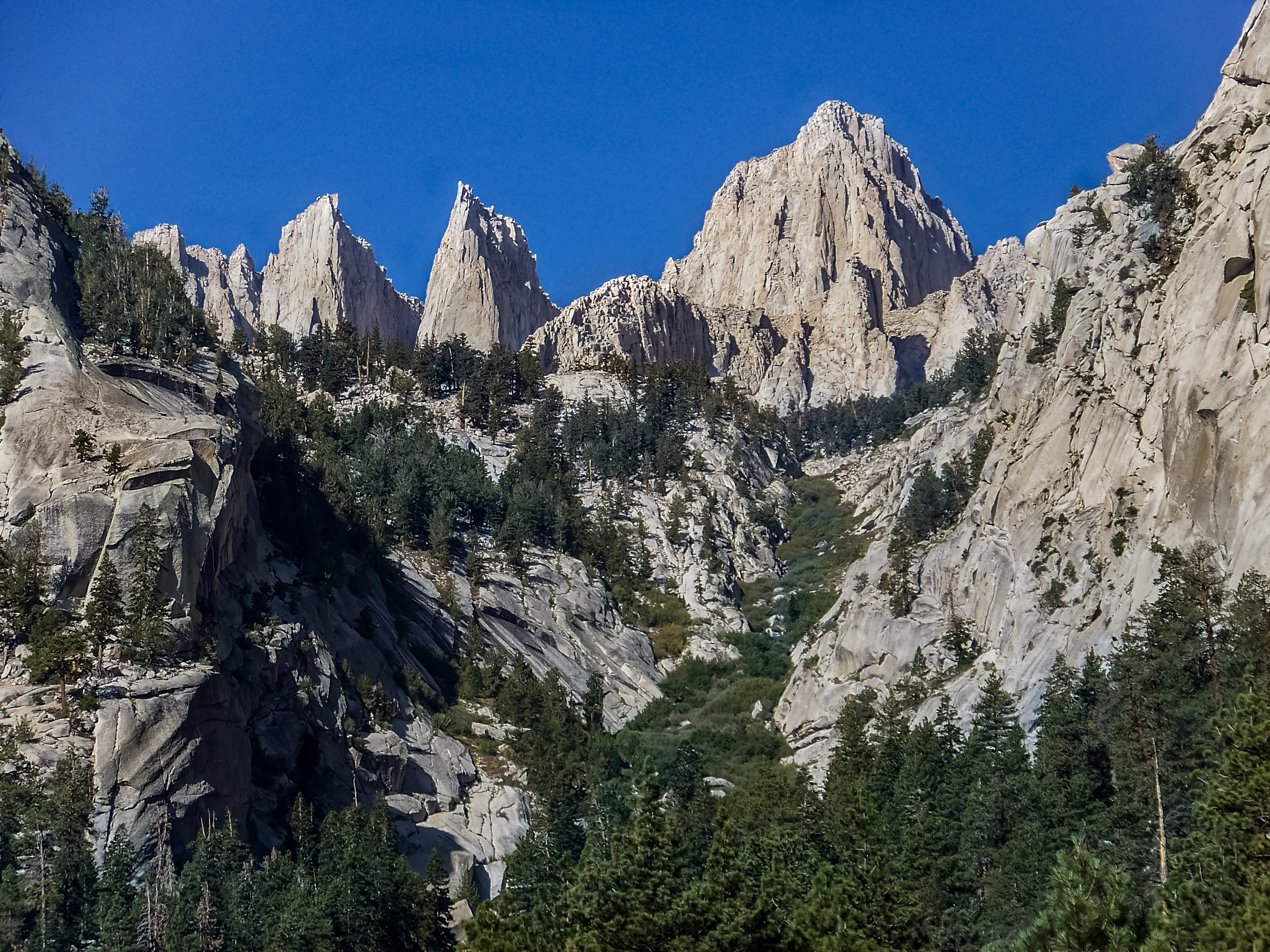
The summit of Mount Whitney is the southern terminus of the John Muir Trail. This photo was taken near the Whitney Portal trailhead.

The primary hiking season is usually from July through September; during this time, most of the snow from the previous year has melted, but new snow hasn't fallen yet. Early season hikers have to contend not only with the snowpack and icy slopes near the passes, but with streams swollen with snowmelt. Trail conditions are less demanding later in the season after the snowmelt concludes, and the weather generally remains pleasant for hiking through September. Weather during the hiking season is generally sunny and dry, but afternoon thunderstorms are not uncommon. The trail is used primarily by backpackers and dayhikers, but also by runners, trail riders, and pack trains. There is a shelter for hikers to stay at on Muir Pass, called the John Muir Hut, which is the only shelter on the trail.

Hikers completing the trail typically take about three weeks. The record for the fastest known time was set by ultrarunner François D'Haene in 2017, who ran from south to north in 2 days, 19 hours and 26 minutes. The previous record of 3 days, 7 hours and 36 minutes, was set by Leor Pantilat in 2014. The record for the fastest trip in an unsupported way was set by Aurélien Sanchez in 2018, who ran from south to north in 3 days, 3 hours and 55 minutes. The previous record of three days, ten hours, and 59 minutes was set by Andrew Bentz in 2014.

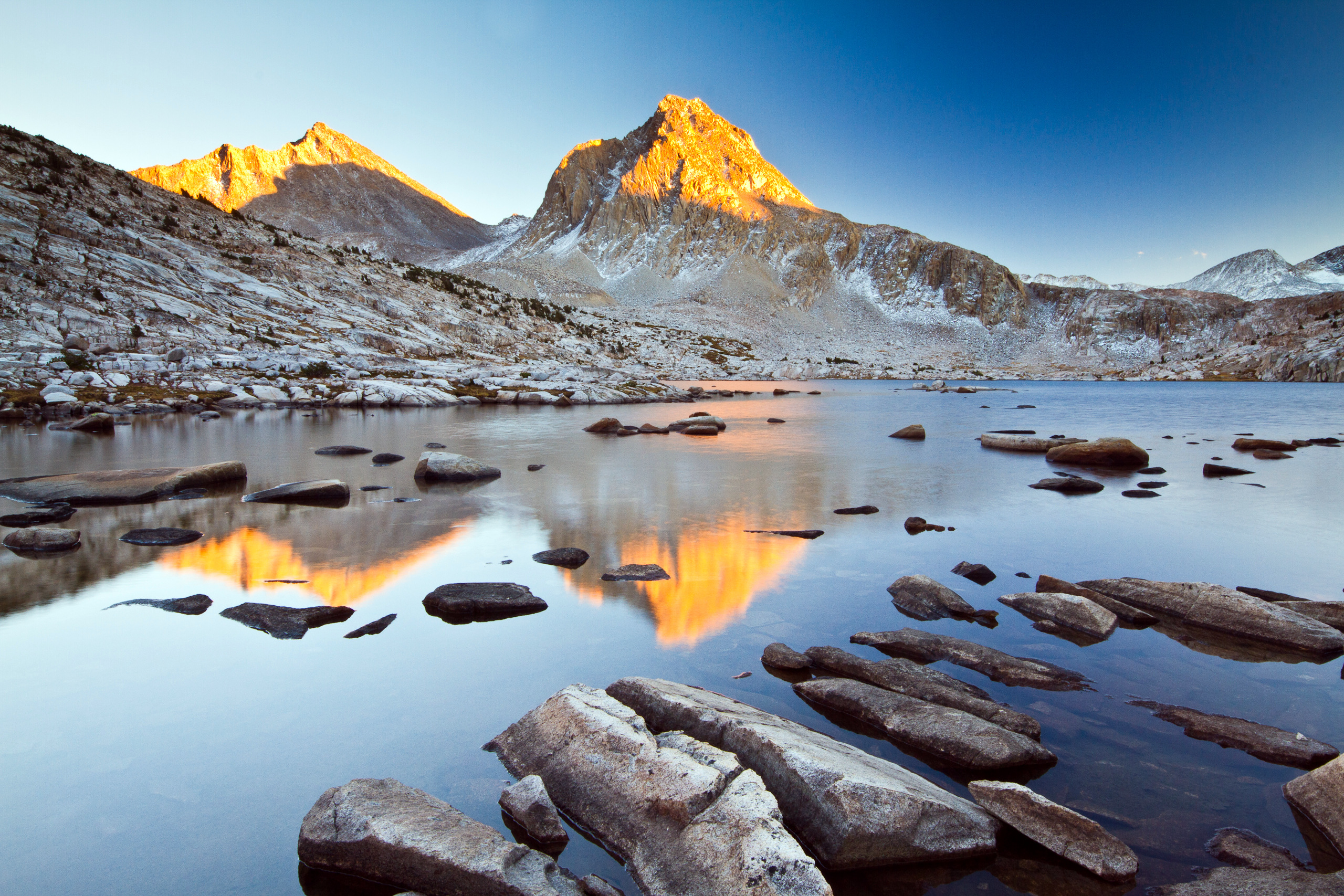
Mts. Fiske and Huxley reflected in Sapphire Lake

A permit is required to hike the JMT, which can be obtained from the national park or forest where the hiker begins the hike, and is available 168 days in advance. This single permit is valid for the entire hike. Permit reservations can be hard to obtain for JMT thru-hikers, but a portion of permits are reserved for walk-ins. The Whitney Portal end of the JMT has a lottery for wilderness permits, and hikers starting in Yosemite face competition with other backpackers simply wanting to camp overnight while hiking Half Dome or to Tuolumne Meadows. Backpackers entering the Sierra backcountry on multi-day trips are generally required to carry their food in approved hard-sided storage containers known as bear canisters to protect their food and other scented items from theft by black bears, which are common in the region.

About 90-96 percent of hikers hike north to south, from Yosemite Valley to Mt. Whitney. There are advantages to starting in Yosemite Valley and hiking south. Although there is a significant net altitude gain this way, starting at a lower altitude allows the hiker time to acclimate to the elevations of the trail rather than immediately having to tackle a 6,000-foot (1,800 m) climb to the summit of Mount Whitney. In addition, there are several resupply points convenient to the JMT during its northern half (Tuolumne Meadows, Reds Meadow, Vermillion Valley Resort, Muir Trail Ranch), allowing the hiker to carry a lighter food load early in the hike and also to exit the trail easily if problems arise. The southern half of the JMT is more remote and generally higher in elevation, thus making it more appropriate for the second half of the hike when maximum conditioning has been attained.

== See also ==
- Ecology of the Sierra Nevada
- Long-distance trails in the United States
- Sierra High Route

== Bibliography ==
- Castle, Alan (2004). The John Muir Trail. Milnthorpe: Cicerone. ISBN 1-85284-396-9.
- Kalkoffen, Gerret (2016). Plan & Go: John Muir Trail. San Diego: sandiburg press. ISBN 978-1943126057.
- Cohen, Michael P. (1988). The History of the Sierra Club 1892 - 1970. San Francisco: Sierra Club Books. ISBN 0-87156-732-6.
- Johnson, Paul C. (1971). Sierra Album. Garden City, NY: Doubleday & Co. ISBN 0-385-04832-7.
- Parsons, Harriet (1947). "Mountaineering". In David R. Brower (ed.). Sierra Club: A Handbook. San Francisco: Sierra Club.
- Starr, Walter A. (November 1947). "Trails". Sierra Club Bulletin. 32 (10). San Francisco: Sierra Club.
- Starr, Walter A. Jr. (1974). Starr's Guide to the John Muir Trail and the High Sierra Region. San Francisco: Sierra Club Books. ISBN 0-87156-172-7.
- Wenk, Elizabeth (2014). The John Muir Trail: The essential guide to hiking America's most famous trail (5th ed.). Berkeley: Wilderness Press. ISBN 978-0-89997-736-2.
- Winnett, Thomas (1970). High Sierra Hiking Guide #4: Tuolumne Meadows. Berkeley: Wilderness Press. ISBN 0-911824-10-3.
- Winnett, Thomas; Morey, Kathy (1998). Guide to the John Muir Trail (3rd ed.). Berkeley, CA: Wilderness Press. ISBN 0-89997-221-7.
