= Lyell Meadow =

Meadow in Yosemite National Park

Coordinates: 37.792°N 119.261°W

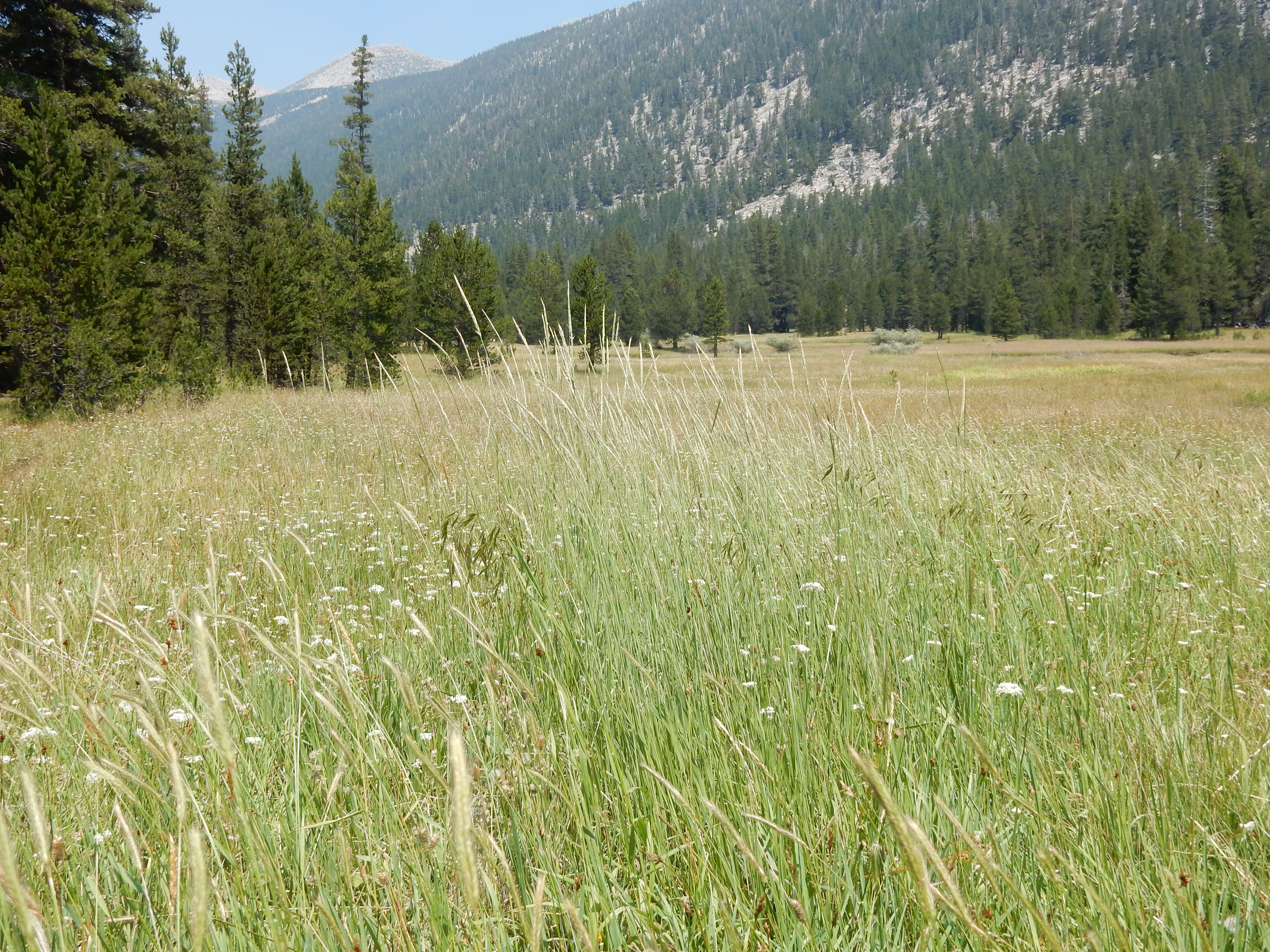

Lyell Meadow is a meadow, in the region of Tuolumne Meadows, in Yosemite National Park.

== Geography ==
Lyell Meadow divides into Lower-Upper Lyell Canyon Meadow, Upper Lyell Meadow, and Lower Lyell Meadow. Lower-Upper Lyell Meadow, is smaller than Upper Lyell Meadow, but is a large meadow encompassing 20.1 acres (8.1 ha).

== See also ==
- Dana Meadows
- Lyell Canyon
- Mount Lyell

== External links and references ==
- Equine trekking, through Lyell Meadow
