= Mount Starr =

Mountain in the state of California

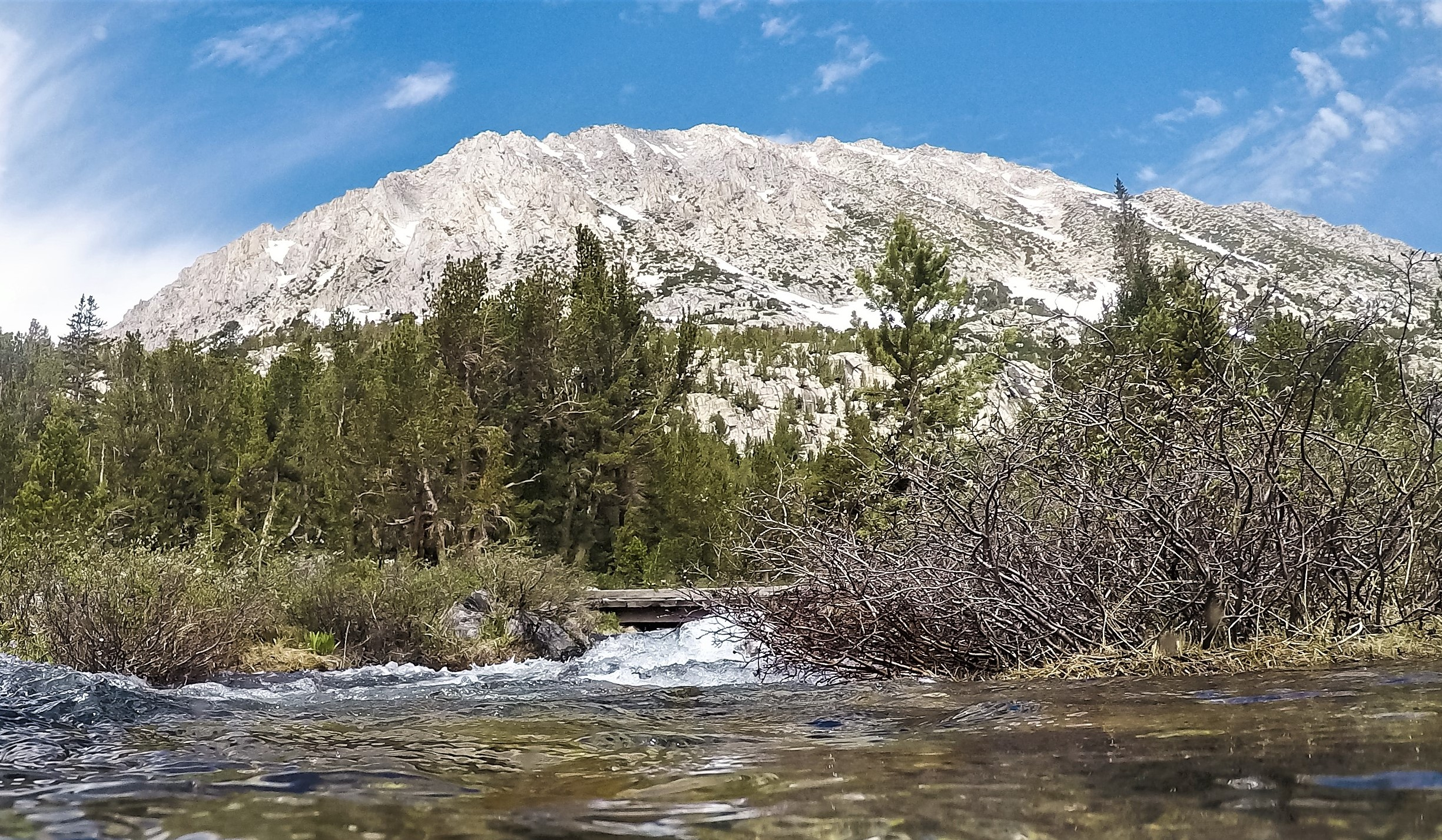
- Southeast aspect

Highest point
- Elevation: 12,835 ft (3,912 m)
- Prominence: 760 ft (232 m)
- Parent peak: Ruby Peak (13,188 ft)
- Isolation: 1.67 mi (2.69 km)
- Listing: Vagmarken Club Sierra Crest List
- Coordinates: 37°25′44″N 118°45′55″W

Naming
- Etymology: Walter A. Starr Jr.

Geography
- Location within California Location within the United States
- Location: Fresno / Inyo counties, California U.S.
- Parent range: Sierra Nevada
- Topo map: USGS Mount Abbot

Climbing
- First ascent: 1896
- Easiest route: class 2 via Mono Pass

Mount Starr, elevation 12,835 feet (3,912 m), is a mountain summit located on the crest of the Sierra Nevada mountain range in northern California, United States. It is situated in the John Muir Wilderness on the common boundary shared by Sierra National Forest with Inyo National Forest, and along the common border of Fresno County with Inyo County. It is bound on the east by Little Lakes Valley, and is 0.8 mile northeast of Mono Pass. Topographic relief is significant as the summit rises 2,300 feet (700 meters) above Little Lakes Valley in approximately one-half mile (0.80 km). Neighbors include Mount Abbot, three miles to the south-southwest, Mount Morgan, 2.5 miles to the southeast, and Pointless Peak is 2.5 miles to the north.

== History ==
The first ascent of this mountain was made July 16, 1896, by Walter Starr Sr. and Allen Chickering. They were caught in a thunderstorm when everything started buzzing with electricity. Frightened, they descended off the mountain quickly, and would name the mountain "Electric Peak." However, the mountain would later be renamed after Walter Starr's son.

Named by the Sierra Club to honor one of their own, this mountain's toponym was officially adopted in 1939 by the United States Board on Geographic Names to remember Walter A. Starr Jr. (1903–1933), a mountain climber of renown, and author of "Guide to the John Muir Trail and the High Sierra Region." In the summer of 1933, "Pete", as he was nicknamed, failed to return from a month-long hike to the Minarets, and his body was eventually discovered by Norman Clyde following a search.

== Climate ==
According to the Köppen climate classification system, Mount Starr is located in an alpine climate zone. Most weather fronts originate in the Pacific Ocean, and travel east toward the Sierra Nevada mountains. As fronts approach, they are forced upward by the peaks (orographic lift), causing them to drop their moisture in the form of rain or snowfall onto the range. Precipitation runoff from the west side of this mountain drains into Golden Creek, and from the east side into Rock Creek.

== Gallery ==
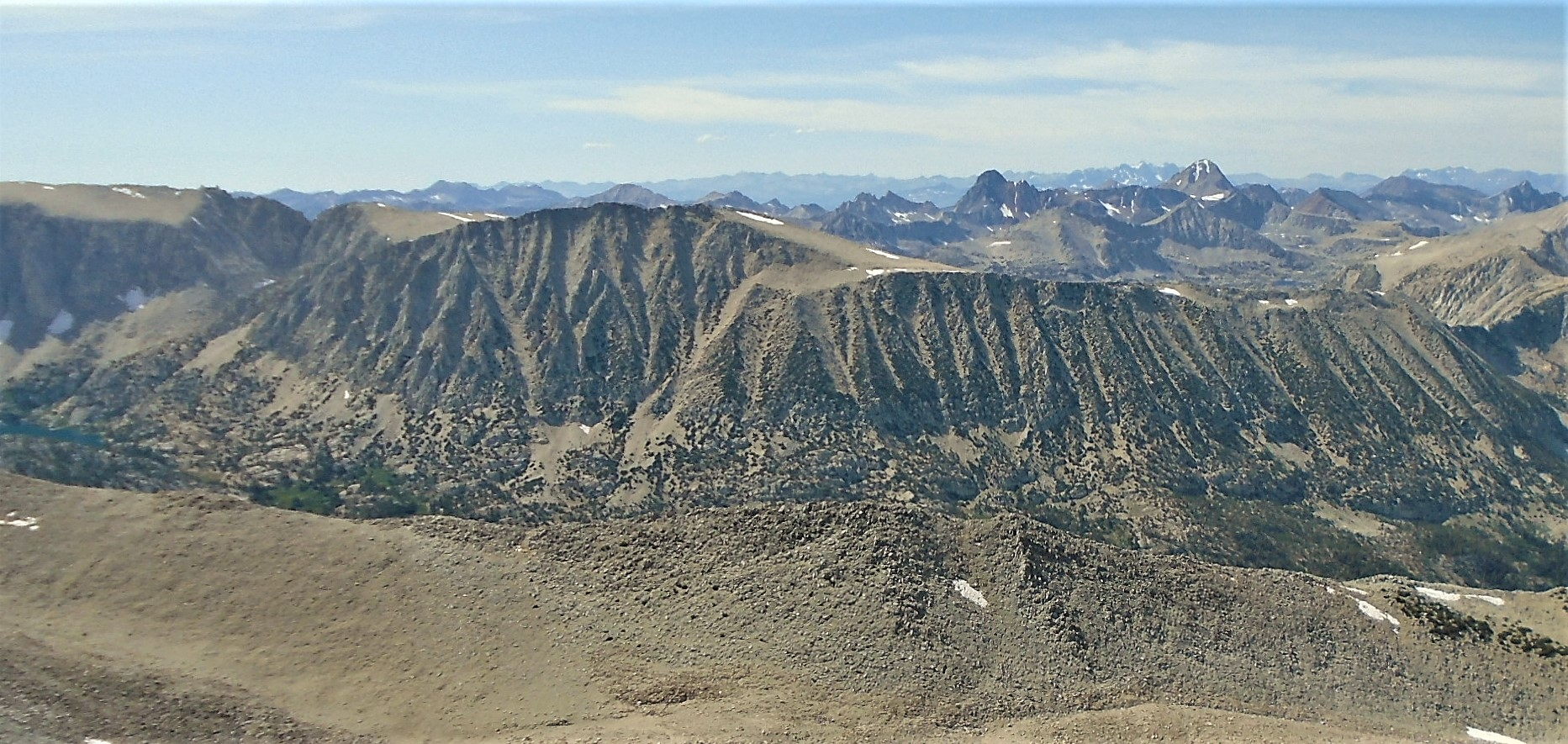
East aspect

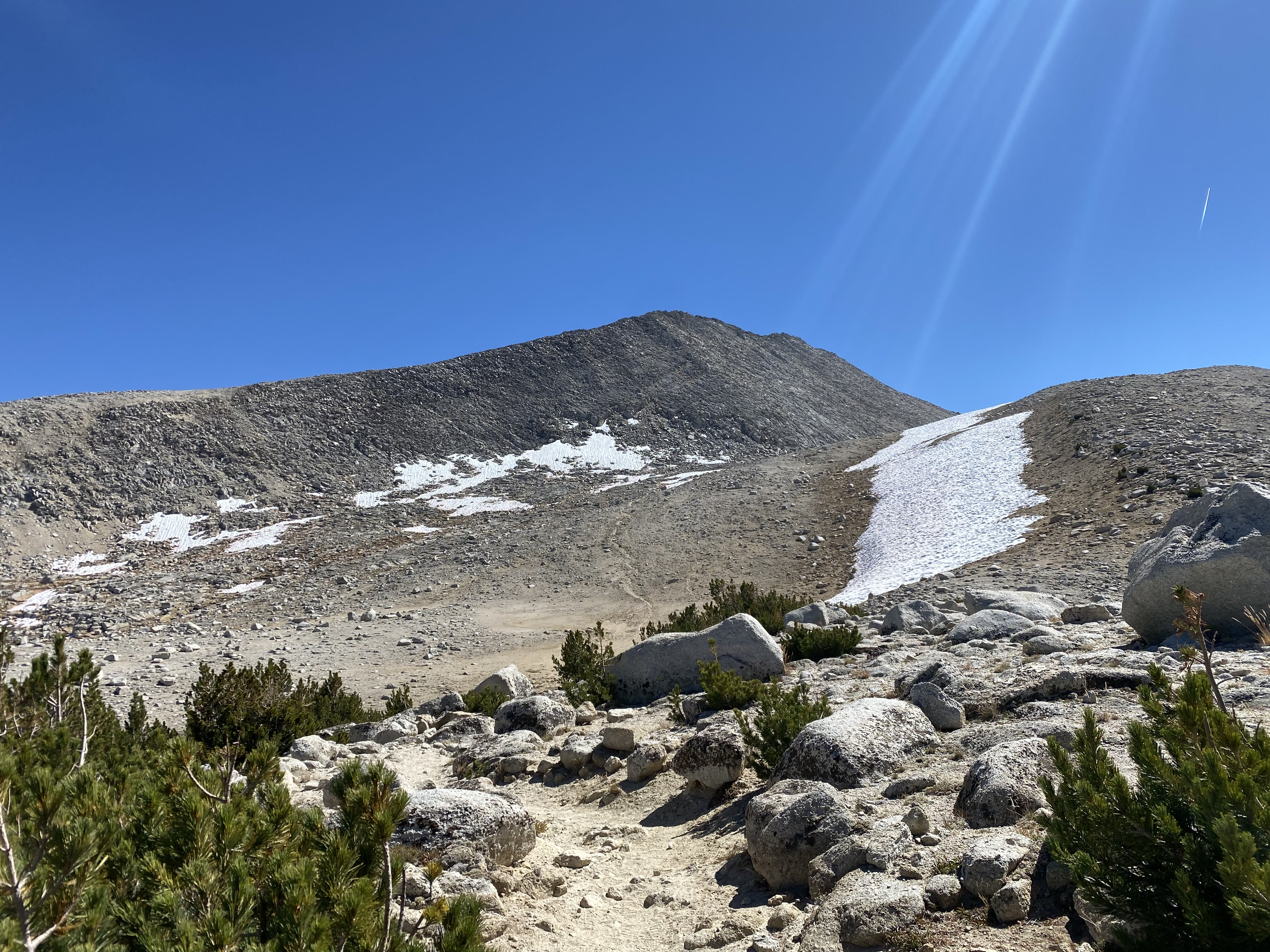
North aspect

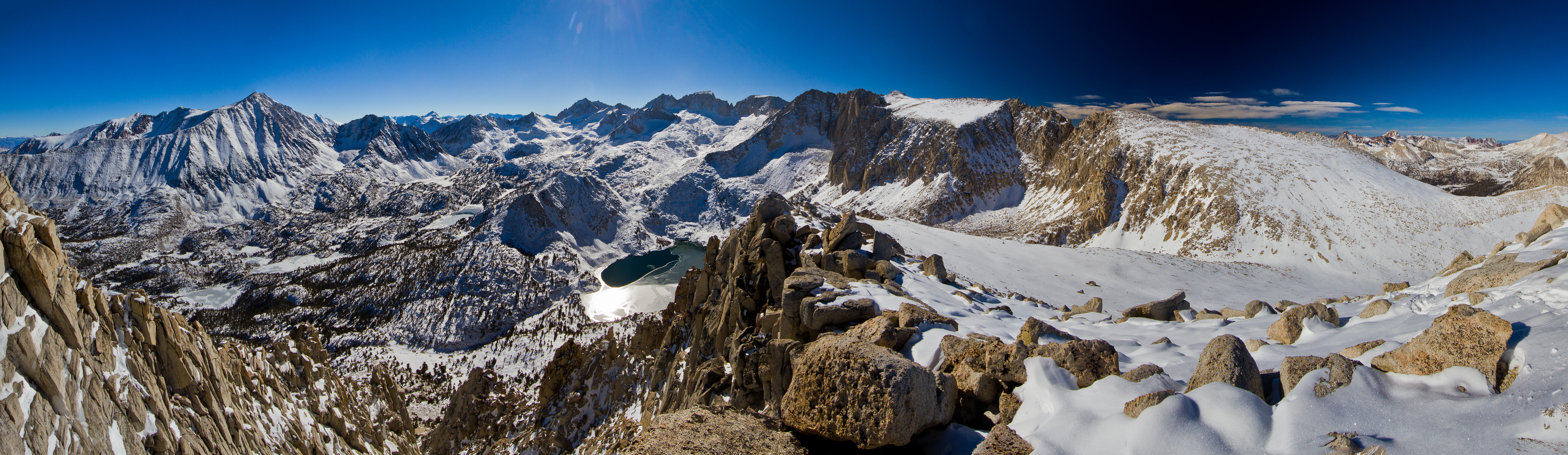
View from summit looking south

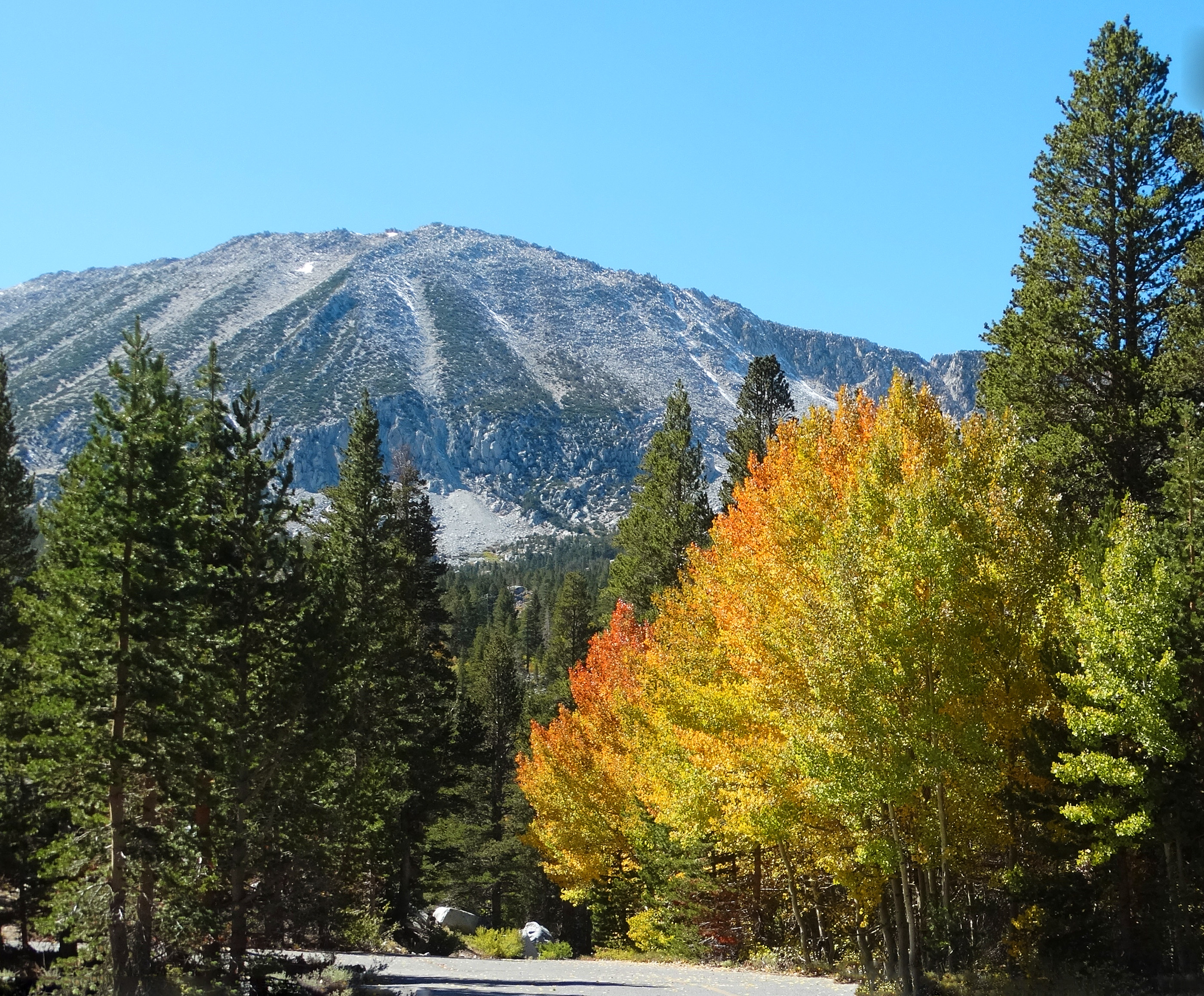
The north end of Mt. Starr seen from Bear Creek Lake area

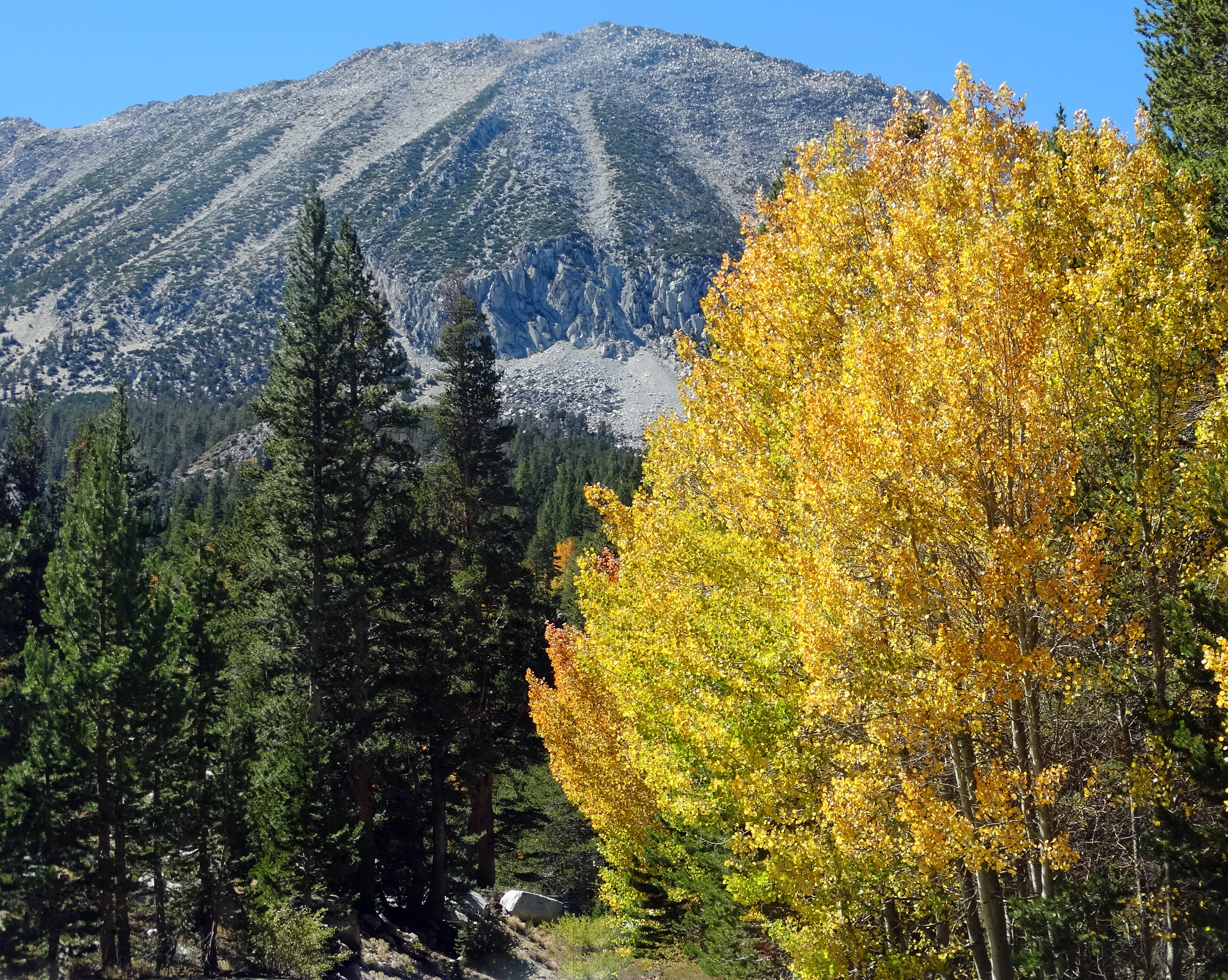
The north end of Mt. Starr seen from Bear Creek Lake area

== See also ==
- List of the major 4000-meter summits of California
