= Dana Meadows (Yosemite) =

Meadows near Mount Dana, United States

Coordinates: 37°53′37″N 119°15′19″W

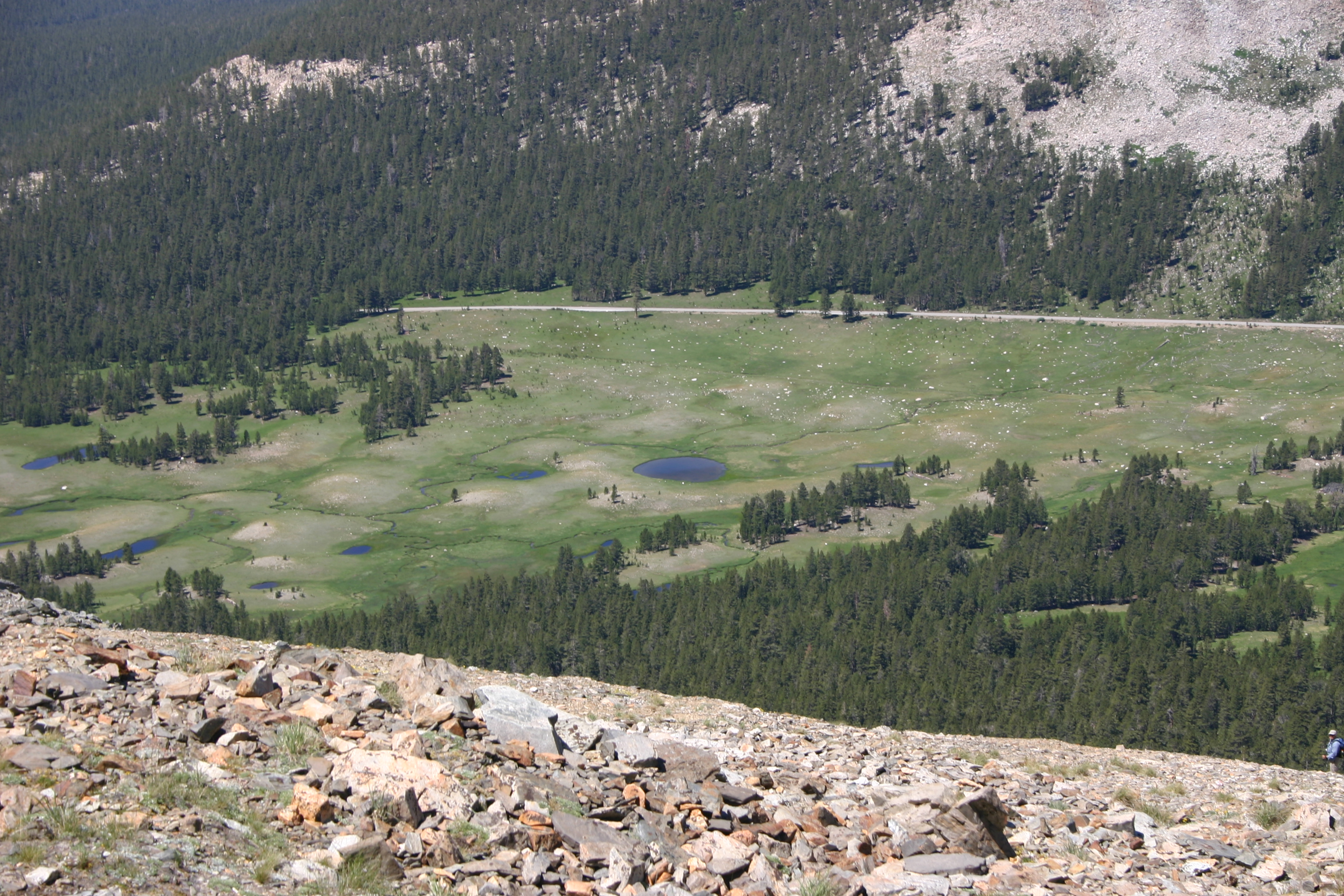
Dana Meadows looking from Mount Dana.

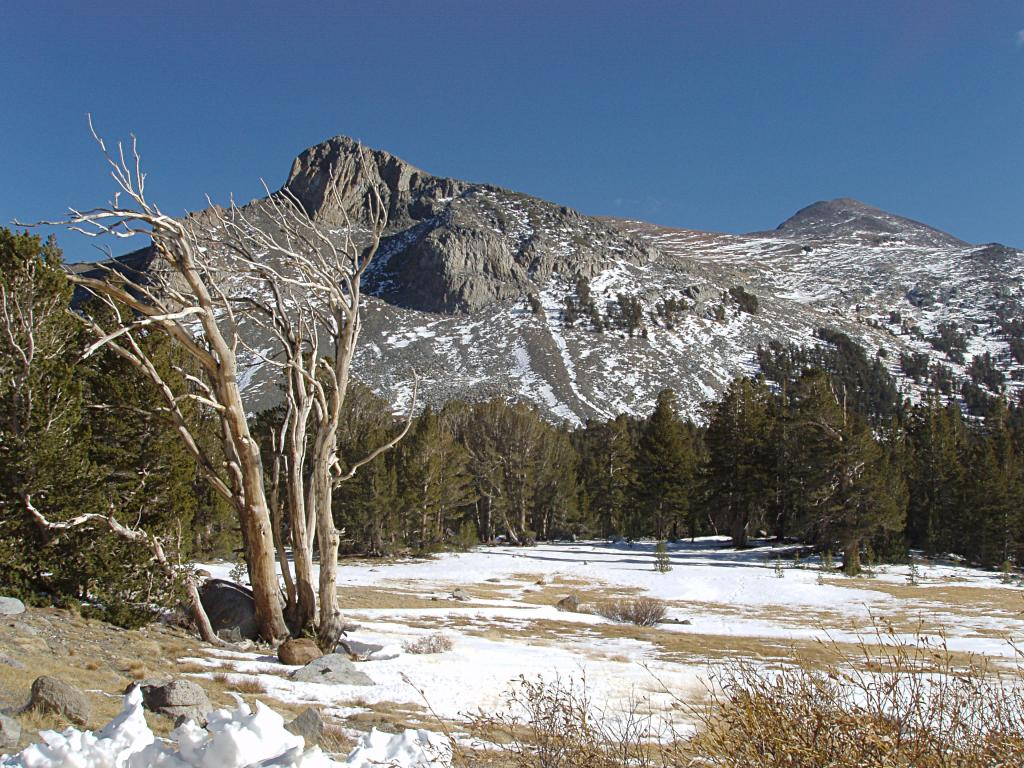
Dana Meadows with Mount Dana in the background.

The Dana Meadows can be found at the eastern entrance to Yosemite National Park, at the foot of Mount Dana, not far from Tuolumne Meadows and the Tioga Pass entrance station.

== Description ==
The Dana Fork of the Tuolumne River originates adjacent to the meadows, and flows west through them towards its junction with the Lyell Fork of the Tuolumne River.

At an altitude of 9,728 feet (2,965 m), the meadow can be covered in snow up to 162 inches (411 cm) deep in wintertime. In June or July, it is springtime in these meadows, but snow can come at any time, especially after 1 September.

Before Yosemite became a park, Basque sheepherders would graze their flocks here, and in other areas of the Sierra Nevada. Often lonely, they would carve their initials into the trees of the meadow, several of which are still visible. (In hunting season, some animals of the Sierra, such as the deer, have learned to migrate into the park.)

The meadows are named for James Dwight Dana (1813–1895), a professor of geology and natural history at Yale.

== See also ==
- Lyell Meadow
