= Susan Thew Parks =

American environmental advocate (1878–1968)

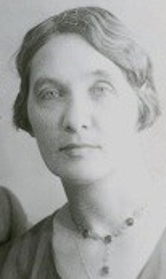
- Born: Susan Priscilla Thew; 5 April 1878; Caledonia, Ohio
- Died: 29 January 1968 (aged 89); Napa, California
- Occupations: explorer, botanical collector, environmentalist and photographer
- Known for: Advocating for the expansion of the Sequoia National Park
- Notable work: The proposed Roosevelt-Sequoia national park.

Susan Priscilla Parks (née Thew, 5 April 1878 – 29 January 1968) was an American explorer, photographer, plant collector and advocate for the expansion of the Sequoia National Park in the southern Sierra Nevada.

== Early life ==
Parks was born in Caledonia, Ohio on 5 April 1878 to Sarah Priscilla and Richard Thew. Her father was an inventor and an industrialist. The family subsequently moved to California.

== Advocacy for the expansion of Sequoia National Park ==
In 1918 Parks made her first visit to the Sequoia National Park. She subsequently became acquainted with the superintendent of the park, John R. White and the efforts being made to advocate for the enlargement of the park. Parks became a vocal advocate supporting these efforts. In August 1923, Parks began to explore the High Sierras and photographed as much of the land as she could. She continued to undertake explorations of the High Sierras over subsequent summers and amassed a significant photographic record of the area. Parks then used these photographs to produce a gazetteer entitled The proposed Roosevelt-Sequoia national park. Parks distributed this publication to members of Congress to generate support for the 1926 bill proposing the expansion of the Sequoia National Park. As a result of this and efforts by other advocates, the bill was successfully passed and the Sequoia National Park expanded to cover the Great Western Divide, the Kaweah Peaks, the Kern Canyon, and the Sierra Crest. The Sequoia National Park tripled in size.

The success of Parks' advocacy methods inspired Ansel Adams to replicate them. He went on to use her methods to advocate for in the creation of Kings Canyon National Park.

Parks became a member of the Sierra Club.

== Plant collecting ==
In October 1927 Parks married her husband Harold Ernest Parks, a botanist and botanical collector. After her marriage, Parks partnered with her husband, undertaking botanical field trips and collecting numerous botanical specimens. They amassed a significant and scientifically important collection of herbarium specimens that continues to contribute to science.
