= Walter A. Starr Jr. =

American mountain climber

Walter A. "Pete" Starr Jr. (1903–1933) was an American lawyer and mountain climber.

A graduate of Stanford University, Starr was a respected lawyer in San Francisco, but he is better known for his abilities as a mountain climber and an explorer of the Sierra Nevada. Starr was well known for his hiking ability in the mountains, sometimes walking up to 50 miles a day for several days in a row. Starr was a life member of the Sierra Club.

In August 1933, he failed to return from a month-long hike in the Minarets. The search that followed, which led to the eventual discovery of his body by Norman Clyde, is one of the most dramatic true tales of the Sierra exploration. His body was buried where it was found.

Starr's final notes were compiled and edited by his father into "Starr’s Guide to the John Muir Trail and the High Sierra Region" which was published a year after his death by the Sierra Club. This book has been edited and revised many times and served hikers and climbers for many years as the standard reference to the trails of the Sierra. A revised version is currently available.

Walter Starr is the namesake of Mount Starr in the Sierra Nevada.
