= Donohue Pass =

Mountain pass in the Sierra Nevada, California

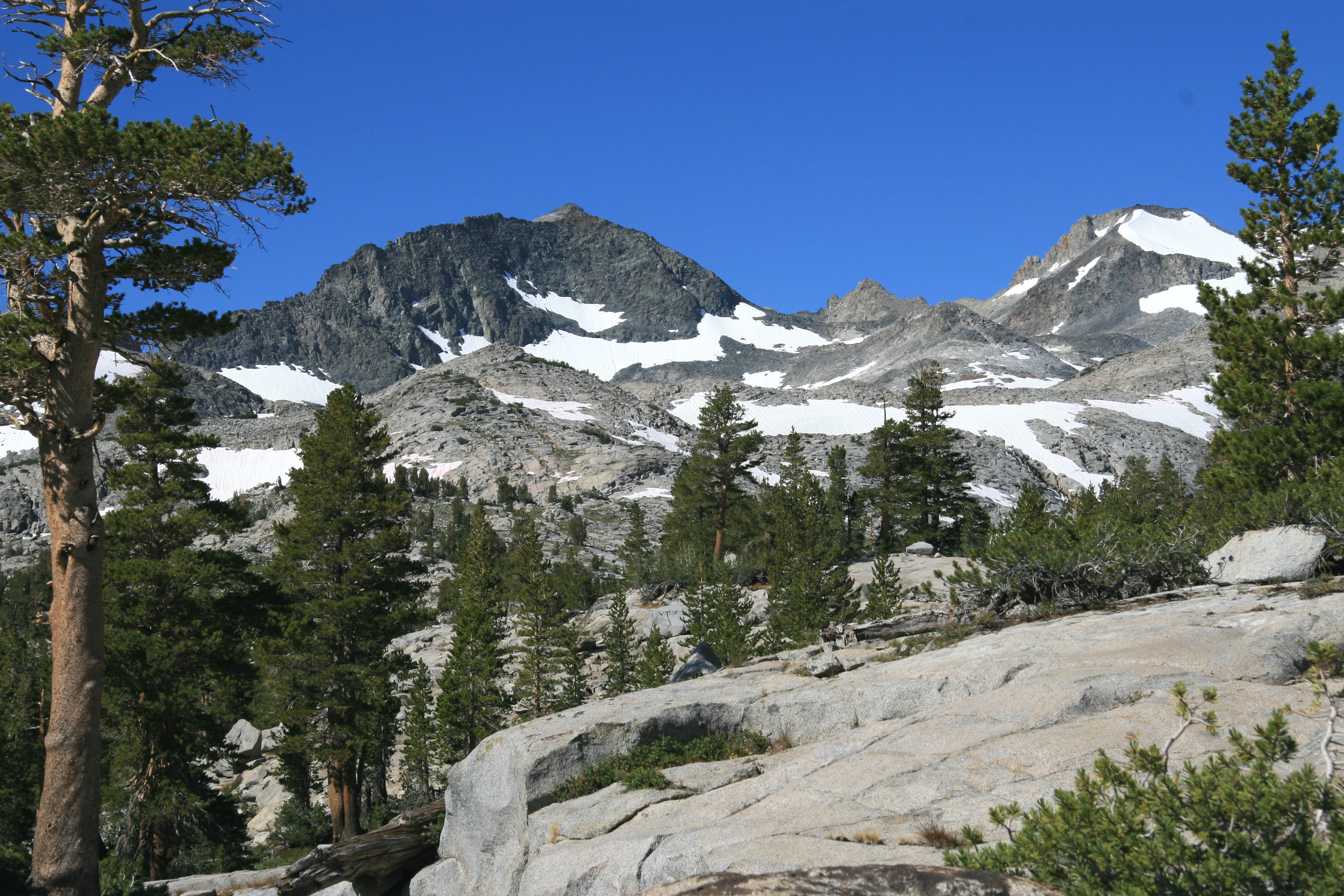
- Ritter Range near Pacific Crest Trail South of Donahue Pass

- Location within California Location within the United States
- Elevation: 11,066 feet (3,373 m)
- Traversed by: John Muir Trail; Pacific Crest Trail

Third Approach
- Location: Mono / Tuolumne counties, California, U.S
- Range: Sierra Nevada
- Coordinates: 37°45′37″N 119°14′55″W
- Topo map: USGS Koip Peak

Donohue Pass is a high mountain pass on the boundary between Yosemite National Park and the Ansel Adams Wilderness. Its elevation is 11,066 feet (3,373 m). It is situated between Mount Lyell and Donohue Peak. The John Muir Trail and the Pacific Crest Trail both transverse the pass. Following the John Muir Trail, the pass is 6.3 miles (10.1 km) from Thousand Island Lake, and 12.8 miles (20.6 km) from Tuolumne Meadows. Donohue Pass is the sixth highest pass of the ten named passes on the John Muir Trail.

The pass and Donohue Peak were named in 1895 for Sergeant Donohue, Troop K, 4th Cavalry who made the first ascent of the peak.

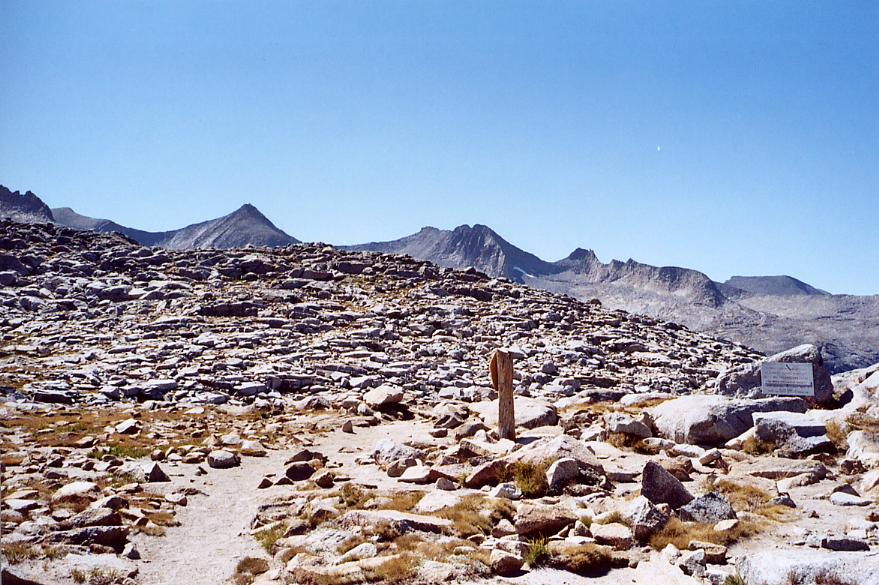
The sign marking the top of Donohue Pass
