= Granite Domes of Yosemite National Park =

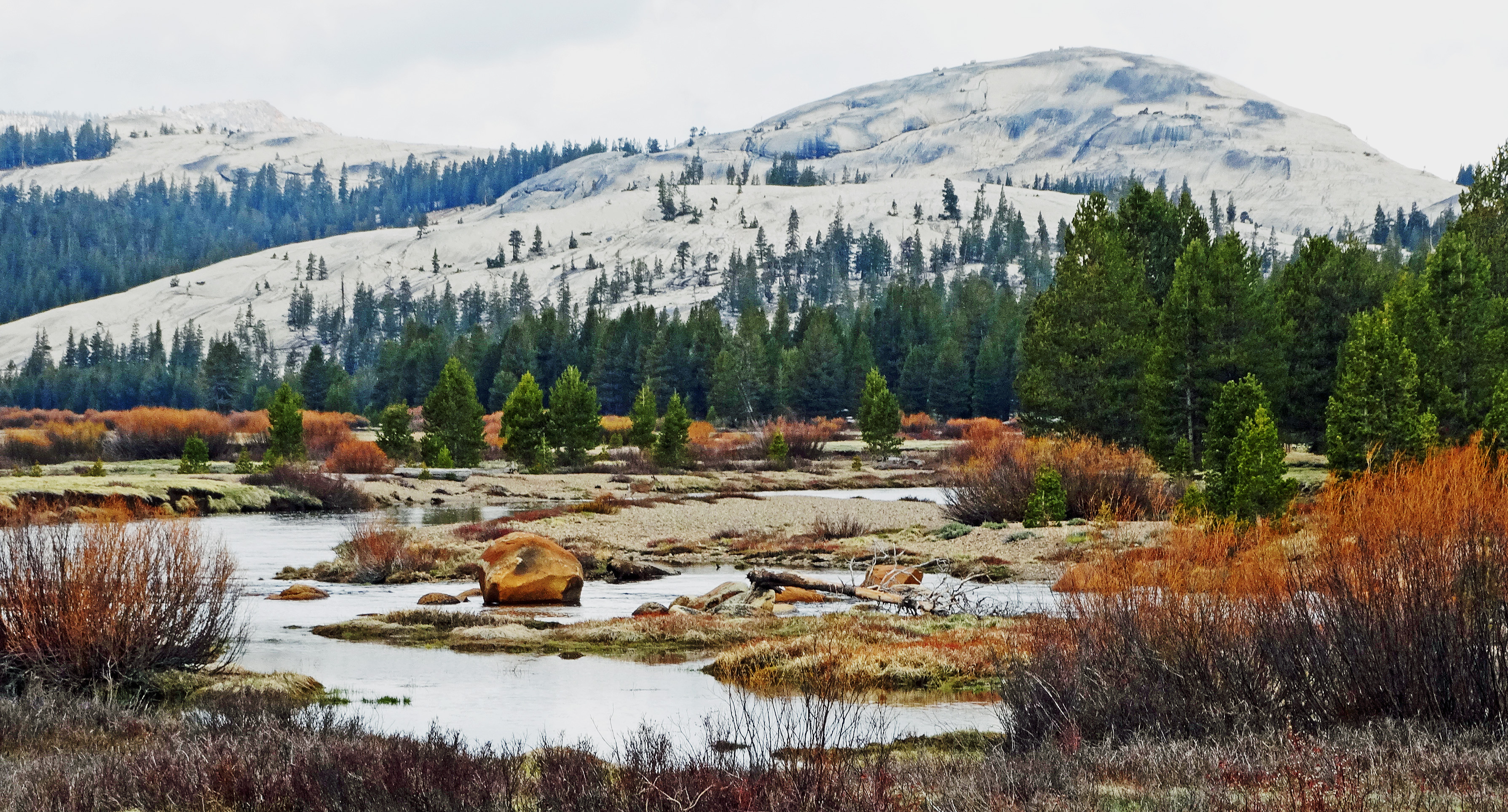

Yosemite National Park is well known for its granite domes:

Sortable table
| Name of Dome | Summit Elevation | Clean prominence | County | Region of Yosemite | References |
|---|---|---|---|---|---|
| Basket Dome | 2,320 metres (7,610 ft) | 64 metres (210 ft) | Mariposa County | Yosemite Valley | |
| Daff Dome | 2,790 metres (9,150 ft) | 157 metres (515 ft) | Tuolumne County | Tuolumne Meadows | |
| Doda Dome | 2,715 metres (8,907 ft) | 82 metres (269 ft) | Tuolumne County | Tuolumne Meadows | |
| Dog Dome | 2,865 metres (9,400 ft) | 24 metres (79 ft) | Tuolumne County | Tuolumne Meadows | |
| Dozier Dome | 2,847 metres (9,341 ft) | 12 metres (39 ft) | Mariposa County | Lake Tenaya | |
| Drug Dome | 2,769 metres (9,085 ft) | 0 metres (0 ft) | Mariposa County | Tuolumne Meadows | |
| East Cottage Dome, also, "Erratic Dome" | 2,780 metres (9,120 ft) | 61 metres (200 ft) | Tuolumne County | Tuolumne Meadows | |
| East Quarter Dome | 2,535 metres (8,317 ft) | 36 metres (118 ft) | Mariposa County | Yosemite Valley | |
| Fairview Dome | 2,964 metres (9,724 ft) | 184 metres (604 ft) | Tuolumne County | Tuolumne Meadows | |
| Half Dome | 2,694 metres (8,839 ft) | 415 metres (1,362 ft) | Mariposa County | Yosemite Valley/Little Yosemite Valley | |
| Hammer Dome | 2,665 metres (8,743 ft) | 56 metres (184 ft) | Tuolumne County | Tuolumne Meadows | |
| Harlequin Dome | 2,710 metres (8,890 ft) | | Mariposa County | Lake Tenaya | |
| Hetch Hetchy Dome | 1,889 metres (6,198 ft) | 72 metres (236 ft) | Tuolumne County | Hetch Hetchy | |
| Kolana Rock | 1,759 metres (5,771 ft) | 192 metres (630 ft) | Mariposa County | Hetch Hetchy | |
| Lamb Dome | 2,806 metres (9,206 ft) | 117 metres (384 ft) | Tuolumne County | Tuolumne Meadows/Lake Tenaya | |
| Lembert Dome | 2,880 metres (9,450 ft) | 88 metres (289 ft) | Tuolumne County | Tuolumne Meadows | |
| Liberty Cap | 2,157 feet (657 m) | 304 metres (997 ft) | Mariposa County | Little Yosemite Valley | |
| Mariolumne Dome | 3,039 metres (9,970 ft) | 143 metres (469 ft) | Tuolumne County | Tuolumne Meadows/Lake Tenaya | |
| Marmot Dome | 2,829 metres (9,281 ft) | 13 metres (43 ft) | Tuolumne County | Tuolumne Meadows | |
| Medlicott Dome | 3,011 metres (9,879 ft) | 61 metres (200 ft) | Mariposa County/Tuolumne County | Tuolumne Meadows/Lake Tenaya | |
| Moraine Dome | 2,440 metres (8,010 ft) | 60 metres (200 ft) | Mariposa County | Little Yosemite Valley | |
| North Dome | 2,299 metres (7,543 ft) | 43 metres (141 ft) | Mariposa County | Yosemite Valley | |
| North Whizz Dome | 2,707 metres (8,881 ft) | 37 metres (121 ft) | Tuolumne County | Tuolumne Meadows/Lake Tenaya | |
| Polly Dome | 2,989 metres (9,806 ft) | 331 metres (1,086 ft) | Mariposa County | Lake Tenaya | |
| Pothole Dome | 2,670 metres (8,760 ft) | 12 metres (39 ft) | Tuolumne County | Tuolumne Meadows | |
| Puppy Dome | 2,670 metres (8,760 ft) | 24 metres (79 ft) | Tuolumne County | Tuolumne Meadows | |
| Pywiack Dome | 2,698 metres (8,852 ft) | 77 metres (253 ft) | Mariposa County | Lake Tenaya | |
| SAR Dome | 2,691 metres (8,829 ft) | 76 metres (249 ft) | Tuolumne County | Glen Aulin High Sierra Camp | |
| Scar Dome | 2,697 metres (8,848 ft) | 27 metres (89 ft) | Tuolumne County | Glen Aulin High Sierra Camp | |
| Scary Dome | 2,684 metres (8,806 ft) | 26 metres (85 ft) | Tuolumne County | Glen Aulin High Sierra Camp | |
| Sentinel Dome | 2,476 metres (8,123 ft) | 99 metres (325 ft) | Mariposa County | Glacier Point | |
| South Whizz Dome | 2,707 metres (8,881 ft) | 25 metres (82 ft) | Tuolumne County | Tuolumne Meadows | |
| Stately Pleasure Dome | 2,755 metres (9,039 ft) | 0 metres (0 ft) | Mariposa County | Lake Tenaya | |
| Sugarloaf Dome | 2,342 metres (7,684 ft) | 99 metres (325 ft) | Mariposa County | Little Yosemite Valley | |
| Turtleback Dome | 1,615 metres (5,299 ft) | 6 metres (20 ft) | Mariposa County | Wildcat Falls | |
| V-Tree Dome | 2,559 metres (8,396 ft) | 47 metres (154 ft) | Tuolumne County | Grand Canyon of the Tuolumne | |
| Wawona Dome | 2,102 metres (6,896 ft) | 17 metres (56 ft) | Mariposa County | Chilnualna Falls | |
| West Cottage Dome | 2,755 metres (9,039 ft) | 12 metres (39 ft) | Tuolumne County | Tuolumne Meadows | |
| West Quarter Dome | 2,487 metres (8,159 ft) | 12 metres (39 ft) | Mariposa County | Little Yosemite Valley | |
