= Mariolumne Dome =

Granite dome in Yosemite National Park, USA

Mariuolumne Dome
- Location within California Location within the United States

Highest point
- Elevation: 9,970 ft (3,040 m) NAVD 88
- Prominence: 470 ft (140 m) NAVD 88
- Coordinates: 37.862°N 119.422°W

Geography
- Location: Yosemite National Park, Tuolumne County, California, U.S.
- Parent range: Sierra Nevada

Mariolumne Dome is a granite dome, in the Tuolumne Meadows region of Yosemite National Park.

== Naming ==
Mariuolumne is a concatenation of the names Mariposa and Tuolumne; the border between the two counties is near the base of Mariolumne Dome.

== Geography ==
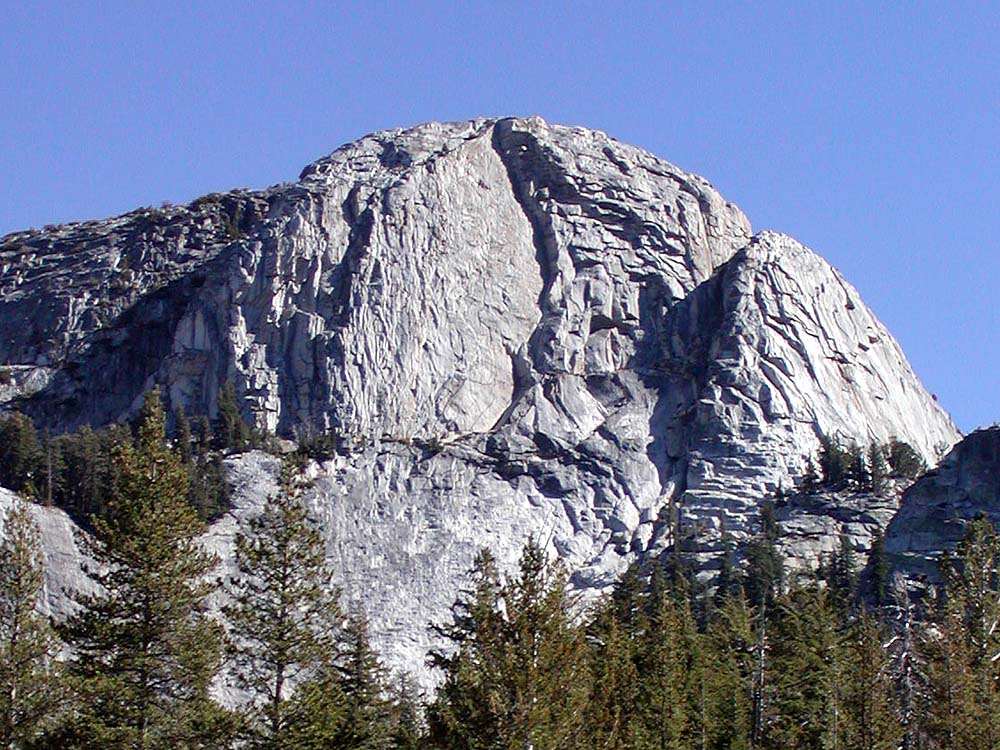
Mariuolumne Dome

Mariuolumne Dome is 9,970 feet (3,040 m) high, the tallest dome of Tuolumne Meadows. With a freestanding height of 700 feet (210 m) feet, it is second only to Fairview Dome. At its foot on the north lies Drug Dome. Lamb Dome is 0.5 miles (0.80 km) north. To the west and south is the long wall of Medlicott Dome, forming the western rampart of a common massif.

Mariuolumne Dome's main attraction is its rock climbing routes, though its height makes it worth hiking. On the east side, it is easy class 2, readily accessible via trail and some cross country.

From Marioulumne Dome's top, one has a panoramic view of Tuolumne high country: Cathedral Peak and Eichorn's pinnacle are near to the east; Tresidder Peak and Tenaya Peaks are to the south; Tenaya Lake, Pywiack Dome and Stately Pleasure Dome are to the southwest; and Fairview Dome and Daff Dome to the northeast.

== Rock climbing ==
Mariolumne Dome has a number of rock climbing routes.
