= South Whizz Dome =

Granite dome in Yosemite National Park, USA

- Location within California Location within the United States

Highest point
- Elevation: 8,880 ft (2,710 m) NAVD 88
- Prominence: 80 ft (24 m)
- Coordinates: 37°52′N 119°26′W

Geography
- Location: Yosemite National Park, Tuolumne County, California, U.S.
- Parent range: Ritter Range, Sierra Nevada

South Whizz Dome is a granite dome in the Tuolumne Meadows area of Yosemite National Park. South Whizz Dome is a bit south of Cathedral Creek, which has its source near Cathedral Peak. South Whizz Dome Dome is north of both Medlicott Dome and Pywiack Dome, both of which are south of California State Route 120 which runs through Tuolumne Meadows to Tioga Pass. It is near Hammer Dome. Daff Dome and Polly Dome are nearby.

== On South Whizz Dome's particulars ==
South Whizz Dome is close to North Whizz Dome, and the two are often spoken of together. The Whizz Domes are actually two domes, next to each other: North and South Whizz domes, which are between Polly Dome and Daff Dome on Tioga Road (120).

South Whizz Dome has a few rock climbing routes.
