= Medlicott Dome =

Granite dome in Yosemite National Park, USA

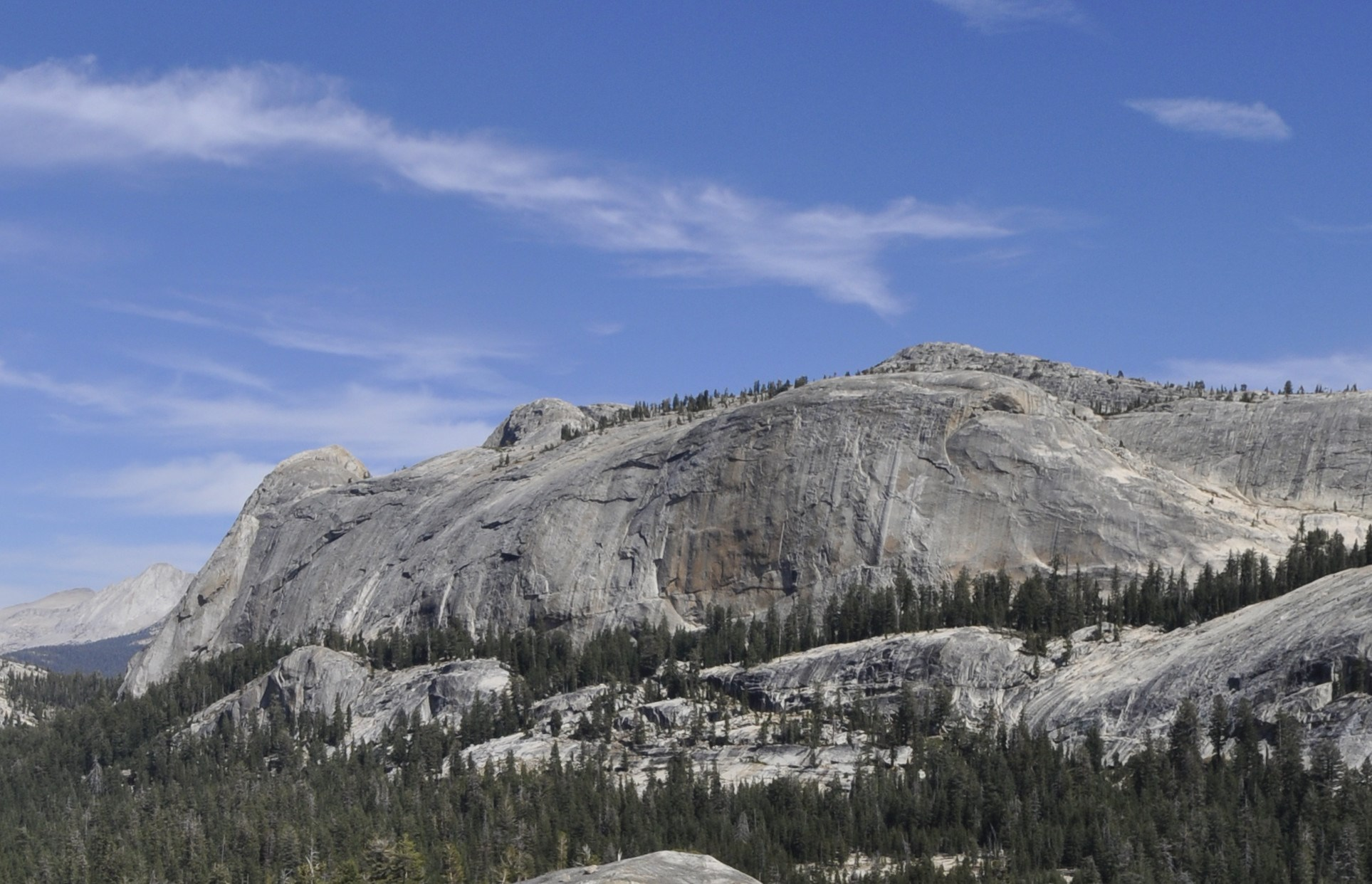
- Medlicott Dome seen from Pywiack Dome.

Highest point
- Elevation: 9,665 ft (2,946 m) NAVD 88
- Prominence: 1,086 ft (331 m)
- Coordinates: 37°51′23″N 119°25′34″W

Geography
- Location within California Location within the United States
- Location: Yosemite National Park, Tuolumne County, California, U.S.
- Parent range: Sierra Nevada
- Topo map: USGS Tenaya Lake

Climbing
- Easiest route: class 3 scrambling

Medlicott Dome is a prominent granite dome in Yosemite high country. It is located on the southeast side of Tioga Road, between Mariolumne Dome and Dozier Dome, near Pywiack Dome, the Cathedral lakes, Drug Dome, East Cottage Dome, West Cottage Dome, North and South Whizz Domes, and Fairview Dome. It is popular with climbers, hikers and backpackers due to relative ease of access and ascent, as well as scenic views of Yosemite.

== Etymology ==
The dome was named after Henry P. Medlicott. In 1882, with H. B. Carpenter, Medlicott surveyed the Great Sierra Wagon Road (now known as Tioga Road) through Yosemite. Henry P. Medlicott was a judge and US Deputy Mineral Surveyor from Lundy, California. The original name of the peak, recorded in 1870, was "Court House Rock." In 1882, a mining publication referred to it as "Mount Medlicott". The present name, first recorded in 1883, initially appeared on a quadrangle map in 1956.

== Climbing ==
Medlicott Dome has a large number of climbing routes, most of which are bolted faces with occasional cracks and offwidths.
