= East Cottage Dome =

Granite dome in Yosemite National Park, USA

- Location within California Location within the United States

Highest point
- Elevation: 9,120 ft (2,780 m) NAVD 88
- Prominence: 200 ft (61 m)
- Coordinates: 37°53′N 119°24′W

Geography
- Location: Yosemite National Park, Tuolumne County, California, U.S.
- Parent range: Ritter Range, Sierra Nevada

East Cottage Dome, also, Erratic Dome, is a granite dome in the Tuolumne Meadows area of Yosemite National Park.

East Cottage Dome is near Daff Dome, Drug Dome, and Medlicott Dome.

== On East Cottage Dome's particulars ==
See also West Cottage Dome, which is quite close.

East Cottage Dome has a few rock climbing routes.

== External links and references ==
- One rock climbing reference
- More rock climbing
- Rock climbing The Peanut Gallery
