= Hammer Dome =

Granite dome in Yosemite National Park, USA

- Location within California Location within the United States

Highest point
- Elevation: 8,744 ft (2,665 m) NAVD 88
- Prominence: 184 ft (56 m)
- Coordinates: 37°53′N 119°26′W

Geography
- Location: Yosemite National Park, Tuolumne County, California, U.S.
- Parent range: Ritter Range, Sierra Nevada

Hammer Dome, is a granite dome in the Tuolumne Meadows area of Yosemite National Park. Hammer Dome is a bit north, of Cathedral Creek, which has its source, near Cathedral Peak. Hammer Dome is loosely northwest of Fairview Dome, is north of both Medlicott Dome and Pywiack Dome, all three of which are south of California State Route 120, which runs through Tuolumne Meadows to Tioga Pass. North and South Whizz Domes are close.

It is recommended that visitors bring mosquito repellent.

== On Hammer Dome's particulars ==
Hammer Dome has a few rock climbing routes.
