= Ragged Peak (Yosemite) =

Ragged Peak is mountain in Yosemite National Park, in the Tuolumne Meadows area

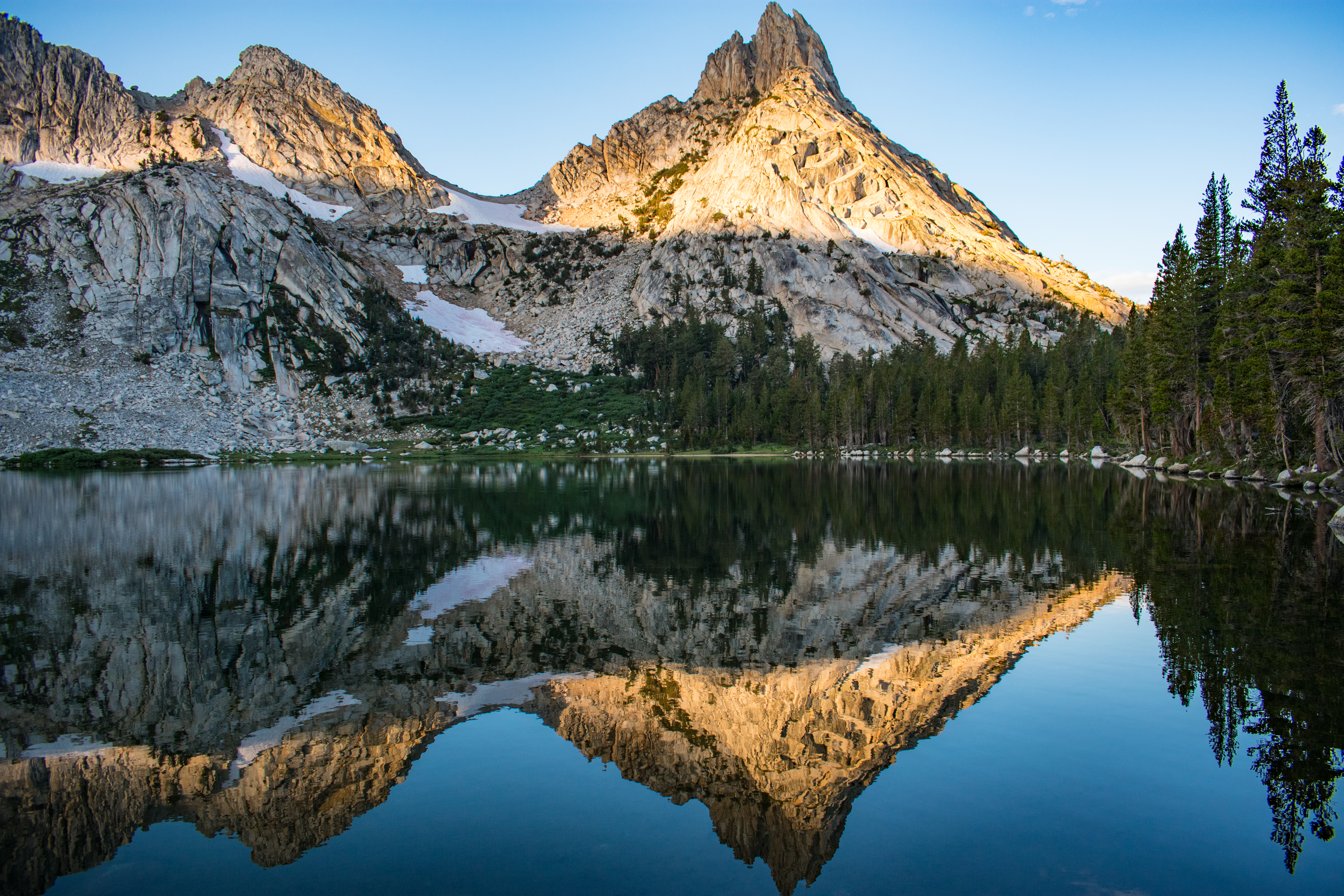
- Ragged peak glows from the reflected sunlight of the clouds before the sun crested the horizon.

Highest point
- Elevation: 10,917 ft (3,328 m) NAVD 88
- Prominence: 432 ft (132 m)
- Coordinates: 37°55′59″N 119°21′12″W

Geography
- Location within California Location within the United States
- Location: Yosemite National Park, Tuolumne County, California, U.S.
- Parent range: Ritter Range, Sierra Nevada

Climbing
- First ascent: 1863, by William Brewer and Charles Hoffman

Ragged Peak is a mountain, in the Tuolumne Meadows area of Yosemite National Park.

Of the ridge south of the Young Lakes region, Ragged Peak is the most prominent feature. It is 4 miles (6.4 km) north of Tioga Road and its summit has a great view of Mount Conness's southwest face.

Ragged Peak is an isolated summit, close to Young Lakes.

Ragged Peak is north of Lembert Dome and Dog Lake.

== On climbing Ragged Peak ==
Ragged Peak has a class 2 — class 3 southern route, and the northwest face is listed as class 5, the northeast face as class 5.6, the east face as class 5.

So, Ragged Peak is available, for rock climbing.
