= Drug Dome =

Granite dome in Yosemite National Park, USA

- Location within California Location within the United States

Highest point
- Elevation: 9,400 ft (2,900 m)
- Coordinates: 37°51′54″N 119°25′19″W

Geography
- Location: Yosemite National Park, Tuolumne County, California, U.S.
- Parent range: Sierra Nevada

Drug Dome is a granite dome in the Tuolumne Meadows area of Yosemite National Park. Drug Dome is just west of Fairview Dome. It is also near Mariolumne Dome, Lamb Dome and Medlicott Dome.

Despite Drug Dome's close proximity to the road, it is one of Tuolumne Meadows's more obscure domes. It is a short distance west of Daff Dome and Fairview Dome.

== On Drug Dome's particulars ==
Drug Dome has a few rock climbing routes.

== External links and references ==
- On a rock climb on Drug Dome, called Oz
- Another reference, gives directions, to Drug Dome
