= Dog Lake (California) =

Lake in Yosemite National Park in California, United States

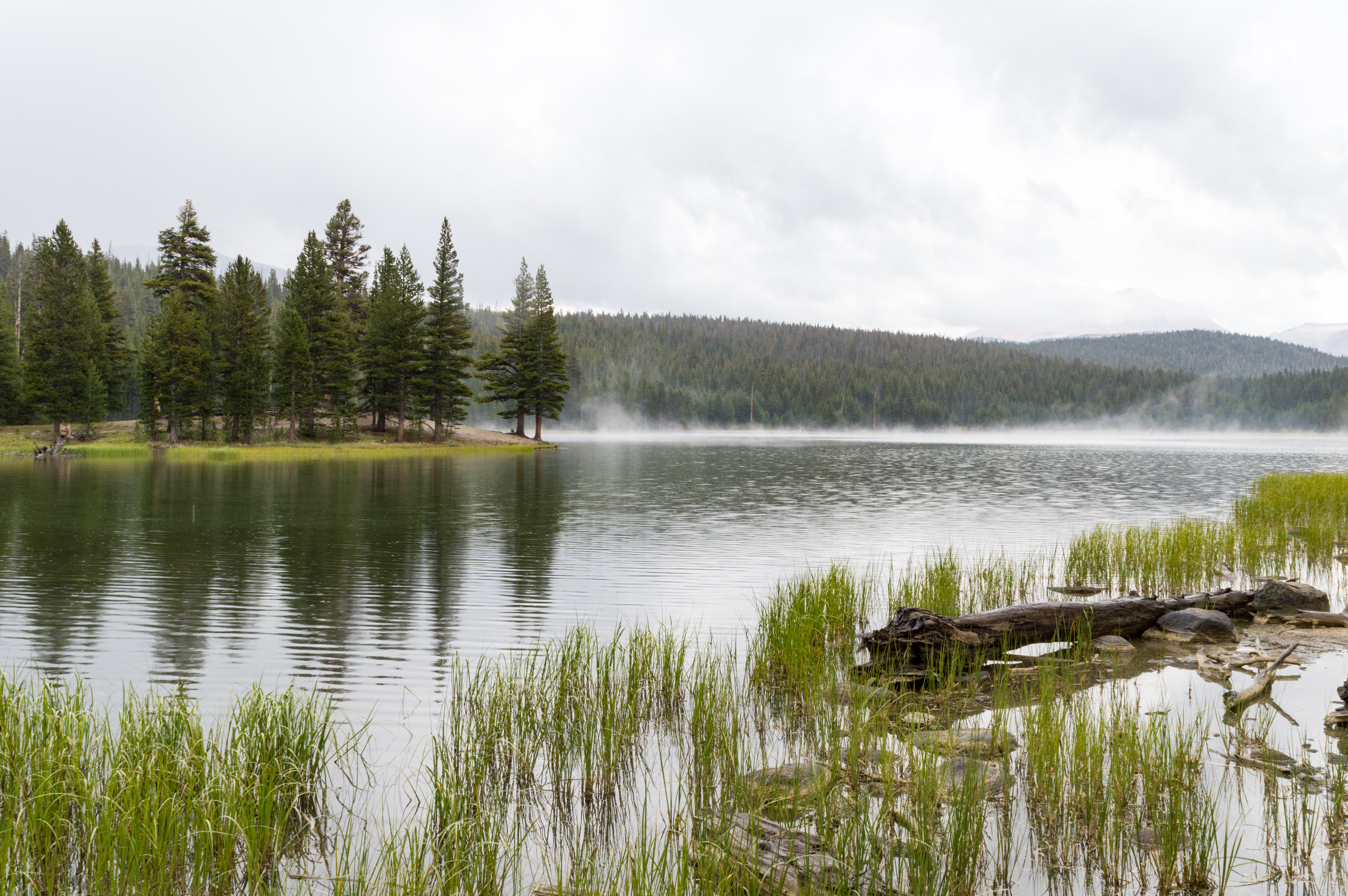
- Dog Lake in 2015

- Location within California
- Location: Tuolumne County, California
- Coordinates: 37.8911484°N 119.3397255°W
- Basin countries: United States
- Surface elevation: 9,180 ft (2,800 m)

Dog Lake is a lake in Yosemite National Park. It is a shallow but very cold lake, which is good for water sports. It is near to Dog Dome, is north, of Lembert Dome, and south, of Ragged Peak.

== See also ==
- List of lakes in California
