= Gülnur Tumbat =

Turkish female academic in marketing (born 1975)

Personal information
- Nationality: Turkish, American
- Born: 1975 (age 50–51) Denizli, Turkey
- Occupations: Mountaineering, Ultrarunning

Climbing career
- Major ascents: K2(8,611 m), Mount Everest (8,848 m), Aconcagua (6,959 m), McKinley (6,194 m), Kilimanjaro (5,895 m), Elbrus (5,642 m), Carstensz Pyramid(Punjak Jaya) (4,884 m), Grand Teton (4,199 m), Mount Vinson (4,892 m), Mont Blanc (4,805 m), Gran Paradiso (4,061 m)

Gülnur Tumbat (born 1975) is a Turkish female academic in marketing as well as amateur mountaineer and ultramarathon runner. Currently, she lives in San Francisco, California.

== Early years ==
Gülnur Tumbat was born to a teacher father and a seamstress mother as the youngest of three daughters in Denizli in 1975. After finishing high school, she studied Environmental Engineering at the Middle East Technical University (METU) in Ankara with a master's degree in the same field. She further received a master's degree in Business Administration from Bilkent University. Then, Tumbat obtained a PhD degree in marketing in the United States.

Since 2005, she has been serving as a professor in the Marketing Faculty at San Francisco State University.

== Sports ==
=== Mountain climbing ===
Tumbat began mountain climbing at age 17 in the Mountaineering & Winter Sports Club of the METU. She was on the top of more than 30 high-elevation mountains in Turkey, Russia, Georgia, Nepal, Argentina, and the US so far. Her doctoral thesis was on the subject of marketing and consuming risk. To study the subject, she joined a group of mountain climbers at the base camp at Mount Everest in 2004.

Gülnur Tumbat climbed Denali (6,194 m), Aconcagua (6,959 m), Kilimanjaro (5,895 m), Elbrus (5,642 m), and Carstensz Pyramid (Puncak Jaya) (4,884 m). She notes that her most challenging ascent was to Aconcagua, the highest point in South America, where she climbed solo and without the assistance of a professional mountain guide or a team.

In April 2014, her attempt to climb Mount Everest failed as the ascent to the summit was officially barred after a major avalanche killed more than ten mountaineers at 5,800 m elevation. She was not hurt by the accident. In July 2015, she ascended Carstensz Pyramid (4,884 m), completing her fifth summit of the "Eight Highest Peaks", in a group of six mountaineers from South Korea, Australia, France and Sweden.

On May 21, 2018, she became the first Turkish woman to summit Mount Everest from the Nepal side, known in Nepali as Sagarmāthā and in Tibetan as Chomolungma, the Earth's highest mountain. In December 2023, she completed 7th of the 7 summits, by climbing Mount Vinson, Antarctica's highest.

The first Turkish seven summiteer is Nasuh Mahruki although he did not climb Carstensz Pyramid (4,884 m) which is the highest mountain of Oceania, but climbed Mount Kosciuszko (2,228 m) in Australia.

On August 11, 2025, at 4 PM Pakistani time, Gülnur Tumbat became the first Turkish woman to summit K2, the world's second-highest and notoriously difficult peak also known as the "Savage Mountain".

=== Endurance sports ===
Tumbat has done some triathlons such as Marin County Triathlon and Alcatraz Triathlon. She has also been taking part in multiple adventure races such as Gold Rush 30-hour Adventure Racing and ultramarathon competitions in California, where she lives. Her achievements are:

Year	Place	Event	Distance	Rank		
Year	Place	Event	Distance	Overall	Female	Age group
2010	Angel Island, CA	Ayala Cove 10 Miles	10 mi	7	4	
2010	San Francisco, CA	North Face Endurance Challenge - California Trail	26,2 mi	21	3	
2011	San Francisco, CA	North Face Endurance Challenge - California Trail	50 mi	127	21	4
2012	San Francisco, CA	North Face Endurance Challenge - California Trail	50 mi	131	27	9
2013	Sausalito, CA	Rodeo Valley 50 km Trail Run	50 km	31	7	2
2013	Stinson Beach, CA	Miwok 60k Trail race	60 km	92	16	7
2013	Santa Barbara, CA	Santa Barbara 100	100 km	2	1	
2013	Castro Valley, CA	Lake Chabot 50 km Trail Run	50 km	14	1	1
2013	San Francisco, CA	North Face Endurance Challenge - California Trail	50 mi	163	31	10
2014	San Francisco, CA	North Face Endurance Challenge - California Trail	50 mi	220	36	6
