= Puppy Dome =

Granite dome in Yosemite National Park, USA

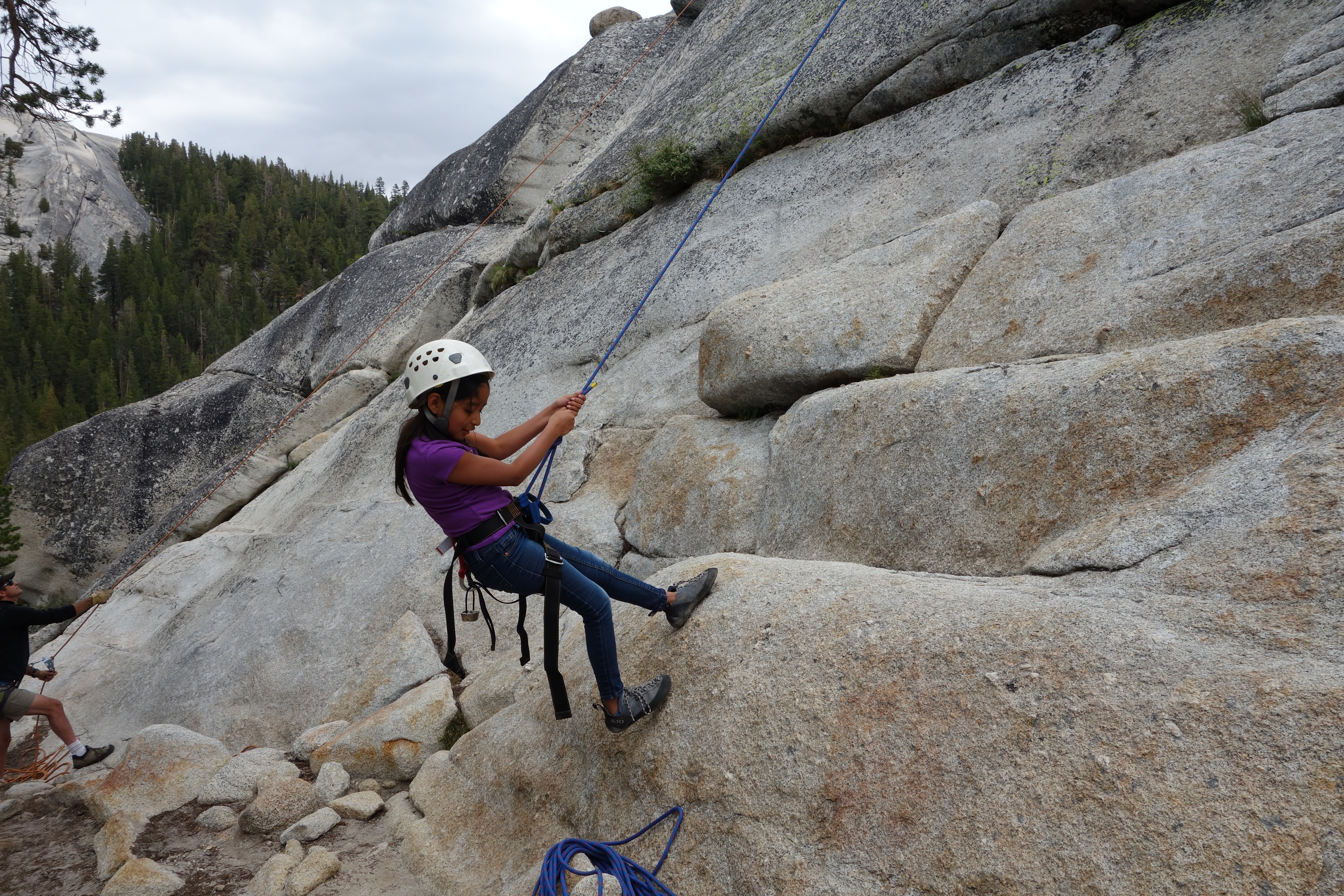
- A girl descends Puppy Dome.

Highest point
- Elevation: 8,760 ft (2,670 m) NAVD 88
- Prominence: 80 ft (24 m)
- Coordinates: 37°52′31″N 119°20′44″W

Geography
- Location within California Location within the United States
- Location: Yosemite National Park, Tuolumne County, California, U.S.
- Parent range: Sierra Nevada
- Topo map: USGS

Puppy Dome is a granite dome in Tuolumne Meadows, Yosemite National Park, California.

== Setting ==
Puppy Dome is south of Lembert Dome, and southwest of Moraine Flat. Puppy Dome is across from Lembert Dome. Near the base of Puppy Dome is Puppy Dome Falls, on the Dana Fork of the Tuolumne River. The top of Puppy Dome has a view of Tuolumne Meadows, Tioga Pass, Mount Dana, Cathedral Peak, and Lembert Dome.

Puppy Dome is one of the smallest domes in Yosemite National Park, next to much larger Lembert Dome.

Puppy Dome is close to Tuolumne Meadows's road and parking lot, with a 5-minute approach. Puppy Dome may be climbed by walking the moderately-angled rock slabs of the east face.

== Rock climbing ==
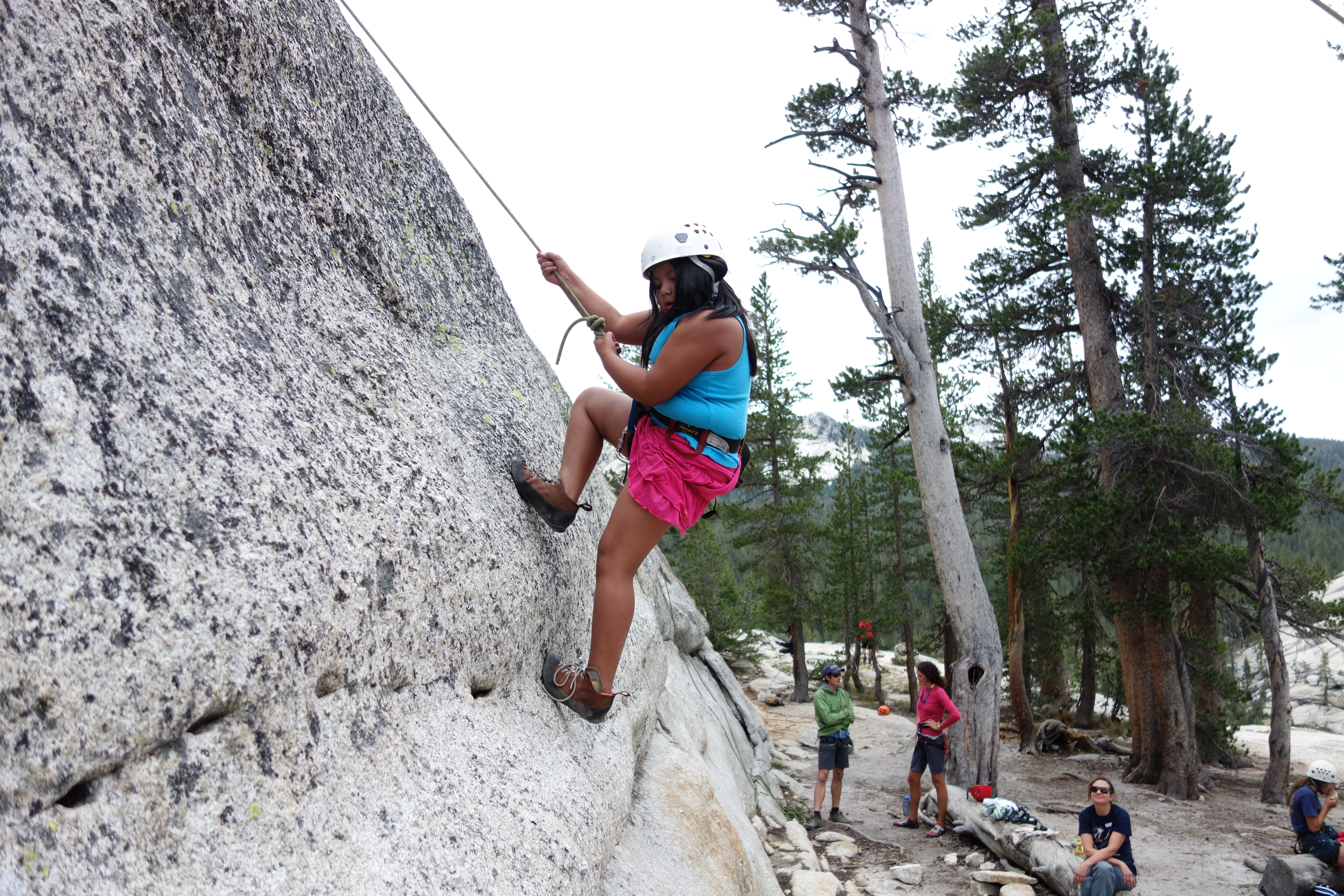
Rock climbing on Puppy Dome

Some beginner routes are on the easier low angled face, and several harder routes are around the far side of the dome; there is an overhanging face.

== External links and references ==
- peakbagger.com on Puppy Dome
- A map
- Google map
