= Dozier Dome =

Granite dome in Yosemite National Park, USA

- Location within California Location within the United States

Highest point
- Elevation: 9,340 ft (2,850 m) NAVD 88
- Prominence: 40 ft (12 m) NAVD 88
- Coordinates: 37.848°N 119.429°W

Geography
- Location: Yosemite National Park, U.S.
- Parent range: Sierra Nevada

Dozier Dome is a granite dome, in the Tuolumne Meadows region of Yosemite National Park. It is named after Jeff Dozier.

== Finding Dozier Dome ==
From the road, it is scarcely visible, rarely visited due to the unmarked approach, and no trails leading to its base. It between Medlicott Dome and Pywiack Domes.

From Highway 120, Dozier Dome is the lesser altitude, seen to the right of Medlicott.

== Climbing and hiking ==
Dozier Dome is one of the safest bolted areas of Tuolumne Meadows. On the other hand, the slope is class 3 considered challenging for hiking.

== External links and references ==
- The approach to Dozier Dome
- More on the approach
- On the rock climbing
