= Jeff Dozier =

American researcher and academic

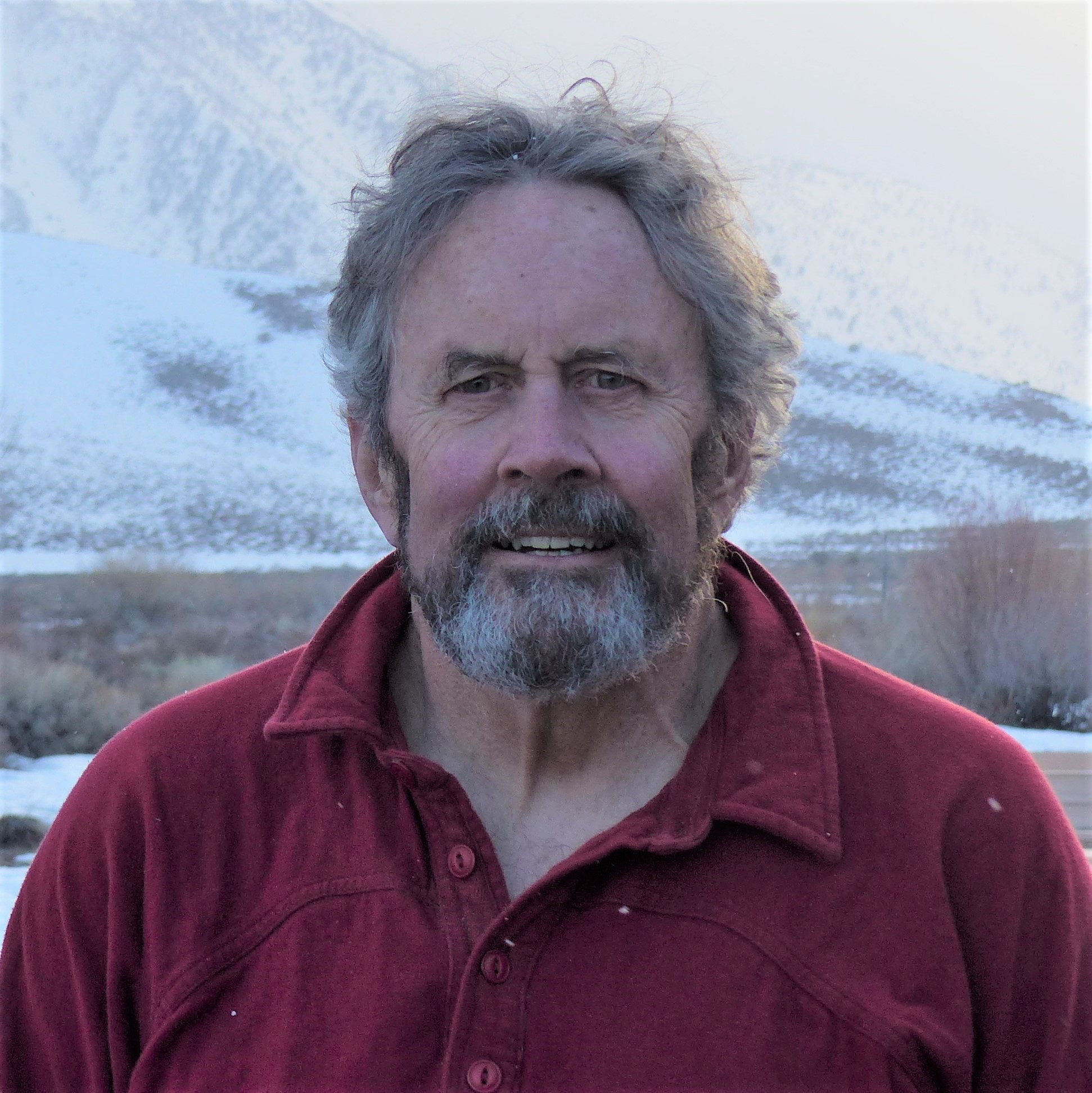
- Born: August 14, 1944 (age 82); Stockton, California, US
- Died: November 17, 2024; Reno, Nevada, US (Resident of Mammoth Lakes, CA)
- Occupations: snow hydrologist, environmental scientist, researcher and academic

Academic background
- Education: B.A., Geography (1968); M.Sc., Geography (1969); Ph.D., Geography (1973)
- Alma mater: California State University, East Bay; University of Michigan
- Doctoral advisor: Samuel Outcalt
- Website: jeffdozier.com

Jeff Dozier was an American snow hydrologist, environmental scientist, researcher and academic. He was distinguished professor emeritus and founding dean of the Bren School of Environmental Science & Management at the University of California, Santa Barbara.

Dozier's research and teaching focused on snow science, Earth system science, radiative transfer in snow, remote sensing and information systems, image processing, and terrain analysis.

Dozier was a fellow of the American Geophysical Union and the American Association for the Advancement of Science, and a recipient of the NASA/Department of Interior William T. Pecora Award.

== Early life and education ==
While Dozier was at the University of California, Berkeley in the early 1960s, he dropped out after a year and a half and went to Europe where he climbed, and studied German. He then hitchhiked from Germany to India. His experience during this trip inclined him to learn more about Earth's water and climate. He received his B.A. in Geography from California State University, Hayward (now East Bay) in 1968.

Dozier completed the M.Sc. in 1969 and Ph.D. in 1973 in Geography from the University of Michigan. His PhD thesis topic was the hydrology of the Dana fork of the Tuolumne River. In 1971, he joined California State University, Hayward as a lecturer and taught there until he moved to the University of California, Santa Barbara in 1974.

In 1974, Dozier went to the Hindu Kush for his sixth climbing expedition. While crossing a steep slope, Dozier realized that he had no idea whether that slope might avalanche. That experience moved his research interest towards snow and avalanches.

== Career ==
In 1974, Dozier joined University of California, Santa Barbara. He worked as a senior member of the technical staff and the project scientist for a potential spectroscopy space mission at NASA's Jet Propulsion Laboratory. From 1990 to 1992 he worked at the NASA Goddard Space Flight Center as the senior project scientist at the start of NASA's Earth Observing System, when its configuration was established.

In 1994, Dozier founded the Bren School at UCSB and took on the position of its Dean until 2000. He led six expeditions to the Hindu Kush range in Afghanistan, and had a climbing destination, Dozier Dome, in Yosemite National Park named after him.

Dozier helped explain optical properties of snow to animators of the film Frozen.

== Research and work ==
Dozier's research included studies of snow hydrology as well as conception and implementation of remote sensing and information management systems. He led interdisciplinary studies in three areas: snow hydrology and biogeochemistry in the mountain environment and its extension to groundwater management in the surrounding lowlands; hydrologic science, environmental engineering, and social science in the water environment; and the integration of environmental science and remote sensing with computer science and technology.

In 1980, he spent a year working for NOAA's National Environmental Satellite, Data, and Information Service in Maryland. There, he and Michael Matson observed tiny bright spots on a satellite image of the Persian Gulf. The image had been captured by the Advanced Very High Resolution Radiometer (AVHRR) instrument on the NOAA-6 satellite, and the spots, they discovered, were campfire-sized flares caused by the burning of methane escaping from oil wells. It marked the first time that such a small fire had been seen from space. He and Matson were intrigued by the possibilities, and Dozier developed a mathematical method to identify small fires in pixels a kilometer in size. This method, published in 1981, became the foundation for nearly all subsequent satellite fire-detection algorithms.

== Awards and honors ==
- 1991 - Fellow, American Geophysical Union
- 1999 - Fellow, American Association for the Advancement of Science
- 2005 - William T. Pecora Award, Department of Interior and NASA
- 2009 - Jim Gray eScience Award, Microsoft Research
- 2018 - 13th Jeremy Grantham Lecturer, Indian Institute of Science

== Selected articles ==
- Dozier, J. (1981). "A method for satellite identification of surface temperature fields of subpixel resolution". Remote Sensing of Environment. 11: 221–229. Bibcode:1981RSEnv..11..221D. doi:10.1016/0034-4257(81)90021-3.
- Dozier, J.; Warren, S. G. (1982). "Effect of viewing angle on the infrared brightness temperature of snow". Water Resources Research. 18 (5): 1424–1434. Bibcode:1982WRR....18.1424D. doi:10.1029/WR018i005p01424.
- Dozier, J.; Frew, J. (1990). "Rapid calculation of terrain parameters for radiation modeling from digital elevation data". IEEE Transactions on Geoscience and Remote Sensing. 28 (5): 963–969. Bibcode:1990ITGRS..28..963D. doi:10.1109/36.58986.
- Wan, Z.; Dozier, J. (1996). "A generalized split-window algorithm for retrieving land-surface temperature from space". IEEE Transactions on Geoscience and Remote Sensing. 34 (4): 892–905. Bibcode:1996ITGRS..34..892W. doi:10.1109/36.508406.
- Marks, D.; Dozier, J. (1992). "Climate and energy exchange at the snow surface in the alpine region of the Sierra Nevada, 2, Snow cover energy balance". Water Resources Research. 28 (11): 3043–3054. Bibcode:1992WRR....28.3043M. doi:10.1029/92WR01483.
- Dozier, J.; Green, R. O.; Nolin, A. W.; Painter, T. H. (2009). "Interpretation of snow properties from imaging spectrometry". Remote Sensing of Environment. 113: S25–S37. Bibcode:2009RSEnv.113S..25D. doi:10.1016/j.rse.2007.07.029.
