= Lamb Dome =

Granite dome in Yosemite National Park, USA

- Location within California Location within the United States

Highest point
- Elevation: 9,205 ft (2,806 m) NAVD 88
- Prominence: 385 ft (117 m)
- Coordinates: 37°52′N 119°25′W

Geography
- Location: Yosemite National Park, Tuolumne County, California, U.S.
- Parent range: Ritter Range, Sierra Nevada

Lamb Dome Dome is a granite dome, in the Tuolumne Meadows area of Yosemite National Park. It is one of the smaller domes.

Lamb Dome and Drug Dome are two of the more obscure domes in Tuolumne Meadows, despite their being close to the road. They are just west of the popular Daff Dome and Fairview Domes. Lamb and Drug Dome are side by side.

== On Lamb Dome Dome's particulars ==
Both Lamb and Drug Domes offer about a half dozen rock climbing routes. Most of the climbing on Lamb Dome is on its northwest face.
