= Stately Pleasure Dome =

Granite dome in Yosemite National Park, USA

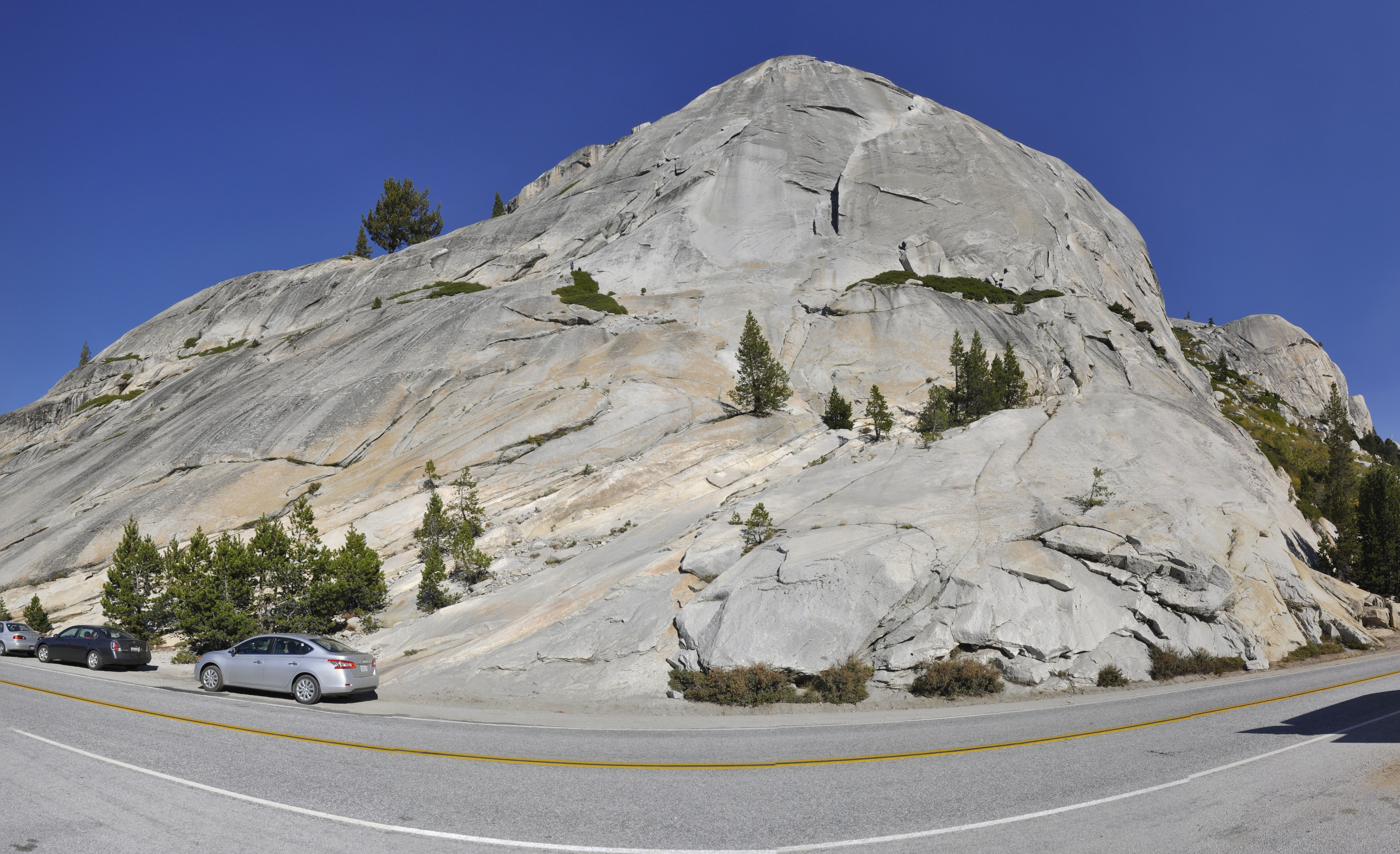
- Stately Pleasure Dome from the South

Highest point
- Elevation: 9,065 ± 20 ft (2,763.0 ± 6.1 m) NAVD 88
- Prominence: 0 ft (0 m)
- Parent peak: Polly Dome
- Coordinates: 37°50′19″N 119°27′28″W

Geography
- Location within California Location within the United States
- Location: Yosemite National Park, Tuolumne County, California, U.S.
- Parent range: Sierra Nevada
- Topo map: USGS Tenaya Lake

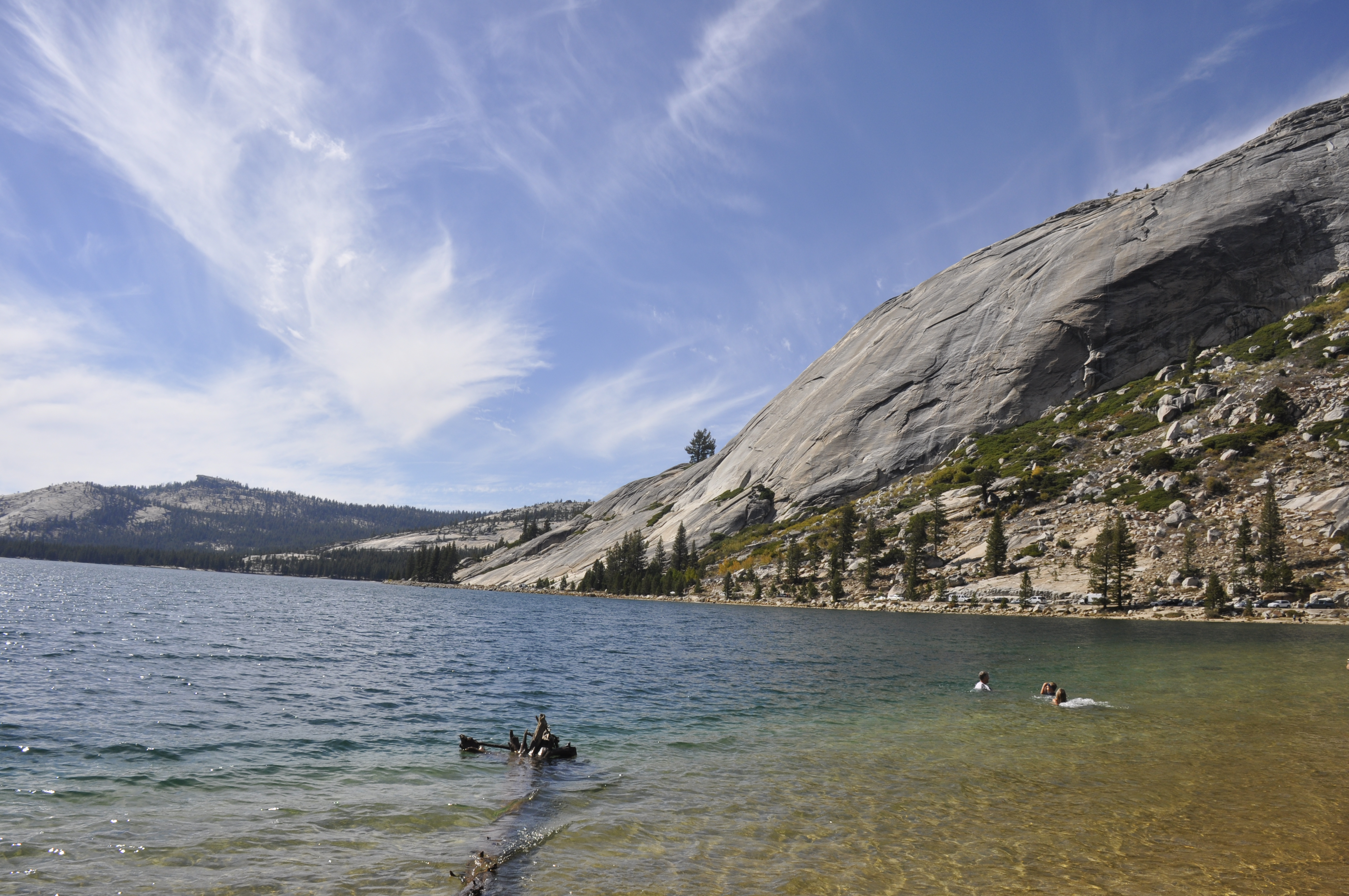
Stately Pleasure Dome viewed from the East from the shores of Tenaya Lake.

Stately Pleasure Dome is the unofficial name for the prominent south-southwestern portion of Polly Dome, a granite dome on the northwest side of Tenaya Lake and Tioga Road in the Yosemite high country. Stately Pleasure Dome consists of glaciated and exfoliated granite rock that rises steeply 900 feet (270 m) from the lake shore; the very steep east side of the dome is popular with rock climbers, who gave the dome its name.

The phrase "stately pleasure dome" is in reference to the poem Kubla Khan by Samuel Taylor Coleridge:

In Xanadu did Kubla Khan
A stately pleasure-dome decree:
Where Alph, the sacred river, ran
Through caverns measureless to man
Down to a sunless sea.
(emphasis added)

== Climbing ==
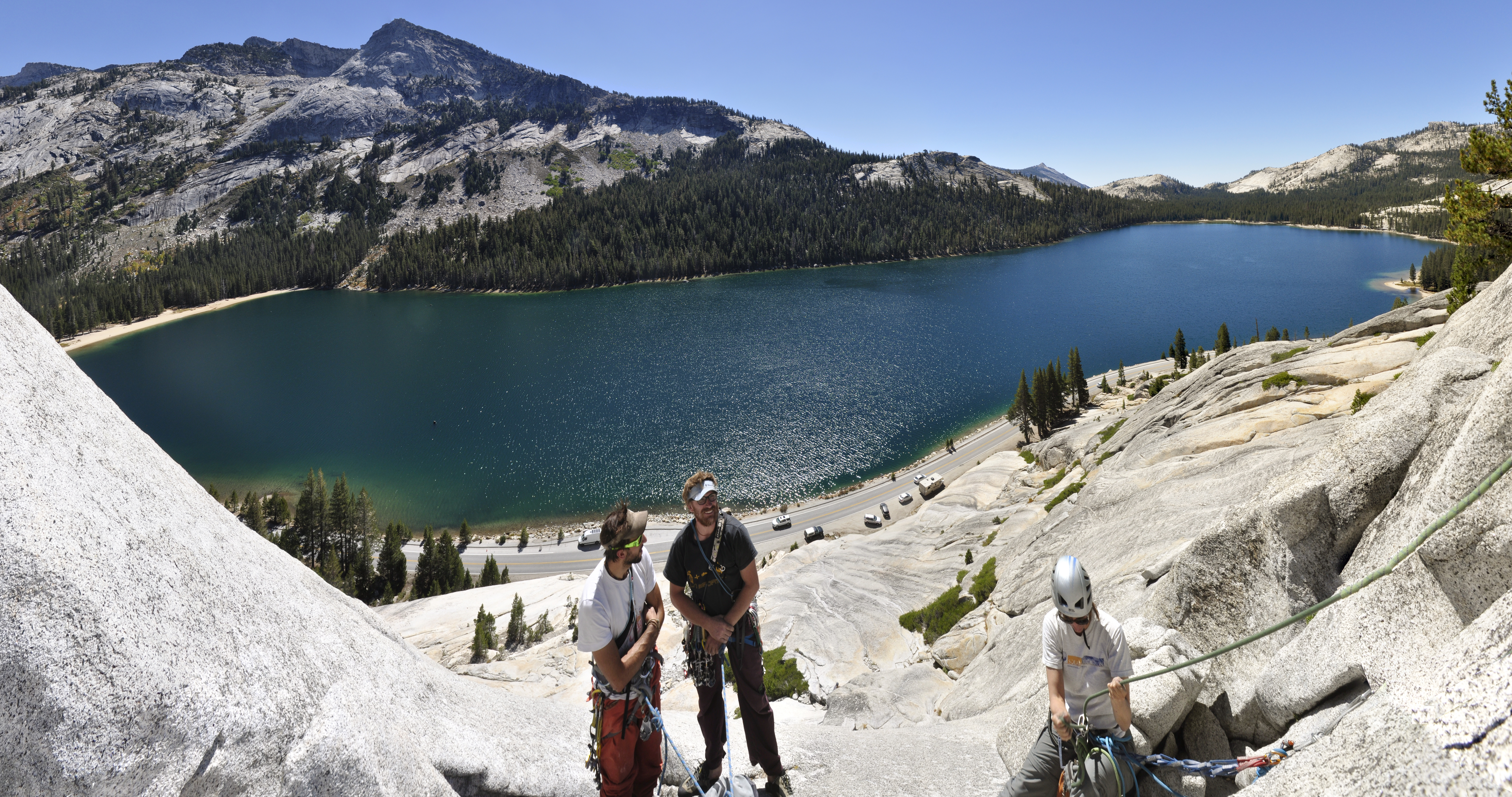
Tenaya Lake and climbers on Stately Pleasure Dome

The south face of the formation is popular with rock climbers and has over twenty multi-pitch slab climbs many of them easy or moderate.
