= Doda Dome =

Granite dome in Yosemite National Park, USA

- Location within California Location within the United States

Highest point
- Elevation: 8,906 ft (2,715 m) NAVD 88
- Prominence: 266 ft (81 m)
- Coordinates: 37°53′N 119°25′W

Geography
- Location: Yosemite National Park, Tuolumne County, California, U.S.
- Parent range: Ritter Range, Sierra Nevada

Doda Dome is the unofficial name of a granite dome west of the Tuolumne Meadows area of Yosemite National Park, to the northeast of Tenaya Lake in Tuolumne County, California, U.S. It is a high dome, just northwest of Daff Dome, and may be identified by its mammalian appearance. It is named after Carol Doda, a famous Bay Area stripper.

It is a target of rock climbers, with a variety of routes given breast-related names such as "Tittely Winks" and "Bust It Out".
