= Dog Dome =

Granite dome in Yosemite National Park, USA

- Location within California Location within the United States

Highest point
- Elevation: 9,400 ft (2,900 m) NAVD 88
- Prominence: 80 ft (24 m)
- Coordinates: 37°53′N 119°21′W

Geography
- Location: Yosemite National Park, Tuolumne County, California, U.S.
- Parent range: Ritter Range, Sierra Nevada

Dog Dome is a granite dome in the Tuolumne Meadows area of Yosemite National Park. Dog Dome is quite near Lembert Dome, which is just northeast. Dog Dome is also near to Dog Lake.

Dog Dome offers nearly the same views as from atop Lembert Dome, but the 5 miles (8.0 km) round-trip hike leads to far smaller crowds, plus, the climb to the top is 150 feet (46 m) feet shorter.

Only from a certain angle is Dog Dome domelike in appearance; it has a gentle slope on one side, and a sharp slope on the other. See roche moutonnée.

== On Dog Dome's particulars ==
Dog Dome is a target of rock climbers, and has a variety of routes.

== External links and reference ==
- A topographic map of Dog Dome's area
