= Young Lakes =

Three lakes in Yosemite National Park, USA

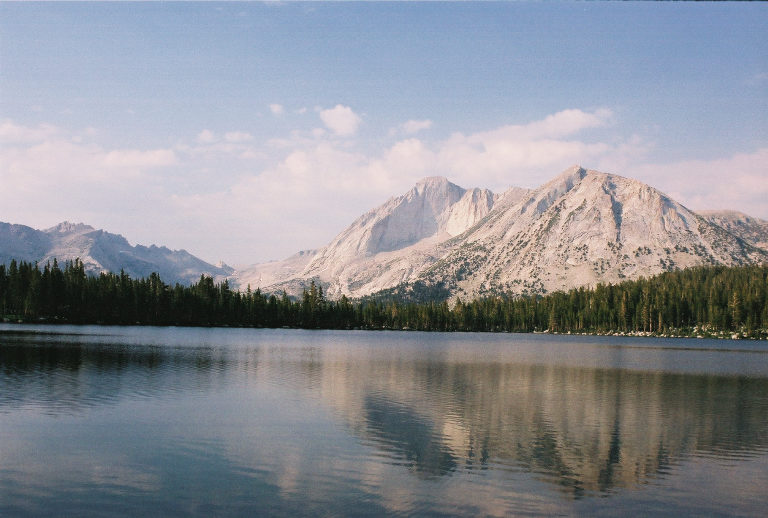
- Lower Young Lake, Yosemite National Park

- Location within California Location within the United States
- Location: Yosemite National Park
- Coordinates: 37.897851°N 119.347476°W

Young Lakes are three lakes, north of Tuolumne Meadows, in Yosemite National Park, California.

== Important facts ==
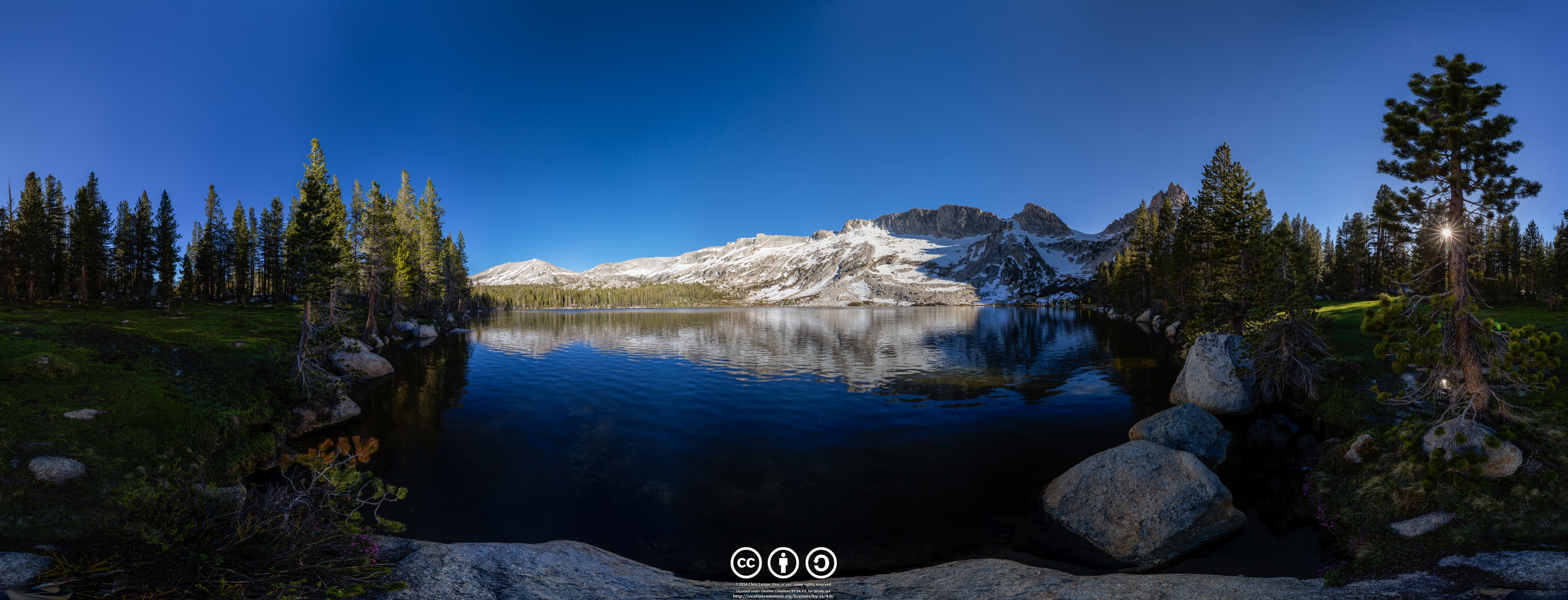
Lower Young Lake Panorama

The trailhead is in Tuolumne Meadows, at elevation 8,584 feet (2,616 m). The highest point on the trail is 9,973 feet (3,040 m), and the elevation of Lower Young Lake is 9,880 feet (3,010 m). The elevation gain is 1,389 feet (423 m). The hiking distance is 6.4 miles (10.3 km).

There are campsites at: North side of Lower, Middle Lakes, and northwest side of upper lake. Activities include fishing, photography, cross-country explorations, and peak climbing.

The lakes are located between Ragged Peak and White Mountain. Other nearby peaks are Sheep Peak, North Peak, and Mount Conness, and the trail provides great views of countless more distant summits to the south, of the Cathedral Range.
