= Polly Dome =

Granite dome in Yosemite National Park, USA

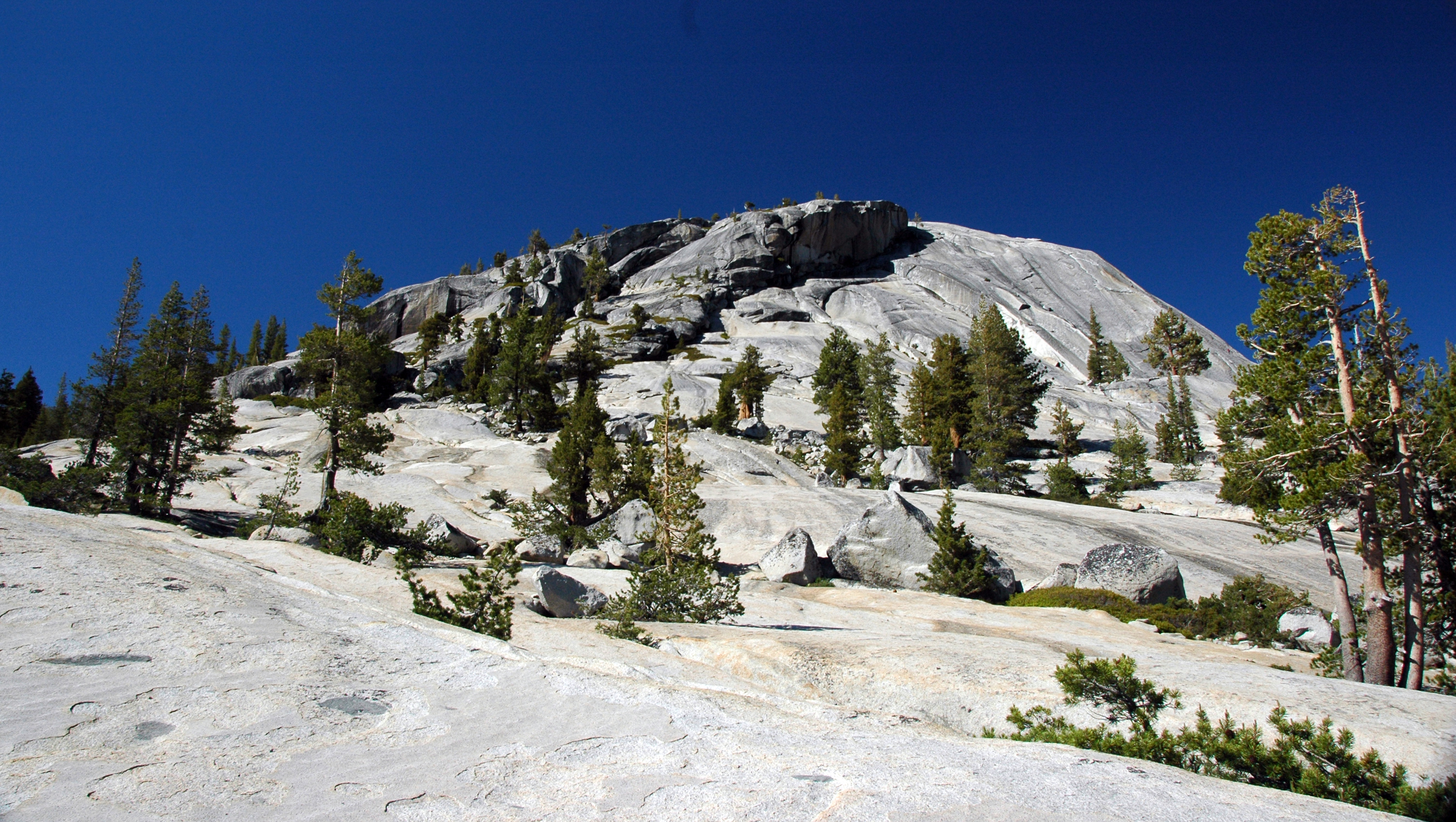
- Polly dome as seen from the trail

Highest point
- Elevation: 9,806 ft (2,989 m) NAVD 88
- Prominence: 1,086 ft (331 m)
- Coordinates: 37°51′15″N 119°27′0″W

Geography
- Location within California Location within the United States
- Location: Yosemite National Park, Mariposa County, California, U.S.
- Parent range: Sierra Nevada
- Topo map: USGS Tenaya Lake

Polly Dome is a prominent granite dome rising 1,640 feet (500 m) above the northwest side of Tenaya Lake and Tioga Road in the Yosemite high country. The dome, more than 3 kilometers (~2 miles) long, is a substantially intact mass of granitic rock that has withstood heavy glaciation and exfoliation. Forest clings to the less-steep parts of its north and west slopes. The southwest end of Polly Dome consists of the Stately Pleasure Dome, 740 feet (230 m) lower than Polly Dome, but rising very steeply 900 feet (270 m) from the shore of the lake. Polly Dome's summit has unobstructed views east to the Cathedral Range, north over Tuolumne Meadows to the Sierra crest, northwest over the Grand Canyon of the Tuolumne and southwest to Half Dome.

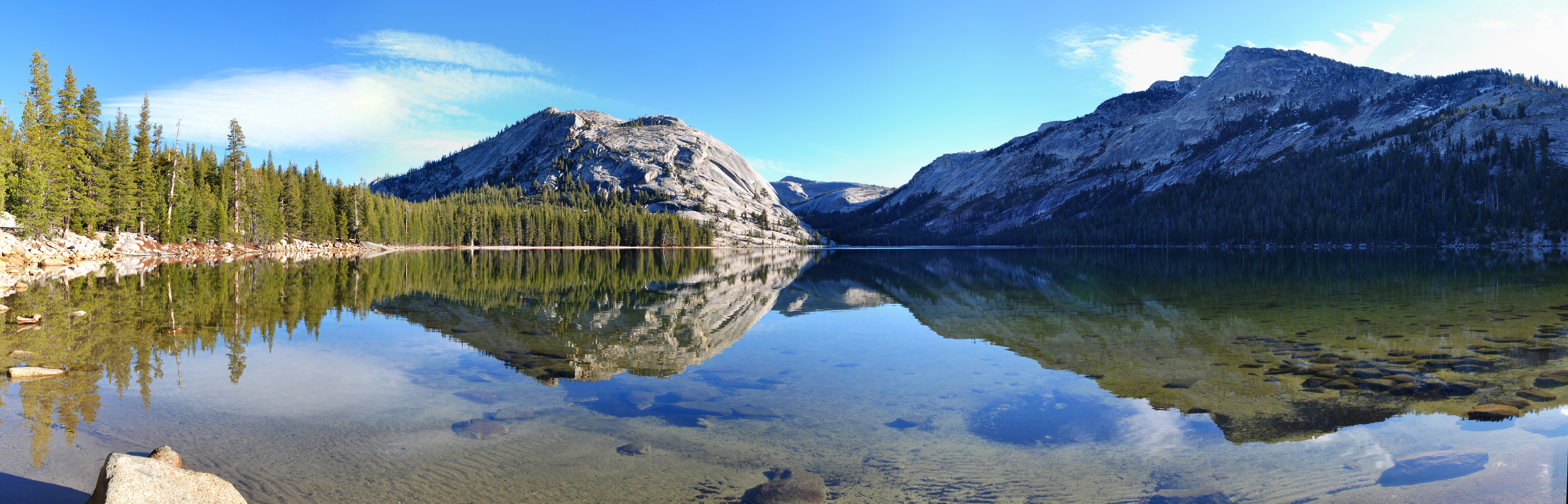
Panorama at Tenaya Lake Polly Dome with its southwestern peak called Stately Pleasure Dome is prominent center-left
