= West Cottage Dome =

Granite dome in Yosemite National Park, USA

- Location within California Location within the United States

Highest point
- Elevation: 9,040 ft (2,760 m) NAVD 88
- Prominence: 40 ft (12 m)
- Coordinates: 37°53′N 119°25′W

Geography
- Location: Yosemite National Park, Tuolumne County, California, U.S.
- Parent range: Ritter Range, Sierra Nevada

West Cottage Dome is a granite dome in the Tuolumne Meadows area of Yosemite National Park. West Cottage Dome is rarely visited, though it is the closest dome to Daff Dome.

== On West Cottage Dome's particulars ==
See also East Cottage Dome, which is quite close.

West Cottage Dome has a few rock climbing routes.
