= North face (Fairview Dome) =

Climbing route in Yosemite National Park, US

North face of Fairview Dome
- Regular route
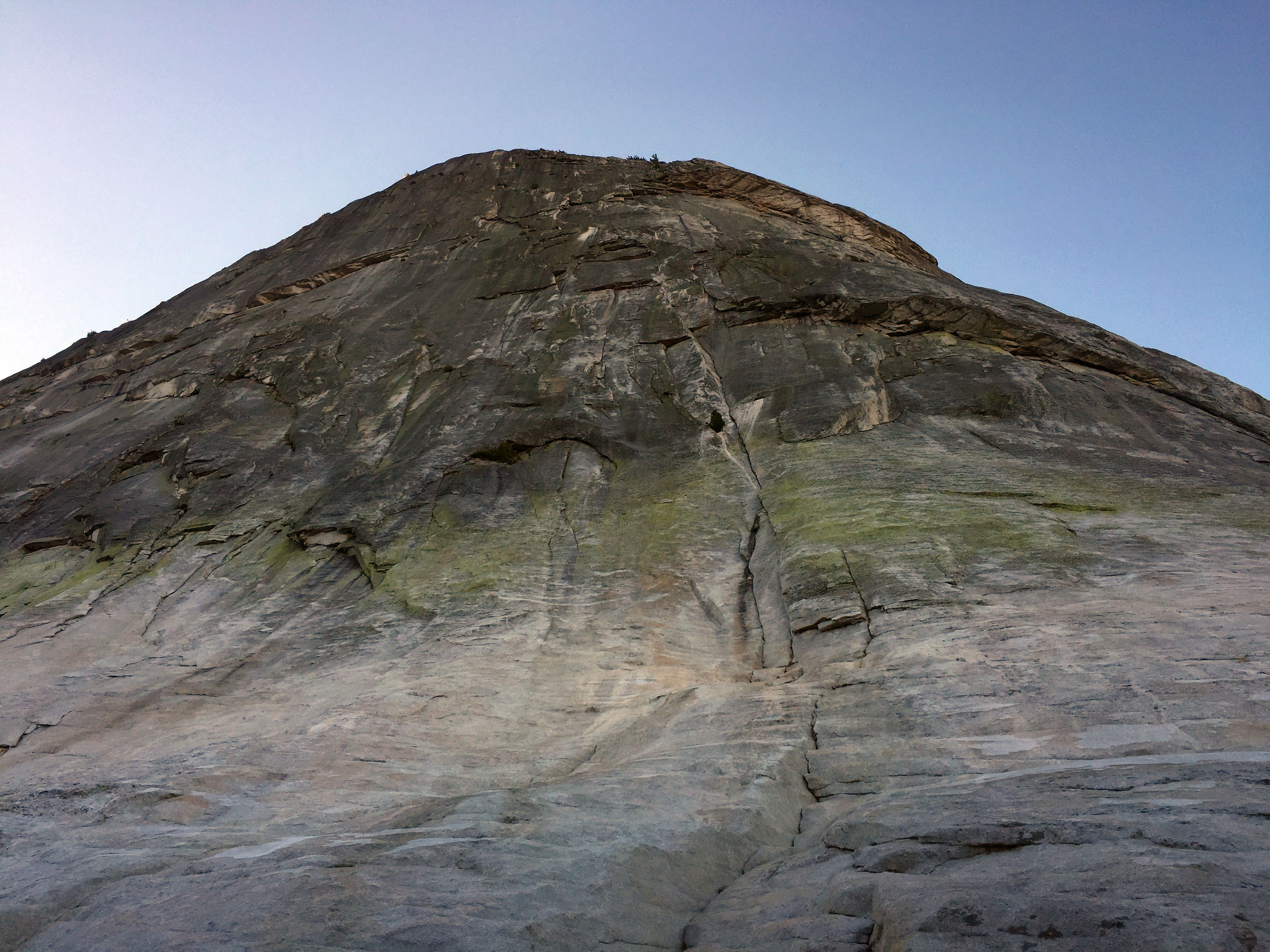
- Regular Route from the bottom
- Location: Yosemite, California, US
- Coordinates: 37°52′17″N 119°24′14″W
- Climbing area: Fairview Dome
- Route type: Trad
- Vertical gain: 1,000 feet
- Pitches: 12
- Technical grade: 5.9
- NCCS grade: III
- First ascent: Wally Reed & Chuck Pratt, 1958
- First free ascent: Steve Roper & Mark Powell, 1962

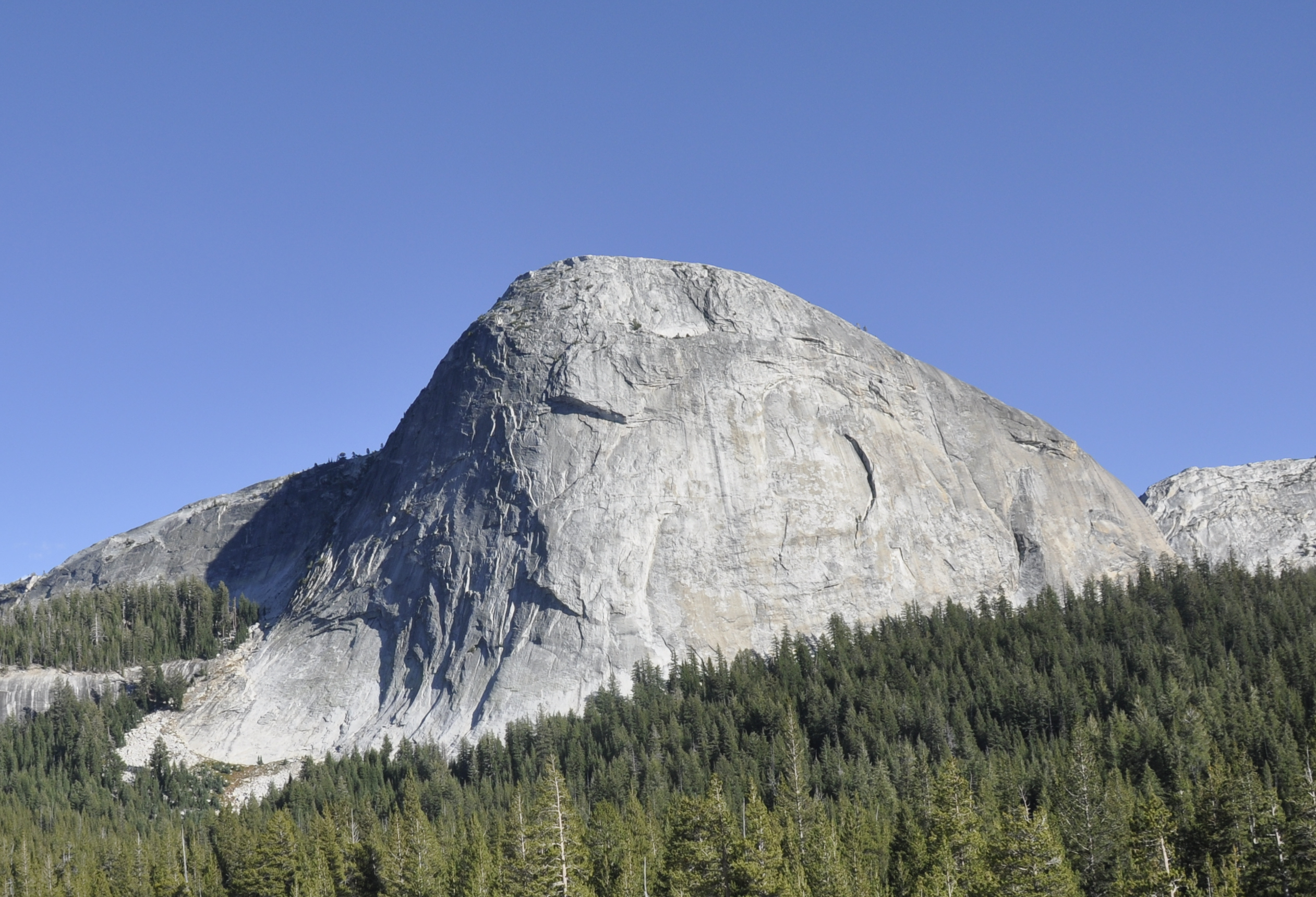
Regular Route can be seen in the center-left on the border between shade and light.

The North Face of Fairview Dome also known as the Regular Route of Fairview Dome is a technical rock climbing route in Tuolumne Meadows of Yosemite National Park. It is featured in Fifty Classic Climbs of North America.
