= Glaciated rock =

Rock that shows evidence of having been exposed to a glacier

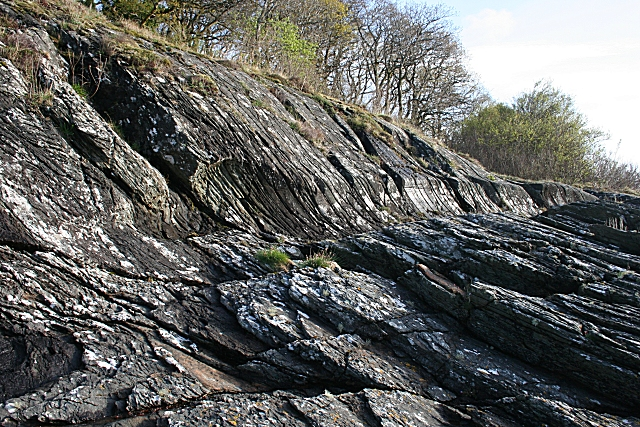
An example of a glaciated rock

A glaciated rock is a rock that shows evidence of having been exposed to a glacier. Generally it has striations or deep scratches, caused more by the debris being carried by the glacier than by the ice itself. Glaciated rocks may also be erratics – that is, not belonging to the local rocks but having been transported there by the glacier.

Where a present-day glacier is retreating, its former extent can be measured by distribution of the glaciated rocks. More significantly, glaciated rocks in any area mean that it has been under ice at some stage. Thus, they have produced evidence that Saudi Arabia was once covered by an ice sheet.
