= Lembert Dome =

Granite dome in Yosemite National Park, USA

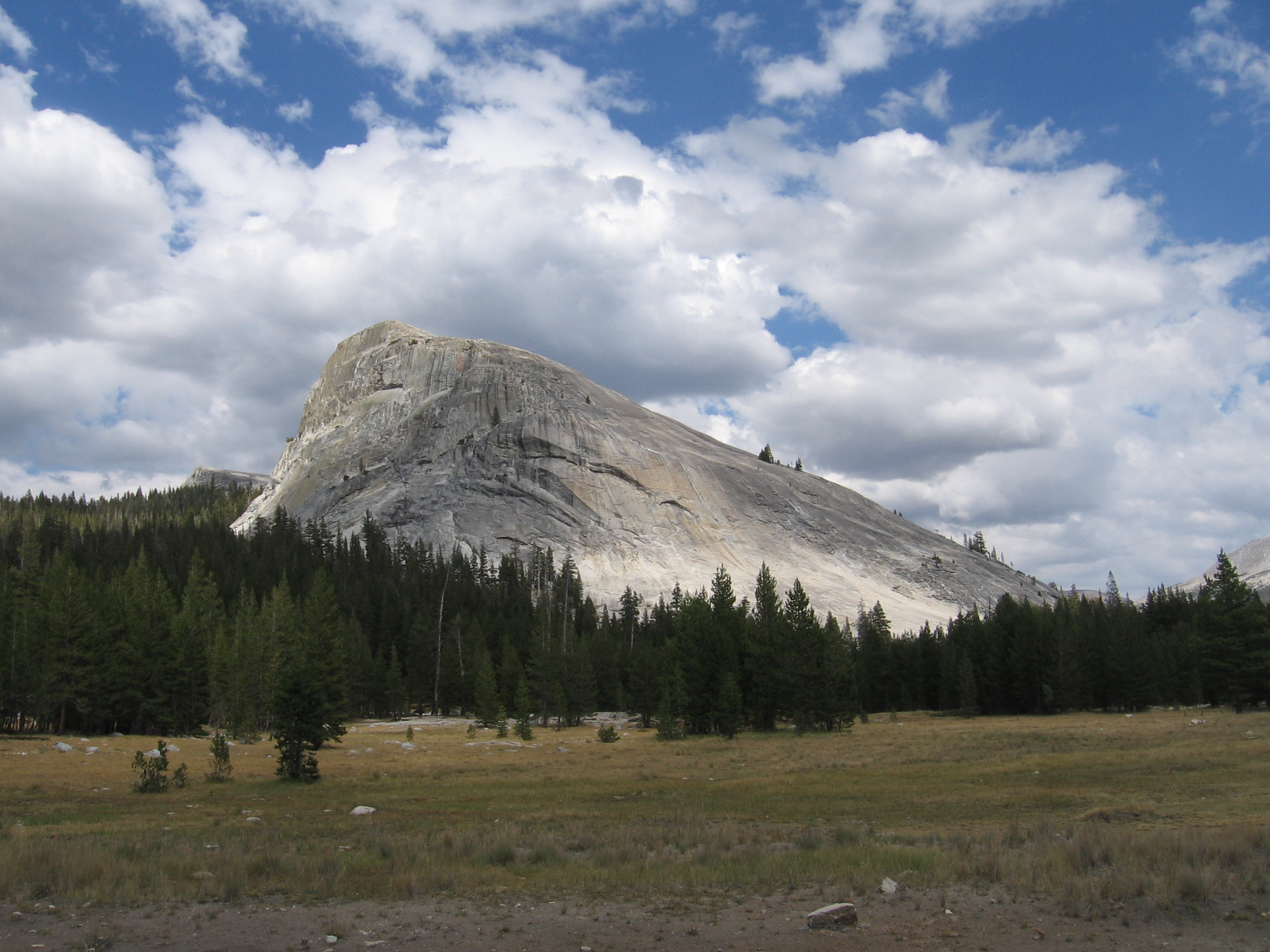
- Lembert Dome from Tuolumne Meadows

Highest point
- Elevation: 9,455 ft (2,882 m) NAVD 88
- Prominence: 290 ft (88 m)
- Coordinates: 37°52′55″N 119°20′49″W

Geography
- Location within California Location within the United States
- Location: Tuolumne County, California, U.S.
- Parent range: Sierra Nevada
- Topo map: USGS Tioga Pass

Geology
- Rock age: Cretaceous
- Mountain type: Granite dome

Climbing
- Easiest route: Hike, class 1

Lembert Dome is a granite dome rock formation in Yosemite National Park in the US state of California. The dome soars 800 feet (240 m) above Tuolumne Meadows and the Tuolumne River and can be hiked starting at the Tioga Road in the heart of Tuolumne Meadows, 8 miles (13 km) west of the Tioga Pass Entrance to Yosemite National Park. The landform is an example of a rôche moutonnée with clear lee and stoss slopes.

Lembert Dome was named for John Baptist Lembert, sometimes erroneously spelled Lambert, who took up a homestead in a section of Tuolumne Meadows in 1885. The Wheeler Survey referred to it as Soda Springs Dome, and John Muir called it Glacier Rock.

Lembert Dome is near Puppy Dome, and is also close to Dog Dome.

Rock climbers can scale the face from the parking lot just off the Tioga Road, but hikers can simply walk up the back side or take the challenging steeper trek up the face starting from just east of the parking lot. Many technical free climbing routes have been put up.

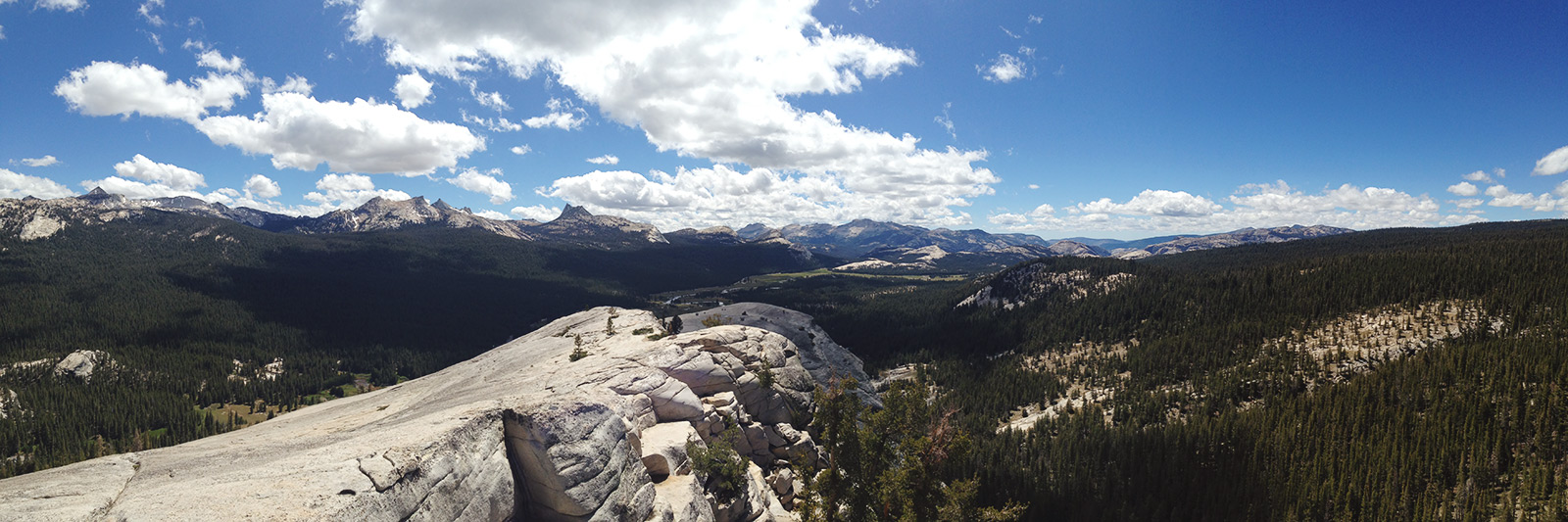
View from top of Lembert Dome, Tuolumne Meadows, Yosemite National Park, California. Unicorn peak and Cathedral Peak (California)
