= Fairview Dome =

Granite dome in Yosemite National Park, USA

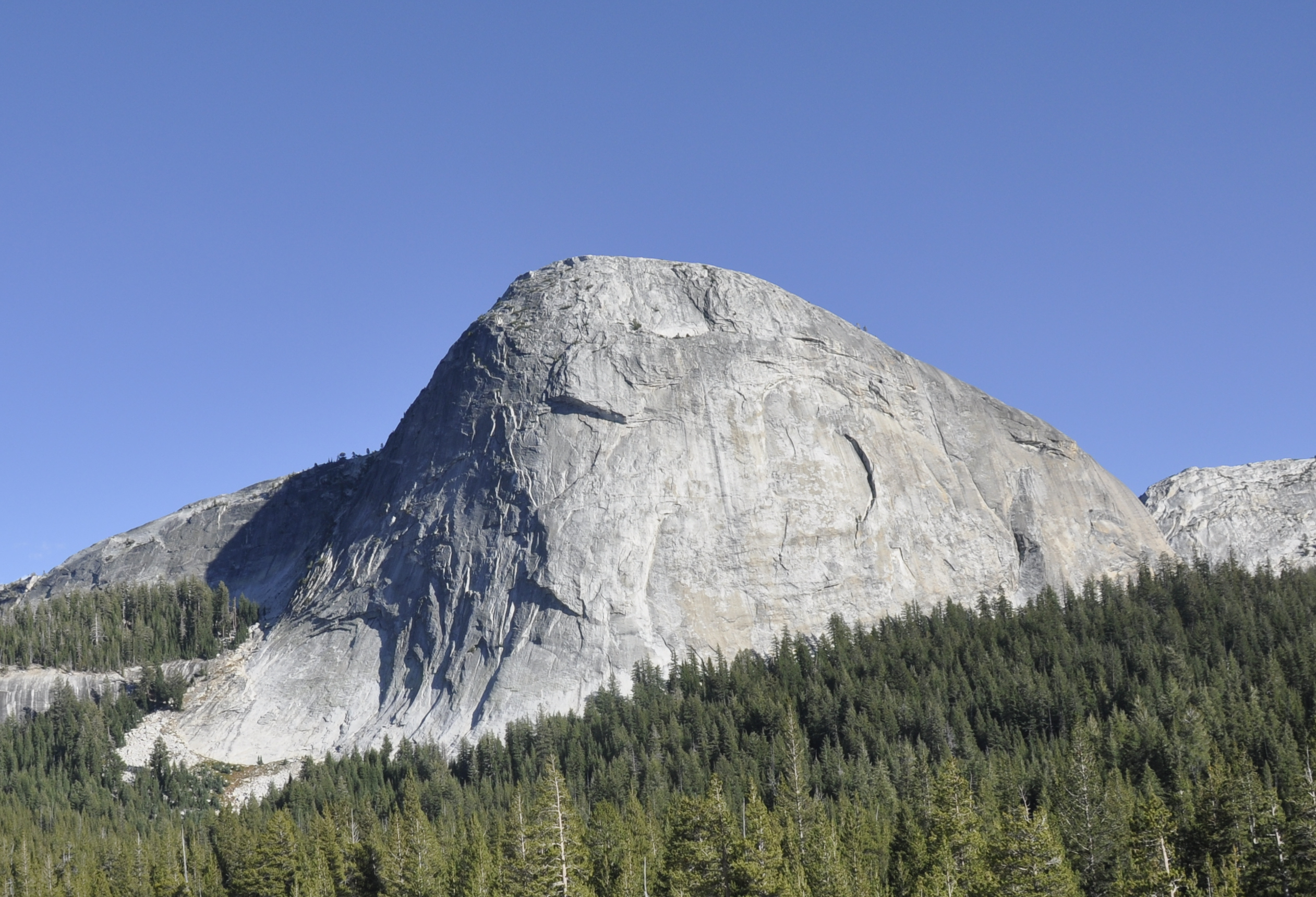
- North and west face of Fairview Dome from Daff Dome

Highest point
- Elevation: 9,728 ft (2,965 m) NAVD 88
- Prominence: 643 ft (196 m)
- Coordinates: 37°52′17″N 119°24′14″W

Geography
- Location within California Location within the United States
- Location: Yosemite National Park, Tuolumne County, California, U.S.
- Parent range: Sierra Nevada
- Topo map: USGS Tenaya Lake

Climbing
- First ascent: July 4, 1863 by H. Brewer and C.F. Hoffmann
- Easiest route: East face, scramble class 3

Fairview Dome is a prominent granite dome in Yosemite National Park, located 1.8 miles (2.9 km) north of Cathedral Peak and 4 miles (6.4 km) west of Tuolumne Meadows. Near Fairview Dome is Marmot Dome, linked by an area called Razor Back. Northwest is Hammer Dome.

John Muir wrote of the peak:

One of the best general views of the brightest and best of the Yosemite park landscapes that every Yosemite tourist should see, is to be had from the top of Fairview Dome, a lofty conoidal rock near Cathedral Peak that long ago I named the Tuolumne Glacier Monument, one of the most striking and best preserved of the domes... The general view from the summit consists of a sublime assemblage of ice-born rocks and mountains, long wavering ridges, meadows, lakes, and forest-covered moraines, hundreds of square miles of them.

The north face route is popular with rock climbers and is listed in the classic guidebook Fifty Classic Climbs of North America. Routes vary in difficulty up to possibly class 5.11.

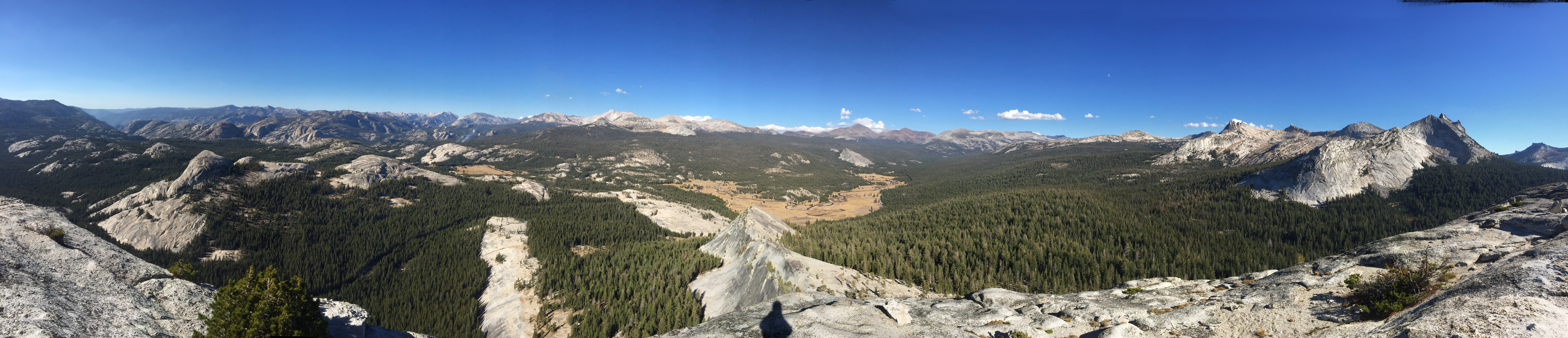
Daff Dome on the left, Tuolumne Meadows in the center and Cathedral Range in the right from the summit of Fairview Dome.
