= Daff Dome =

Granite dome in Yosemite National Park, USA

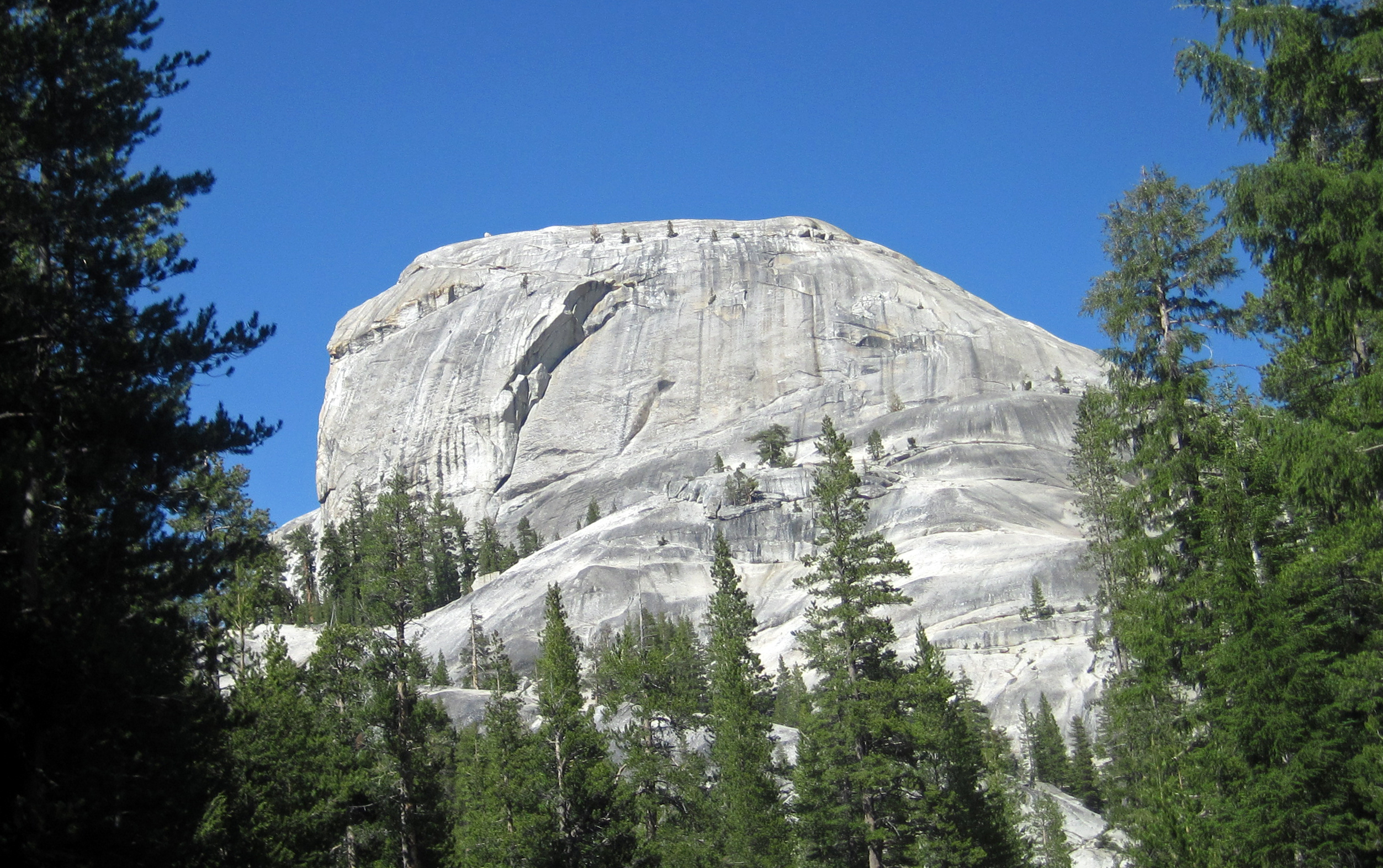
- Daff Dome

Highest point
- Elevation: 9,158 ft (2,791 m) NAVD 88
- Prominence: 514 ft (157 m)
- Coordinates: 37°52′51″N 119°24′46″W

Geography
- Location within California Location within the United States
- Location: Yosemite National Park; Tuolumne County, California, U.S.
- Parent range: Sierra Nevada
- Topo map: USGS Tenaya Lake

Climbing
- First ascent: West Crack by Frank Sacherer in June 1963
- Easiest route: East side, class 3-4 scramble

Daff Dome or DAFF Dome is a prominent 800 feet (243.8 m) granite dome in Yosemite National Park, 3 miles (4.8 km) west of Tuolumne Meadows and 1,700 feet (0.5 km) from the Tioga Road. It is southeast of Doda Dome, and is near both West Cottage Dome and East Cottage Dome; it is also near Lamb Dome. Since the dome was never officially named, the DAFF Dome name was adopted in the 1960s as an acronym of "Dome Across From Fairview" Dome.

== Climbing ==
The dome is popular with rock climbers and has several multi-pitch slab and crack climbs. Two of the earliest and best known are West Crack and Crescent Arch. West Crack, first climbed by Frank Sacherer in June 1963 is a 5 pitch YDS 5.9 which for 400 feet follows a continuous crack. Crescent Arch was first climbed with occasional aid by Layton Kor and Fred Beckey in June 1965, and first free climbed by Bob Kamps and TM Herbert soon after. The climb is a 6 pitch YDS 5.9+ (modern 5.10a) and ascends corner and crack system in a large open book.

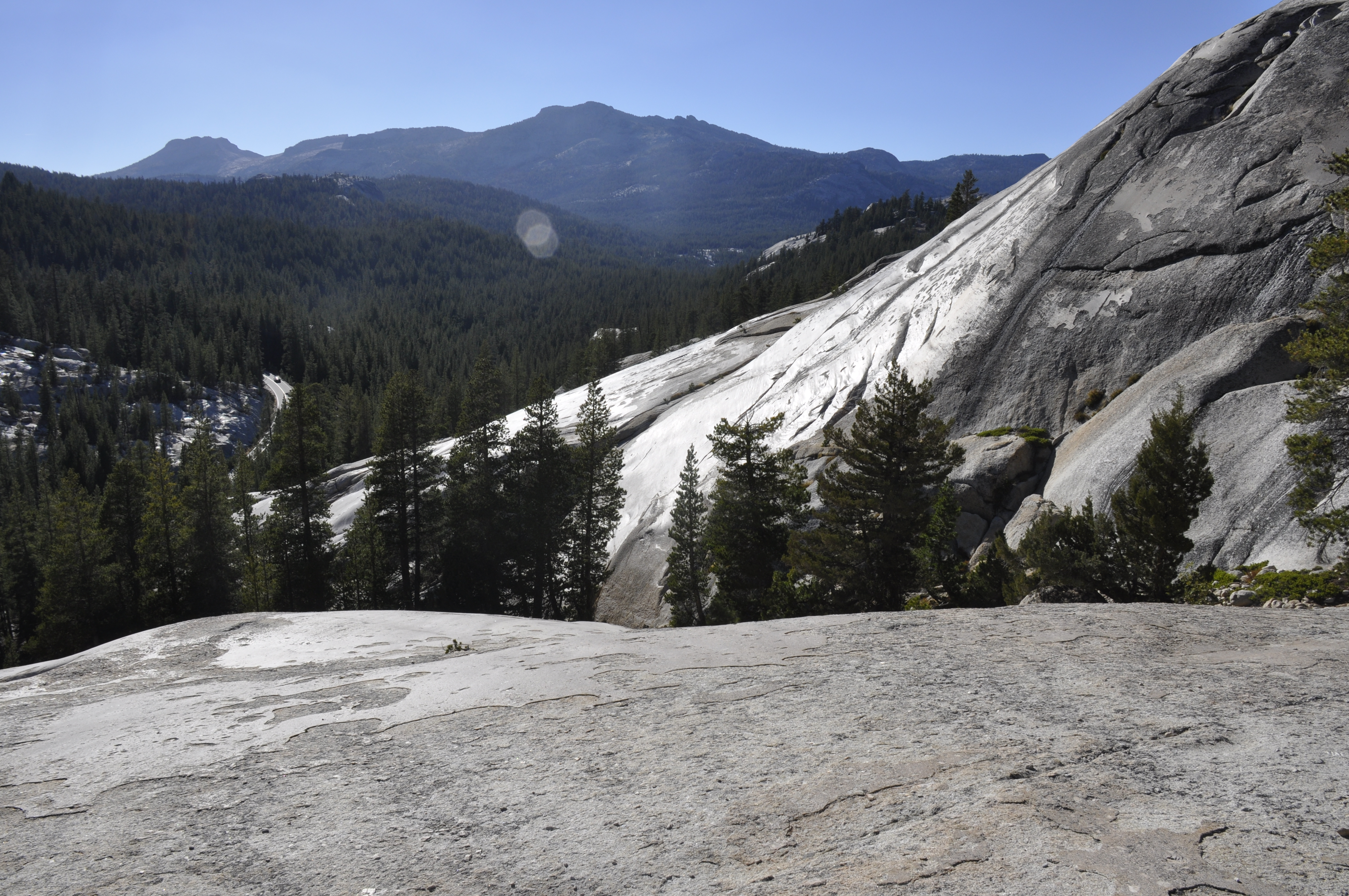
Glacial polish on Daff Dome

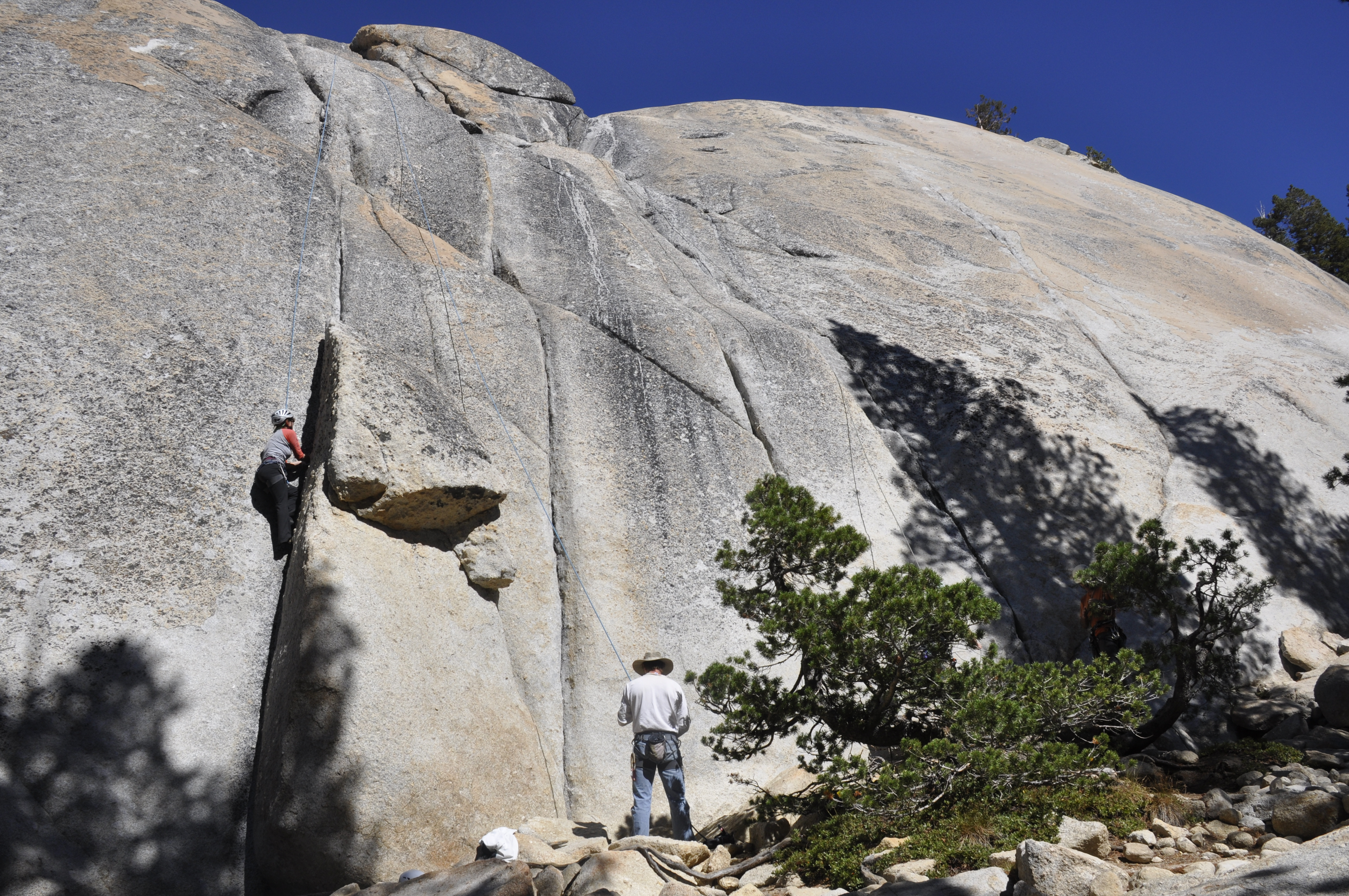
Climbing on the Guide Cracks
