= Granite dome =

Rounded hills of bare granite formed by exfoliation

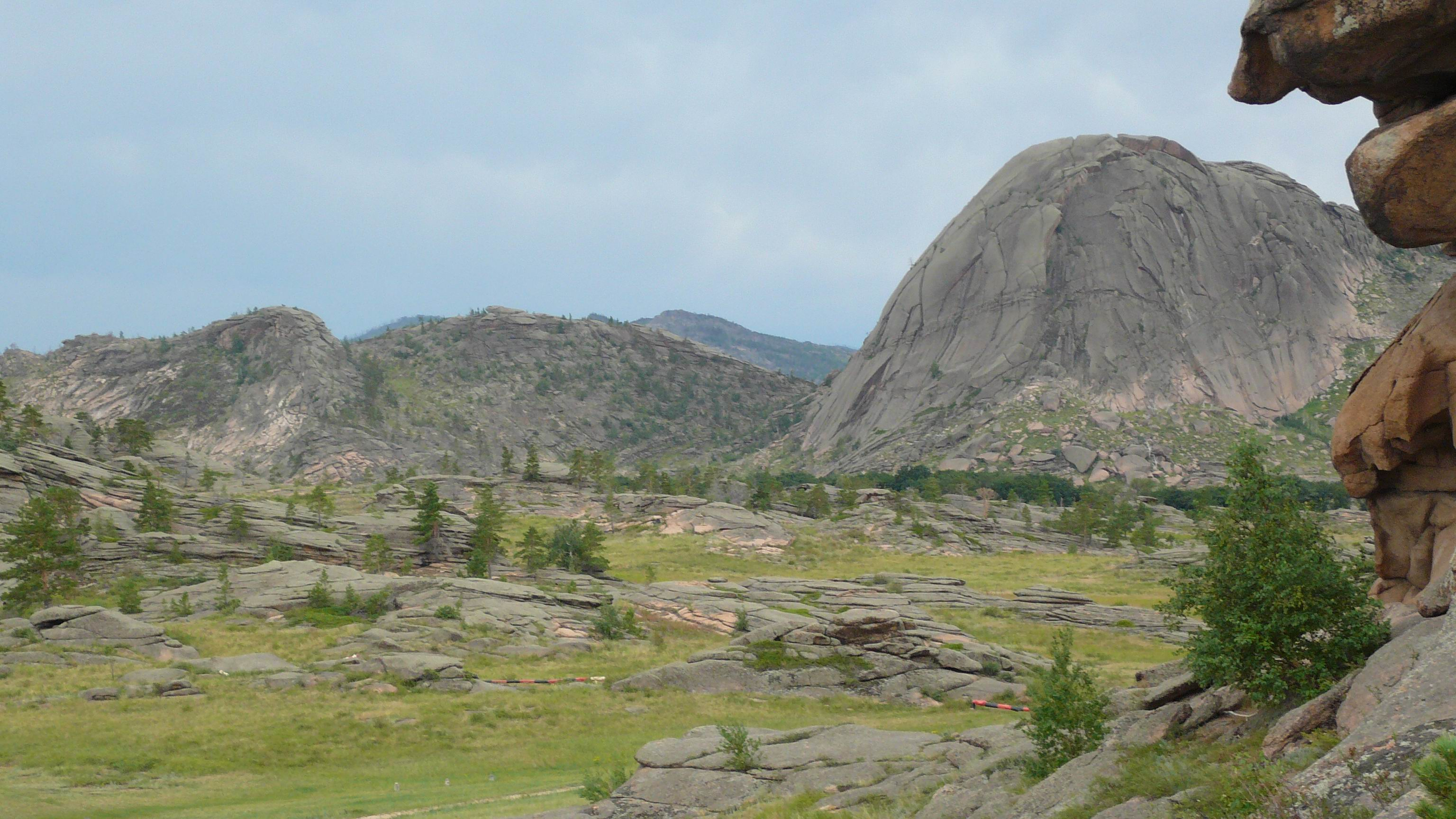
Mount Bulka, a granite monolith in Bayanaul National Park, Kazakhstan.

Granite domes are domical hills composed of granite with bare rock exposed over most of the surface. Generally, domical features such as these are known as bornhardts. Bornhardts can form in any type of plutonic rock but are typically composed of granite and granitic gneiss. As granitic plutons cool kilometers below the Earth's surface, minerals in the rock crystallize under uniform confining pressure. Erosion brings the rock closer to Earth's surface and the pressure from above the rock decreases; as a result the rock fractures. These fractures are known as exfoliation joints, or sheet fractures, and form in onionlike patterns that are parallel to the land surface. These sheets of rock peel off the exposed surface and in certain conditions develop domical structures. Additional theories on the origin of granite domes involve scarp-retreat and tectonic uplift.

== Sheet fractures ==
Sheet fractures are arcuate fractures defining slabs of rock that range from 0.5 to 10 meters thick. They normally form in sets parallel to the Earth's surface but may form in convex-upward or concave-upward sets. There are several possible explanations for the formation of sheet fractures. The most popular hypothesis is that they are the result of expansion and tangential fracturing consequent on erosional offloading or pressure release. There is evidence that supports this hypothesis when looking at granitic landforms that have sheet fractures. Granite forms deep in the Earth's crust under conditions of high ambient or lithostatic pressure. In order for the granite to be exposed at the Earth's surface a considerable thickness of rock must be eroded. This unloading allows the granite to expand radially and sheet fractures form tangentially to the radial stress. This indicates that the shape of the pre-existing land surface determines the geometry of the sheet fractures.

== Other theories of origin ==
One hypothesis is that granite domes are uplifted blocks. This is the case with some granite domes but the fracture related exfoliation joints are what controls the steep slopes. Another theory that regards isolated bornhardts is that they remain after long-distance scarp recession. Moisture related weathering is what causes scarp recession. In the case of granite in a desiccated landscape, the dry granite high on a slope remains stable and acts as caprock. Granite below this is more easily weathered and eroded because it has been exposed to moisture and has weathered. This ultimately leads to the steepening of the slope and the collapse of higher slope elements as well as the maintenance of scarps of essentially constant inclination and morphology during backwearing.

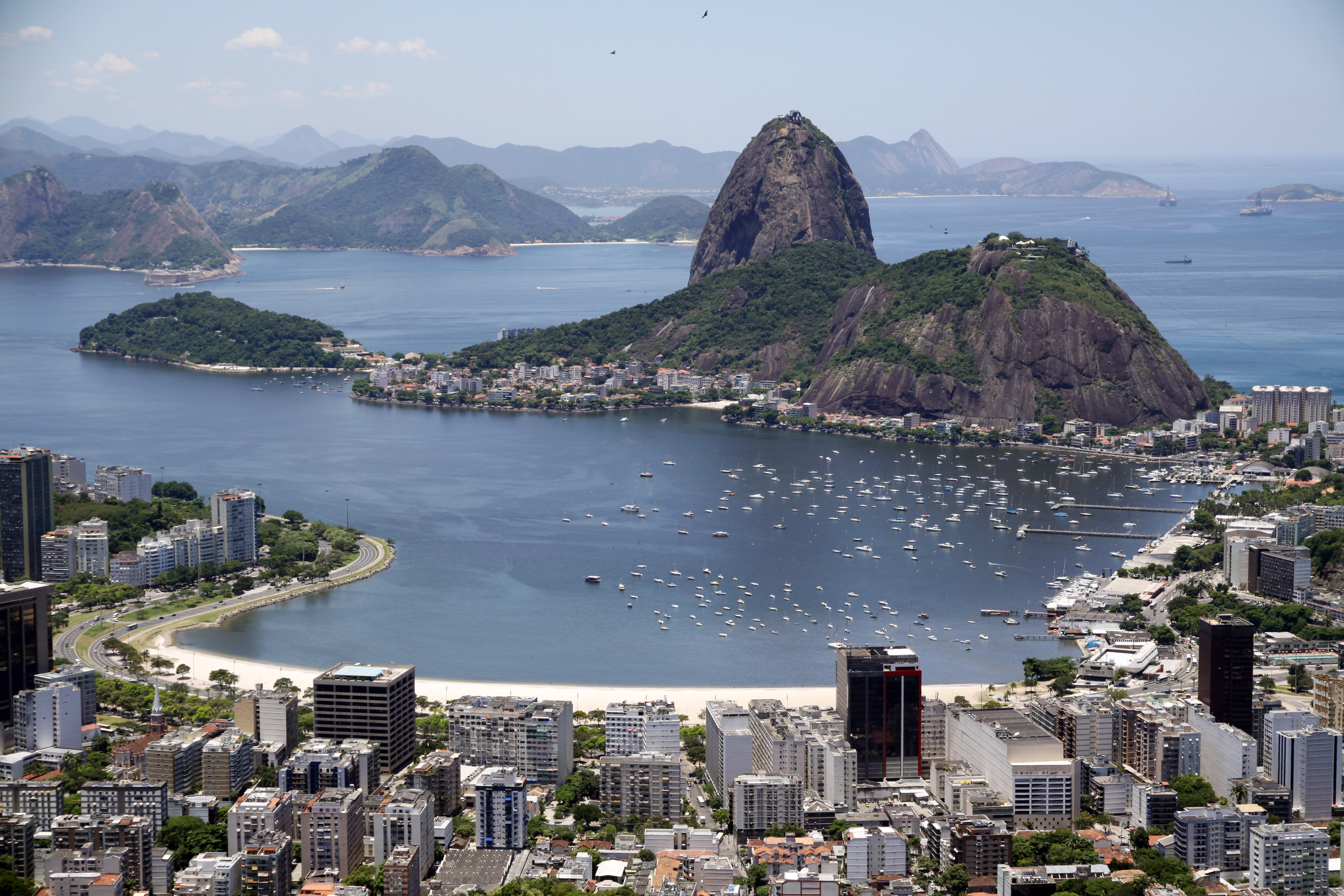
Sugarloaf Mountain in Rio de Janeiro, Brazil

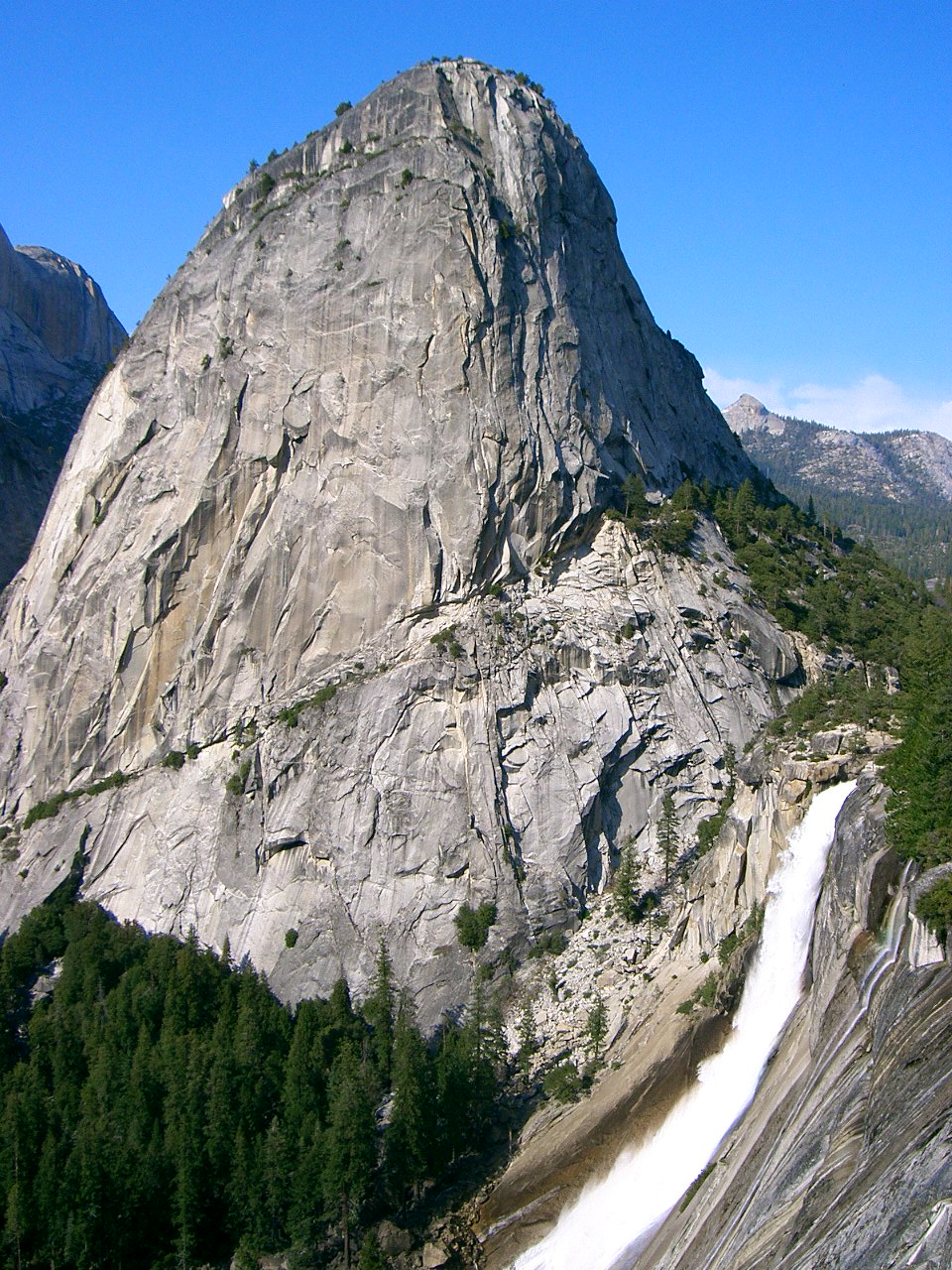
Liberty Cap in Yosemite National Park, California, United States

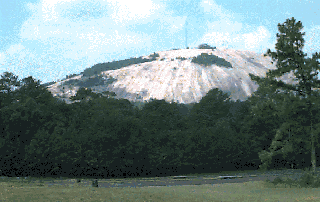
Stone Mountain in the U.S. state of Georgia

== See also ==
- Bald Rock National Park – National park in Australia, Australia
- Corcovado – Mountain in Rio de Janeiro, home to Christ the Redeemer, Brazil
- El Capitan – Vertical rock formation in Yosemite National Park, California, US, United States
- Exfoliating granite – Granite spalling in superficial layers due to tempearature cycles
- Enchanted Rock – Rock formation and protected area in central Texas, United States
- Fresno Dome – Granite dome in the state of California, United States
- Granite Belt, Australia
- Granite Dome, California, US
- Half Dome – Granitic dome in Yosemite National Park, California, United States
- Huangshan – Mountain range in southern Anhui, China China
- Looking Glass Rock – Mountain in Transylvania County, North Carolina, United States, United States
- Stawamus Chief – Mountain in British Columbia, Canada, Canada
- Stone Mountain – Mountain and park in Georgia, United States, United States
- Yosemite National Park – National park in California, United States, United States
