= List of Yosemite destinations =

A list of Yosemite destinations includes hiking trails and things to see:

== Hiking trails ==
Popular hiking trails include:

=== Near the valley ===
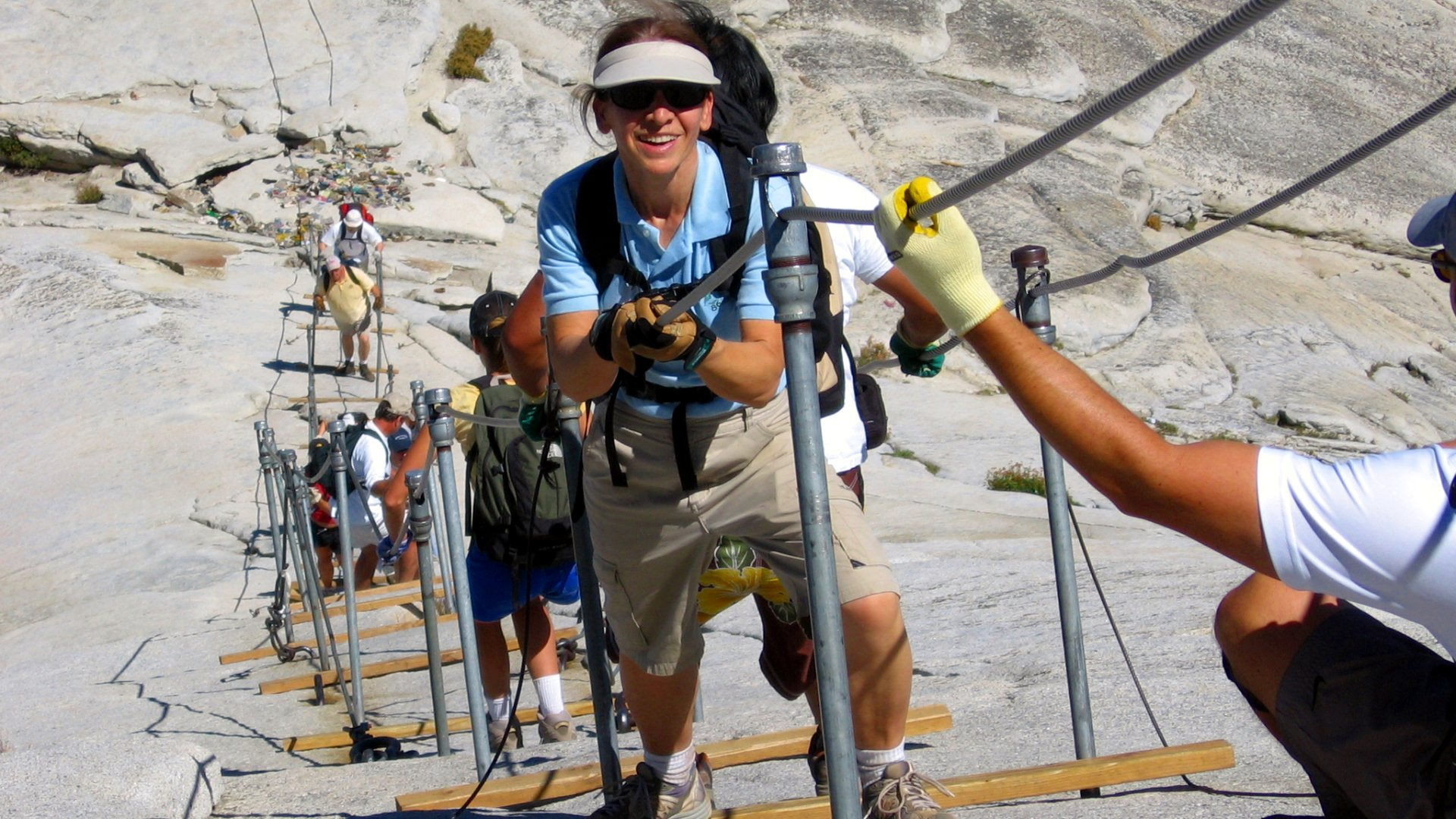
Hiking up the Half Dome cables

- Yosemite Falls
- Bridalveil Falls
- Mirror Lake
- Mist Trail
- Half Dome

=== Near Glacier Point ===
- Panorama Trail from Glacier Point
- Four Mile Trail from Glacier Point
- McGurk Meadow
- Ostrander Lake
- Mono Meadow
- Taft Point
- Sentinel Dome

=== Near Wawona ===
- Chilnualna Falls
- Alder Creek
- Mariposa Grove

=== Other hiking ===
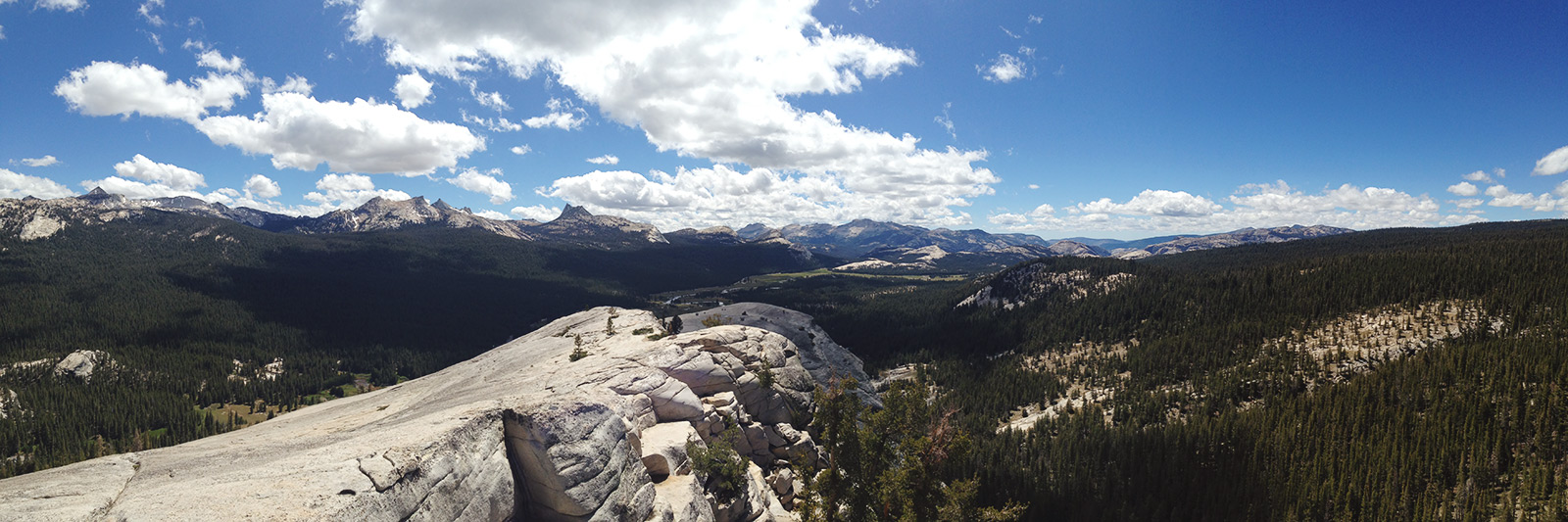
View from top of Lembert Dome

- Wapama Falls
- Rancheria Falls
- Soda Springs
- Dog Lake
- Lembert Dome
- Glen Aulin
- Elizabeth Lake
- Cathedral Lakes
- John Muir Trail
- Mono Pass
- Gaylor Lakes
- Lake Vernon trail

== Things to see ==
Popular things to look at in Yosemite Park include:

=== Waterfalls ===
See: List of Yosemite waterfalls

=== Rock formations ===
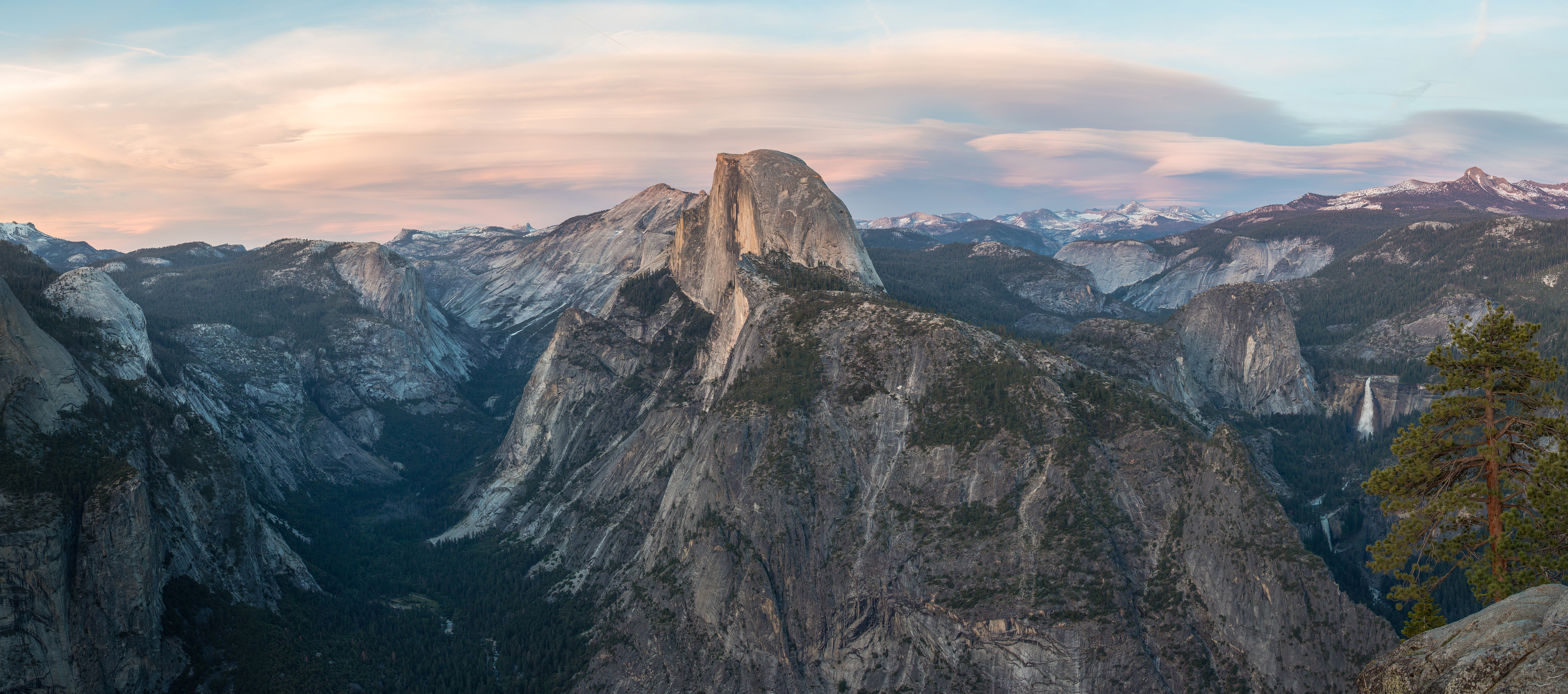
View from Glacier Point

- Half Dome
- El Capitan
- Cathedral Rocks
- The Three Brothers
- Sentinel Rock
- Yosemite Point
- Glacier Point
- Liberty Cap
- Kolana Rock
- Hetch Hetchy Dome
- Clouds Rest
- Arch Rock

=== Giant Sequoias ===
For information about the tree, see Sequoiadendron giganteum. Groves of the trees include:

- Mariposa Grove
- Tuolumne Grove
- Merced Grove

=== Scenic vistas ===
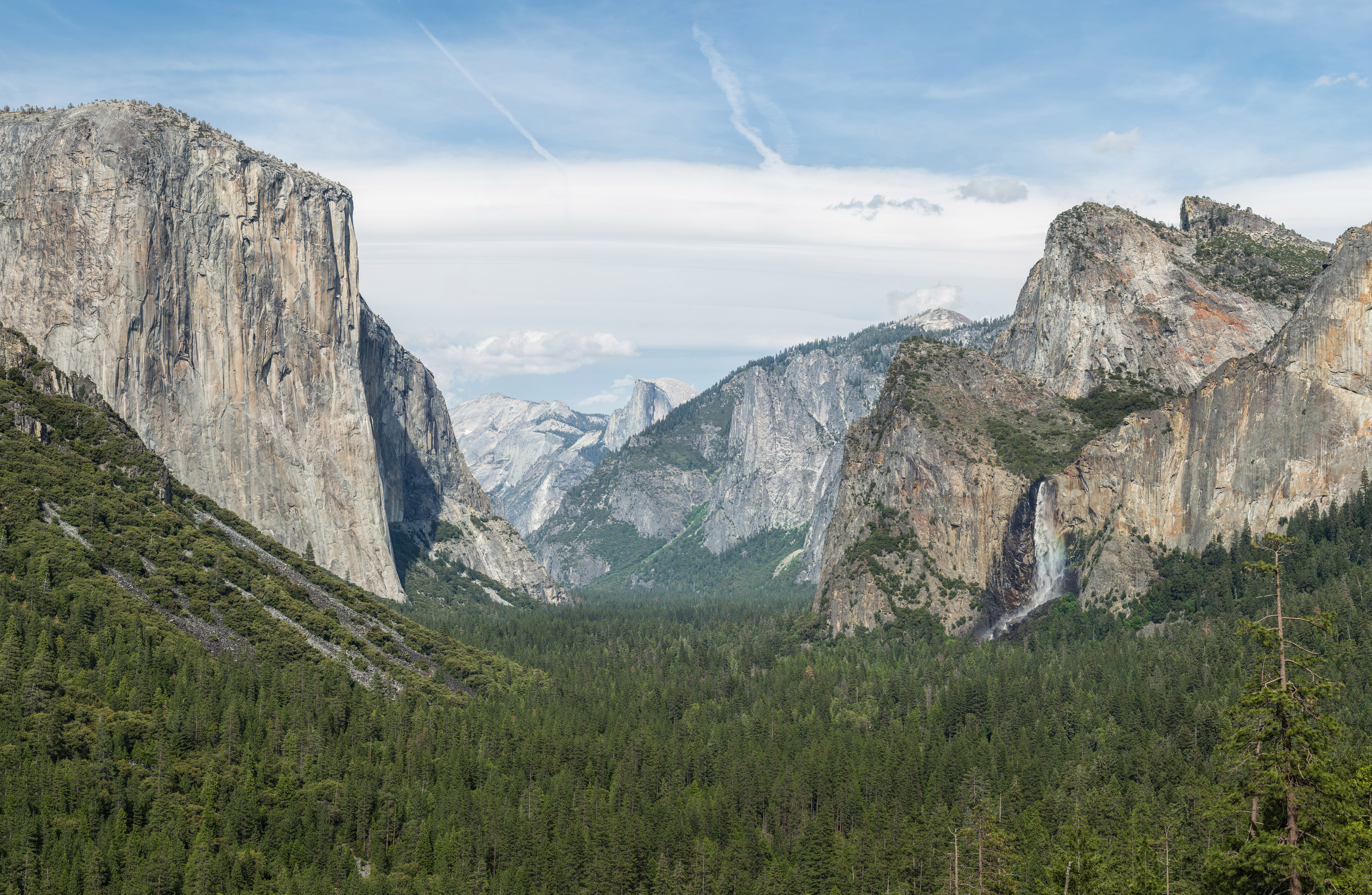
Tunnel View

- Glacier Point
- Olmsted Point
- Tunnel View
- El Portal View
- O'Shaughnessy Dam
- Cascade View
- Pothole Dome
- Lembert Dome
- Vogelsang Pass
- Yosemite Valley itself contains many views

== Granite domes ==
See Granite Domes of Yosemite National Park
