= Falls Creek (California) =

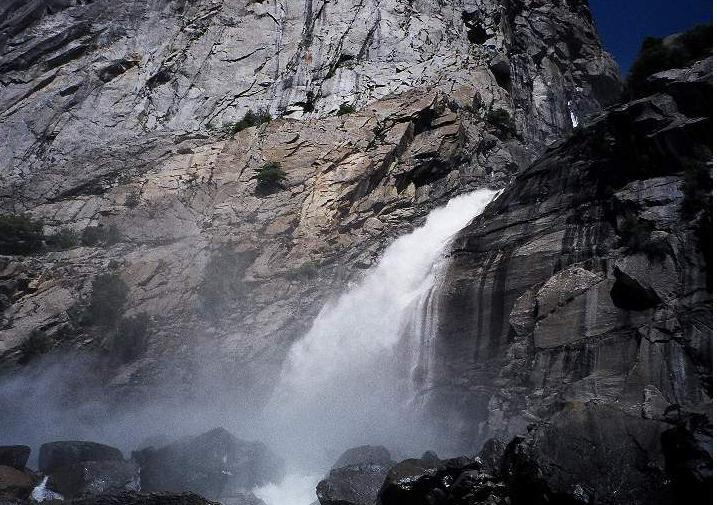
- One of the several tiers of Wapama Falls
- Etymology: Named for the two large waterfalls that occur at its mouth

Location
- Country: United States
- State: California
- Region: Yosemite National Park

Physical characteristics
- Source: Dorothy Lake
  - coordinates: 38°10′10″N 119°35′43″W
  - elevation: 9,500 ft (2,900 m)
- Mouth: Hetch Hetchy Reservoir
  - coordinates: 37°57′47″N 119°45′55″W
  - elevation: 3,783 ft (1,153 m)
- Length: 24 mi (39 km)
- Basin size: 44.5 mi^{2} (115 km^{2})
- Discharge
  - location: Tuolumne River

Basin features
- Tributaries
  - left: Tilden Creek

Falls Creek, also known as the Falls River, is a tributary of the Tuolumne River in Yosemite National Park, California, United States. The creek begins at the northern boundary of the national park and flows 24 miles (39 km) to empty into the Tuolumne at Hetch Hetchy Reservoir, dropping over two well-known waterfalls. The Pacific Crest Trail and other national park trails follow the creek for much of its course.

== Course ==
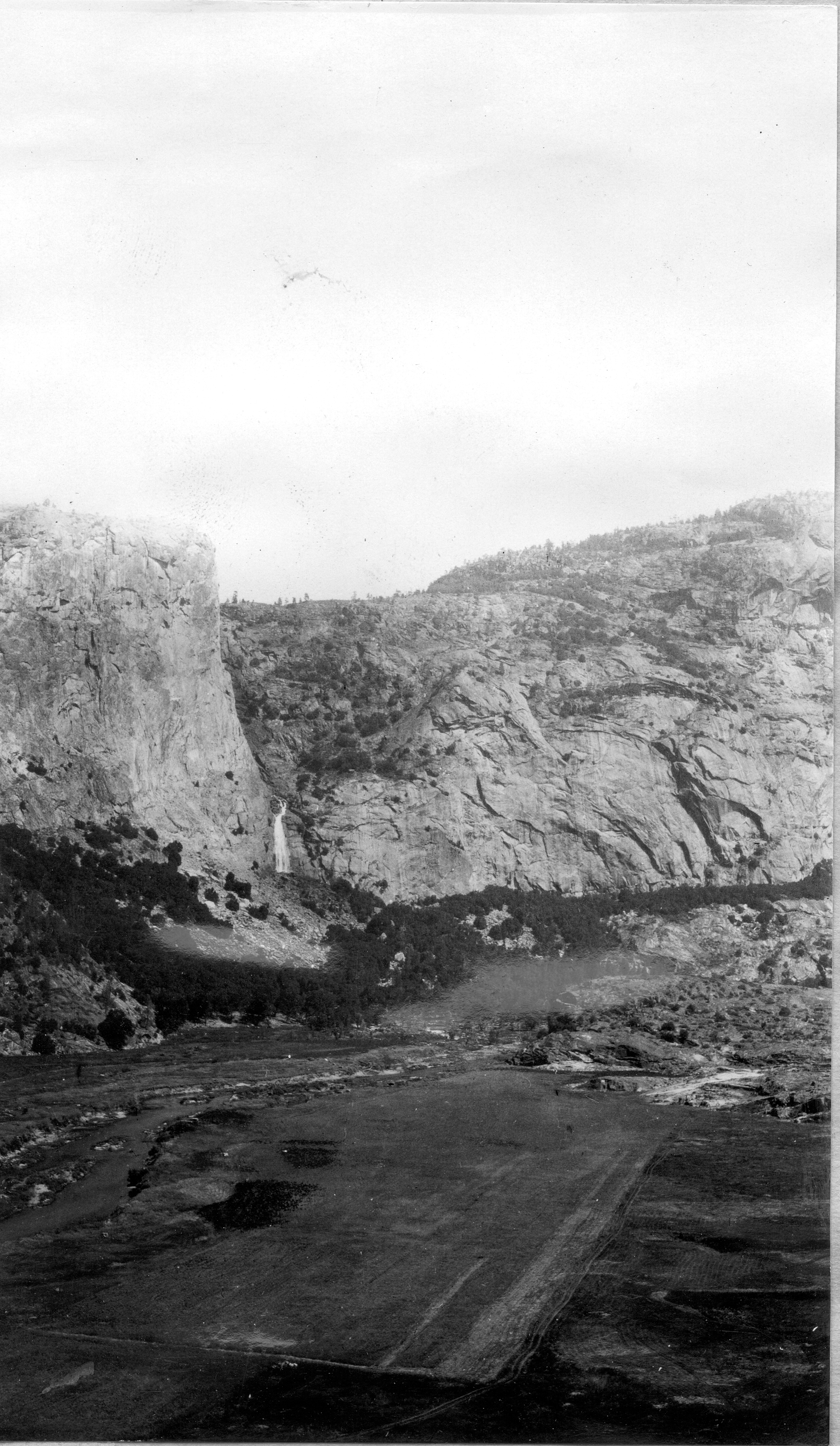
The mouth of Falls Creek on Hetch Hetchy Valley before flooding

Falls Creek begins at Dorothy Lake, which is located at one of the northernmost points in the national park. The headwaters, at nearly 10,000 feet (3,000 m) in elevation, lie between Forsyth Peak, Dorothy Lake Pass, Bond Pass and Bigelow Peak. It plunges into Jack Main Canyon, paralleling the Pacific Crest Trail, which carries it south to round Chittenden Peak, where Tilden Creek enters from the left. From there the creek passes Branigan Lake, then cascades down into the basin containing Lake Vernon, which it empties into. Issuing out of the southwest end of the lake, the creek flows in a southwesterly direction, approaching Hetch Hetchy Reservoir. Very near the mouth, it runs past Hetch Hetchy Dome and splits into two distributaries, which both cascade over the rim of Hetch Hetchy Valley, forming two waterfalls, Wapama Falls and Tueeulala Falls, near Hetch Hetchy Dome.

== Watershed ==
The Falls Creek watershed drains 44.5 square miles (115 km^{2})2012-03-29 of the Sierra Nevada northern Yosemite National Park. It is a narrow, tilde-shaped area stretching about 18 miles (29 km) from north to south and 2 miles (3.2 km) at its widest. The watershed shares a boundary with Frog Creek and Eleanor Creek to the west, and Tiltill and Rancheria Creek to the east. All of these creeks are tributaries of the Tuolumne River, which is in turn a tributary of the San Joaquin River. The glaciated, mostly-granite bowls and moraines of the Falls Creek watershed are home to many lakes, both named and unnamed. These include Dorothy, Mary, Tilden, Wilma, and Vernon lakes. The creek runs year round and is known to produce large amounts of runoff, often flooding bridges that carry the Hetch Hetchy trail over its mouth in the peak of snowmelt.

== Recreation ==
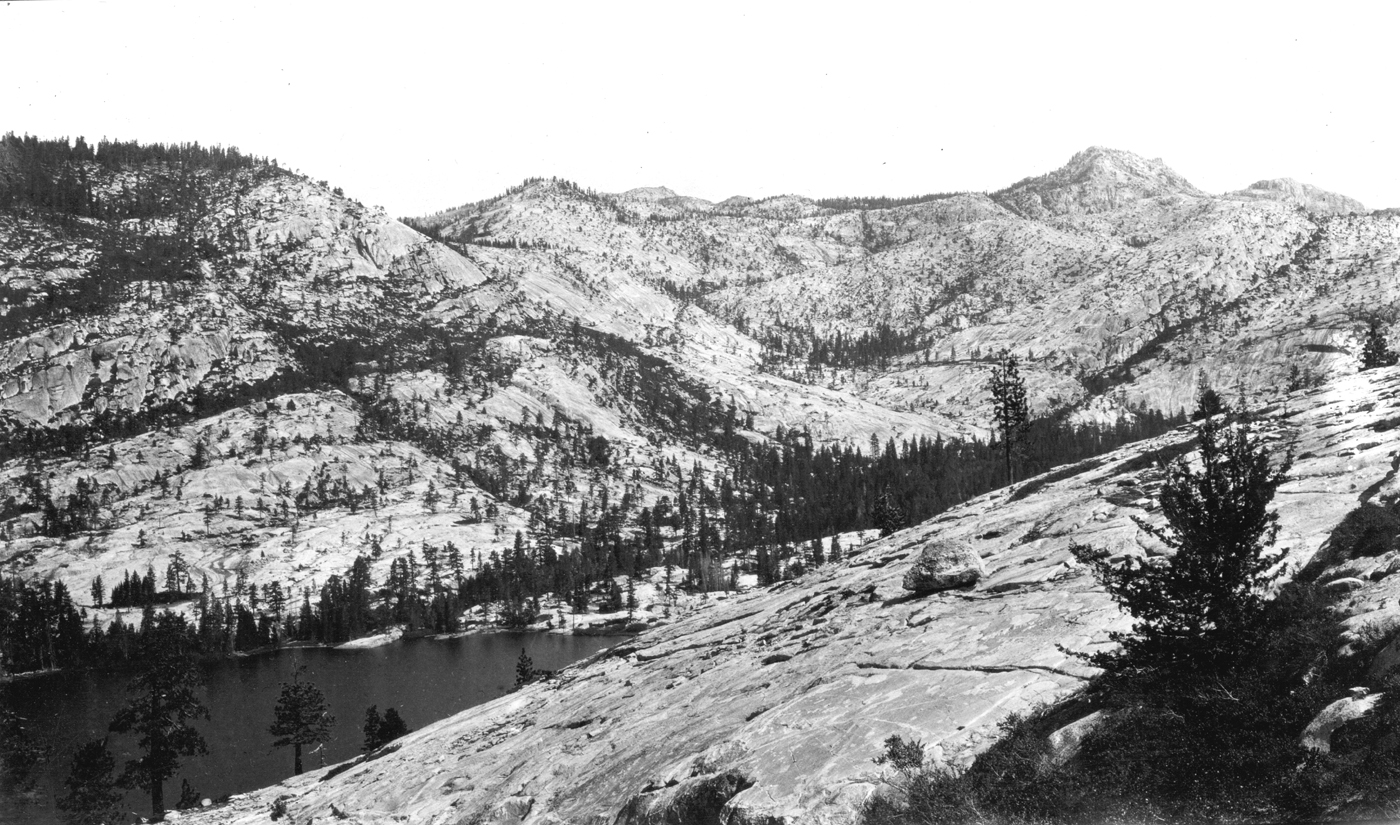
Lake Vernon near the mouth of Falls Creek is located in a basin where many of the trails in the Falls Creek watershed converge

Trails follow Falls Creek for much of its length. From Dorothy Pass at its headwaters to the beginning of the canyon, the Pacific Crest Trail follows the creek southward, but breaks away to the east afterward, near Wilma Lake. From there, a spur trail continues to follow the creek southwest to the end of the canyon, where it climbs to follow the ridge to the west of the creek. Another trail leads from the west side of Hetch Hetchy Valley and climbs above the Falls Creek drainage divide with Eleanor Creek (which flows into Lake Eleanor) and loops down to Lake Vernon. An unofficial trail also leads southwest from Lake Vernon to the brink of Wapama Falls. There are two ranger stations near Falls Creek, one at Wilma Lake and one at Lake Vernon. There are no designated campsites anywhere within the Falls Creek watershed.

== See also ==
- Rancheria Creek
- List of rivers of California
