= Chittenden =

Chittenden may refer to:

== Places in the United States ==
- Chittenden County, Vermont, a county
- Chittenden, Vermont, a town
  - Chittenden (CDP), Vermont, a village and census-designated place in the town
- Chittenden, California, an unincorporated community
- Chittenden Hotel, a former hotel in Columbus, Ohio
- Chittenden Lake, a lake in Madera County, California
- Chittenden Peak, a mountain in Tuolumne County, California
- Mount Chittenden, a mountain in Park County, Wyoming

== People ==
- Frank Hurlbut Chittenden (1858–1929), American entomologist
- Hiram M. Chittenden (1858–1917), Seattle District Engineer for the Army Corps of Engineers
- Kate Sara Chittenden (1856–1949), American classical pianist, head of piano at Vassar College, founding dean of the American Institute of Applied Music
- Khan Chittenden (born 1983), New Zealand-born Australian actor
- Lucius E. Chittenden (1824–1900), Vermont author, banker, lawyer, politician and peace advocate
- Martin Chittenden (1763–1840), member of U.S. House of Representatives (1803–1813), and Governor of Vermont (1813–1815)
- Russell Henry Chittenden (1856–1943), biochemist at Yale University
- Simeon B. Chittenden (1814–1889), United States Representative from New York
- Thomas Chittenden (1730–1797), first Governor of Vermont (1778–1789, 1790–1797)
