= Raker Act =

Act of United States Congress (1913)

- Other short titles: Hetch Hetchy Act
- Long title: An Act Granting to the city and county of San Francisco certain rights of way in, over and through certain public lands, the Yosemite National Park, and Stanislaus National Forest, and certain lands in the Yosemite National Park, the Stanislaus National Forest, and the public lands in the State of California, and for other purposes
- Nicknames: The Raker Bill
- Enacted by: the 63rd United States Congress
- Effective: December 19, 1913

Citations
- Public law: Public Law 63-41
- Statutes at Large: 38 Stat. 242

Legislative history
- Introduced in the House of Representatives as H.R. 7207 by John E. Raker (D‑CA) on April 7, 1913; Committee consideration by House Committee on Public Lands; Passed the House of Representatives on September 3, 1913 (183–43); Passed the Senate on December 6, 1913 (43–25); Signed into law by President Woodrow Wilson on December 19, 1913

United States Supreme Court cases
- United States v. San Francisco (1940)

The Raker Act was an act of the United States Congress that permitted building of the O'Shaughnessy Dam and flooding of Hetch Hetchy Valley in Yosemite National Park, California. It is named for John E. Raker, its chief sponsor. The Act, passed by Congress in 1913 during the Wilson administration, specified that because the source of the water and power was on public land, no private profit could be derived from the development. The plan for damming the valley was fought for years by John Muir. Construction of the dam was finished in 1923.

There have been ongoing allegations that the Act is being breached by private profits being made; and there have also been several campaigns aimed at removing the dam and restoring the valley.

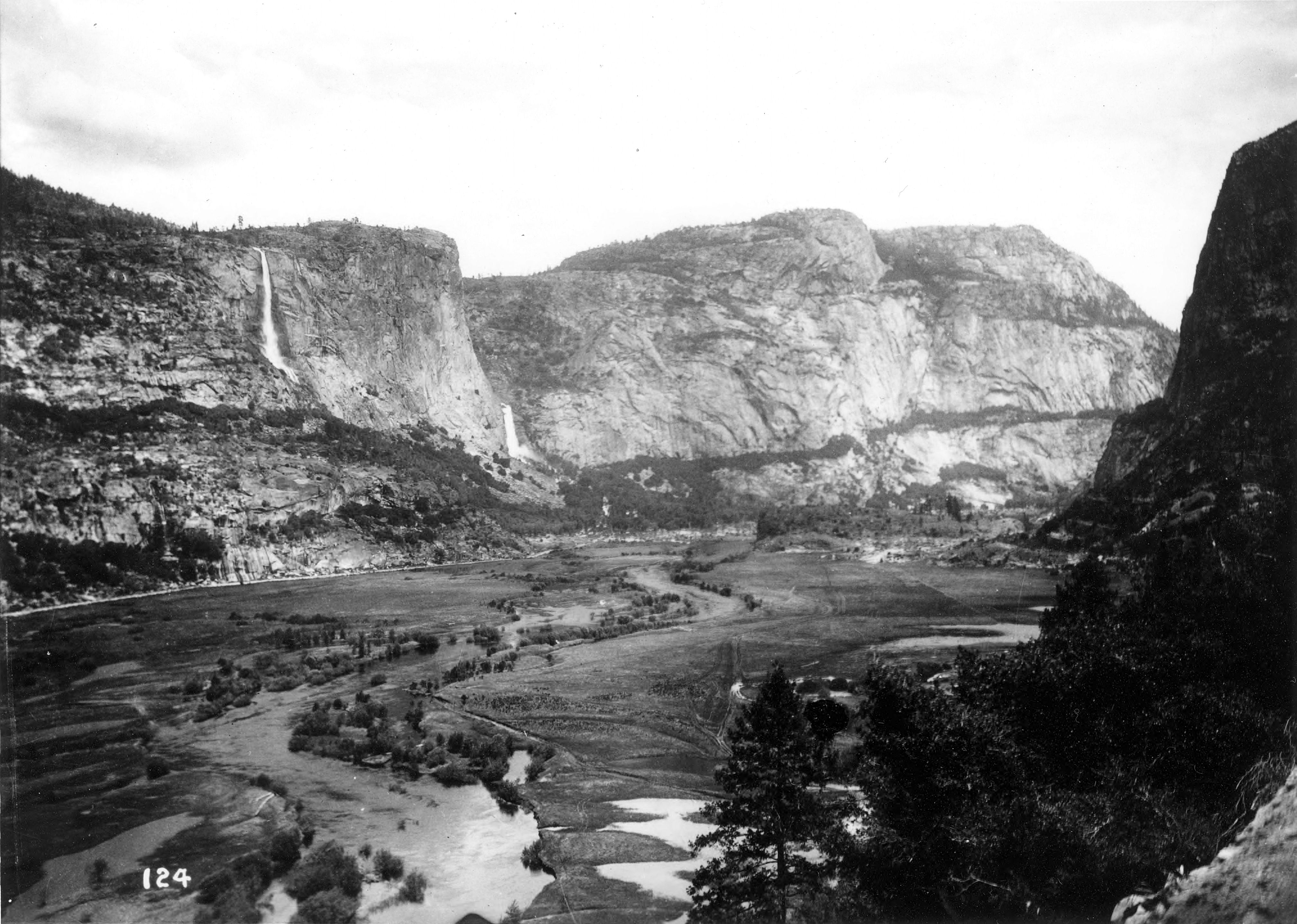
Hetch Hetchy Valley before the Raker Act

== History ==
The Raker Act may be said to have its roots in an 1882 proposal by the San Francisco and Tuolumne Water Company of Sonora. This water company had proposed carrying Tuolumne River water to San Francisco from Jacksonville (a community flooded nearly a century later by the construction of New Don Pedro Reservoir). At this time the rapid growth of the city of San Francisco was in danger of being limited by a lack of access to plentiful, reliable water supplies. The city needed a way to meet municipal water needs at a reasonable cost. The city also wanted to escape the monopoly held by the Spring Valley Water Company. The politicians in San Francisco came up with the idea to use the watershed in the Hetch Hetchy Valley to supply their water needs and break the monopoly. This area was felt by proponents to be ideal for the creation of a reservoir because of its relative proximity to the city and its ample supply of water from the snows stored in the high mountains of the Sierra Nevada. The construction of a hydroelectric dam would also supply the city with much needed power.

A major issue with converting the Hetch Hetchy Valley into a municipally owned reservoir was that it was within the borders of the newly formed Yosemite National Park. Mayor James Phelan sent a request to Congress to have the land within the Hetch Hetchy available for purchase, which resulted in the 1901 Right of Way Act, which allowed the Secretary of the Interior to grant rights to governments to reserve public lands containing possible water supplies as long as it benefited the public and didn't adhere to private interests. After the enactment of the Right of Way Act Mayor Phelan transferred his water rights to the Hetch Hetchy Valley to the city and county of San Francisco. The city and county of San Francisco immediately applied for a permit to develop their water project in the Hetch Hetchy Valley. The Secretary of the Interior Ethan Hitchcock opposed the Right of Way Act because he believed that Yosemite National Park should be left untouched and pristine, so he quickly denied their permit.

In 1906, San Francisco suffered a catastrophic earthquake. About 500 city blocks were destroyed by the quake and subsequent fire, which spotlighted the city's need for more water. In the aftermath of the earthquake in 1906, the water purveyors and the city of San Francisco seized the opportunity to continue to push for a permit to use the Hetch Hetchy Valley for their water needs. In 1908, Secretary of the Interior James R. Garfield reversed the order given by his predecessor, Ethan Allen Hitchcock, which denied San Francisco a permit to buy the land it sought to acquire in Yosemite National Park, in a rehearing for the city's permit.

Garfield had an opposing stance on conservation and believed that Hetch Hetchy Valley was not unique and a lake in its place would be more appealing, plus the money generated from the hydroelectric power could eventually pay for the initial cost of constructing the dam. Garfield's authorization of building water infrastructure in the Hetch Hetchy Valley was not set in stone because future Secretaries of the Interior could reverse his decision, and solidifying San Francisco's right to build water infrastructure in Yosemite would have to go through United States Congress. In late 1908, the citizens of San Francisco approved the allocation of $600,000 in bonds to be used to purchase land and water rights in the Hetch Hetchy Valley to build a dam for a reservoir and aqueduct lines. They also approved a $45 million bond in 1910 to be issued for the construction of all the water infrastructure.

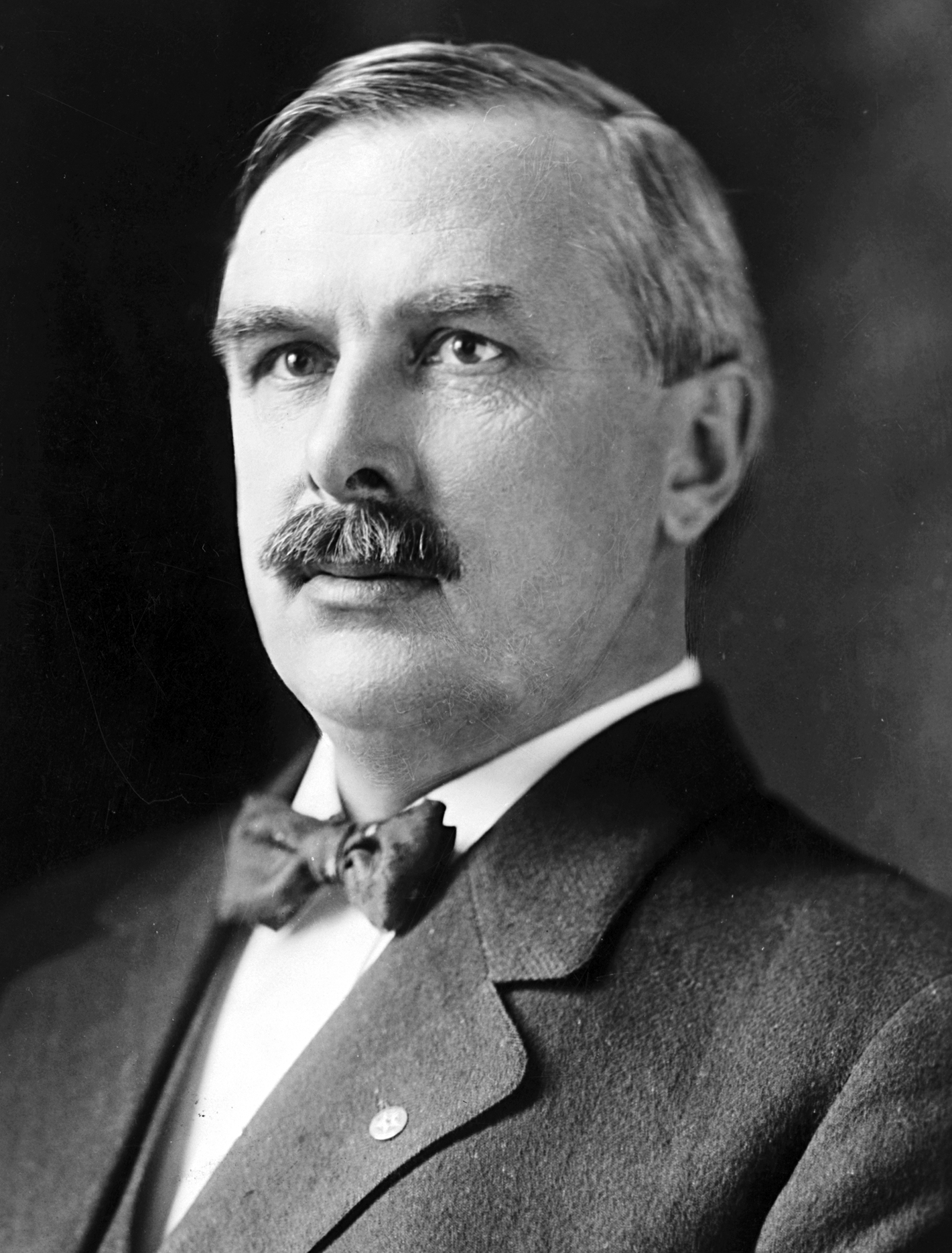
John Raker, U.S. Rep. of CA

Both Secretaries of the Interior under the Taft administration, Richard A. Ballinger and Walter Fisher, opposed construction of water infrastructure in the Hetch Hetchy Valley. They instead suggested that the city of San Francisco build reservoirs at Lake Eleanor and Cherry Valley, which were considered to be less attractive and environmentally important than Hetch Hetchy Valley. This kept the project at bay. The president of the American Society of Engineers in 1912, John R. Freeman submitted a plan, supported by the U.S. Advisory Board of Army Engineers, that determined the construction of water infrastructure in the Hetch Hetchy Valley would deliver a substantial amount of water at a fraction of the cost, compared to the proposed plan to use the Cherry Valley and Lake Eleanor. In 1913, Woodrow Wilson was elected president and suggested that the U.S. Congress review San Francisco's application to develop in Yosemite. On September 3, 1913, the House of Representatives passed HR7207, which was a bill submitted by John Raker that authorized the use of the Hetch Hetchy Valley and Lake Eleanor as a water source for San Francisco. The Raker bill was then passed in the U.S. Senate on December 2, 1913, and then signed by President Wilson on December 19. The bill was named the Raker Act after its chief advocate, John Raker.

== Controversy and resistance ==
During the beginning stages of planning for the development in Yosemite National Park, and the development of the Raker Act, there were a few parties that fought against San Francisco's water grab. The main defenders conserving the Hetch Hetchy Valley for recreational use were the Spring Valley Water Company, landowners in the Modesto and Turlock Irrigation Districts, and the Sierra Club. All had different agendas but fought for the same outcome.

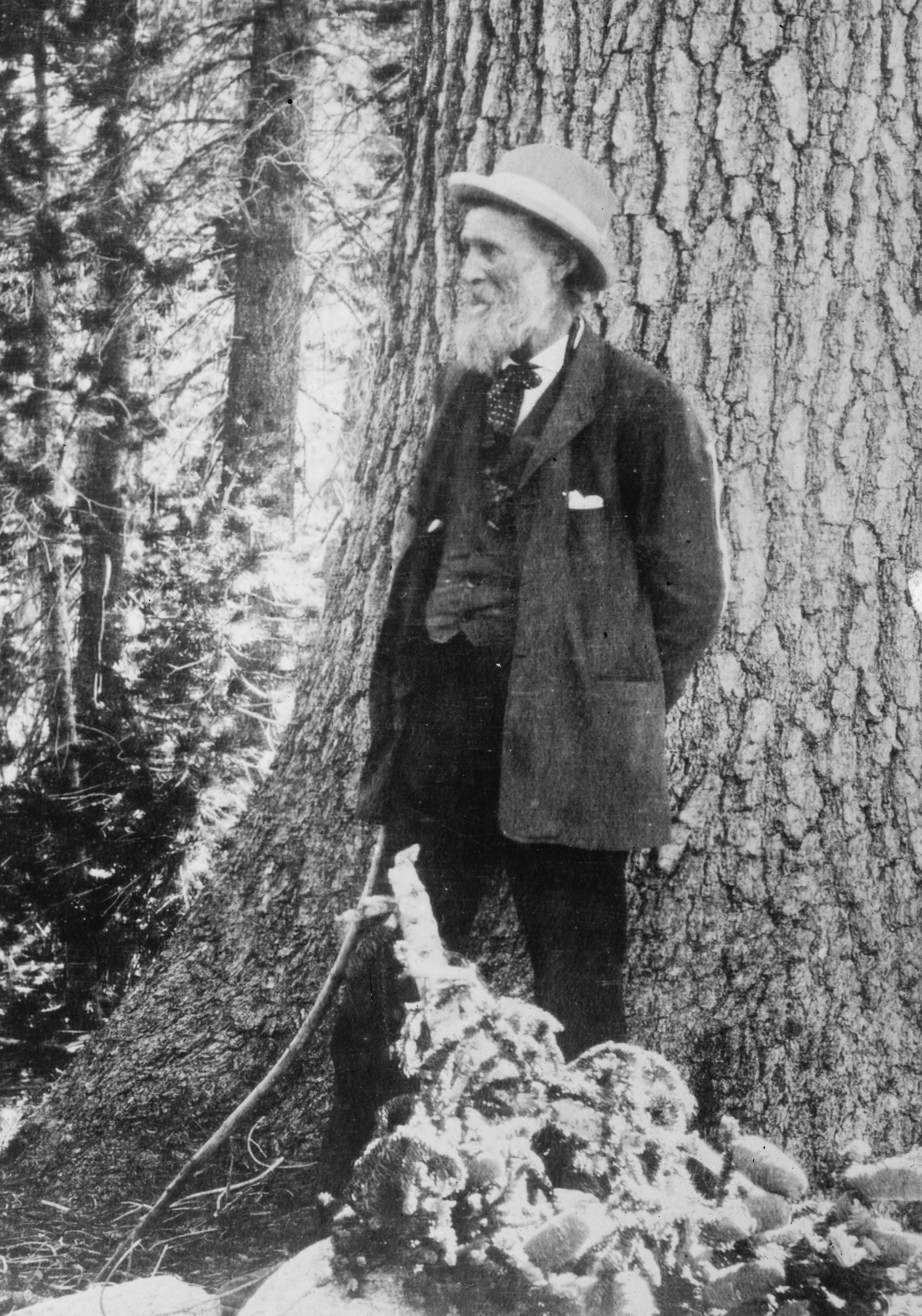
John Muir, founder of the Sierra Club

The most prominent figure in the Hetch Hetchy debate was the Sierra Club and its founder, John Muir. Muir opposed the Raker Act purely from an environmentalist standpoint. John Muir saw the Hetch Hetchy Valley as a prized natural resource and called it "one of Nature's rarest and most precious mountain temples". One of the main arguments from Muir's side was the ecotourism benefits the valley could provide, including revenue for the Federal Government. But this argument could not hold up against public interests that would benefit from the Raker Act. John Muir himself even admitted he did not want to deny water to millions of people, he just didn't want the newly formed National Parks to fall victim to public developments. Although Muir's avocation for National Parks against the Raker Act was an important proponent for the creation of the National Park Service. The government realized they needed an entity to enforce park laws and fight against development. Muir's efforts also noted as the start of modern environmentalism.

The interests of the Spring Valley Water Company were strictly profit based because they held a monopoly on San Francisco's water supply before the Raker Act. The building of the water infrastructure in the Hetch Hetchy Valley would mean they would no longer be able to control prices. The Irrigation Districts of Modesto and Turlock relied on the watershed from the Tuolumne River and the construction of a dam would limit their water supply. All of these interests combined were not enough to defeat the Raker Act because of the larger public interests in San Francisco.

In the present, timing of the dam's operation has shifted to night and early mornings as solar power has limited the need for electricity production during the day and decreased energy prices. Relaxation of the Act's restrictions on who San Francisco may sell the dam's electricity to may provide more flexibility and support recreation on the Tuolumne River.

== Attempts to enforce Raker Act and restore the Hetch Hetchy Valley ==
The San Francisco Bay Guardian led a multi-year effort to publicize allegations of Raker Act violations. They repeatedly stated that San Francisco sold the power to PG&E, who then resold it back to the public at a profit, in violation of the Raker Act. Harold Ickes of the Roosevelt Interior Department tried for many years to enforce the Raker Act, but he was unsuccessful. Donald Hodel, Secretary of the Interior under the Reagan administration in 1987, directed his staff to investigate finding alternative water sources for San Francisco, drain Hetch Hetchy reservoir, and restore the valley to its natural state. In 2007, the George W. Bush administration made an attempt to allocate funds to the National Park Service for a study into the removal of the dam and the restoration of the Hetch Hetchy Valley.

== See also ==
- Restore Hetch Hetchy
