= Forsyth Peak =

Forsyth Peak may refer to:

- Forsyth Peak (California), a mountain in the Sierra Nevada
- Cruzen Range § Forsyth Peak, a mountain in Antarctica
