= Rancheria Creek (Tuolumne County, California) =

Stream in California

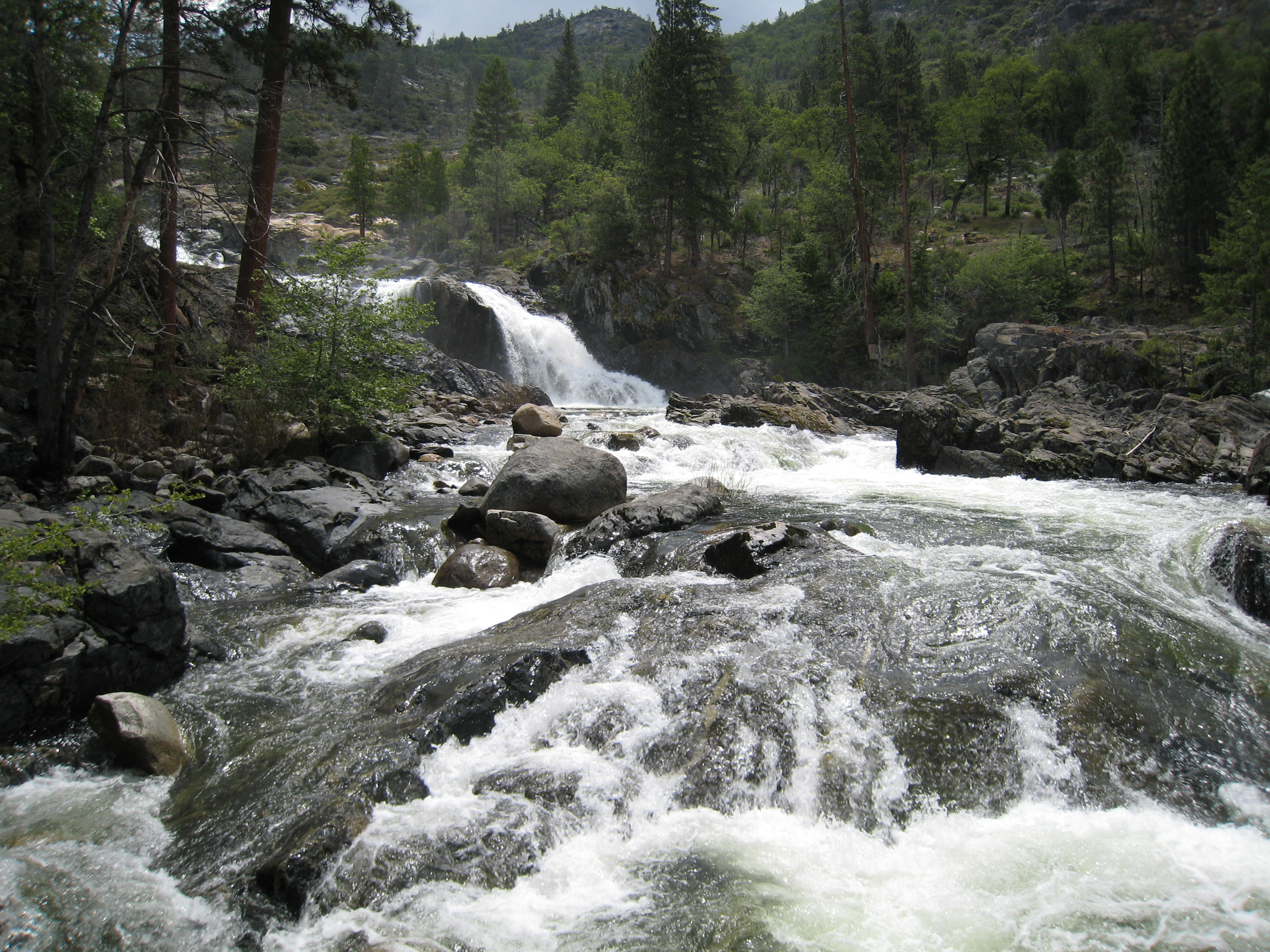
- Below Rancheria Falls

- Location of Rancheria Creek in California

Location
- Country: United States
- State: California

Physical characteristics
- Source: Peeler Lake
  - location: Sierra Nevada
  - coordinates: 38°07′22″N 119°28′14″W
  - elevation: 9,494 ft (2,894 m)
- Mouth: Tuolumne River
  - location: Hetch Hetchy Reservoir
  - coordinates: 37°57′12″N 119°43′41″W
  - elevation: 3,796 ft (1,157 m)
- Length: 24.3 mi (39.1 km)
- Basin size: 74.5 mi^{2} (193 km^{2})

Rancheria Creek is a 24.3-mile (39.1 km) long stream in northern Yosemite National Park mostly in Tuolumne County, California and is a tributary of the Tuolumne River. Draining a large area of the Sierra Nevada, it is the largest tributary of the Tuolumne within Yosemite National Park. The stream is labeled as Kerrick Creek on some early maps.

The creek begins at Peeler Lake at the Sierra Crest, in Mono County, and immediately crosses westward into Tuolumne County. It flows in a southerly direction through Kerrick Meadow and a series of high mountain valleys until reaching Kerrick Canyon, where it turns abruptly west. The Pacific Crest Trail parallels the creek through Kerrick Canyon. At the end of the canyon it receives a major tributary from Stubblefield Canyon and turns southwest, receiving Tilden Creek. Continuing southwest, it flows through rugged and complex granite formations, receives Breeze Creek, then turns west once more for its last few miles. It drops 150 feet (46 m) over Rancheria Falls before emptying into Hetch Hetchy Reservoir, adjacent to Tiltill Creek. Prior to the flooding of Hetch Hetchy Valley in 1923 with the construction of O'Shaughnessy Dam, Rancheria and Tiltill Creeks combined before joining the Tuolumne River on the valley floor.

== See also ==
- Falls Creek (California)
- List of rivers of California
