= Kolana Rock =

Granite dome in Yosemite National Park, USA

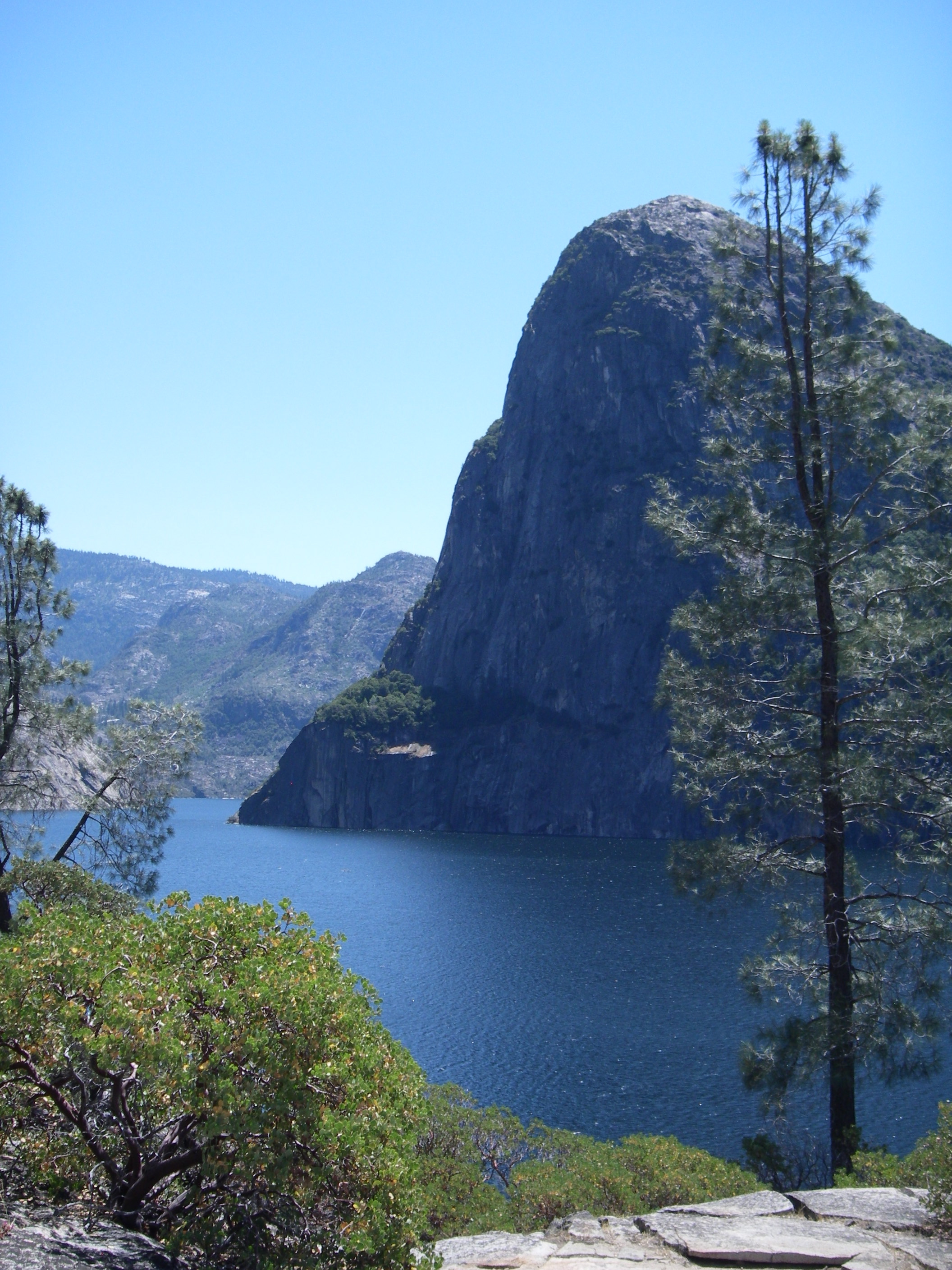
- Kolana Rock as viewed from the North-West side of Hetch Hetchy Valley

Highest point
- Elevation: 5,774 ft (1,760 m) NAVD 88
- Coordinates: 37°57′09″N 119°45′35″W

Geography
- Location within California
- Country: United States
- State: California
- County: Tuolumne County
- Protected area: Yosemite National Park
- Parent range: Sierra Nevada

Geology
- Mountain type: Granite dome

Kolana Rock is a prominent granite dome located along the southern edge of Hetch Hetchy Valley in Yosemite National Park. John Muir stated that Kolana was the Indian name for the rock. It towers 2,000 feet (610 m) above the Hetch Hetchy Reservoir, and is across from Hetch Hetchy Dome.

The dome was closed to rock climbing for many years during the breeding season of the Peregrine Falcon. The closure was lifted in 2013.
