= McGurk Meadow =

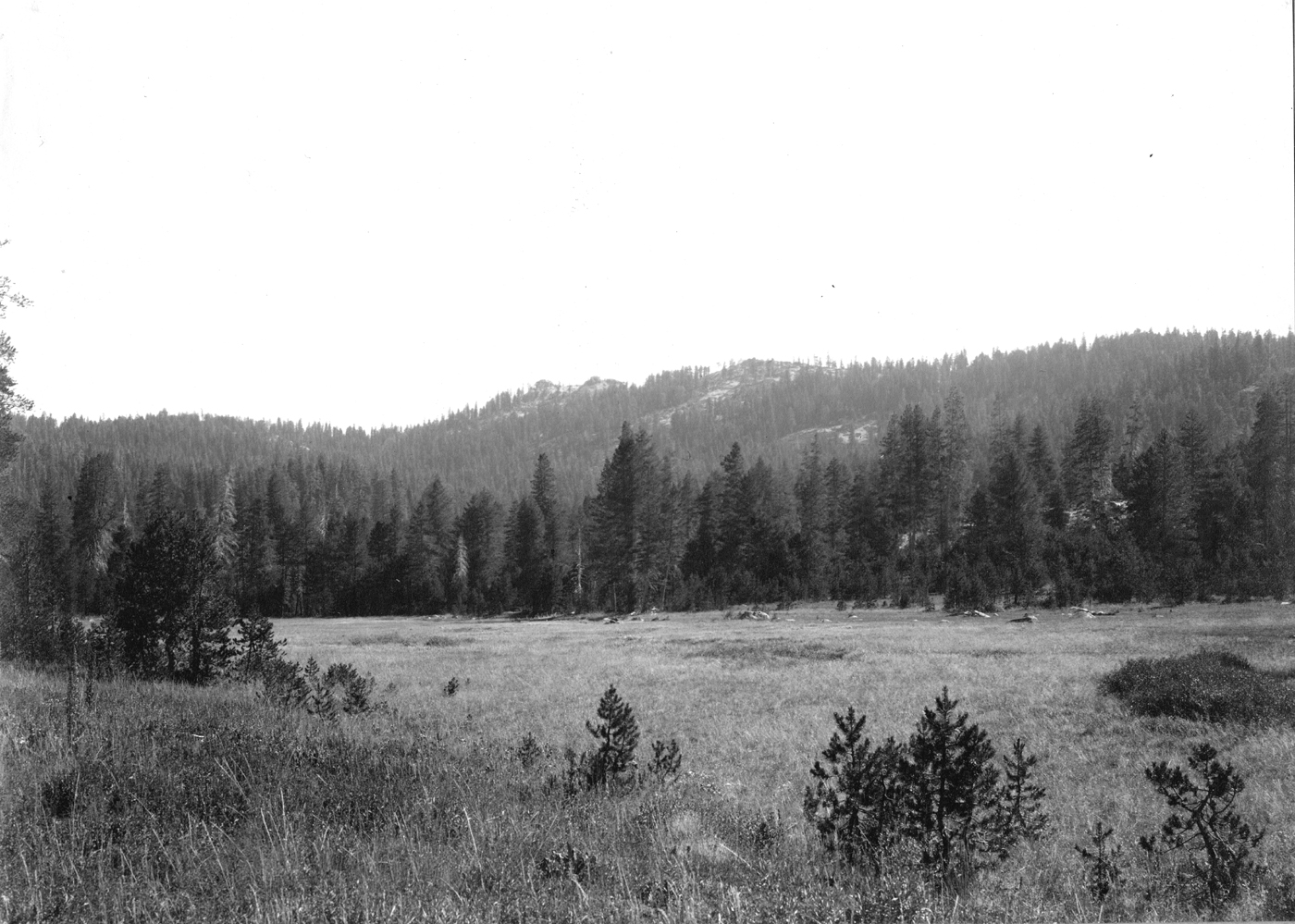
Lower McGurk Meadow. Ostrander Rocks in background.

McGurk Meadow is a meadow in Yosemite National Park located near Bridalveil Fall. It is located at 37°40′48″N 119°37′55″W.
