= Tiltill Creek =

Stream in California, USA

Coordinates: 37°57′25″N 119°43′46″W

Tiltill Creek is a stream in the U.S. state of California. It empties into the Hetch Hetchy Reservoir. Tiltill Creek is entirely within Yosemite National Park.

"Tiltill" is a name derived from a Native American language meaning "tarweed".
