= Chittenden Lake =

Lake in the state of California, United States

- Location within California
- Location: Madera County, California
- Coordinates: 37°33′14″N 119°22′31″W
- Type: lake

Chittenden Lake is a lake in Madera County, California, in the United States.

Chittenden Lake was named for Corynne and Bob Chittenden of Fresno, California.

== See also ==
- List of lakes in California
