= Hetch Hetchy to Lake Vernon Trail =

Trail in Yosemite National Park, USA

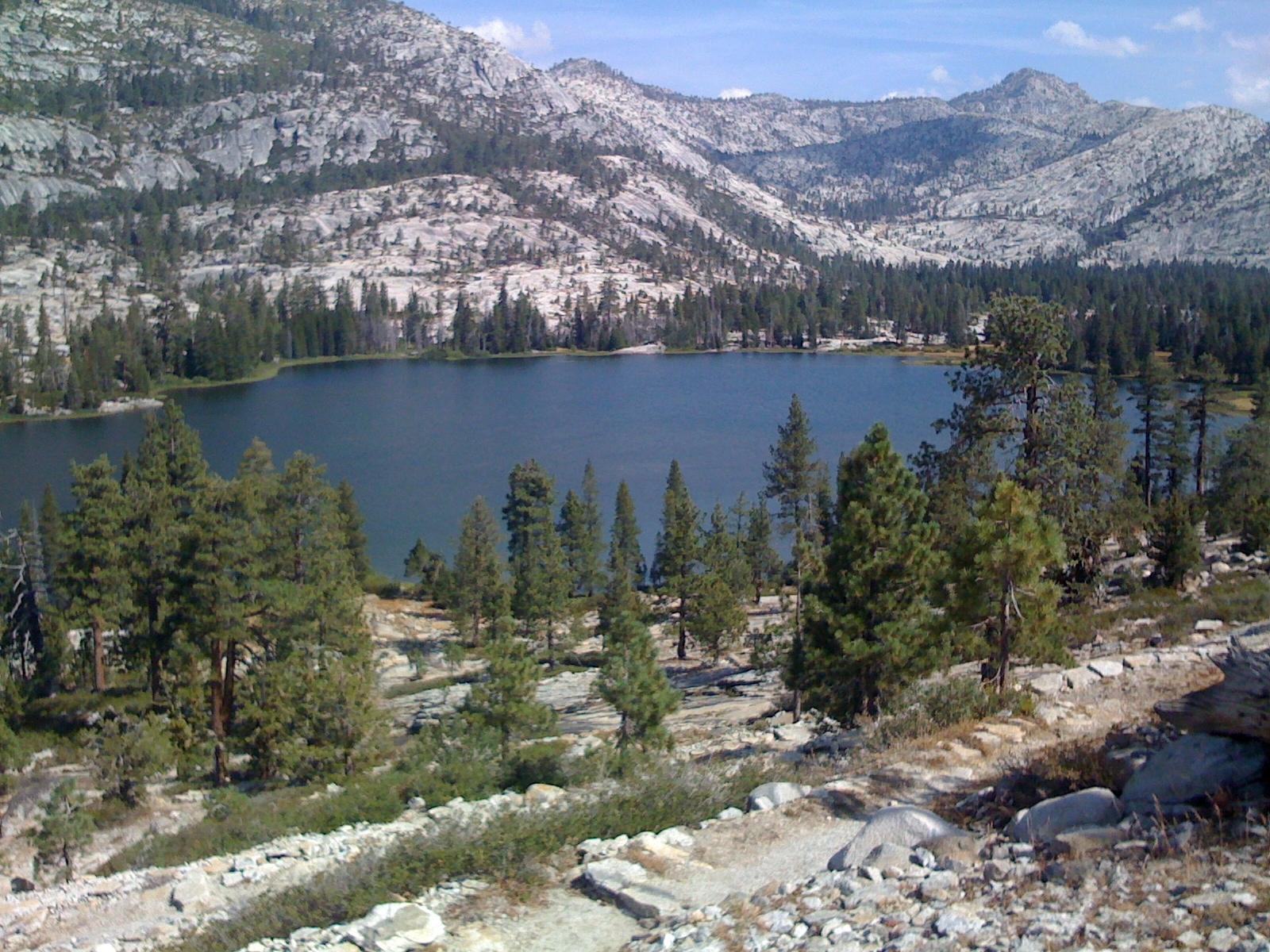
- Trail at Lake Vernon
- Length: 11.5 mi (18.5 km)
- Location: Yosemite National Park, Tuolumne County, California, USA
- Trailheads: O'Shaughnessy Dam, 37°56′47″N 119°47′15″W; Lake Vernon, 38°00′39″N 119°43′57″W
- Use: Hiking
- Elevation change: 2,700 ft (820 m)

The Hetch Hetchy to Lake Vernon Trail in Yosemite starts from the parking lot close to the O'Shaughnessy Dam at the Hetch Hetchy Reservoir, and goes to Lake Vernon through the Yosemite Wilderness. Staying overnight requires a wilderness permit which can be obtained at the Hetch Hetchy ranger station or reserved online.

== Trail Data ==
- Total distance: 23 miles (11.5 miles one way)
- Elevation gain: 2,700 feet (820 m)
- Climbing elevation: 4707 feet (3723 feet on the way in, 984 feet (300 m) on the way out)
