= Restore Hetch Hetchy =

- Formation: 1999
- Headquarters: Oakland, California
- Website: www.hetchhetchy.org

Restore Hetch Hetchy is a US non-profit organization seeking to restore the Hetch Hetchy Valley in Yosemite National Park to its original condition.

== History ==
The Hetch Hetchy Valley was sculpted by glaciers as recently as 10,000 years ago (like nearby Yosemite Valley). It has an elevation of 3,800 feet (1,200 m) above sea level and is 3 miles (5 km) long in an east to west orientation. The Hetch Hetchy Valley is in the northwest corner of Yosemite National Park, which was established in 1890.

Even before the establishment of Yosemite National Park, the city of San Francisco began considering the Tuolumne River and Hetch Hetchy Valley as a possible location for a reliable water source. This sparked a social and political debate which lasted until the issue was brought before Congress. John Muir, a naturalist and president of the Sierra Club, fought vigorously against the proposition of flooding the valley, stating, "Dam Hetch Hetchy! As well dam for water-tanks the people's cathedrals and churches, for no holier temple has ever been consecrated by the heart of man."

The construction of the O'Shaughnessy Dam (built 1915–1923) flooded the valley, creating the Hetch Hetchy Reservoir.

In the late 1980s, in response to an initiative by the Reagan Administration, the national Sierra Club created a group dedicated to restoring Hetch Hetchy Valley in Yosemite National Park called the Hetch Hetchy Restoration Task Force. In 1999, the Club created a separate non-profit organization called Restore Hetch Hetchy (RHH).

Because the reservoir in Hetch Hetchy is part of a water-diversion and electric-generating system on the Tuolumne River that includes the much larger downstream reservoir, Don Pedro (51% funded by the San Francisco Public Utilities Commission), as well as SFPUC's own Cherry and Eleanor Reservoirs near Hetch Hetchy, RHH filed comments in 2011 before the Federal Energy Regulatory Commission (FERC) on the 2015 relicensing of Don Pedro Reservoir.

In 2011, Restore Hetch Hetchy announced their plans to put the issue to the voters of San Francisco through a referendum. Proposition F, which would have allocated money to identify other sources of water with a stated goal of restoring the valley went before San Francisco voters in November 2012. The proposition had extensive opposition, including the Mayor and entire Board of Supervisors, and Senator Dianne Feinstein. It was soundly rejected, with 76.9% of voters against the proposition.

In 2015, Restore Hetch Hetchy sued San Francisco, arguing that the continuing existence of the dam and reservoir is a violation of the California Constitution's prohibition against any "unreasonable method of diversion". The Tuolumne County Courts dismissed the case, saying California Courts have no jurisdiction, as the dam was allowed by federal law. Restore Hetch Hetchy appealed, and the California Attorney General opined that the matter should be tried on the technical, not legal, merits. In July 2018, the appeals court threw out the lawsuit, declaring that Congress had overruled the state. The case was taken to the California Supreme Court which, in mid-October 2018, rejected the lawsuit in a 3–0 ruling.

Beginning in 2018, the Department of the Interior of the Trump administration began to consider a proposal initiated by RHH and California Trout to allow limited boating on the Hetch Hetchy Reservoir for the first time, with representatives of the two organizations arguing that "San Francisco received [Hetch Hetchy's] benefits long ago, but the American people have not."

A 2019 study commissioned by Restore Hetch Hetchy argued that draining the reservoir and equipping the valley with a tourism infrastructure comparable to that of Yosemite Valley (which receives around 100 times as many visitors annually compared to Hetch Hetchy's 44,000) could result in a "recreational value" of up to $178 million per year, or possibly an overall economic value of up to $100 billion.
