= Forsyth Peak (California) =

Mountain in the Sierra Nevada

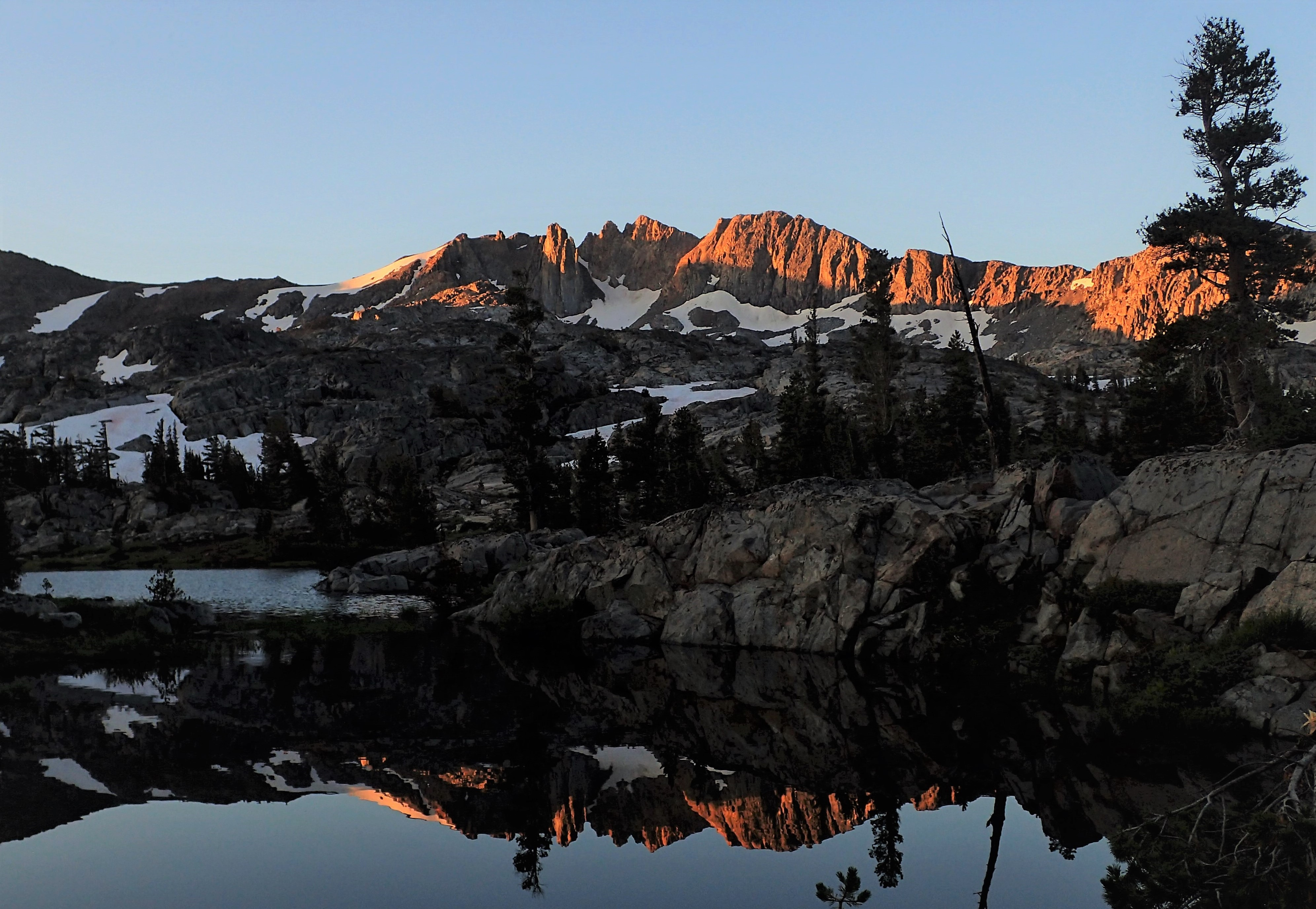
- North aspect, reflected in Stella Lake

Highest point
- Elevation: 11,177 ft (3,407 m)
- Prominence: 1,077 ft (328 m)
- Parent peak: Tower Peak (11,755 ft)
- Isolation: 2.0 mi (3.2 km)
- Coordinates: 38°09′27″N 119°34′51″W

Naming
- Etymology: William W. Forsyth

Geography
- Location within California Location within the United States
- Country: United States
- State: California
- County: Tuolumne
- Protected area: Yosemite National Park
- Parent range: Sierra Nevada
- Topo map: USGS Tower Peak

Geology
- Rock age: Cretaceous
- Mountain type: Fault block
- Rock type: Granitic

Climbing
- First ascent: 1937
- Easiest route: class 2

Forsyth Peak is an 11,177-foot-elevation (3,407-meter) mountain summit located in Tuolumne County, California, United States.

== Description ==
Forsyth Peak is situated in the Sierra Nevada mountain range at the northern end of Yosemite National Park. The mountain rises 1.25 miles (2.01 km) south of Dorothy Lake and two miles (3.2 km) west-northwest of Tower Peak which is the nearest higher neighbor. Precipitation runoff from this landform drains into headwaters of Falls Creek which is a tributary of the Tuolumne River. Topographic relief is significant as the summit rises 2,300 feet (700 meters) above Jack Main Canyon in 1.4 miles (2.3 km). Access to the mountain is via the nearby Pacific Crest Trail and the peak can be ascended from the class 2 south or west slopes.

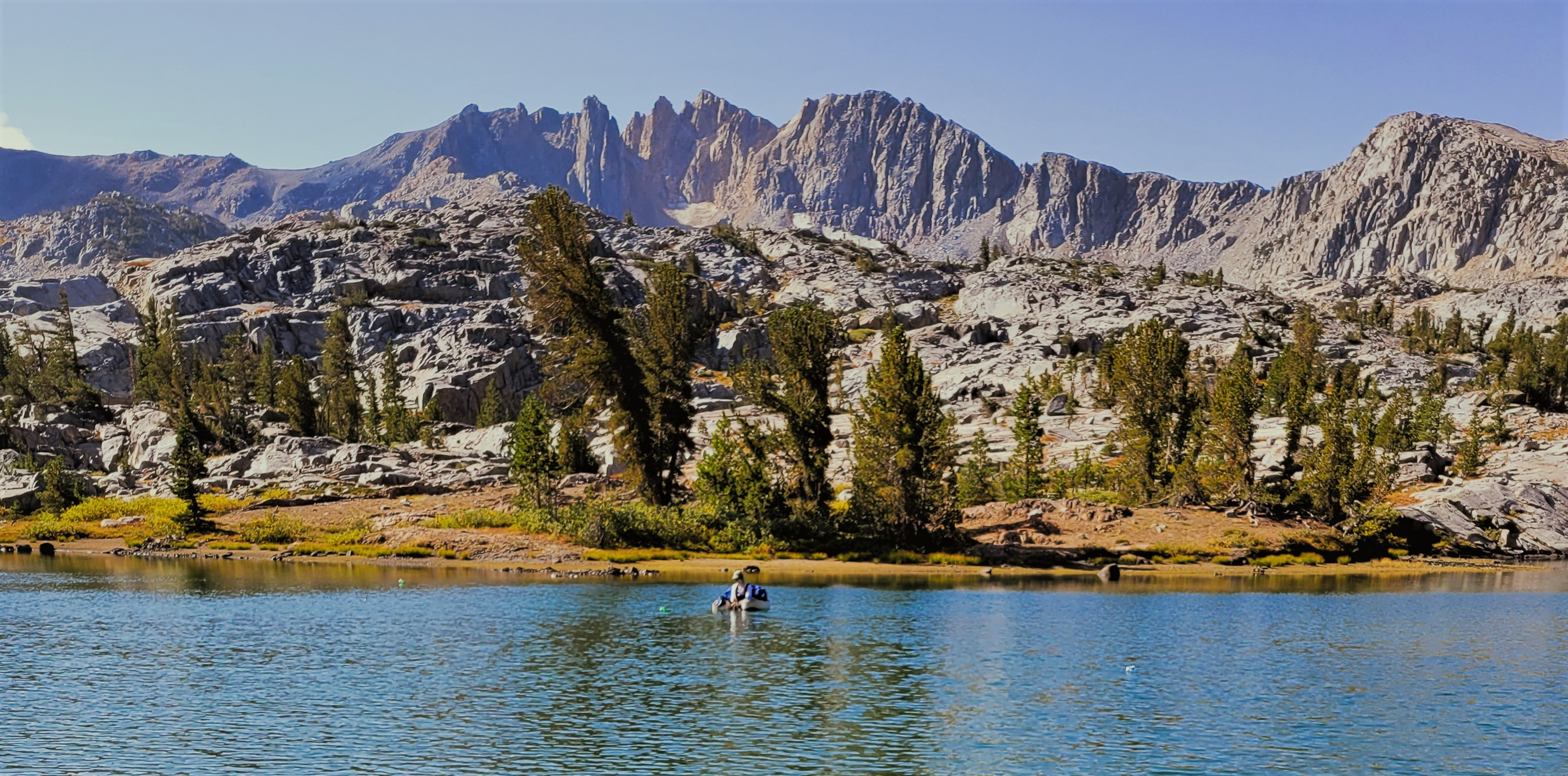
Forsyth Peak

== History ==
This mountain's toponym was officially adopted in 1932 by the U.S. Board on Geographic Names to honor Colonel William Woods Forsyth (1856–1933), United States Army, acting military superintendent of Yosemite Park (1909–1912). The US Army had jurisdiction over Yosemite National Park from 1891 to 1914, and each summer 150 cavalrymen traveled from the Presidio of San Francisco to patrol the park.

The first ascent of the summit was made on July 10, 1937, by Leon Casou, Arthur Evans, Don Hersey, Paul Hersey, Rene Kast, A. I. Teakle, and Harry Tenney Jr. The north ridge was first climbed August 23, 1953, by Ken Hondsinger, Le Roy Johnson, and Fred Schaub.

== Climate ==
According to the Köppen climate classification system, Forsyth Peak is located in an alpine climate zone. Most weather fronts originate in the Pacific Ocean and travel east toward the Sierra Nevada mountains. As fronts approach, they are forced upward by the peaks (orographic lift), causing them to drop their moisture in the form of rain or snowfall onto the range.

== See also ==
- Geology of the Yosemite area
