= Chittenden Peak =

Mountain in Tuolumne County, California, U.S.

- Location within California

Highest point
- Elevation: 9,963 ft (3,037 m)
- Prominence: 565 ft (172 m)
- Coordinates: 38°5′54.02″N 119°37′8.32″W

Geography
- Location: Yosemite National Park, Tuolumne County, California, United States
- Parent range: Sierra Nevada
- Topo map: USGS Piute Mountain

Chittenden Peak is a summit in Yosemite National Park, Tuolumne County, California, United States. With an elevation of 9,580 feet (2,920 m), Chittenden Peak is the 649th highest summit in the state of California.

Chittenden Peak was named for Hiram M. Chittenden, an engineer for the Army Corps of Engineers.
