= Hetch Hetchy Dome =

Granite dome in Yosemite National Park, USA

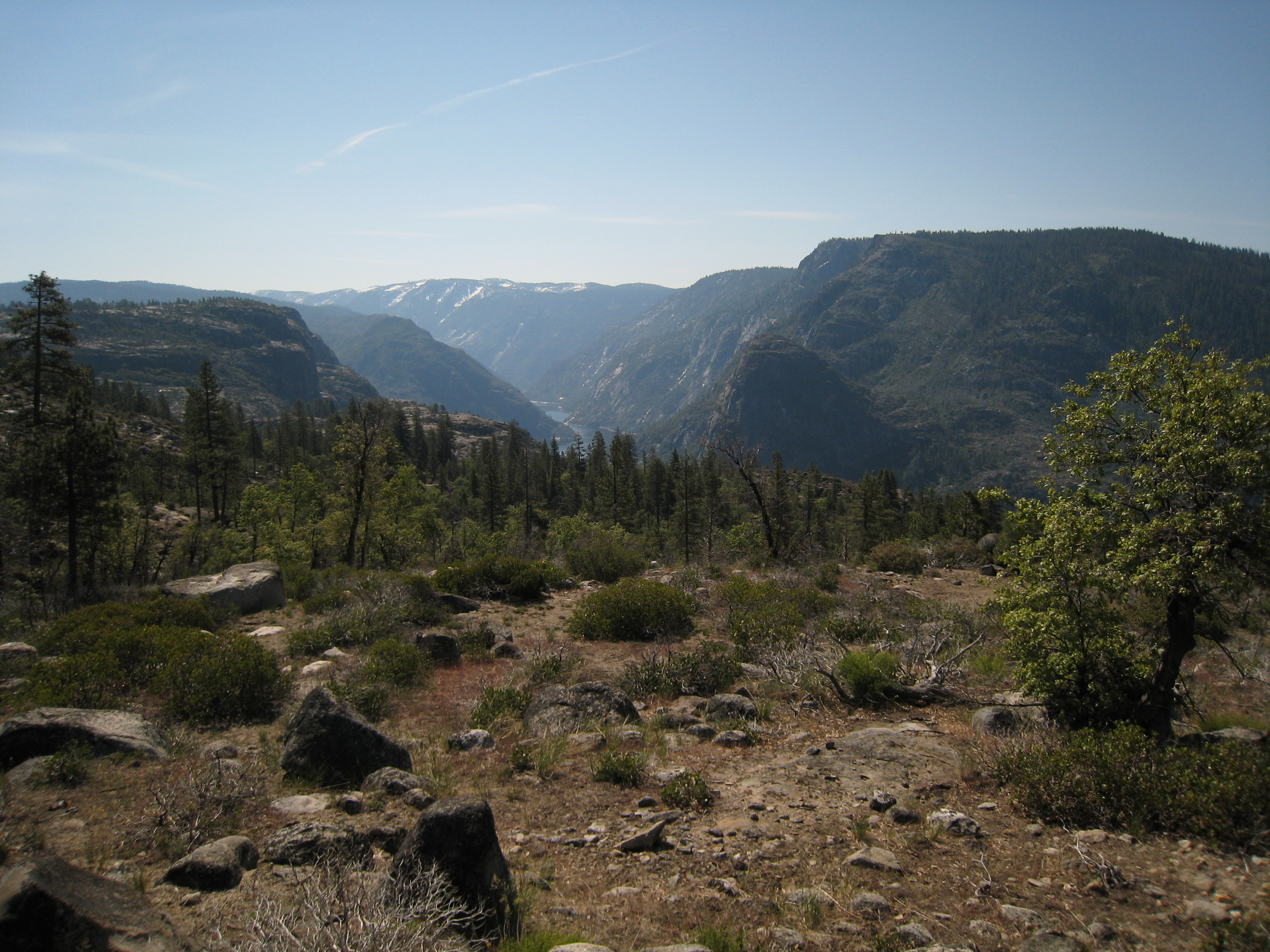
- Hetch Hetchy Dome is on the left

Highest point
- Elevation: 6,197 ft (1,889 m) NAVD 88
- Prominence: 237 ft (72 m)
- Coordinates: 37°57′55″N 119°45′11″W

Geography
- Location within California Location within the United States
- Location: Yosemite National Park, Tuolumne County, California, U.S.
- Parent range: Ritter Range, Sierra Nevada

Hetch Hetchy Dome is a granite dome, in the Hetch Hetchy area of Yosemite National Park.

== On Hetch Hetchy Dome's particulars ==
Aside from being aside Hetch Hetchy Reservoir, Hetch Hetchy Dome is near Kolana Rock.

Hetch Hetchy Dome Dome has a few rock climbing routes.
