= Modesto Irrigation District =

Special-purpose district in Stanislaus County, California

District overview
- Formed: 1887
- Type: Irrigation district
- Headquarters: Modesto, California; 37.6436°N 121.0026°W
- Employees: 412
- Website: www.mid.org

Map

The Modesto Irrigation District (MID) is a special-purpose district that provides irrigation and drinking water, and electrical service, to customers in the San Joaquin Valley within Stanislaus County, California.

It was the second established irrigation district in California, using the resources of the Tuolumne River. The district now supplies irrigation water to 3,100 agricultural customers, electrical service to over 120,000 customers, and drinking water to the city of Modesto.

== History ==
The Modesto Irrigation District was the second irrigation district to be established in California, in July 1887, under the Wright Act of 1887, which allowed the formation of special-purpose districts throughout California. The voters within the district's proposed boundaries were overwhelmingly in favor of the formation, but a determined opposition to the district's formation and taxing authority carried on a legal battle with the district until the US Supreme Court sided with the district in 1898. Anti-irrigationists continued to prevent the collection of taxes until 1901.

The district initially sought to divert water from the Stanislaus River, but ultimately decided that the Tuolumne River was a better source of water. In 1893, the La Grange Dam was completed, enclosing La Grange Reservoir. This small dam provided a diversion point for water delivered to the Turlock Irrigation District, which provided 2/3 of the building cost. After a long delay caused by legal battles, the district finally started providing irrigation water in 1903.

Between 1904 and 1913 the Modesto Irrigation District, Turlock Irrigation District, and the city of San Francisco were embroiled in a dispute over the use of the Tuolumne River. San Francisco needed more drinking water, and the two districts wanted to continue exclusive use of the river. Despite opposition from John Muir and the Sierra Club, San Francisco ultimately prevailed with the passing of the Raker Act, which authorized construction of the O'Shaughnessy Dam on the Tuolumne River, and eventually turned the Hetch Hetchy Valley into the Hetch Hetchy Reservoir. By 1940, San Francisco and the two districts had become allies to develop the Tuolumne River watershed as a source of water and electricity.

In 1911, the Modesto Dam was completed, enclosing the Modesto Reservoir. The first Don Pedro Dam was completed in 1923, enclosing Don Pedro Reservoir. The dam construction costs were divided between the district and the Turlock Irrigation district. In 1971, the second Don Pedro Dam was completed, enlarging the reservoir from 290,000 acre feet to 2,030,000 acre feet.

Electrical service started in 1923, after the Don Pedro Powerhouse connected with the Don Pedro Dam was completed.

In 1978, the district merged with the Waterford Irrigation District.

In 1994, the district started drinking water service to Modesto after the Modesto Regional Water Treatment Plant was completed.

== Reservoirs and dams ==
There are three reservoirs operated by the Modesto Irrigation District:

- Don Pedro Reservoir (New Don Pedro Dam) - 2,030,000 acre feet
- Modesto Reservoir (Modesto Dam) - 29,000 acre feet
- La Grange Reservoir (La Grange Dam) - 500 acre feet

== Other facilities ==
The district operates several major facilities:

- Don Pedro Powerhouse - Electricity Generation
- McClure Generation Station - Electricity Generation
- Ripon Generation Station - Electricity Generation
- Woodland Generation Stations - Electricity Generation
- Stone Drop Generation Station - Electricity Generation
- New Hogan Powerhouse - Electricity Generation
- Modesto Regional Water Treatment Plant - Water Treatment

== Governance and management ==
The Modesto Irrigation District is governed by a Board of Directors. The Board of Directors consists of five members, one from each geographical division of the district. A Board President and Vice President are selected yearly by the board. Daily management is provided by a General Manager and four Assistant General Managers (AGMs)
