= Piute Creek (Tuolumne River tributary) =

Stream in Yosemite National Park, California

- Location of Piute Creek in California

Location
- Country: United States
- State: California

Physical characteristics
- Source: Unnamed lake
  - location: Sierra Nevada
  - coordinates: 38°05′36″N 119°24′04″W
  - elevation: 10,302 ft (3,140 m)
- Mouth: Tuolumne River
  - location: Pate Valley
  - coordinates: 37°55′48″N 119°36′03″W
  - elevation: 4,344 ft (1,324 m)
- Length: 18.87 mi (30.37 km) (Note: Length measured in Google Earth using the path measure tool.)

Piute Creek is a 19-mile (31 km) long stream in northern Yosemite National Park, in Tuolumne County, California. It is a major tributary of the Tuolumne River, draining a rugged and remote area of the Sierra Nevada.

The creek begins at an unnamed lake near Burro Pass and Matterhorn Peak, flowing west then southwest into Slide Canyon. Here, it briefly flows underground through a fallen talus pile known as "The Slide". Below Slide Canyon it receives Camp Creek and Rock Creek then descends steeply southwest into Benson Lake. After emerging from the southern end of the lake it flows through an area known as Pleasant Valley, where it passes the smaller Saddle Horse, Irwin Bright and Table Lakes, then drops over a long series of cascading waterfalls into the Grand Canyon of the Tuolumne. It joins with the Tuolumne River in Pate Valley, about 5 miles (8.0 km) upstream from Hetch Hetchy Reservoir.

Piute Creek has also been known as Cascade Creek and Slide Creek.

== See also ==
- List of rivers of California
