= Tuolumne River Regional Park =

Park in San Joaquin Valley, California, US

Coordinates: 37.6236°N 120.96°W

The Tuolumne River Regional Park is a large urban park under development along a seven-mile (11 km) stretch of the Tuolumne River between the cities of Ceres, California and Modesto, California consisting of 500 acres (0.78 mi^{2}; 2.0 km^{2}) of public grounds in Stanislaus County, California.

== Conservation plans ==
The completed park will contain 150 acres (0.61 km^{2}) of developed parkland among four parks, with 350 acres (1.4 km^{2}) dedicated to riparian habitat restoration and over five miles (8.0 km) of pedestrian/biking trails. When completed, the restoration work and park enhancements will showcase the riparian habitat and improve recreational opportunities for residents and tourists. The park plan was designed with a strong conservation-oriented approach in order to protect and enhance the river, integrating the natural processes that shaped the landscape. The park is envisioned as a setting to learn about the Tuolumne River, natural river processes, native plants, and local wildlife habitat. Small and large group gathering areas, trails, interpretive signage, and a restored landscape will provide and unparalleled opportunity for outdoor study and recreation. The park will provide a mixture of active and passive recreational zones, including play fields and picnic areas, outdoor performing arts, kayaking, nature interpretation, and bicycling.

== History ==
The Riparian forest habitat of the Tuolumne River became a recreational center for the residents of Modesto following the founding of the city in 1870. While initially used for swimming and fishing, the concept of building a formal park along the river can be traced to the 1920s. In 1933, these early plans resulted in the construction of Dennett Dam and the 97-acre (390,000 m^{2}) Lake Modesto at the location of the current TRRP Gateway site. The dam and lake were destroyed in a 1940 flood, though portions of its foundation remain in the river today and are slated for removal. With the start of World War II, plans for the site were largely set aside, and much of the land reverted to agriculture. This remained largely unchanged until the early 1970s when the TRRP was formed. Since that time, several formal parks have been built and the TRRP joint power authority has been acquiring land and funding to complete the project. Construction is underway on new sections of the park, and planning is ongoing for the redevelopment of existing park sites and river side habitat restoration.

== Existing sections ==
The Tuolumne River Regional Park includes several park areas already completed and open for public use. When completed, the TRRP trail system will also link with the adjoining Dry Creek park system and the scenic four miles (6.4 km) of trails and developed parks available in that system and maintained by the City of Modesto.

Mancini Park – Located along the south shore of the Tuolumne River bordering Ceres, Mancini Park was developed on land donated by conductor Frank Mancini. This large park is the subject of current redevelopment efforts, and will be connected to the TRRP trail system through the installation of a pedestrian/bicycle bridge across the river. This park offers walking, bicycling, picnic, and children's play opportunities.

Beard Brook Park – Located along Dry Creek just upstream from the Tuolumne River, Beard Brook Park offers a developed play area and baseball fields.

Legion Park – Established in the 1970s, this sprawling park contains a mixture of mature riparian forest, outdoor recreation areas, and picnic areas. Legion Park is envisioned as the educational center of the park and will receive a restored wildflower meadow, a recreation and kayaking beach, and a new trail network.

Bellenita Park – Bellenita, is a small lightly developed neighborhood park set back from the river's primary flood channel. This park will be redeveloped and integrated into a larger regional sports complex extending from Thomas Avenue to Sutter Avenue in the unincorporated county areas south of Modesto.

== Future sections ==
Gateway Park – Located at the foot of downtown Modesto, the Gateway Park is a 90-acre (360,000 m^{2}) former orchard at the confluence of Dry Creek and the Tuolumne River. This park will contain a mixture of developed parkland, restored riparian terraces, and recreational opportunities.

Airport Park – The 140-acre (0.57 km^{2}) airport area will place emphasis on the bicycle and pedestrian trail, and the beauty and habitat value of this mature riparian corridor.

RiverWalk Trail – This seven miles (11 km) long trail, and the ribbon of riparian parkland surrounding it, will link the larger formally developed parks along the length of the TRRP project.

== Governance ==
The Tuolumne River Regional Park is directed through the use of a Joint Powers Authority between Stanislaus County, the city of Ceres, and the city of Modesto. The TRRP is overseen by the TRRP Commission, which includes elected representatives from the associated governments, and the TRRP Citizens Advisory Committee, which includes citizen representatives appointed by the governments involved in the JPA.

TRRP is a member of the Tuolumne River Coalition. The TRC represents various public agencies, non-profit organizations and special interest groups dedicated to the enhancement and preservation of the lower 52-mile (84 km) stretch of the Tuolumne River from LaGrange Dam to the confluence of the Tuolumne and San Joaquin rivers.
