= Return Creek =

- Location of Return Creek in California

Location
- Country: United States
- State: California

Physical characteristics
- Source: Sierra Nevada
  - coordinates: 38°04′51″N 119°21′18″W
  - elevation: 11,938 ft (3,639 m)
- Mouth: Tuolumne River
  - coordinates: 37°55′55″N 119°27′58″W
  - elevation: 6,204 ft (1,891 m)
- Length: 12.96 mi (20.86 km)

Return Creek is a stream in the northeast part of Yosemite National Park, in Tuolumne County, California, and is a tributary of the Tuolumne River. About 13 miles (21 km) in length, it is the first major tributary to join downstream of Tuolumne Meadows. The creek begins at Return Lake on the Sierra Crest, near Virginia Pass, and flows initially east before turning southwest and joining with McCabe Creek and Spiller Creek. On its path to the Tuolumne River the creek has carved out the 2,000-foot (610 m) deep Virginia Canyon, which was enlarged to its present shape by glaciation. After its confluence with Matterhorn Creek it flows south-southwest to its confluence with the Tuolumne River, about a quarter mile (400 m) below Waterwheel Falls.

The Pacific Crest Trail follows part of Virginia Canyon and crosses Return Creek just above the confluence of McCabe Creek.

Return Creek has also been labeled, on early maps, as the North Fork of the Tuolumne River. This is not to be confused with the actual North Fork Tuolumne River, located much further to the west.
