= Camp Creek (Tuolumne County, California) =

Stream in Yosemite National Park, U.S.

Coordinates: 38°02′53″N 119°27′49″W

Camp Creek is a stream in Yosemite National Park, United States. It is a tributary of Piute Creek which is a tributary of the Tuolumne River. Camp Creek head waters start along the southside of Doghead Peak and head west.

Camp Creek was so likely so named when a United States Geological Survey topographer camped there.

== See also ==
- List of rivers of California
