= New Don Pedro Dam =

Dam in California

The New Don Pedro Dam
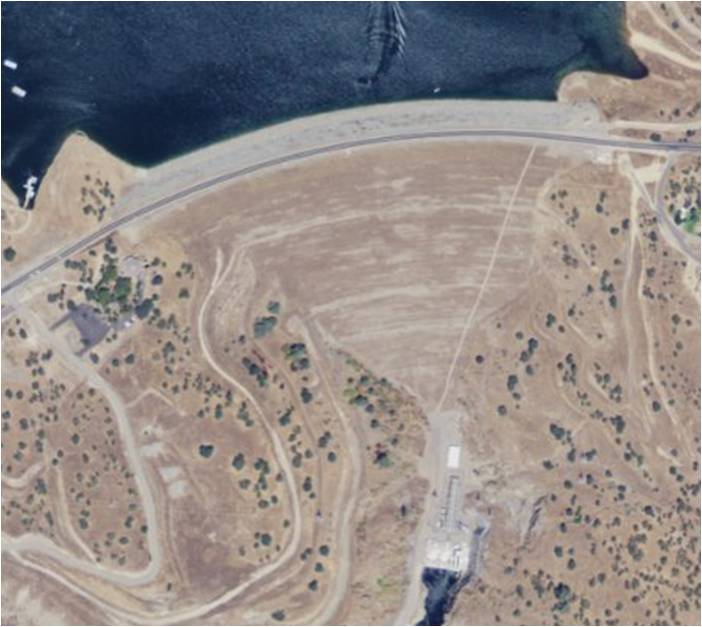
- Aerial view of New Don Pedro Dam
- Interactive map of The New Don Pedro Dam
- Country: United States
- Location: Tuolumne County, near La Grange, California
- Coordinates: 37°41′58″N 120°25′15″W
- Construction began: 1967; 59 years ago
- Opening date: 1971; 55 years ago
- Owners: Modesto Irrigation District and Turlock Irrigation District

Dam and spillways
- Type of dam: Embankment
- Impounds: Tuolumne River
- Height: 585 ft (178 m)
- Length: 1,900 ft (580 m)
- Elevation at crest: 855 ft (261 m)
- Width (crest): 40 ft (12 m)
- Dam volume: 16,750,000 yd^{3} (12,810,000 m^{3})
- Spillway type: Controlled overflow

Reservoir
- Creates: Lake Don Pedro
- Total capacity: 2,030,000 acre⋅ft (2.50 km^{3})
- Catchment area: 1,542 mi^{2} (3,990 km^{2})
- Surface area: 12,960 acres (5,240 ha)
- Normal elevation: 830 ft (250 m) (max)

Power Station
- Hydraulic head: 560 ft (170 m)
- Turbines: 3 x 55MW, 1 x 38MW Francis-type
- Installed capacity: 203 MW
- Annual generation: 552,381,000 kWh (2001–2012)

New Don Pedro Dam, often known simply as Don Pedro Dam, is an earthen embankment dam across the Tuolumne River, about 2 miles (3.2 km) northeast of La Grange, in Tuolumne County, California. The dam was completed in 1971, after four years of construction, to replace the 1924 concrete-arch Don Pedro Dam.

The dam serves mainly for irrigation water storage, flood control and hydroelectricity production, and impounds Don Pedro Reservoir in the foothills of the Sierra Nevada.

The New Don Pedro Dam is owned and operated by the Modesto Irrigation District (MID) and Turlock Irrigation District (TID). At 585 feet (178 m) tall, the dam is the tenth highest in the U.S. and its reservoir is the sixth largest artificial lake in California.

The original dam was named for the old mining town of Don Pedros Bar on the Tuolumne River, which in turn takes its name from prospector Pierre "Don Pedro" Sainsevain.

== Background ==
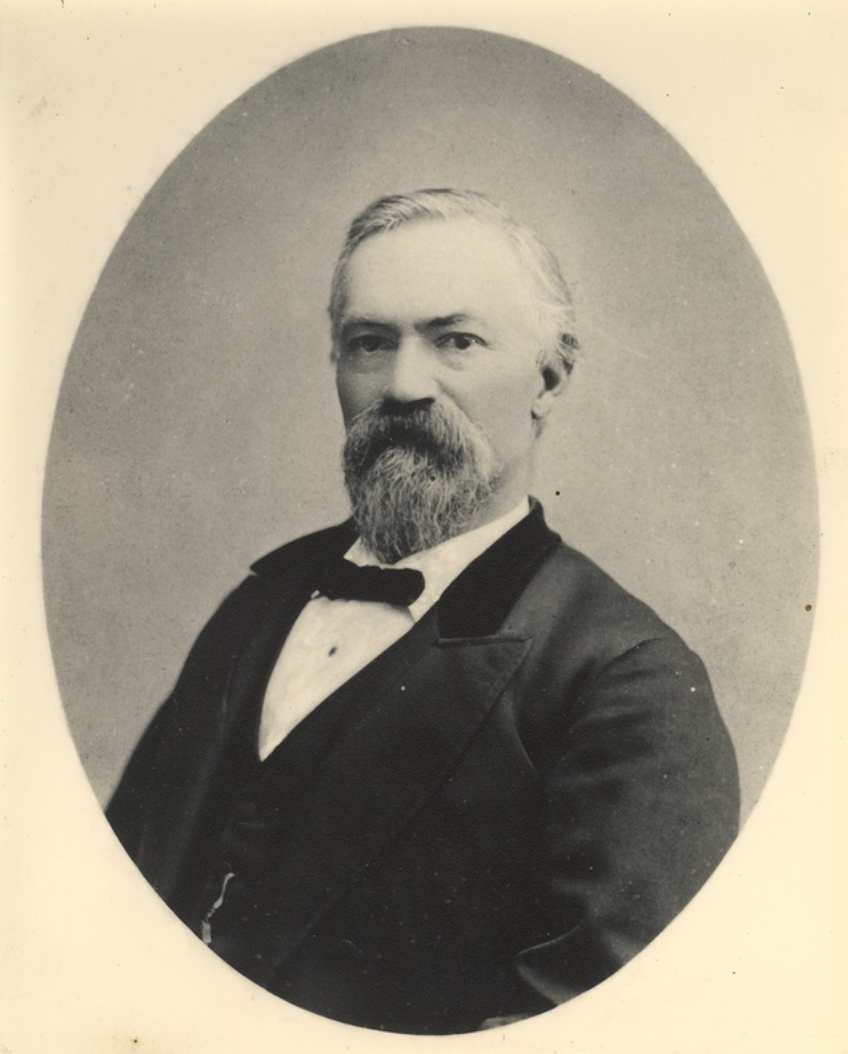
Don Pedro Dam is named after Don Pedro Sainsevain.

Shortly after their formation in 1887, the MID and TID acquired water rights to the Tuolumne River to secure a water supply for their combined 1,000-square-mile (2,600 km^{2}) service area in the San Joaquin Valley. After selling revenue bonds totaling $4.1 million, the two irrigation districts began construction of the Don Pedro Dam (now known as Old Don Pedro Dam) in 1921, about one and a half miles (2.4 km) upriver of the present location of New Don Pedro Dam. Upon its completion in 1923, this 284-foot (87 m) concrete gravity arch dam was the highest dam in the world, forming a 289,000-acre-foot (0.356 km^{3}) reservoir with a surface area of 3,086 acres (1,249 ha). The dam's 15 megawatt (MW) hydroelectric plant, later expanded to 37.5 MW, delivered its first power in October 1923.

Expanding Don Pedro or constructing a new dam altogether was first seriously considered in the 1940s because the existing dam could only store a year's supply of water for valley farmers, with no guarantee that a multiyear drought could be weathered. An enlarged Don Pedro would provide a "bank" of water storage for prolonged droughts, capture more spring runoff, and provide increased flood control. Another proponent of a high dam was the city of San Francisco, which also sought a share of the Tuolumne's water and decided to cooperate with the irrigation districts to construct the new dam. The U.S. Bureau of Reclamation made tentative studies for a high dam on the Tuolumne River as part of its Central Valley Project, though it later dropped the plans in favor of other sites.

== Construction ==
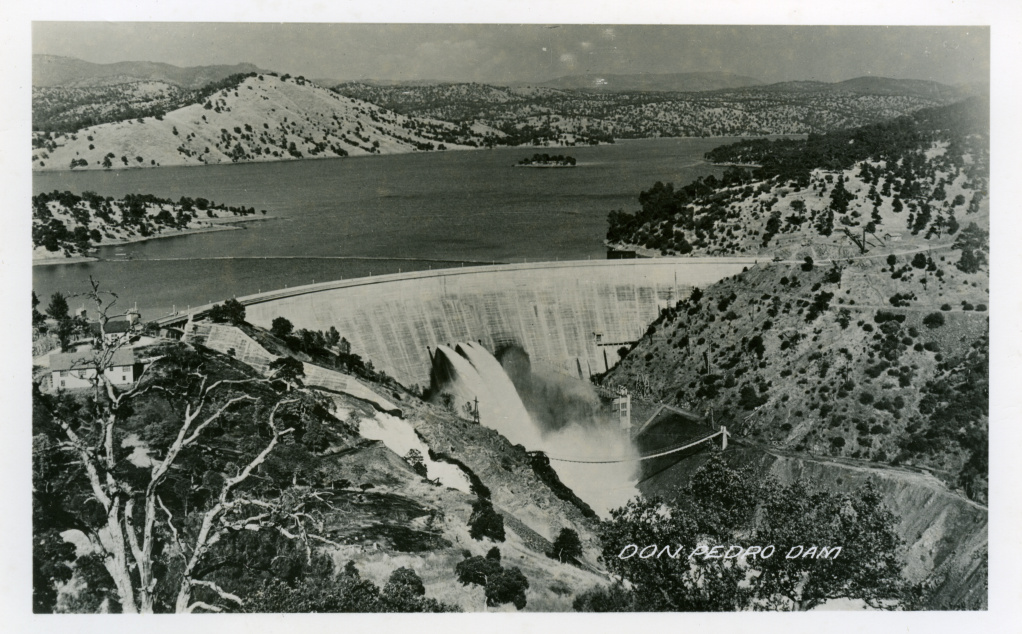
The first Don Pedro Dam, later to be submerged under the new reservoir

In 1961, an overwhelming majority of voters in the TID and MID service areas and San Francisco approved bond issues to finance the construction of a new dam. The irrigation districts hoped to complete the dam by 1966, but concerns that the dam would further impact decreasing populations of king salmon in the Tuolumne put a temporary stop to the project. In fact, it was not until that year that the Federal Power Commission (now Federal Energy Regulatory Commission) licensed the irrigation districts to go ahead on New Don Pedro.

The $49.7 million primary construction contract for the dam was awarded to Guy F. Atkinson Company on August 22, 1967. When he first saw the dam site, chief engineer John Goodier was reported to have said "[it'd be a] tough nut to crack". Clearing the dam site began immediately afterwards, in addition to the construction of access roads and a camp for construction workers. Construction of the dam's service spillway began a week later on August 29. On September 22, 1967, work began on the diversion tunnel that would allow the river to bypass the construction site. The 3,415-foot (1,041 m) tunnel was fully excavated by March 13 of the following year and lined with reinforced concrete by August. On September 7, a 40-foot (12 m) cofferdam was constructed and the diversion tunnel began to carry the flow of the Tuolumne. As the dam site dried out, the foundations were excavated down to bedrock; cracks in the rock were injected with so-called "dental concrete" to stabilize the foundation.

Construction of the embankment began on September 16, 1968, the dam embankment was placed using bottom dump trailers manufactured by Athey and compacted with rubber tired and vibrating rollers. The dam's massive concrete emergency spillway was completed on January 19, 1969. However, severe flooding on January 26 destroyed the cofferdam and all of the construction site's bridges, putting work a month behind schedule. Cleanup proceeded at a rapid pace and placing of impervious material for the dam's core commenced on February 27. For the next fifteen months, a fleet of massive 125-ton (113 t) dump trucks delivered an almost constant stream of dirt and rock to the site, and the dam wall rose at an average rate of one and a half feet (0.46 m) per day. The workforce peaked at 500 men in mid-1969 and on December 10, the service spillway was completed. On May 28, 1970, the embankment was finally topped out with the last of over 250,000 truckloads of material.

After the clearing of over 7,000 acres (2,800 ha) of the future reservoir site and the relocation of several roads that ran through it, the diversion tunnel was closed and water began to rise behind New Don Pedro. The rising lake submerged Old Don Pedro Dam on April 12, 1970 and inundated the Gold Rush town of Jacksonville by June. The powerhouse and penstocks were completed by August 1970, after lengthy delays and setbacks due to the sheer scale of the generators, pipes and gates used in their construction. Some of the individual components were so heavy that a truck delivering one of the penstock sections sank up to its trailer bed in the road, and another was crushed when the driver braked, inadvertently snapping the chains that held the load in place.

"We have harnessed a great river to serve man. There is a vision, imagination, sense of beauty about it. Environment and development will never meet, but a delicate balance of the two has been achieved at Don Pedro Dam."

— Joseph Alioto, mayor of San Francisco, at 1971 New Don Pedro Dam dedication

The total cost of the New Don Pedro Dam project, including site preparations, reservoir clearing and road relocations, was $115,679,000. The dam was formally dedicated on May 22, 1971 to a crowd of over 3,000 people. Among the dedication ceremonies were a speech by San Francisco mayor Joseph Alioto and a beef barbecue hosted by TID.

== Design and usage ==
Rising 585 feet (178 m) above its foundations and 560 feet (170 m) above the Tuolumne River, New Don Pedro is a massive earth and rock fill structure containing 16,750,000 cubic yards (12,810,000 m^{3}) of material. The 1,900-foot (580 m) long dam is 40 feet (12 m) wide at the crest and over 2,800 feet (850 m) wide at the base. High water releases are controlled by four sets of gates. A set of internal gates in the diversion tunnel can release up to 7,370 cubic feet per second (209 m^{3}/s), while a hollow jet valve at the base of the dam can discharge 3,100 cubic feet per second (88 m^{3}/s). The service spillway, controlled by three 45-by-30-foot (13.7 m × 9.1 m) radial gates, has a capacity of 172,000 cubic feet per second (4,900 m^{3}/s), and finally the emergency spillway, a 995-foot (303 m) long concrete overflow structure, can discharge more than 300,000 cubic feet per second (8,500 m^{3}/s).

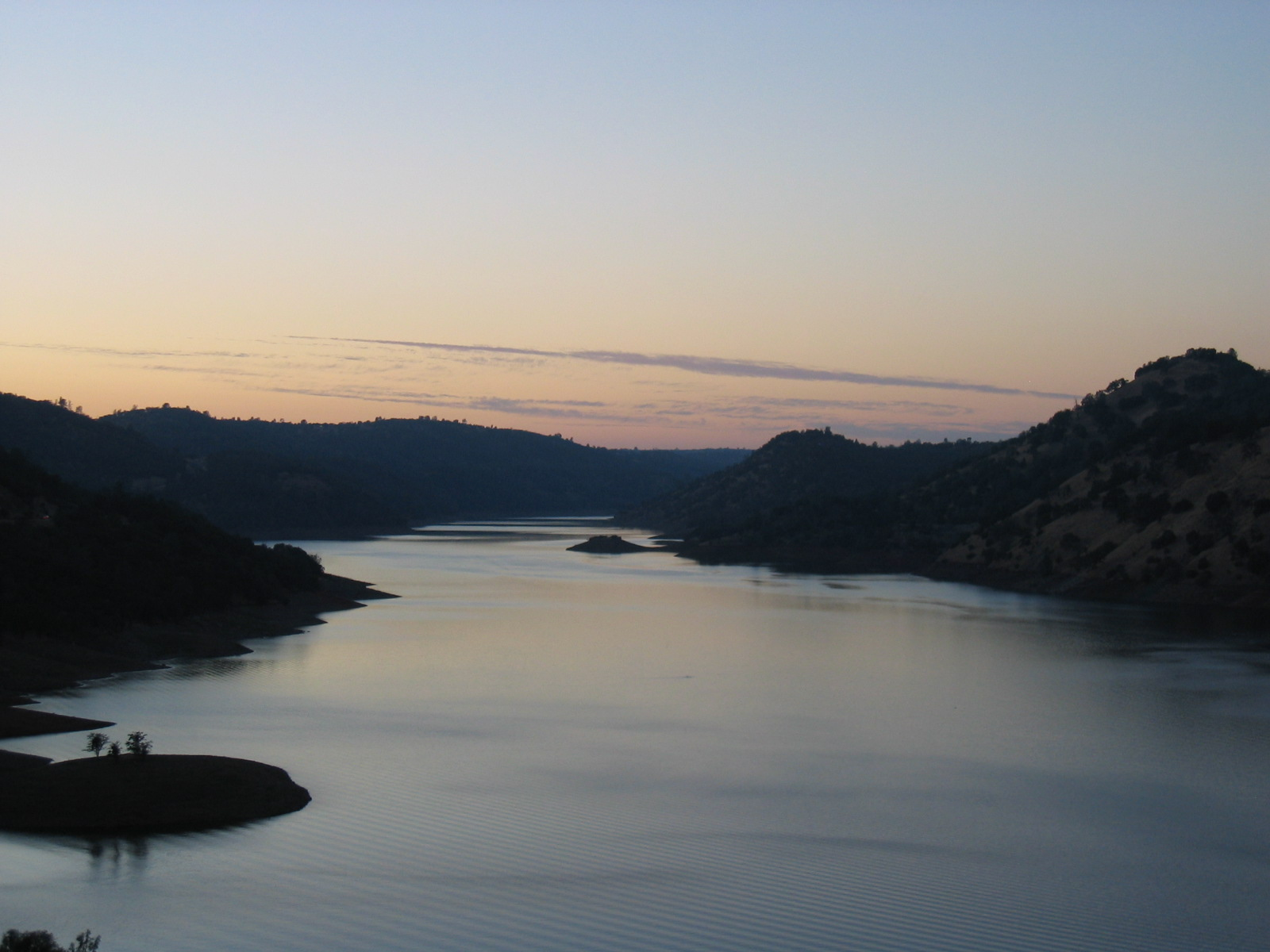
Don Pedro Reservoir is seen at near full capacity in 2005

The hydroelectric plant at the base of the dam has four generators capable of producing 203 MW combined. The TID's share is 139 MW or 68.47%, while MID receives 64 MW or 31.53%. Three generators, each with a capacity of 55 MW, were included in the original design of the dam while an additional 38 MW generator was incorporated in 1989. The plant generates an average of 618.4 million kilowatt hours (KWh) of electricity each year, equal to an average output of 70.6 MW. The cities of Modesto and Turlock receive a large share of their power supplies from New Don Pedro Dam.

Don Pedro Reservoir has a capacity of 2,030,000 acre-feet (2.50 km^{3}), of which 340,000 acre-feet (0.42 km^{3}) is reserved for flood control and 1,381,000 acre-feet (1.703 km^{3}) is available for irrigation, municipal water supply, and hydroelectric generation. The flood control reservation is one of the smallest among major California reservoirs because it allows for more water to be stored for power generation, but this has often resulted in inadequate flood protection such as in 1997 when the dam released more than 50,000 cubic feet per second (1,400 m^{3}/s) – almost six times the capacity of downstream levees. The bottom 309,000 acre-feet (0.381 km^{3}) is considered dead storage, or the lowest point at which water can be released to generate power. At an elevation of 804 feet (245 m) (service spillway crest), the reservoir is 25 miles (40 km) long, and has an area of 12,960 acres (5,240 ha) with 160 miles (260 km) of shoreline. The maximum elevation of the reservoir at the crest of the emergency spillway is 830 feet (250 m) above sea level.

During construction of the dam, it was anticipated that the large size and scenic location of the reservoir, coupled with its proximity to urban centers, would make it a large tourist draw. A $40,000 plan was put forth to develop the reservoir for recreational activities. This entailed the construction of campsites, picnic areas, boat ramps, a landing strip, and hiking trails, including on 14 of the 33 islands in the lake. Don Pedro has become a popular summer destination in Central California, attracting 360,000–400,000 visitors each year.

== Future development ==
In 1923, the same year that Old Don Pedro was completed, the City of San Francisco finished construction of O'Shaughnessy Dam, which forms a reservoir in the upper Tuolumne River's Hetch Hetchy Valley and is the focus of one of the most longstanding environmental controversies in United States history. Proponents of the dam's removal, including former Sierra Club president David Brower, suggest raising New Don Pedro Dam to replace the storage that would be lost with the draining of Hetch Hetchy. Increasing the height of New Don Pedro by just 20 feet (6.1 m) would add about 360,000 acre-feet (0.44 km^{3}) to the reservoir's storage capacity, replacing most of the storage in Hetch Hetchy, though new tunnels would have to be built to deliver water from Don Pedro Reservoir to the Hetch Hetchy Aqueduct and there would be a net loss of hydroelectric generation from O'Shaughnessy. Of note is that San Francisco is already entitled to 453,000 acre-feet (0.559 km^{3}) of the water stored in Don Pedro, although this allocation is overruled by the senior water rights of the irrigation districts during dry years.

TID is currently investigating the feasibility of constructing a large pumped-storage hydroelectric plant on Lake Don Pedro in order to better meet peaking power demands without releasing extra water at New Don Pedro Dam. The proposed Red Mountain Bar Project would involve building a 465-foot (142 m) high dam across a canyon adjacent to Lake Don Pedro, creating a reservoir with a capacity of 25,000 to 42,000 acre-feet (0.031 to 0.052 km^{3}). Water would be pumped into this new reservoir using power generated at New Don Pedro Dam during periods of low electricity demand, while during high demand water would be released through a penstock to an 880 MW generating facility. As of September 2011, poor economic conditions had put the project "on hold indefinitely".

== See also ==
- La Grange Dam
- List of dams and reservoirs in California
- List of largest reservoirs of California
- List of power stations in California
- List of the tallest dams in the United States
- Raker Act

== Works cited ==
- Baggese, Carl P. (2009). Modesto. Images of America. Arcadia Publishing. ISBN 978-0-7385-7150-8.
- International Commission on Large Dams (ICOLD) (1998). Lessons From Dam Incidents, USA-II. American Society of Civil Engineers. ISBN 0-87262-661-X.
- Righter, Robert (2005). The battle over Hetch Hetchy: America's most controversial dam and the birth of modern environmentalism. Oxford University Press. ISBN 0-19-514947-5.
- William De Roos, Robert (2000). The Thirsty Land: The Story of the Central Valley Project. Beard Books. ISBN 1-58798-024-X.
