= Don Pedro Dam =

Remnant dam in California

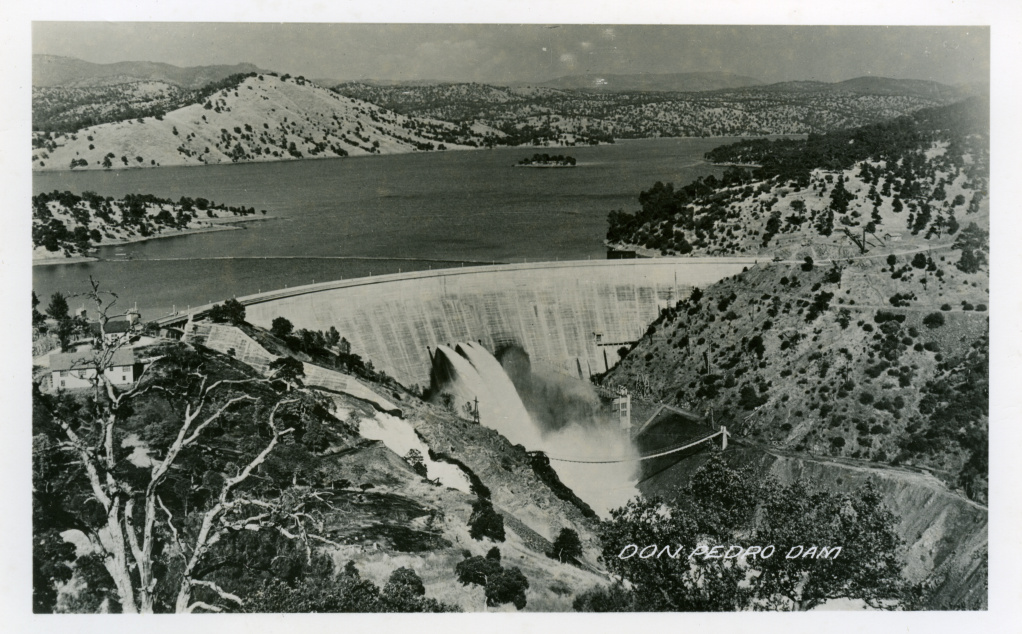
- Old Don Pedro Dam and reservoir, circa 1925
- Interactive map of Don Pedro Dam
- Official name: Old Don Pedro Dam
- Location: Tuolumne County, California
- Coordinates: 37.7125°N 120.4020°W
- Opening date: 1924; 102 years ago

Dam and spillways
- Type of dam: Concrete thick arch/gravity
- Impounds: Tuolumne River
- Height: 283 ft (86 m)
- Length: 1,000 ft (300 m)
- Width (crest): 16 ft (4.9 m)
- Width (base): 170 ft (52 m)

Reservoir
- Creates: Don Pedro Reservoir
- Total capacity: 290,400 acre⋅ft (358,200,000 m^{3})

Power Station
- Turbines: 4
- Installed capacity: 30 MW

The Don Pedro Dam, since 1971 also known as the Old Don Pedro Dam, was a dam across the Tuolumne River in Tuolumne County, California. The structure still exists and is flooded underneath Don Pedro Reservoir, which is formed by the New Don Pedro Dam.

== Construction ==
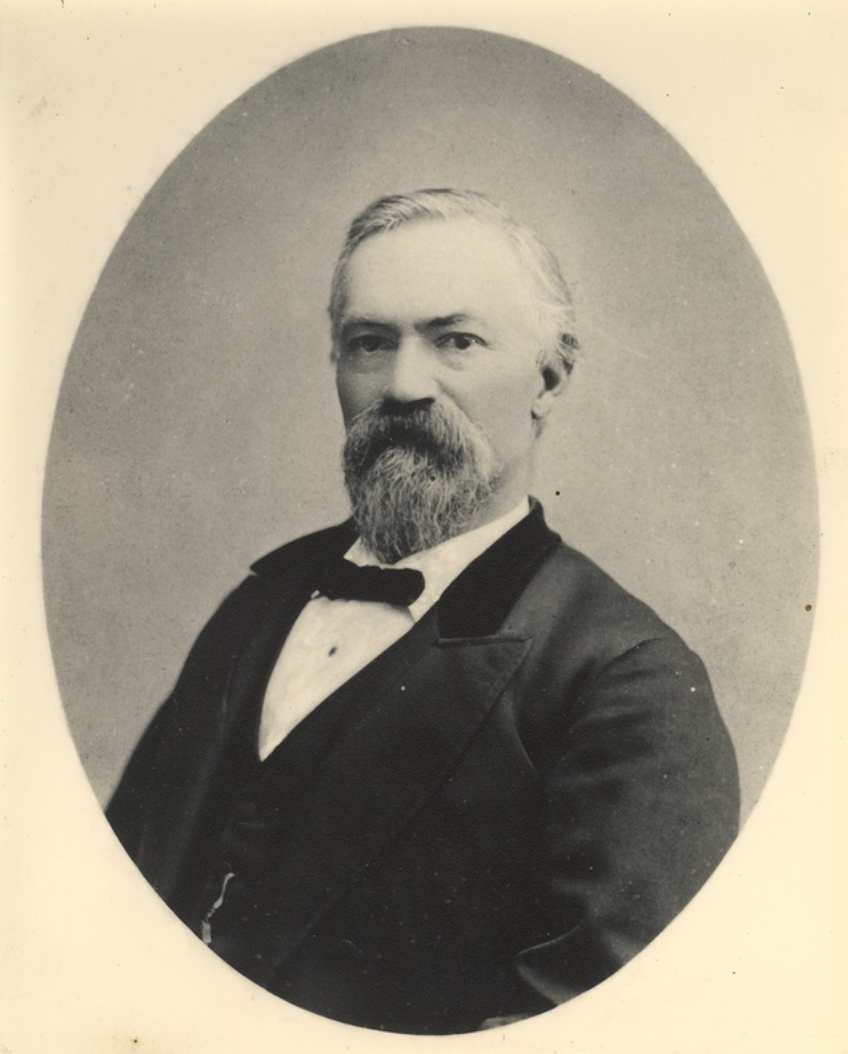
Don Pedro Dam is named after Don Pedro Sainsevain.

It was a solid concrete gravity dam that was 283 ft (86 m) high, 1,000 ft (300 m) wide, 16 ft (4.9 m) thick at the crest, and 170 ft (52 m) thick at the base. It was completed in 1923 where the Tuolumne River had carved a narrow gorge with walls of solid rock about a mile (2 km) below Don Pedro Bar. The reservoir created by this dam contained 290,400 acre⋅ft (358,200,000 m^{3}) of water when full, 14.3% of today's capacity.

A 15 megawatt power plant was part of the dam's original design, and two more 7500 kilowatt generators were added in 1926 for 30 megawatts total, just 15% of today's capacity. The old dam still exists about 1.5 mi (2.4 km) upstream from the new 1971 dam, and since the old dam topped out at just 580 ft (180 m) above sea level it is now under some 250 ft (76 m) of water when the new reservoir is full.
