= Grand Canyon of the Tuolumne =

Canyon carved by the Tuolumne River in California, United States

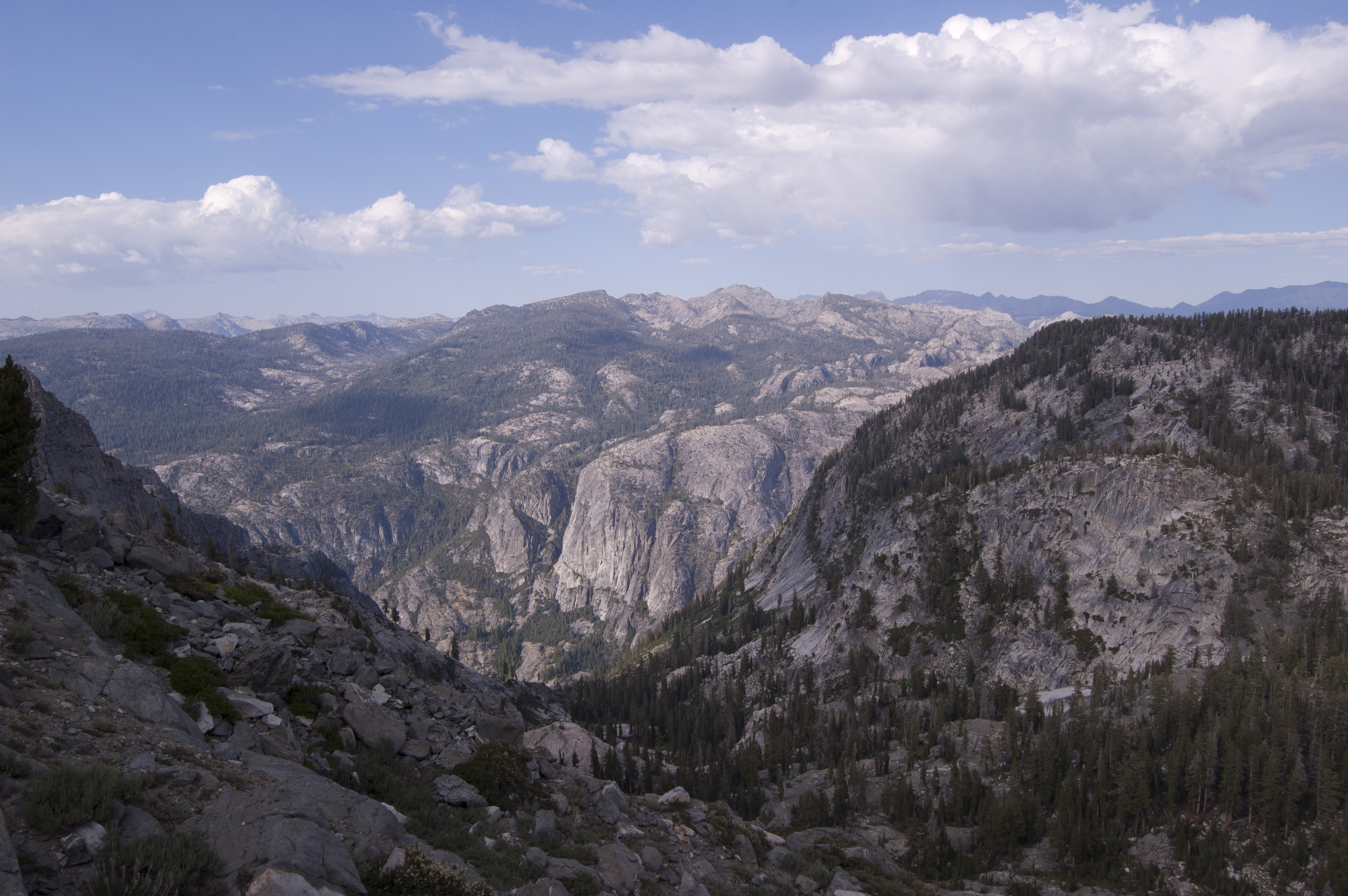
- The Grand Canyon of the Tuolumne, looking west. Muir Gorge cuts diagonally across the middleground.

- Location within California
- Floor elevation: 3,957 ft (1,206 m)

Geography
- Location: Sierra Nevada, California, United States
- Coordinates: 37°56′45″N 119°31′04″W
- Interactive map of Grand Canyon of the Tuolumne

The Grand Canyon of the Tuolumne is the notable canyon section of the river valley of the Tuolumne River, located within Yosemite National Park, in Tuolumne County and the Sierra Nevada, California.

As defined by the United States Geological Survey, the canyon begins at Glen Aulin and ends directly above Hetch Hetchy Valley.

== Geography ==
The Grand Canyon of the Tuolumne starts at Glen Aulin, immediately below the confluence of Cold Canyon, Conness Creek, and the Tuolumne River. Here, the valley walls pull away from each other and become steeper. The water meanders and forms deep pools. After the waterfall that marks the end of Glen Aulin, the canyon becomes deeper again, and roughly V-shaped in cross section. The walls are not as steep and bare as those of Yosemite Valley. The flora of the valley bottom is a haphazard melange of chaparral, manzanita scrub and oak woodland characteristic of the foothills and lowlands with a coniferous forest reminiscent of (but different from) that found above the canyon rim. This vegetation clings and clambers up every ledge of the valley walls to the top, giving it a lusher appearance than Yosemite Valley, though this area in fact experiences a drier climate.

Many dramatic waterfalls are found in the Grand Canyon of the Tuolumne. Whereas Yosemite Valley's celebrated falls occur on tributary streams along the sides, these lie on the main river itself. Many watercourses do join the Tuolumne River, but their canyons form deep clefts in the sides of the Grand Canyon and descend to its bottom. The Tuolumne's own bed, beginning even above Glen Aulin, is fashioned as a great staircase punctuated by waterfalls.

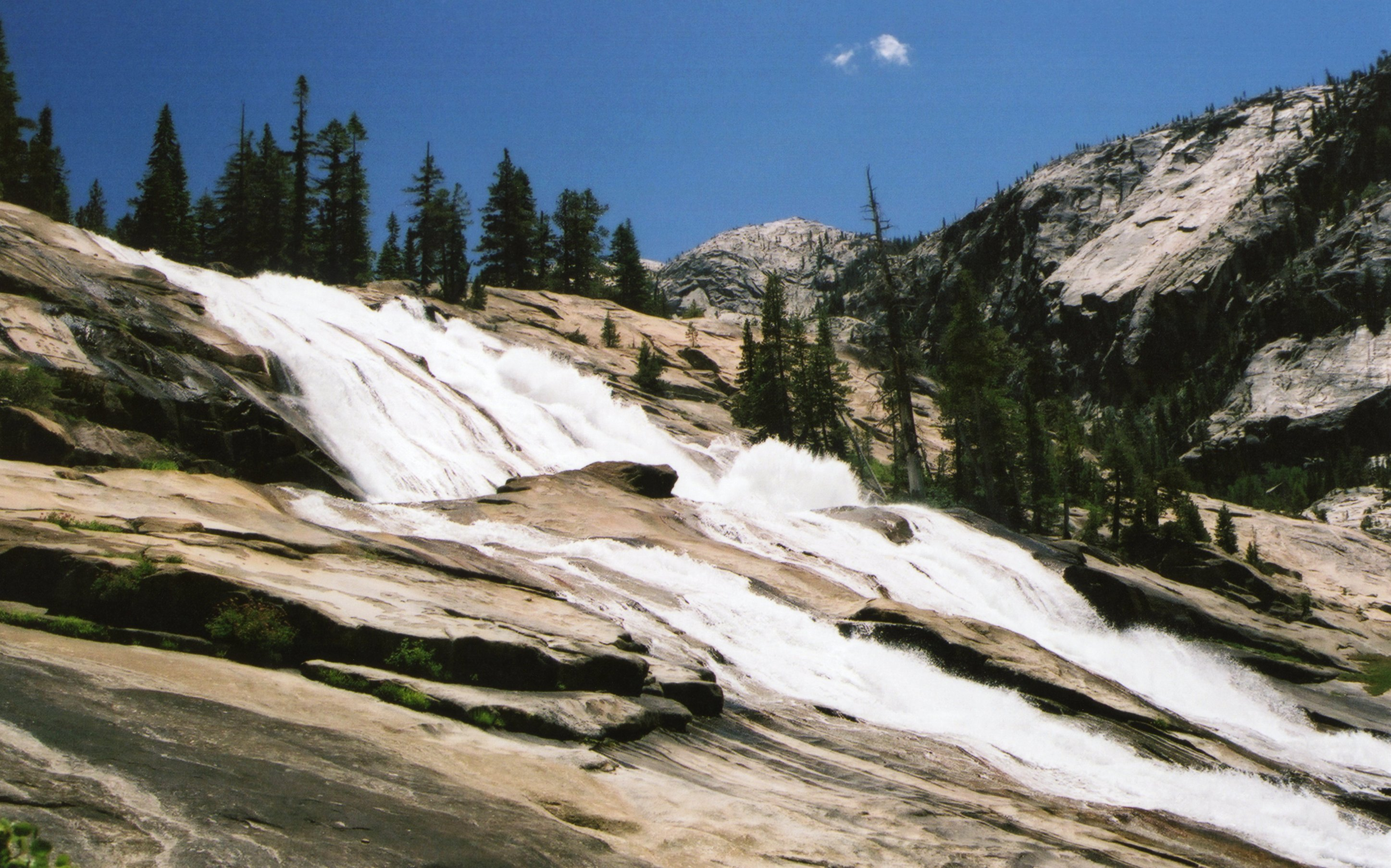
Waterwheel Falls

Perhaps the greatest of these is 800-foot (240 m) Waterwheel Falls, named for a dramatic circular plume of water that appears when the river and the winds run high. A few kilometres below Glen Aulin, the walls of the lower canyon pinch together to form a narrow chasm of less than 1 kilometre (0.62 mi) in length, the Muir Gorge. A short way below the Muir Gorge, the Grand Canyon widens again, much as it does at Glen Aulin, though here it is deeper. This broad plain bears the name of "Pate Valley." Some 6 kilometres (3.7 mi) below here, Hetch Hetchy Reservoir (created by O’Shaughnessy Dam) claims the Tuolumne River.

== Recreation ==
A trail runs along the Tuolumne River from its headwaters to below Pate Valley (though it leaves the valley floor for some time to avoid the impassable Muir Gorge). It is diligently built, but due to the nature of the terrain it is often rocky, steep and generally difficult. The walking distance from the Tioga Road to the Glen Aulin High Sierra Camp is roughly 10 kilometres (6.2 mi) . White Wolf campground, southeast of Hetch Hetchy Reservoir, is within day-hiking distance of the canyon rim, but the return trip from the very bottom is long and steep. Between the eastern tip of the reservoir and the point where the trail begins the climb to White Wolf, the valley is a trackless wilderness.
