= Glen Aulin =

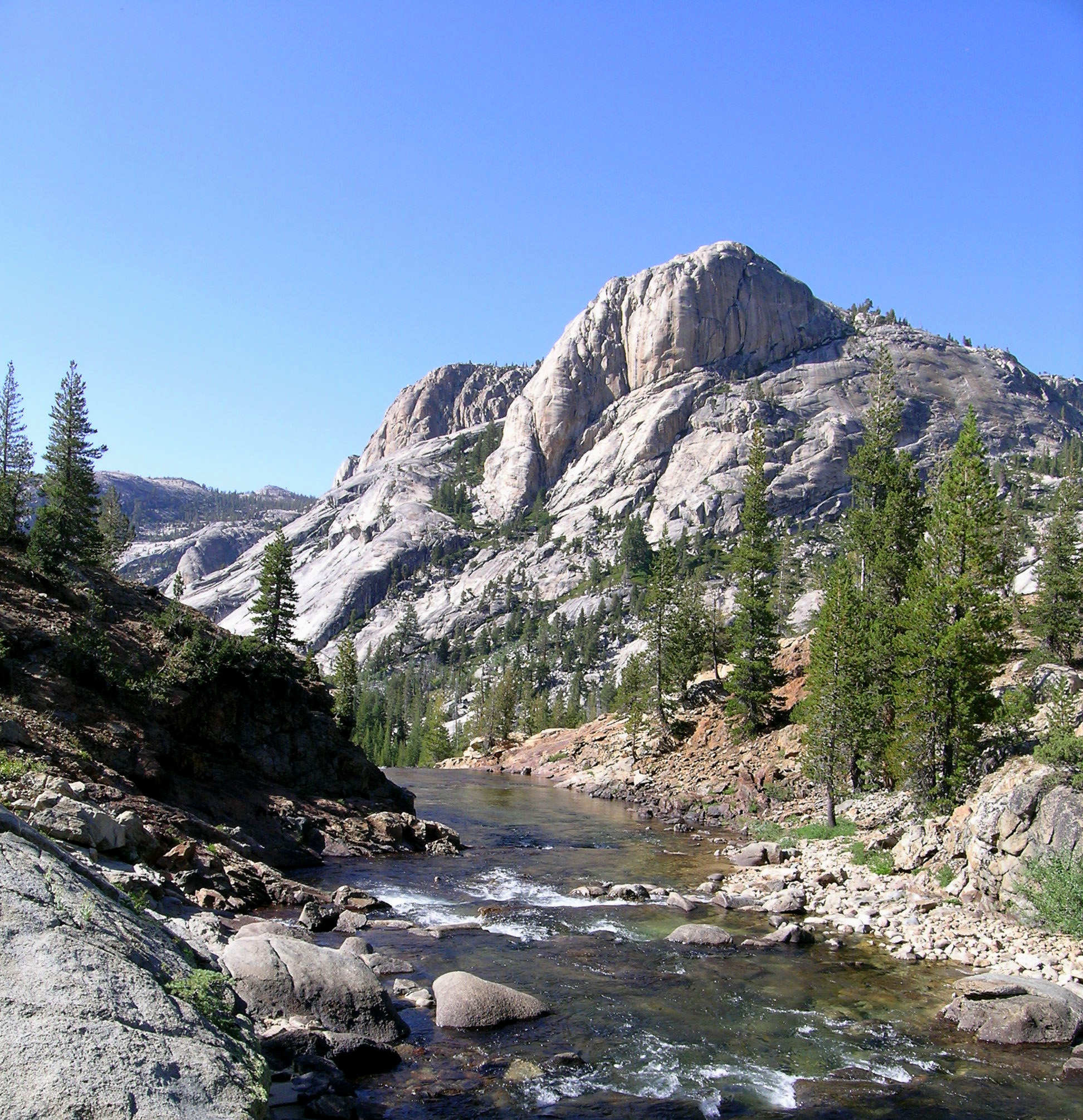
- The Tuolumne River just above Glen Aulin

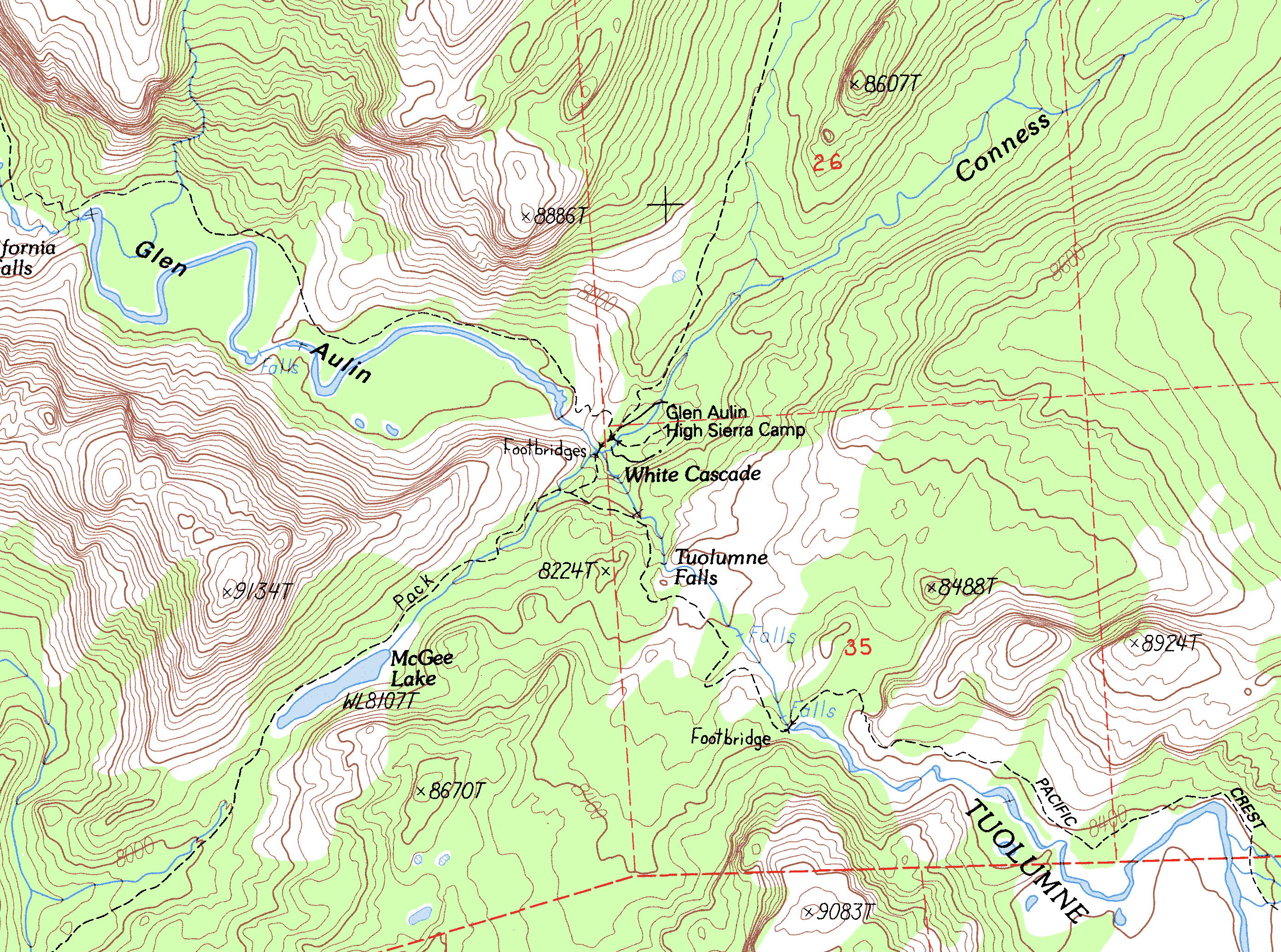
- Topographic Map of the Glen Aulin area
- Floor elevation: 7,800 ft (2,400 m)
- Length: 1 mile (1.6 km)

Geography
- Coordinates: 37°54′42″N 119°25′29″W

Glen Aulin is a segment of the Tuolumne River valley, upriver from the Grand Canyon of the Tuolumne. Glen Aulin is home to the Glen Aulin High Sierra Camp. The name, meaning beautiful valley or glen ("Gleann Alainn" in Gaelic), was suggested by James McCormick of the United States Geographic Board to R.B. Marshall of the USGS.
