= Tuolumne River =

River from Yosemite to the San Joaquin Valley, California

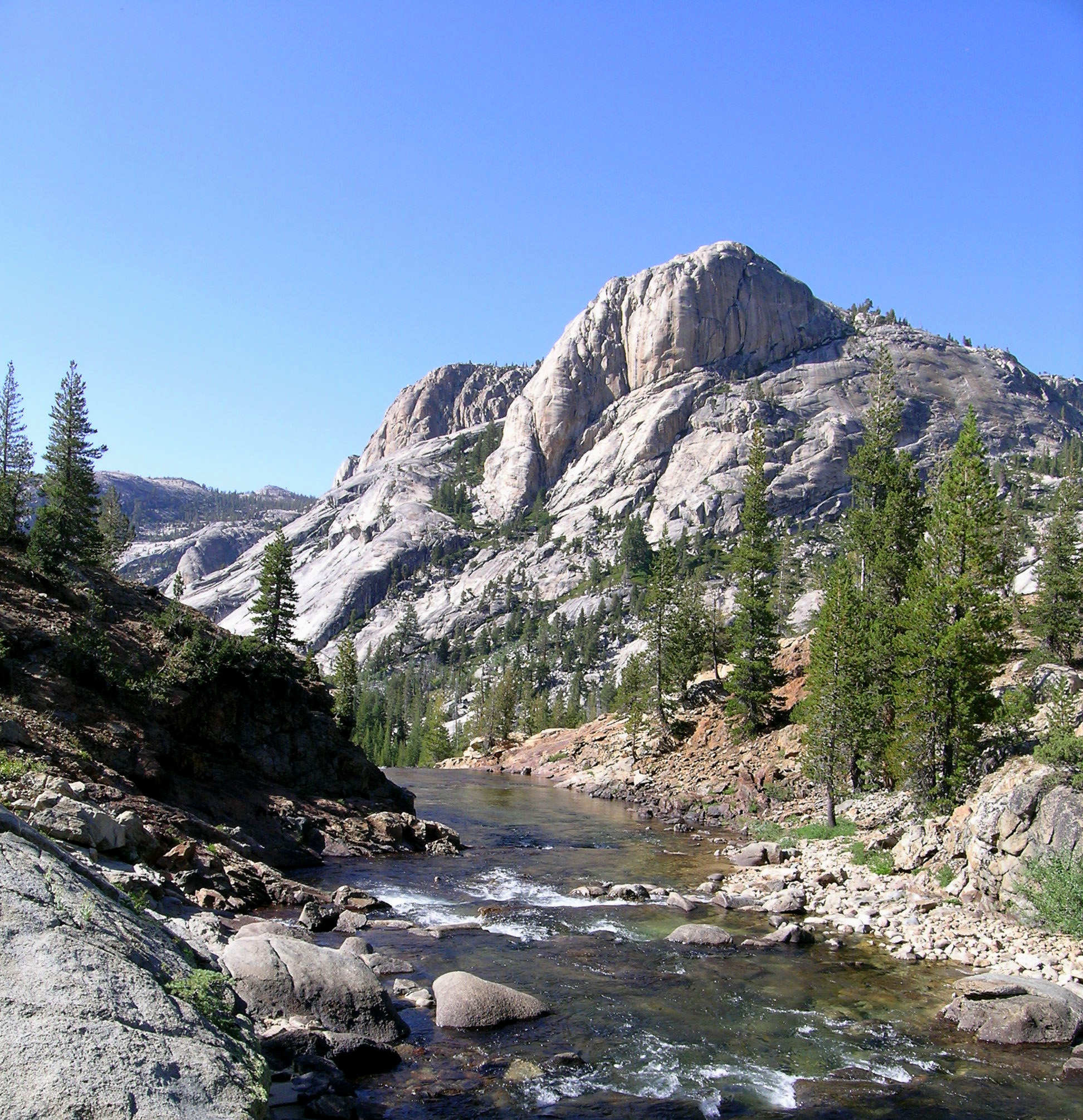
- The Tuolumne River at Glen Aulin valley, below Tuolumne Meadows

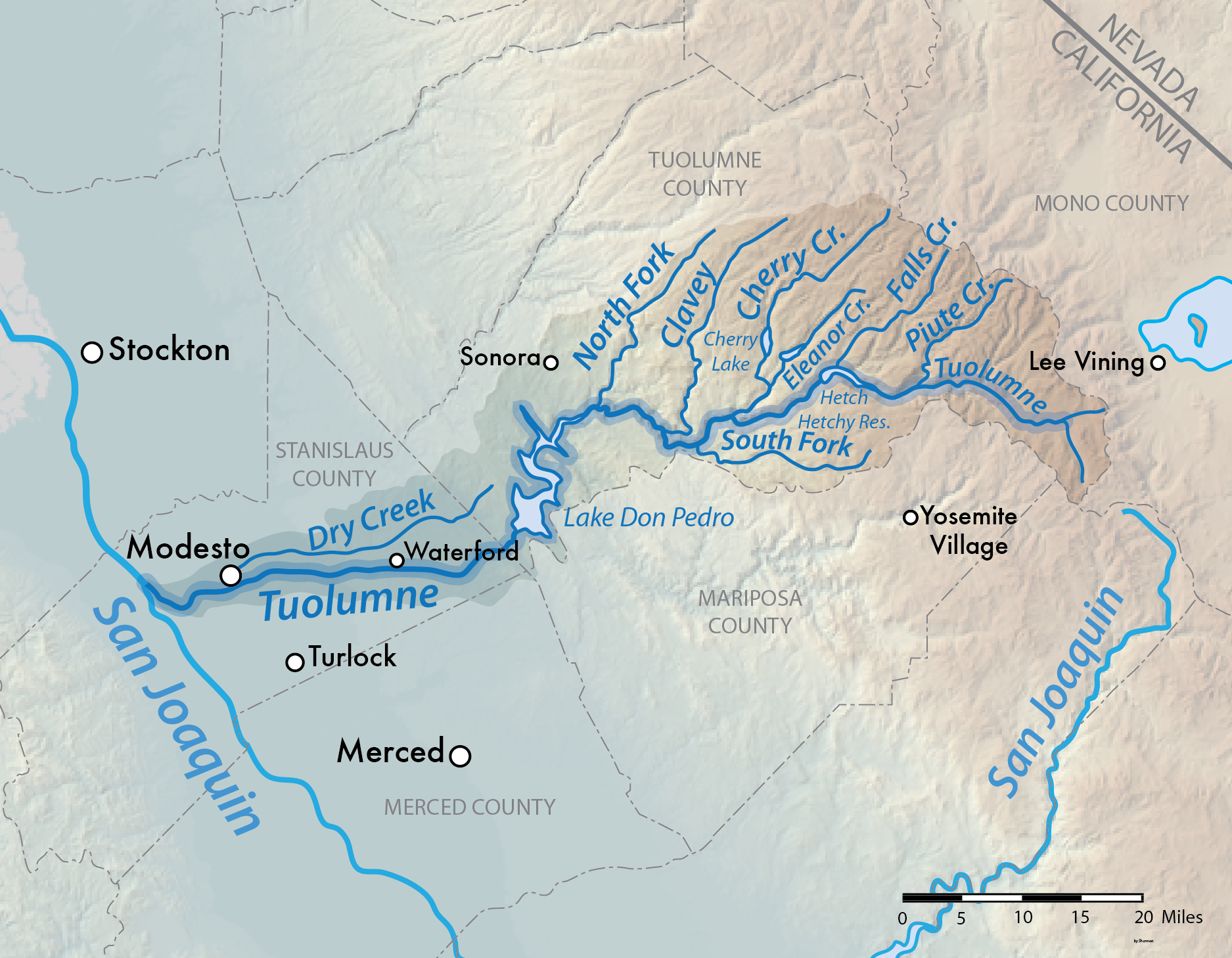
- The Tuolumne River watershed

Location
- Country: United States
- State: California

Physical characteristics
- Source: Confluence of Lyell and Dana Forks
  - location: Tuolumne Meadows, Yosemite National Park
  - coordinates: 37°52′31″N 119°21′08″W
  - elevation: 8,589 ft (2,618 m)
- Mouth: San Joaquin River
  - location: Grayson, Stanislaus County
  - coordinates: 37°36′21″N 121°10′25″W
  - elevation: 26 ft (7.9 m)
- Length: 148.7 mi (239.3 km)
- Basin size: 1,958 sq mi (5,070 km^{2})
- Discharge
  - location: above La Grange Dam
  - average: 2,343 cu ft/s (66.3 m^{3}/s)
  - minimum: 57 cu ft/s (1.6 m^{3}/s)
  - maximum: 130,000 cu ft/s (3,700 m^{3}/s)

Basin features
- Tributaries
  - left: South Fork Tuolumne River
  - right: Cherry Creek, Clavey River, North Fork Tuolumne River

National Wild and Scenic River
- Type: Wild, Scenic, Recreational
- Designated: September 28, 1984

The Tuolumne River (/tu.ˈɒ.ləm.i/, two-O-ləm-ee; Yokutsan: Tawalimnu) flows for 149 miles (240 km) through Central California, from the high Sierra Nevada to join the San Joaquin River in the Central Valley. Originating at over 8,000 feet (2,400 m) above sea level in Yosemite National Park, the Tuolumne drains a rugged watershed of 1,958 square miles (5,070 km^{2}), carving a series of canyons through the western slope of the Sierra. While the upper Tuolumne is a fast-flowing mountain stream, the lower river crosses a broad, fertile and extensively cultivated alluvial plain. Like most other central California rivers, the Tuolumne is dammed multiple times for irrigation and the generation of hydroelectricity.

Humans have inhabited the Tuolumne River area for up to 10,000 years. Prior to the arrival of Europeans, the river canyon provided an important summer hunting ground and a trade route between Native Americans in the Central Valley to the west and the Great Basin to the east. First named in 1806 by a Spanish explorer after a nearby indigenous village, the Tuolumne was heavily prospected during the California Gold Rush in the 1850s, and the lower valley was cultivated by American settlers over the next few decades. The city of Modesto grew up on the Tuolumne as a railroad hub, absorbing most of the population of the Tuolumne valley around the turn of the century. As agricultural production rose, farmers along the Tuolumne formed California's first two irrigation districts to better control and develop the river.

From the 1900s to the 1930s, the river was dammed at Don Pedro and Hetch Hetchy to provide water for Central Valley farmers and the city of San Francisco, respectively. The Hetch Hetchy project, located inside Yosemite National Park, incited national controversy, and has been described as having forged the modern environmental movement in the United States. As the mid-20th century progressed, demands on the Tuolumne continued to increase, culminating in the completion of New Don Pedro Dam in the early 1970s. These projects halved the amount of water flowing from the Tuolumne into the San Joaquin, greatly reducing the once-abundant runs of salmon and steelhead in both rivers.

== Course ==
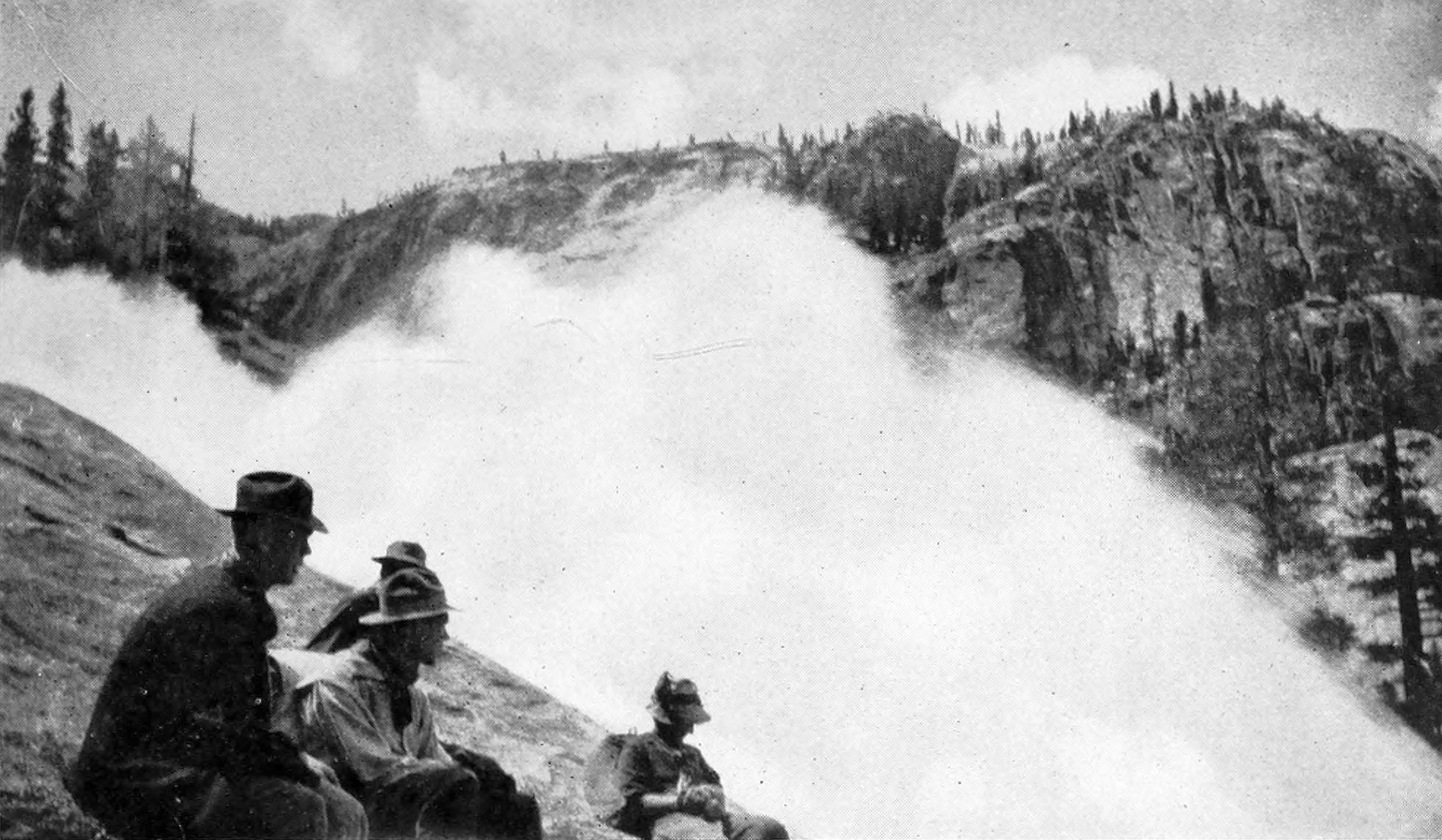

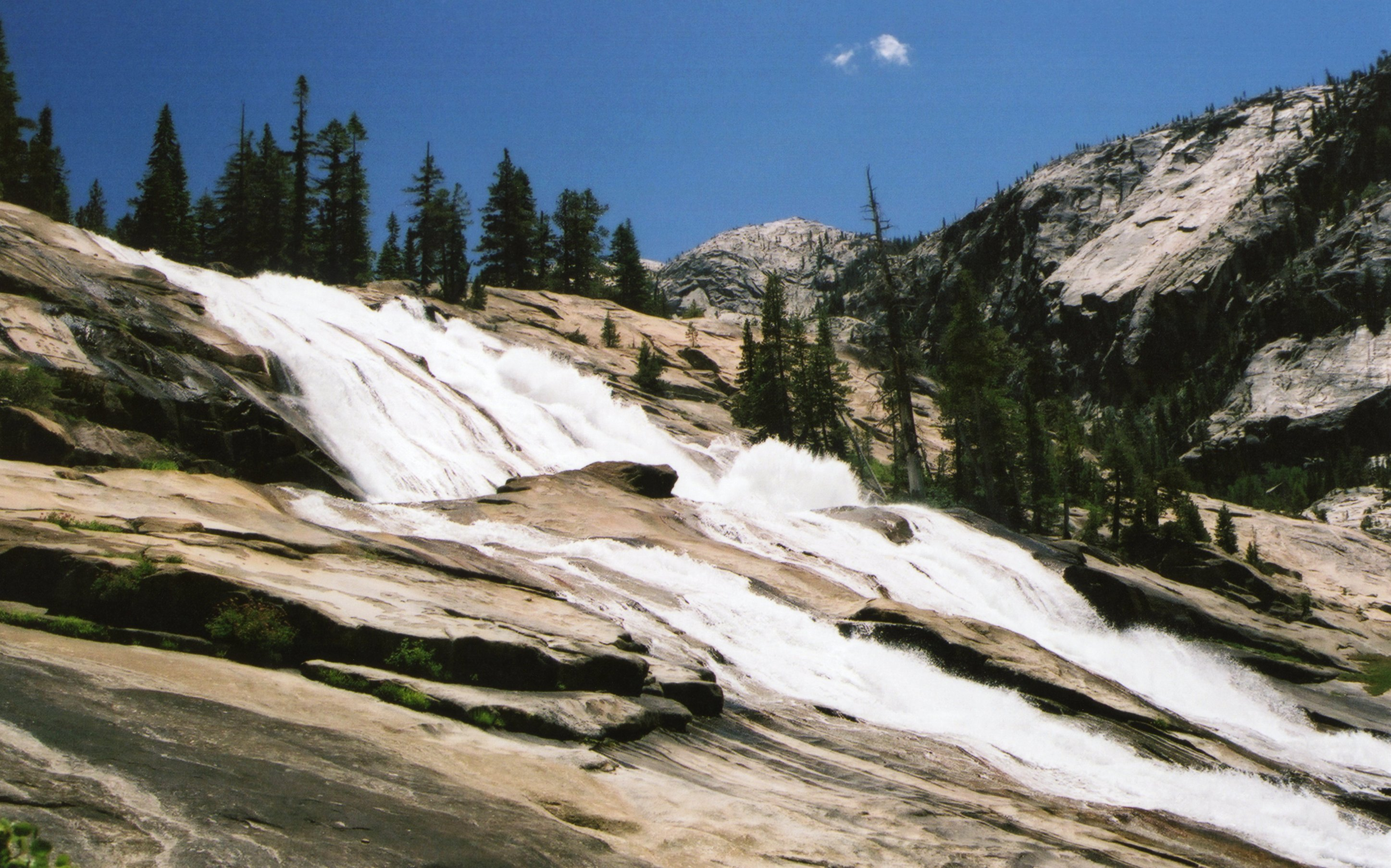
Top: California Falls. Bottom: Waterwheel Falls, the tallest of several waterfalls along the Tuolumne River.

The Tuolumne originates in Yosemite National Park, high in the Sierra Nevada, as two streams. The 7-mile (11 km) Lyell Fork rises at the Lyell Glacier below 13,114-foot (3,997 m) Mount Lyell, the highest peak in Yosemite National Park, and flows north through Lyell Canyon. The 5-mile (8.0 km) Dana Fork originates between Mount Dana (13,044-foot (3,976 m)) and Mount Gibbs (12,772-foot (3,893 m)) and flows west.

After the confluence of the forks in Tuolumne Meadows, the river meanders northwest, passing under Tioga Road. Although calm for the first few miles, this quickly changes as the river drops over Tuolumne Falls and White Cascades. After briefly passing through Glen Aulin, the river enters the spectacular 20-mile (32 km) Grand Canyon of the Tuolumne, where it forms three more major waterfalls – California, LeConte and Waterwheel Falls. Return and Piute Creeks join the river from the north within the Tuolumne Canyon. At the end of the canyon the river widens into Hetch Hetchy Reservoir, formed by a dam built in 1923 to provide water to the city of San Francisco, in the scenic Hetch Hetchy Valley. Falls Creek forms Wapama Falls and Tueeulala Falls, two of the highest in Yosemite, as it enters the reservoir from the north. From its source at 8,589 feet (2,618 m) above sea level in Tuolumne Meadows, the river drops nearly a mile (1.6 km) to the Hetch Hetchy reservoir at 3,800 feet (1,200 m).

Below the O'Shaughnessy Dam the Tuolumne passes Poopenaut Valley and enters a series of continuous canyons as it flows through the Sierra foothills, leaving the western boundary of Yosemite National Park and entering the Stanislaus National Forest. Most of the Tuolumne's main tributaries join within this reach, beginning with Cherry Creek from the north just below the intake of the Hetch Hetchy Aqueduct, which delivers water to San Francisco. The South Fork of the Tuolumne joins from the south a few miles downstream, near Groveland-Big Oak Flat, followed by the Clavey River from the north a few miles after that. The North Fork of the Tuolumne joins from the north near the upper end of Lake Don Pedro, which was formed in 1971 when the New Don Pedro Dam was built to provide hydroelectricity and irrigation water storage. Directly below Don Pedro Dam is the La Grange Dam, where about half the river's natural flow is diverted into the Turlock and Modesto Main Canals to irrigate over 200,000 acres (81,000 ha) in the Central Valley.

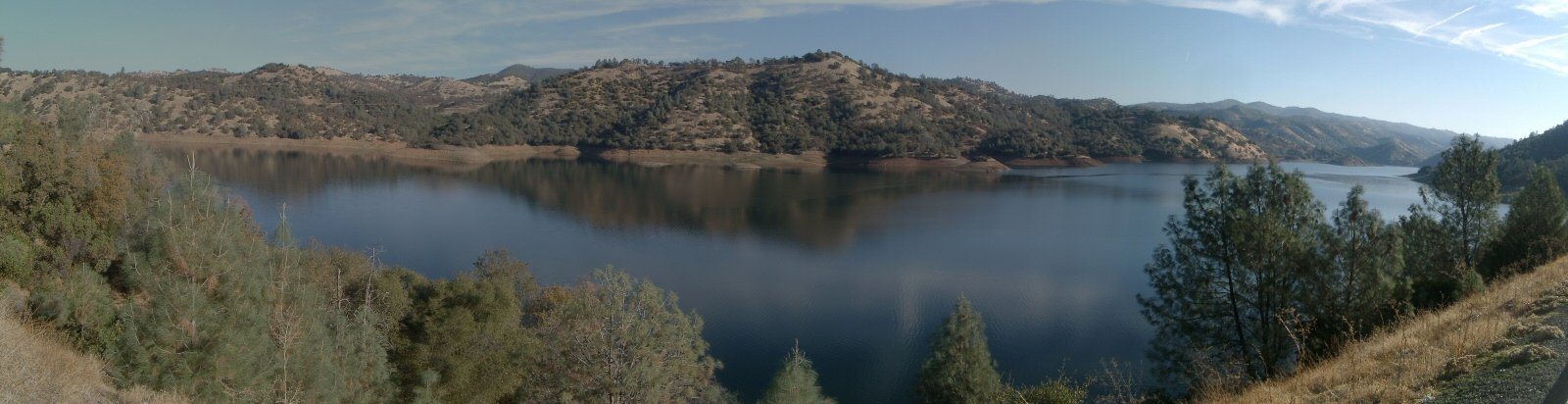
Lake Don Pedro, in the foothills east of La Grange, is the Tuolumne's largest reservoir.

Leaving the foothills, the Tuolumne flows approximately 50 miles (80 km) west across the Central Valley to its confluence with the San Joaquin River, passing Waterford, Hughson, Empire, Ceres and Modesto. The lower Tuolumne is wide and slow-flowing, dropping just 230 feet (70 m) from the base of La Grange Dam to its mouth at 26 feet (7.9 m). Highway 99 and the Southern Pacific Railroad tracks both cross the river in Modesto, and the Modesto Airport is located adjacent to the river shortly upstream. Dry Creek joins the Tuolumne from the north between the airport and the railroad. The confluence of the Tuolumne and San Joaquin is located in the San Joaquin River National Wildlife Refuge, about 2 miles (3.2 km) north of Grayson in Stanislaus County.

=== Discharge ===
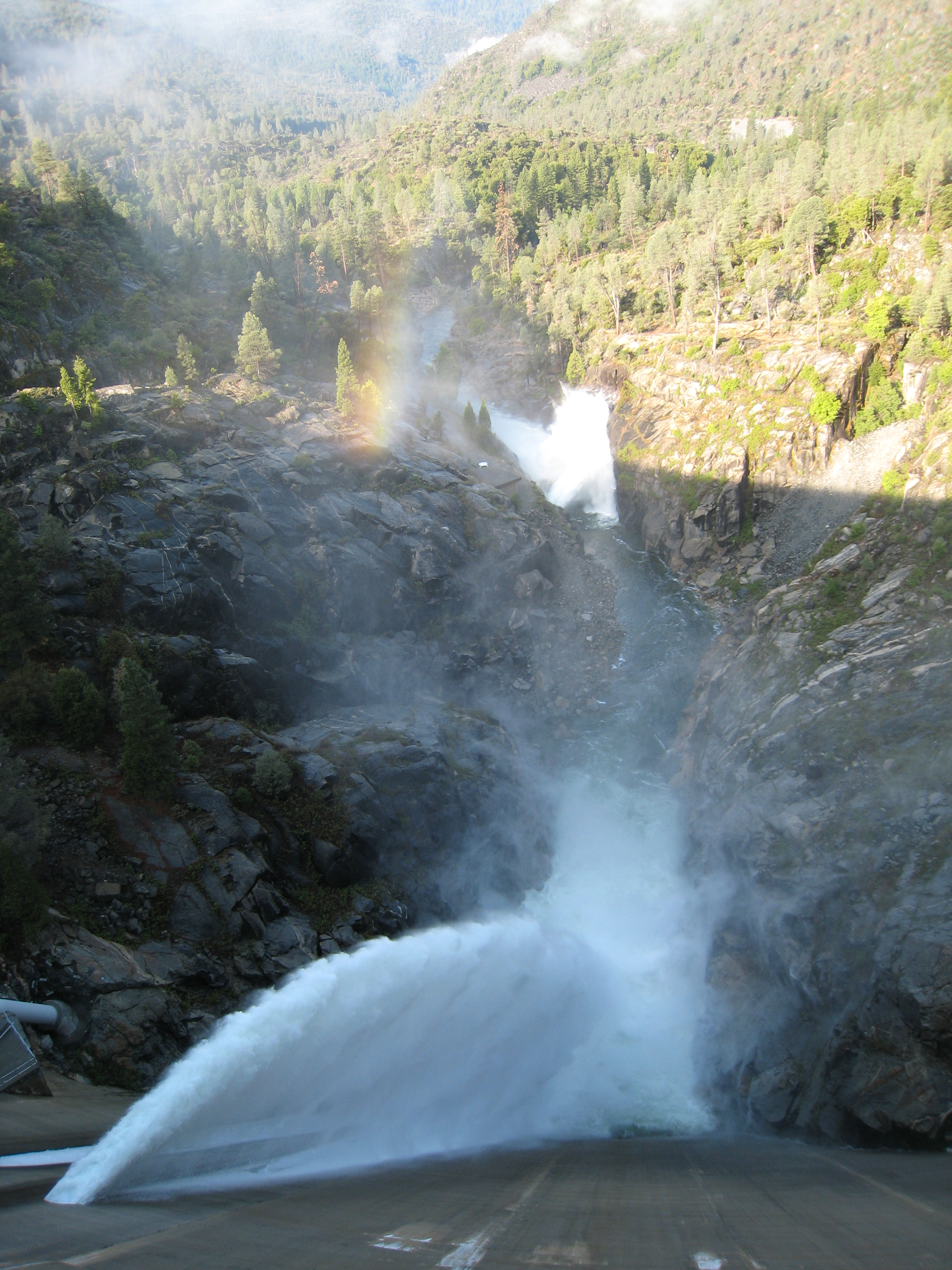
Flood water is released from Hetch Hetchy Reservoir into the Tuolumne River

By volume, the Tuolumne is the largest river draining the southern Sierra, with an estimated virgin flow of 1,850,000 acre-feet (2.28 km^{3}) per year – over 2,550 cubic feet per second (72 m^{3}/s). Near the river's mouth, the highest recorded annual volume was 3,995,000 acre-feet (4.928 km^{3}) or 5,518 cubic feet per second (156.3 m^{3}/s) in 1983, and the lowest was 134,000 acre-feet (0.165 km^{3}) or 185 cubic feet per second (5.2 m^{3}/s) in 1977 – a 30:1 difference. Although most of the flow in the river originates from summer snowmelt, massive floods can occur following heavy winter storms. The natural flow of the Tuolumne at the mouth is greatly reduced by diversions to both San Francisco's Hetch Hetchy municipal water system and the canals of the Modesto and Turlock irrigation districts.

The United States Geological Survey (USGS) operates, or has operated, several stream gauges along the Tuolumne River. Today, average annual river flows reach a maximum in the short stretch between Don Pedro Dam and La Grange Dam, about 50 miles (80 km) above the mouth, before the start of large irrigation diversions. A USGS gage recorded an average annual flow of 2,343 cubic feet per second (66.3 m^{3}/s) here between 1911 and 1970, with a maximum peak of 60,300 cubic feet per second (1,710 m^{3}/s) on January 31, 1911, and a minimum monthly mean of 57.5 cubic feet per second (1.63 m^{3}/s) in October 1912. During the Great Flood of 1862, the river reached an estimated peak of 130,000 cubic feet per second (3,700 m^{3}/s) here, after a record 72 inches (1,800 mm) of rain fell in the Tuolumne River basin between November 11, 1861, and January 14, 1862, as recorded at Sonora. The gage was not in place during this time.

Further downstream, the USGS gage at Modesto – about 10 miles (16 km) above the mouth – recorded an annual mean of 1,326 cubic feet per second (37.5 m^{3}/s) between 1940 and 2013. The highest peak was 57,000 cubic feet per second (1,600 m^{3}/s) on December 9, 1950, and the lowest daily mean was 56 cubic feet per second (1.6 m^{3}/s) on August 6, 1977.

== Watershed ==
=== Physiography ===
The Tuolumne River watershed can be divided into three distinct physiographic regions. From the headwaters to below Hetch Hetchy Reservoir, the river drains the Sierra highlands, which are characterized by solid, glacier-carved granitic bedrock, thin poor soils and areas of heavy forestation. Most of the snowpack that feeds the Tuolumne accumulates in this region. Streams are generally high-gradient, clear and rocky, but large alpine meadows provide riparian and wetland habitat, which contribute sediment to the watershed's runoff. There are also a large number of natural lakes and tarns in the upper watershed. The Sierra crest harbors a number of glaciers, including Lyell and Maclure Glaciers, the largest in Yosemite National Park. Melting ice feeds the upper reaches of the Tuolumne River, maintaining water flow in the late summer when many other streams in the region are dry. The Lyell Glacier is the second largest in the Sierra Nevada, after Palisade Glacier at the headwaters of Big Pine Creek a tributary of the Owens River. Both Lyell and Maclure glaciers have shrunk significantly since the late 1800s when measurements were first made.

Between Hetch Hetchy Reservoir and the upper end of Lake Don Pedro the Tuolumne flows through the Sierra foothills, where it has a lower gradient but continues to maintain a fast current. Stream pools and gravel bars figure more prominently in the channel, allowing the growth of riparian habitat. By the time the river reaches Lake Don Pedro it has accumulated almost 90 percent of its total flow as precipitation run-off, snowmelt and groundwater base flow. Below Don Pedro Dam the river flows across the large alluvial plain of the San Joaquin Valley, formed by millions of years of sediment deposits eroded from the Sierra. Historically this section of the river was subject to frequent course changes and formed thousands of acres of seasonal wetlands during the spring floods. Since the introduction of large-scale agriculture the Tuolumne River course has been fixed between an extensive system of levees. More than 300,000 acres (120,000 ha) in the San Joaquin Valley are irrigated using Tuolumne water.

About 669 square miles (1,730 km^{2}), or 34 percent, of the Tuolumne River watershed is inside Yosemite National Park. The rivers whose watersheds border that of the Tuolumne are the Stanislaus River and West Walker River in the north, the Merced River in the south, the East Walker River to the northeast, the Mono Lake basin (Mill Creek, Lee Vining Creek and Rush Creek) to the east, and the headwaters of the San Joaquin River proper to the southeast.

==== Tributaries ====
Major tributaries of the Tuolumne and pertinent data are listed in the below table. Order is from the headwaters downstream.

Name	Coordinates	Elevation	Distance from mouth	Length	Watershed	Discharge	Bank	Image
Dana Fork Tuolumne River	37°52′31″N 119°21′08″W	8,589 ft (2,618 m)	149 mi (240 km)	5 mi (8 km)			R	
Lyell Fork Tuolumne River	37°52′31″N 119°21′08″W	8,589 ft (2,618 m)	149 mi (240 km)	7 mi (11 km)			L	
Return Creek	37°55′55″N 119°27′58″W	6,204 ft (1,891 m)	139 mi (224 km)	14 mi (23 km)			R	
Piute Creek	37°55′48″N 119°36′03″W	4,344 ft (1,324 m)	130 mi (209 km)	20 mi (32 km)			R	
Rancheria Creek	37°57′12″N 119°43′41″W	3,796 ft (1,157 m)	121 mi (195 km)	24 mi (39 km)			R	
Falls Creek	37°57′47″N 119°45′55″W	3,783 ft (1,153 m)	119 mi (192 km)	23 mi (37 km)			R	
Cherry Creek	37°53′19″N 119°58′19″W	2,162 ft (659 m)	104 mi (167 km)	42 mi (68 km)	234 mi^{2} (607 km^{2})	694 cfs (19.7 m^{3}/s)	R	
South Fork Tuolumne River	37°50′25″N 120°02′52″W	1,447 ft (441 m)	96 mi (155 km)	31 mi (50 km)	164 mi^{2} (425 km^{2})	167 cfs (4.7 m^{3}/s)	L	
Clavey River	37°51′50″N 120°06′59″W	1,178 ft (359 m)	91 mi (147 km)	42 mi (68 km)	157 mi^{2} (407 km^{2})	255 cfs (7.2 m^{3}/s)	R	
North Fork Tuolumne River	37°53′49″N 120°15′14″W	853 ft (260 m)	81 mi (130 km)	36 mi (58 km)		54 cfs (1.5 m^{3}/s)	R	
Woods Creek	37°50′45″N 120°22′41″W	791 ft (241 m)	68 mi (109 km)	28 mi (45 km)			R	
Dry Creek	37°53′49″N 120°15′14″W	46 ft (14 m)	10 mi (16 km)	63 mi (101 km)			R	

=== Land use ===
Almost 80 percent of the Tuolumne River watershed lies above New Don Pedro Dam and is primarily forested with some alpine meadow and grassland zones. The primary land use in the lower Tuolumne River watershed is agriculture, but there are also significant urbanized areas. Although only about 68,000 acres (28,000 ha) (5.4 percent) of the watershed itself are farmed, river water is used to irrigate almost five times that area outside the watershed boundaries. About 16,500 acres (6,700 ha) (1.3 percent) of the watershed are urbanized, mostly in the Greater Modesto area. About 550,000 people inhabit the Tuolumne River watershed as a whole, with approximately 210,000 living in Modesto.

=== Engineering and flood control ===
Like most other Sierra Nevada rivers, the Tuolumne has been extensively dammed to provide flood control, water supply, and hydroelectric power. The uppermost dam is the O'Shaughnessy, which impounds the 360,000-acre-foot (440,000,000 m^{3}) Hetch Hetchy Reservoir, providing water and power to the City of San Francisco. The Hetch Hetchy hydroelectric system diverts large volumes of water into tunnels that feed two hydroelectric plants, the Kirkwood and the Moccasin. The power system is efficient because of the Tuolumne's great drop, over 2,750 feet (840 m), between Hetch Hetchy and the outlet of Moccasin Powerhouse. However, it also causes dewatering of significant portions of the Tuolumne River, especially during low water summers when all but a minimal fish release is diverted through the power plants. Not all of the flow used by the power plants is returned to the river. About 244,000 acre-feet (301,000,000 m^{3}) per year flows through the gravity fed Hetch Hetchy Aqueduct to serve San Francisco and its customer municipalities. Due to the pristine quality of the water, the Hetch Hetchy system is one of only a few serving major cities in the United States that does not require filtration.

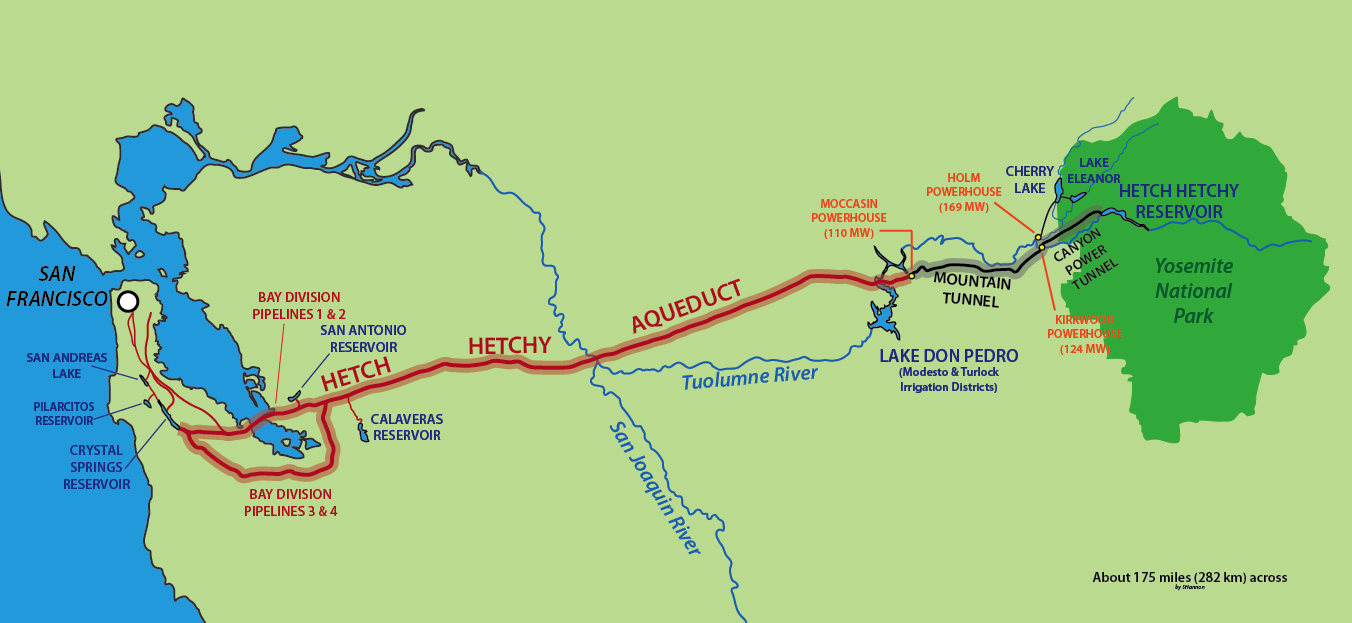
The Hetch Hetchy Project provides Tuolumne water to the city of San Francisco.

Cherry Creek, the Tuolumne's biggest tributary, is also part of the San Francisco hydroelectric system. Cherry Creek is dammed at the Cherry Valley Dam, which creates 274,000-acre-foot (338,000,000 m^{3}) Cherry Lake. A major tributary, Eleanor Creek, is dammed to form Lake Eleanor, and diverted into Cherry Lake through a tunnel. The combined flow is channeled into a penstock and returns to the river at the Holm Powerhouse. Unlike the Hetch Hetchy system, the Cherry Creek system is used exclusively for hydropower, not water supply, because the water quality is not quite as good. However, there is a connecting aqueduct that allows Cherry Lake to be tapped to supply the Hetch Hetchy system during severe droughts. This backup water supply was last used during late 2015, as a test to ensure its functionality should drought conditions become worse. The previous time it was used was 1988.

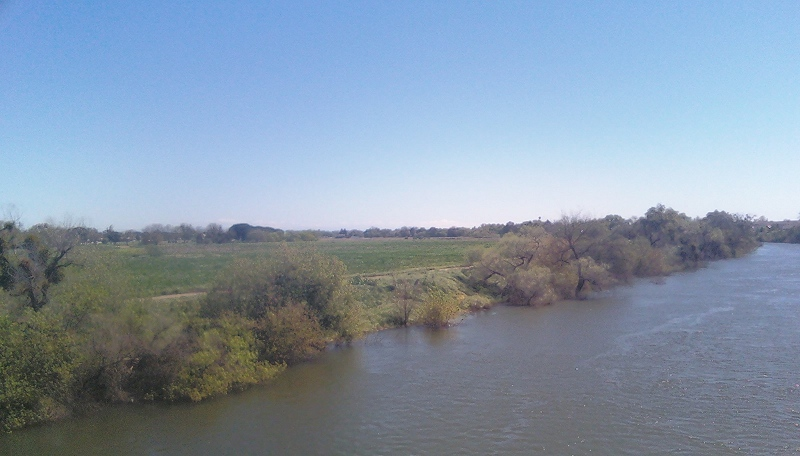
Tuolumne River in Modesto

Below the confluence with the North Fork of the Tuolumne the river flows into Lake Don Pedro, the largest in the Tuolumne River system and the sixth-largest man made lake in California at 2,030,000 acre-feet (2.50×10^{9} m^{3}). The earth-filled New Don Pedro Dam, 585 feet (178 m) high, is the 10th tallest dam in the United States and was constructed as a multipurpose project, serving irrigation, municipal water supply, hydropower and flood control. It replaced an earlier concrete dam built on approximately the same site. The Turlock and Modesto Irrigation Districts control the lion's share of water in the reservoir, although the City of San Francisco also has storage rights, which it uses mainly to offset the effects of water diverted upstream at Hetch Hetchy. Because of the desire to increase water storage for other uses, only 340,000 acre-feet (420,000,000 m^{3}) of the reservoir is designated flood control, which is relatively small compared to other reservoirs in California. As a result, Don Pedro frequently fills and spills during winter storms, causing damage downstream.

The La Grange Dam, a much smaller masonry diversion dam, is the last one on the Tuolumne before it joins with the San Joaquin. Modesto Canal, on the north side of the river, and Turlock Canal, on the south side, are both large irrigation diversions. The Modesto Canal feeds the 29,000-acre-foot (36,000,000 m^{3}) off-stream Modesto Reservoir, which regulates the water for distribution to farmers. The Turlock Lake is regulated by the similar but much larger Turlock Lake, which has a capacity of 49,000-acre-foot (60,000,000 m^{3}). The estimated annual diversion for irrigation is 867,000 acre-feet (1.069×10^{9} m^{3}), about half of the Tuolumne River's natural flow.

Below La Grange, the Tuolumne – much reduced due to irrigation diversions – flows through a fixed channel with a highly restricted floodplain. Before agriculture, the river inundated large areas of seasonal marshland and was free to change course during its frequent floods. Today farms and communities are protected by a levee system with a channel capacity of roughly 9,000 cubic feet per second (250 m^{3}/s) at the 9th St. Bridge in Modesto – significantly smaller than the river's maximum flood potential. The valley is dependent on flood control storage at Lake Don Pedro to prevent flows from exceeding the channel capacity. However, this has happened many times, most infamously during the New Year's Flood of 1997, during which inflows to Don Pedro hit 120,000 cubic feet per second (3,400 m^{3}/s), the largest recorded since the Great Flood of 1862. Water releases from Don Pedro Dam peaked at 60,000 cubic feet per second (1,700 m^{3}/s); while this vastly reduced potential damage from the flood, it still exceeded the channel capacity by six times, causing extensive property damage along the river.

=== Fish, plants and wildlife ===
The Tuolumne once supported large spring and fall runs of chinook salmon (king salmon, Oncorhynchus tshawytscha) and steelhead trout (Oncorhynchus mykiss). In its native state the fall Chinook run alone may have numbered as high as 130,000. With the exception of the Merced River immediately south, this is the southernmost existing population of Chinook salmon in North America. Massive irrigation diversions and river channelization projects have led to the extinction of the spring Chinook run and greatly reduced the fall run. Dams have blocked more than half of the original 99 miles (159 km) of migratory fish spawning habitat in the Tuolumne River watershed. The San Joaquin River and the Sacramento–San Joaquin River Delta, which link the Tuolumne salmon runs to the Pacific, have also been affected by flow reduction and pollution. In addition, introduced species such as striped bass prey on juvenile salmon, consuming as much as 93 percent of smolt before they can migrate to the sea. A controversial proposal by the State Water Resources Control Board from around 2013 would require increased spring and summer flows on the Tuolumne River which would benefit native anadromous fish populations, but greatly reduce the water supply available for farms and cities. This has been countered by irrigation districts who maintain that the aforementioned predation, not low flows, are the primary cause of salmon smolt deaths.

Forests in the watershed are divided between several distinct zones. The foothill region is characterized by trees and plants adapted to a hot, dry climate, including chamise (greasewood), California lilac, manzanita, blue oak, interior live oak (Sierra live oak), and gray pine. Further east and higher in elevation are the lower and upper montane forests, which lie between 3,000 to 6,000 feet (910 to 1,830 m) and 6,000 to 8,000 feet (1,800 to 2,400 m) elevation, respectively. The lower montane forests include black oak, ponderosa pine, incense cedar and white fir; higher up Jeffrey pine and western juniper appear. Higher still is the subalpine forest zone between 8,000 to 9,500 feet (2,400 to 2,900 m), which is dominated by Western white pine, mountain hemlock and lodgepole pine. Above 9500 feet, only small shrubs, flowering plants and occasional whitebark pine populate the alpine zone, which is limited to the peaks around Tuolumne Meadows and along the Sierra Crest.

Humans have influenced natural conditions in the Tuolumne River watershed for centuries. Native Americans set controlled fires in grassland to clear out dead foliage, providing room for new growth which in turn attracted game animals to forage. They also periodically burned out oak woodland areas in the foothills to control pests, which otherwise would have affected their main food supply, acorns. During the Spanish and Mexican periods, the Central Valley was used for cattle ranching, which quickly decimated natural range grasses. During the 1880s American sheep ranchers brought their herds into the upper Tuolumne River watershed for summer pasture, which further damaged the range in the foothills and Sierras. Hetch Hetchy Valley was one of the main summer grazing areas for sheep. The decline of native perennial grasses caused invasive annual species to flourish, and also increased the susceptibility of the watershed to wildfires. In order to protect property and watershed quality, intensive fire suppression began in the early 20th century. However, this led to overgrowth and a disruption of the natural forest succession process that was previously driven by wildfires.

== Early history ==
Estimates of the first human habitation along the Tuolumne River range from 3000 to 7000 BC. The Plains and Sierra Miwok, who were the largest regional Native American group immediately prior to European contact, first established themselves in the area around 1200 CE. The Miwok lived in the Sierra foothills and Central Valley lowlands during winter and traveled into the upper Tuolumne River in summer to hunt, as well as seek refuge from the summer heat. The Paiute, who inhabited the Great Basin on the east side of the Sierra, also ventured into the Tuolumne River basin during the summer. The Yokuts lived along the lower Tuolumne River and were not known to venture up into the Sierra during summer.

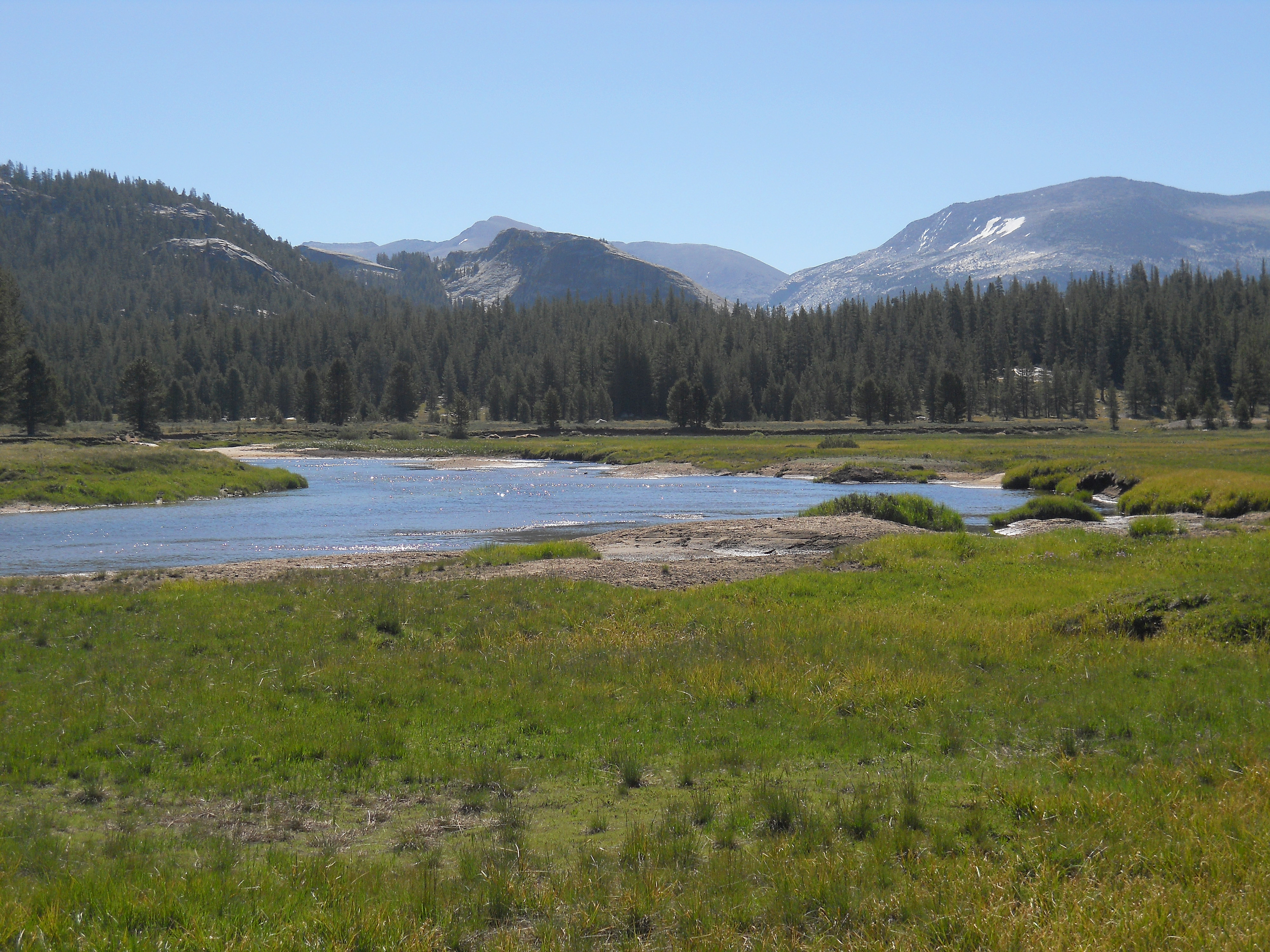
Tuolumne River in West Meadow, Tuolumne Meadows

The chief meeting point of the Paiute and Miwok was the Hetch Hetchy Valley, rich in edible plants and game. The origin of the name "Hetch Hetchy" may have been a type of edible grass that grew in the valley, which native peoples made into grain and ground in stone mortars for meal. They set controlled fires to clear out old vegetation in their gathering areas, allowing for more efficient harvesting of new growth. This would also increase the prevalence of grasses and ferns, attracting game animals such as deer, and made the landscape more easily navigable. Many of the landscapes in the Tuolumne River area encountered by the first European explorers were thus not pristine but the result of hundreds of years of management; indeed, the famous meadows of Hetch Hetchy Valley prior to its damming only existed because of the annual burn.

The origin of the Tuolumne River's name is unclear. The first recorded use of the name "Tuolumne" was by the Spanish explorer Gabriel Moraga in 1806, who may have named the river for the nearby Native American village of Tualamne or Tautamne. This may in turn refer to the native word talmalamne, or "a group of stone huts or caves". Father Pedro Muñoz, a member of the 1806 expedition, noted in his diary that "we came upon a village called Tautamne. This village is situated on some steep precipices, inaccessible on account of their rough rocks. The Indians live in their sótanos [cellars or caves]". At this time, the Native American population along the lower Tuolumne and Stanislaus Rivers is believed to have been approximately two thousand.

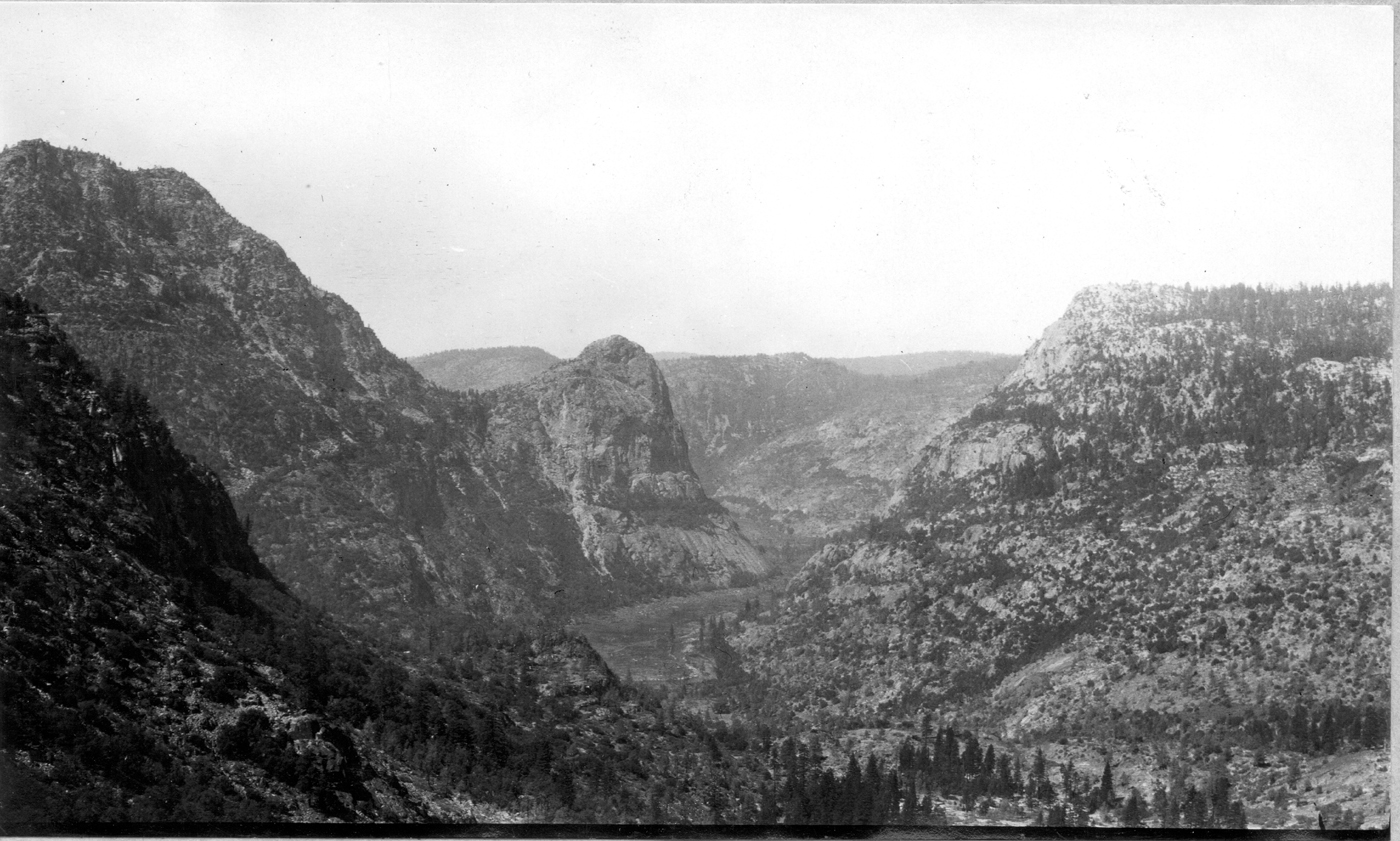
Grand Canyon of the Tuolumne, circa 1914

Another possible origin of the name Tuolumne is the Central Sierra Miwok word taawalïmi, meaning "squirrel place", referring to a Native American village on the nearby Stanislaus River. The suffix -umne, which appears in the names of two other California rivers, the Mokelumne and Cosumnes, is thought to have meant "place of" or "people of" in the native language.

The Tuolumne River was the scene of significant gold mining activity during the California Gold Rush. The first known discovery of gold in the area was made by Benjamin Wood, a prospector from Oregon, in the summer of 1848. During the latter part of that year and early 1849, mining camps were established along the Tuolumne, including Jamestown, Tuttletown, Melones, Don Pedros Bar, and Shaws Flat. The following spring a party of Mexican miners from Sonora discovered an even richer deposit farther upstream, establishing Sonoranian Camp, predecessor of the present-day town of Sonora, California. By the end of 1849, there were over 10,000 miners in the Tuolumne River area, half of them in Sonora, which became the Tuolumne County seat in 1850.

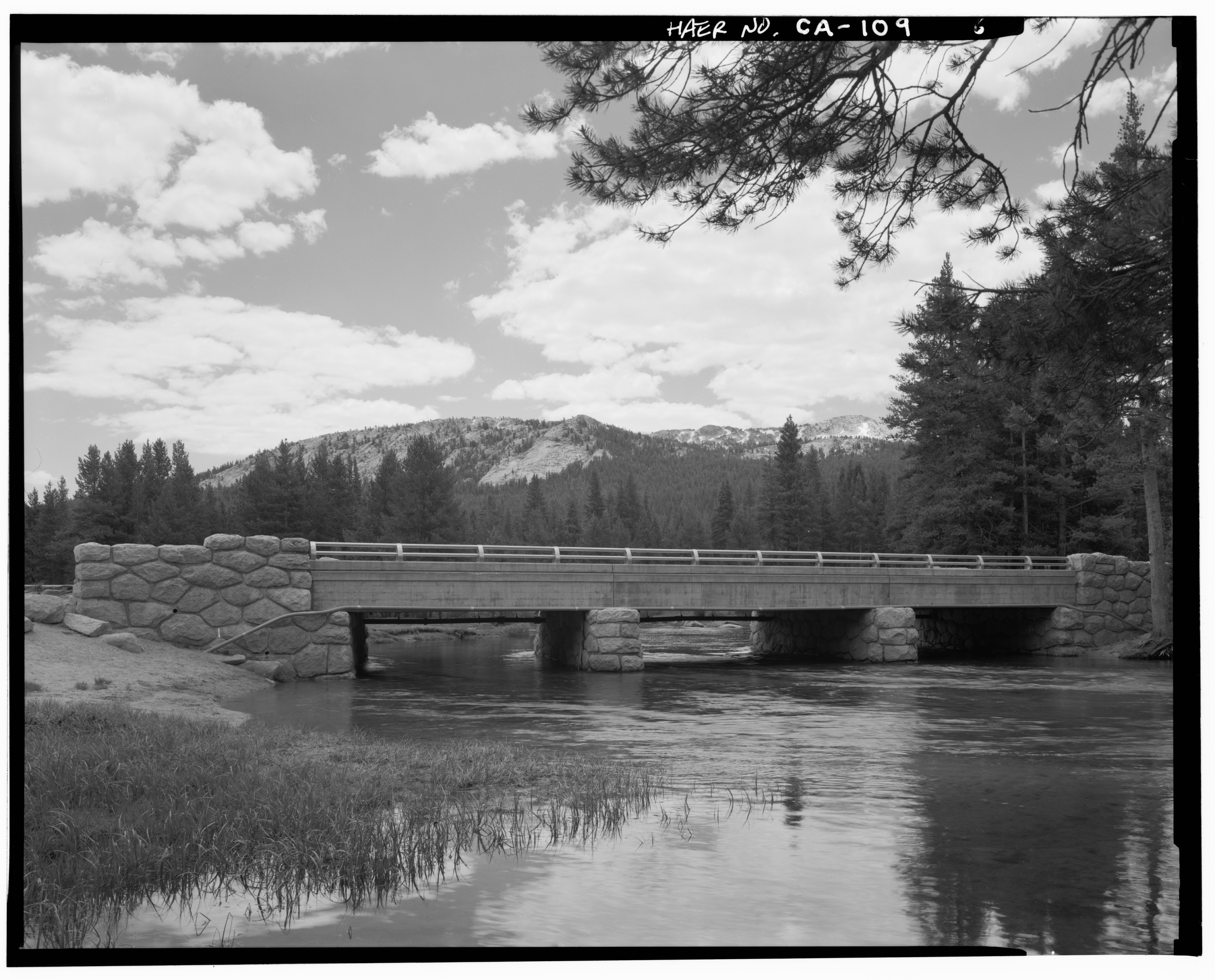
Tioga Road, originally a Gold Rush-era pack trail, crosses the Tuolumne at Tuolumne Meadows.

Mining activity increased dramatically in the early 1850s, with prospectors pushing up into the foothills beyond Soulsbyville. In March 1850, an "enormously rich" deposit was discovered at Columbia. The same year, the Bonanza Mine near Sonora yielded a 1500-ounce nugget, the fourth largest ever discovered in California. (The largest was found in Carson Hill in Calaveras County, just north of the Tuolumne River watershed along the Stanislaus River, in 1854.) The prosperity in the region prompted a search for a new crossing of the Sierra Nevada that would provide more direct access to the camps from the east. The Clark-Skidmore Party made this crossing in 1852 via the upper Stanislaus River and the north fork of the Tuolumne. Parts of the route they established eventually formed the Walker River Trail, regarded as one of the more difficult of the main Sierra crossings.

For a brief period the lower Tuolumne became a major steamboat route, ferrying prospectors and supplies from Stockton. Depending on water level, approximately 35 miles (56 km) of the lower river were navigable, from the mouth to above Waterford. The unpredictable nature of the river made both navigating and crossing difficult, so starting in the Gold Rush era many ferries were established, one of the first at Dickenson's Ferry in the early 1850s. This particular location was the crossing of Fort Miller Road (Millerton Road), a major land trade route that connected Stockton with Millerton near present-day Fresno (today the site of the Millerton Lake reservoir).

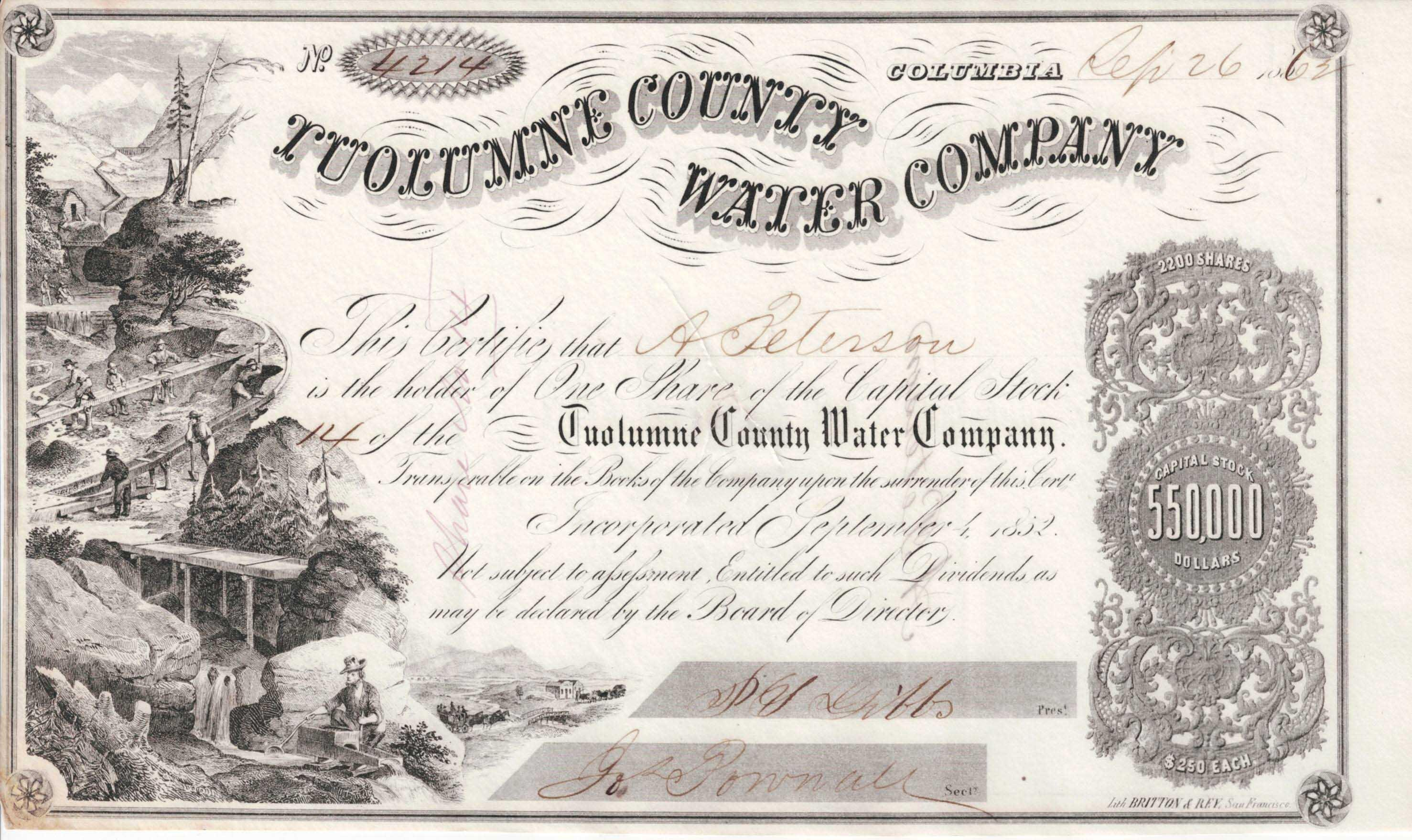
Share of the Toulumne County Water Company, issued 1863

By 1853, most of the easily mined gold had been exhausted, and hydraulic mining operations became the dominant extraction method. The Tuolumne County Water Company, first organized in 1851 to divert water from the Tuolumne River basin to the Stanislaus River, constructed a network of reservoirs, ditches and flumes initially used for mining and later for irrigation. The Golden Rock Water Company, incorporated in 1855, diverted the South Fork of the Tuolumne to supply the diggings at Groveland and Big Oak Flat; their most notable achievement was the construction of a 2,200-foot (670 m) long, 265-foot (81 m) high aqueduct (the Big Gap Flume) over Buck Meadows. The first dam on the Tuolumne River proper, near La Grange, was built in 1852 to divert water for hydraulic mining. Sediment and rocks washed down by hydraulic mining and sluicing operations accumulated along the lower Tuolumne, destroying native floodplain habitat and making much of the river unnavigable.

== Irrigation, power and water supply ==
=== La Grange and Old Don Pedro Dams ===
After the gold rush many miners settled along the lower Tuolumne River as farmers. Ferry sites grew into lively towns, such as at Waterford, where a crossing had been established in 1866. The town of Tuolumne City was founded near the mouth of the Tuolumne as a port, but it soon became apparent that mining debris had made the river unsuitable for navigation, and the area was abandoned. In the mid-1860s Tuolumne City and Paradise (located about 5 miles (8.0 km) further up the river) were reestablished as farming communities. The founding of Modesto in 1870, along a new railroad through the San Joaquin Valley, drew most of the population away from these towns and others along the Tuolumne. By the early 1900s Modesto's population numbered more than four thousand.

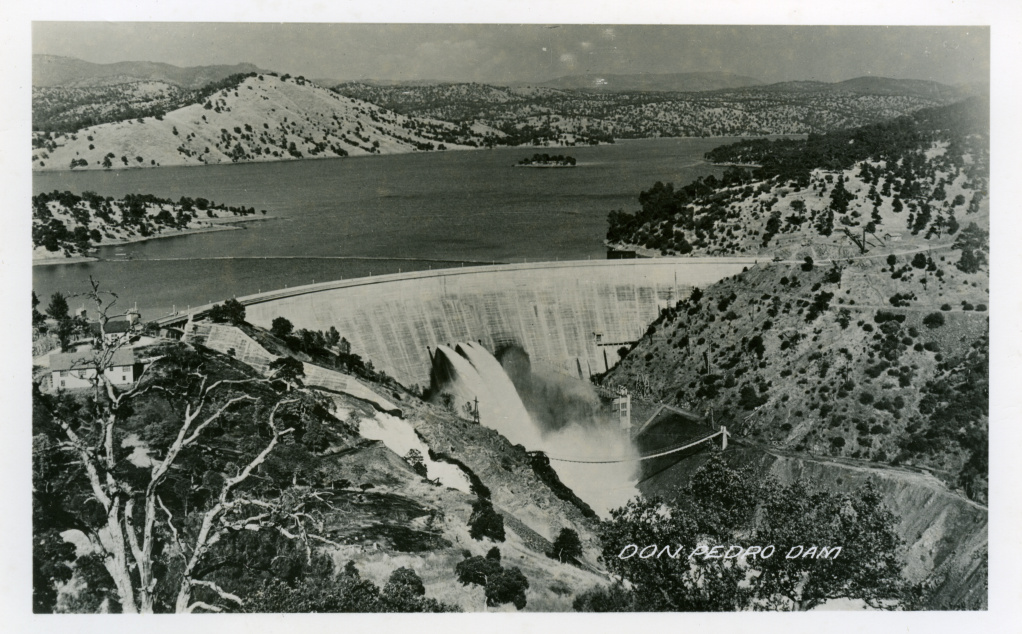
The original Don Pedro Dam was completed in 1923 to provide long-term storage for irrigation.

As it became apparent that the Central Valley's seasonal rainfall patterns made it unsuitable for dryland farming, farmers organized to build irrigation infrastructure along the Tuolumne River. Turlock Irrigation District (TID), established in 1887, was the first irrigation district in California, and the Modesto Irrigation District (MID) was established soon after in the same year. The two districts serve the south and north sides of the river, respectively. The present-day La Grange Dam, completed in 1893, replaced the older mining dam at the same site; at 122 feet (37 m), it was the highest overflow dam in the United States. The dam diverted the river into canals that water most of the lower valley. The first TID farmers received water in 1900. The MID canal took a total of thirteen years to complete, with the first water deliveries on June 27, 1903.

As the population of the area grew, the Tuolumne River districts soon began to experience seasonal water shortages. The Dallas-Warner Reservoir (today's Modesto Reservoir) was completed in 1912 on the north side of the river, but was only considered a temporary solution. Construction on the first Don Pedro Dam began in 1921 to store floodwaters of the Tuolumne proper, allowing for the extension of the irrigation season and to provide water during dry years. A secondary purpose for the construction of the dam was that TID and MID were aware that the city of San Francisco, 160 miles (260 km) west of the river, coveted water from the Tuolumne. Although the irrigation districts had the primary rights to the Tuolumne under the doctrine of prior appropriation, those rights could be relinquished under the "use it or lose it" rule, so storage had to be developed to enable the full beneficial use of river water. Named for the Gold Rush mining camp its reservoir submerged, the Don Pedro dam was completed in 1923, holding back 289,000 acre-feet (0.356 km^{3}) of water. In 1923 and 1924 both Don Pedro and La Grange dams were fitted for hydroelectric generation. There was also a company called Tuolumne River Water company. They are famous for changing miners and residents a very high price due to there only being one water company in the area which meant that they had zero competition. Miners and residents wanted a solution so eventually facilitated the creation of the rival company called the Stainislaus Columbia river water company which charged significantly less for water. This would not last long as eventually with lower prices and the gold in california drying up the company would ultimatly fail due to a lack of profit.

=== Hetch Hetchy Project ===
San Francisco did not move forward with plans to divert the Tuolumne until the 1906 San Francisco earthquake and subsequent fires devastated the city, proving the inadequacy of the existing water system. After exploring fourteen sites throughout Central California, San Francisco had settled on the Tuolumne's Hetch Hetchy Valley as the ideal location to develop storage and hydroelectric power. Because the area had been located inside Yosemite National Park since 1890, the city petitioned for Congress to pass the Raker Act. Signed in 1913 by President Woodrow Wilson, the Act allowed San Francisco to dam the Tuolumne River, as long as the water and power provided would be reserved exclusively for public utility, not private sale.

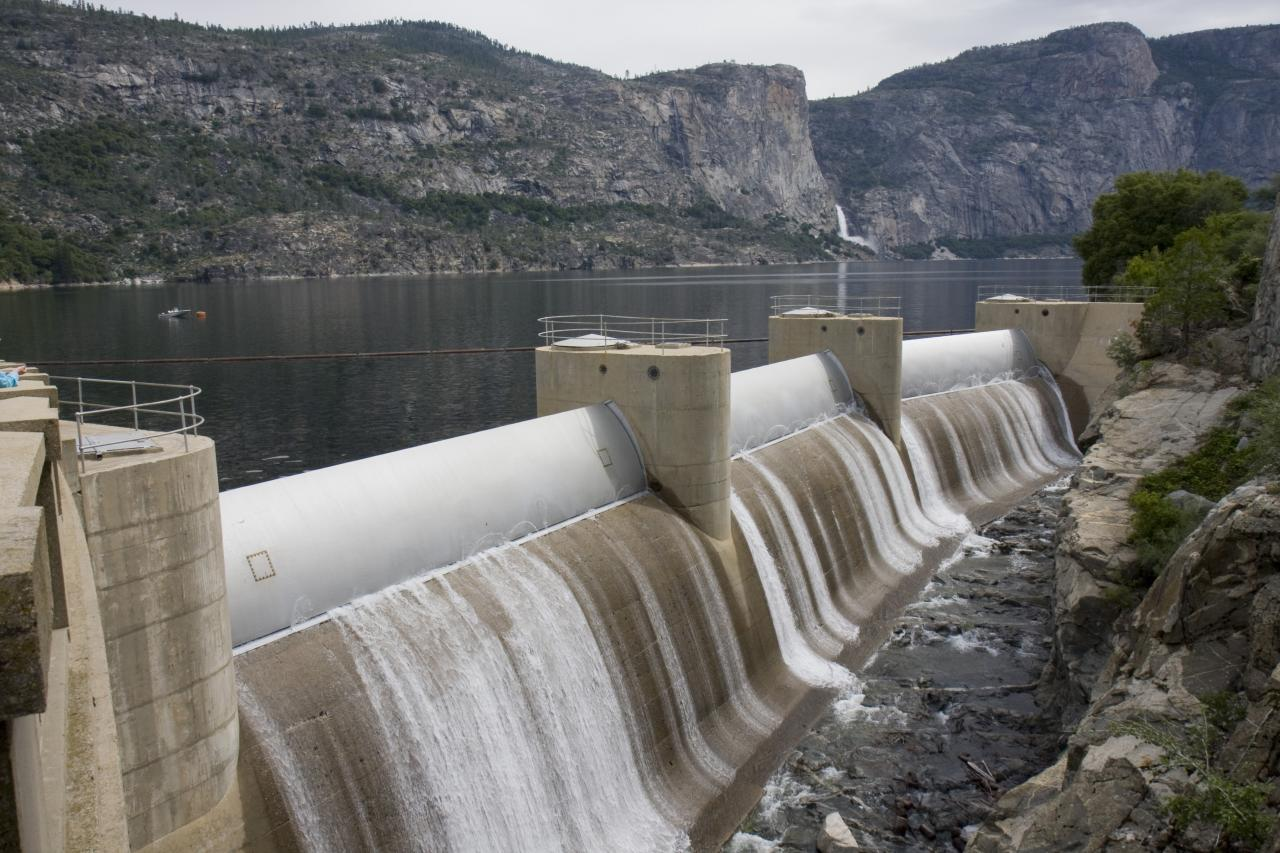
Hetch Hetchy Reservoir and spillway

The Hetch Hetchy Valley became the center of the first major environmental controversy in the United States. John Muir, the leader of the Sierra Club, spearheaded a legal battle against the proposed O'Shaughnessy Dam, famously stating – "Dam Hetch Hetchy! As well dam for water-tanks the peoples' cathedrals and churches, for no holier temple has ever been consecrated by the heart of man." The Hetchy hetchy was also seen as a way for people who lived in cities to experience nature. john Muir belived that damming it would mean that there was less nature for city people to enjoy. He also points out that the government had perserved Pinnacles national park and made it a national park but they would not do the same for the Hetch Hetchy.The Hetch Hetchy debacle is often credited with birthing modern environmentalism, sharply dividing the conservation movement – which favored the development of natural resources for public benefit – and the preservationists, who believed that sites of scenic value like Hetch Hetchy were better left for public recreation and enjoyment.

Despite the controversy, the city of San Francisco pushed through, beginning construction in early 1914 and filling the reservoir for the first time in May 1923. The Hetch Hetchy Railroad was built along 68 miles (109 km) of the Tuolumne River Canyon to provide access to the remote construction site. Hydroelectric power reached San Francisco by 1925, but the first water was not delivered until 1934. Today, San Francisco diverts about 33 percent of the flow of the Tuolumne at Hetch Hetchy, or 14 percent of the river's total flow.

=== New Don Pedro Dam and modern development ===
By the mid 20th century it was clear that storage capacity in Tuolumne River reservoirs was insufficient to meet growing water demands. The irrigation dam at Don Pedro could only store enough water for a single growing season, allowing little carryover for drought years, and on the other hand providing very little flood control. In the late 1950s TID and MID began planning for a high dam on the Tuolumne River several miles below the existing Don Pedro Dam. In 1961 voters approved revenue bonds to fund the project. However, it took until 1966 for the Federal Power Commission (now FERC) to greenlight the project. Concerns that the new dam would impact king salmon populations were the primary cause of the delay.

Construction of the dam began in 1967 and the river was diverted in September 1968. The embankment was topped out on May 28, 1970, and the project was formally dedicated on May 22, 1971, after four years of construction and a total cost of over $110 million. It would be eleven years before the new reservoir of 2,030,000 acre-feet (2.50 km^{3}) – ten times the size of Old Don Pedro – filled completely in June 1982. The reservoir submerged 25 miles (40 km) of the middle Tuolumne River and 12,000 acres (4,900 ha) of surrounding land, including the historic Gold Rush town of Jacksonville.

=== Dam proposals ===
Since the 1970s, the Turlock Irrigation District has proposed damming the Clavey River, a free-flowing tributary of the Tuolumne, to produce hydroelectricity. The dam would have been 413 feet (126 m) high and dried up most of the lower Clavey, a popular whitewater run. In 1994 the Federal Energy Regulatory Commission studied the project and determined that the benefits would not justify the financial and environmental costs.

== Recreation ==
The Tuolumne River watershed receives over a million recreational visits each year, primarily to the protected wilderness areas of Yosemite National Park and to the difficult but popular whitewater on the Main Tuolumne and Cherry Creek.

The Tuolumne is considered a classic California whitewater run, and has been used recreationally since the 1960s. Most rafters put in at Meral's Pool, located about 2 miles (3.2 km) below Cherry Creek, for the 18-mile (29 km) run to Lake Don Pedro. Several rafting companies serve the main Tuolumne, a Class IV+ (advanced) river with many rapids changing to Class V when the flow exceeds 4,000 cubic feet per second (110 m^{3}/s). The most difficult single rapids is Clavey Falls, located just above the Clavey River; the longest is Grey's Grindstone, at nearly a mile (1.6 km). Between these two rapids the swimming holes of the Clavey are a popular camping spot during the summer. The Cherry Creek is also run by commercial trips. It is considered one of the most difficult whitewater rivers in the entire United States, with fifteen Class V rapids. Both runs are dam controlled, which usually extends the rafting season through the dry late summer and fall.

In Yosemite National Park, the Grand Canyon of the Tuolumne (from Tuolumne Meadows to Hetch Hetchy Reservoir) was first kayaked in 1983. This 32-mile (51 km) segment is rated Class IV-V+, with many waterfalls requiring a portage. In addition to being extremely difficult (if not borderline impossible at the aforementioned waterfalls) the water flow depends entirely on rain and snow melt, and the whitewater season can be extremely short during dry years. The general consensus is "that the best paddling in is the upper miles while the middle section is better for hikers and canyoneers."

The Clavey River, not being located in the national park, is open to public access, but due to its remoteness and difficulty (Class V+), and the short window of boatable spring runoff, it is only run by a handful of kayakers each year.

To protect the river, the U.S. Forest Service requires private trips to obtain a permit before floating the Tuolumne. Running the Tuolumne within Yosemite National Park was also in a legal gray zone until 2015, when the park opened the Tuolumne and Merced Rivers to limited paddling and rafting.

== Wildfire ==
In 2013, the Rim Fire burned 257,314 acres. This megafire was, at the time, California's third largest wildfire on record. This wildfire devastated habitat for many native and/or endangered species, and has impacted recreational opportunities, communities and economies alike.

== Wild and Scenic designation ==
The Tuolumne River received the Wild and Scenic Rivers designation in 1984. The designated reach is "the main stem from its source to the Don Pedro Reservoir." The system uses three classifications; Tuolumne has 47 miles (76 km) categorized as Wild, 23 miles (37 km) categorized as Scenic and 13 miles (21 km) categorized as Recreational, for a total of 83 miles (134 km) protected from further development.

== See also ==
- List of rivers of California
- Roderick Nash
- Tuolumne River Regional Park

== Works cited ==
- Epke, G; Finger, M; Lusardi, R; Marks, N; Nichols, A; Null, S; O’Rear, T; Senter, A; Viers, J (2010). Mount, J; Purdy, S (eds.). Confluence: A Natural and Human History of the Tuolumne River Watershed (PDF). Department of Geology and Center for Watershed Sciences. UC Davis. Archived from the original (PDF) on March 5, 2016.
