= Dry Creek (Tuolumne River tributary) =

Stream in Stanislaus County, California

Coordinates: 37.6277°N 120.9838°W

Dry Creek is a stream in Stanislaus County, California, that is a tributary to the Tuolumne River.

== Course ==
Dry Creek originates just north of the Modesto Reservoir. It then flows just north of the city of Waterford, California. Continuing west, it flows through Modesto, California. This is the most flood prone area of its route, primarily in the La Loma area. Dry Creek then terminates at its confluence with the Tuolumne River adjacent to the E & J Gallo Winery in downtown Modesto.

The Tuolumne River is a tributary of the San Joaquin River.

== History ==
Dry Creek has been historically subject to flooding the San Joaquin Valley in the vicinity of present-day Modesto. Most of the riparian zone vegetation was removed beginning around 1850, when significant numbers of immigrants were arriving in the area during the California Gold Rush.

The flooding that occurs is usually from periods of very high flow in the Tuolumne causing Dry Creek to back up.

== See also ==
- Tributaries of the San Joaquin River
