= Burro Pass =

Coordinates: 38°05′25″N 119°23′37″W

Burro Pass, elevation 11,100 feet (3,400 m), is a mountain pass in Yosemite National Park, United States.

A United States Geological Survey topographer named the gap after his burro.
