= La Grange Dam =

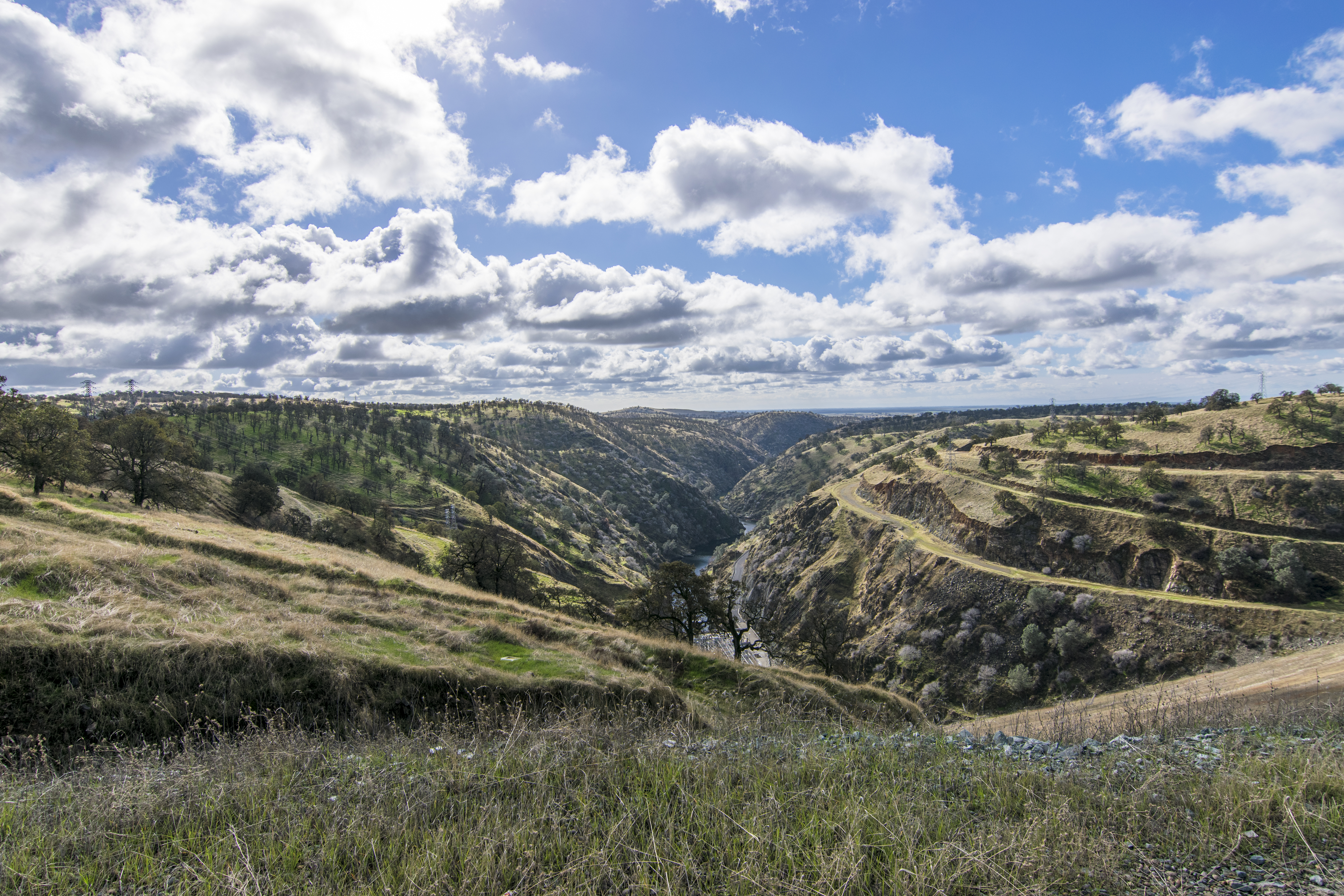
- La Grange Reservoir from the top of the New Don Pedro Dam

- Location of La Grange Dam
- Official name: La Grange Dam
- Location: La Grange, California
- Coordinates: 37°40′19″N 120°26′39″W
- Opening date: 1893; 133 years ago
- Owners: Turlock Irrigation District and Modesto Irrigation District

Dam and spillways
- Type of dam: Masonry-gravity
- Impounds: Tuolumne River
- Height: 131 feet (40 m)
- Length: 280 feet (85 m)
- Spillway type: Inlet-drop

Reservoir
- Creates: La Grange Reservoir
- Total capacity: 500 acre⋅ft (620,000 m^{3})
- Catchment area: 1,546 sq mi (4,000 km^{2})
- Surface area: 58 acres (23 ha)

Power Station
- Turbines: 2
- Installed capacity: 4 MW
- Annual generation: 18,000 kW h

The La Grange Dam is a masonry-gravity diversion dam on the Tuolumne River near La Grange, California. The dam was completed in 1893 by the Turlock Irrigation District and Modesto Irrigation District in an effort to divert water into their canal systems for local farmers.

The La Grange Dam is two miles (3 km) downstream of the New Don Pedro Dam and not only serves to regulate its outflows but diverts water from the Don Pedro's much larger reservoir into two canals on either side of the river. Each year, an average of 885,000 acre-feet (1.092×10^{9} m^{3}) of water is diverted. About 575,000 acre-feet (709,000,000 m^{3}) goes through TID's canal to Turlock Lake and another 310,000 acre-feet (380,000,000 m^{3}) goes through MID's canal to Modesto Reservoir. Nearly all of this water irrigates crops in the Turlock and Modesto Irrigation Districts. Another 230,000 acre-feet (280,000,000 m^{3}) goes to San Francisco's Hetch Hetchy Water and Power. And, finally, about 780,000 acre-feet (960,000,000 m^{3}) of water is delivered to the Tuolumne River channel to maintain flows in the 52 miles (84 km) of the Lower Tuolumne River through its confluence with the San Joaquin River and then into the Sacramento-San Joaquin Delta.

The La Grange Dam also diverts water to a small 4 MW hydroelectric power station above the east bank of the Tuolumne River that is operated by the Turlock Irrigation District.

== See also ==
- List of dams and reservoirs in California
