= North Fork Tuolumne River =

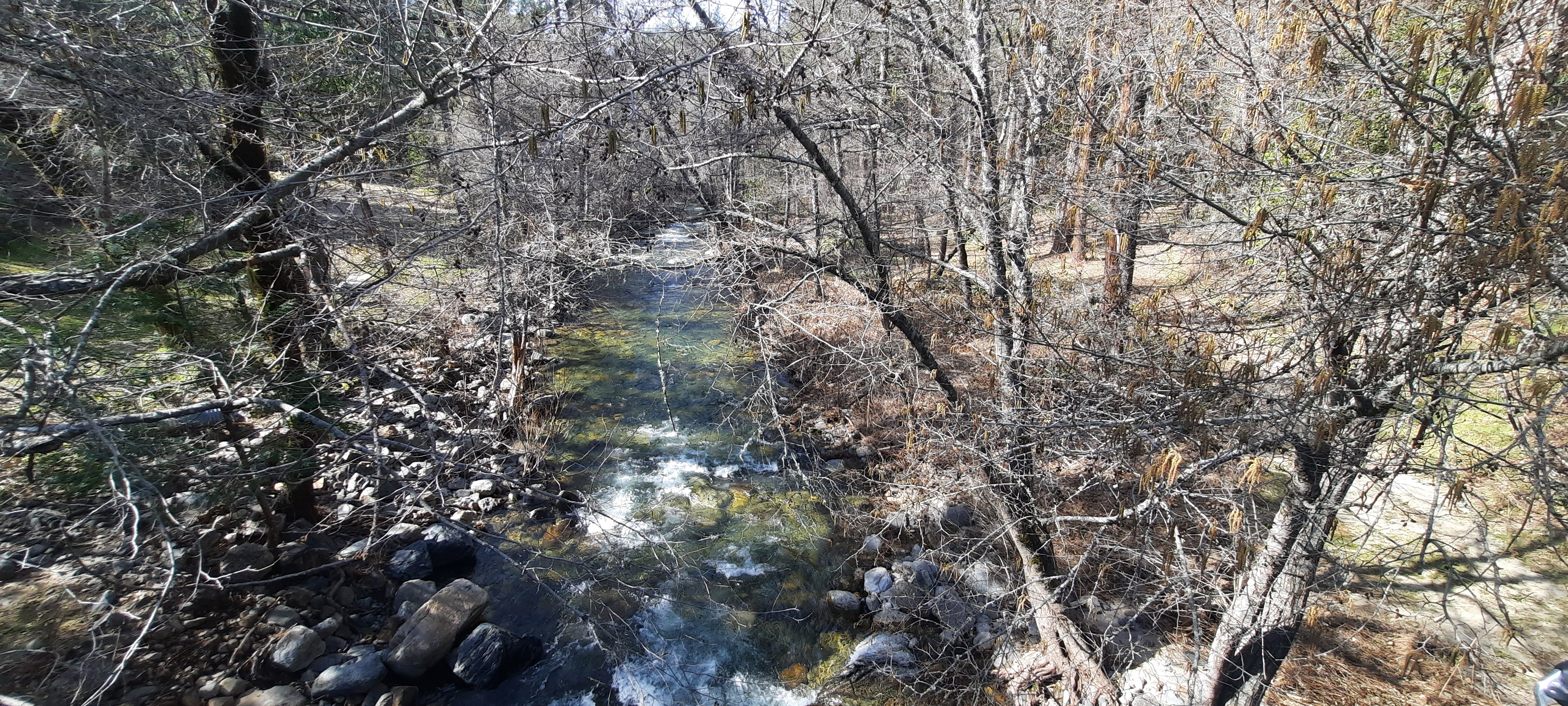

- Location of the North Fork in California

Location
- Country: United States
- State: California

Physical characteristics
- Source: Sierra Nevada
  - location: near Pinecrest
  - coordinates: 38°11′12″N 119°56′07″W
  - elevation: 7,406 ft (2,257 m)
- Mouth: Tuolumne River
  - location: Lake Don Pedro
  - coordinates: 37°53′49″N 120°15′14″W
  - elevation: 853 ft (260 m)
- Length: 35.7 mi (57.5 km)
- Basin size: 69.2 sq mi (179 km^{2})
- Discharge
  - location: near Tuolumne, about 10 mi (16 km) from the mouth
  - average: 54.2 cu ft/s (1.53 m^{3}/s)
  - minimum: 0.66 cu ft/s (0.019 m^{3}/s)
  - maximum: 4,130 cu ft/s (117 m^{3}/s)

Basin features
- Tributaries
  - left: Basin Creek, Hunter Creek (California)

The North Fork Tuolumne River is a 35.7-mile (57.5 km) long river in the central Sierra Nevada of Tuolumne County, California and is a major tributary of the Tuolumne River. It originates above the Dodge Ridge Ski Area about 2 miles (3.2 km) east of Pinecrest, in the Stanislaus National Forest. From there it flows generally southwest, past Long Barn, Twaine Harte, Soulsbyville and Tuolumne. Below Long Barn the river flows through a narrow canyon on its way to join the Tuolumne River, at the head of Lake Don Pedro Reservoir, about 5 miles (8.0 km) north of Groveland.

Like the Clavey River, which flows about parallel to the North Fork several miles to the east and also drains into the Tuolumne River, the North Fork is one of only a few Sierra foothill streams that are undisturbed by major dams or diversions. However, the Turlock Irrigation District has sought at times to dam the North Fork and the Clavey for hydropower generation.

The lower 7.8 miles (12.6 km) of the North Fork is a class V whitewater run from Riverside Campground to the Tuolumne River. Due to the small watershed of the river, it is typically only boatable after heavy rain.

== See also ==
- List of rivers of California
