= Moccasin Dam =

Dam in California, USA

- Interactive map of Moccasin Dam
- Coordinates: 37.8113°N 120.3063°W
- Opening date: 1930; 96 years ago
- Owner: San Francisco PUC

Dam and spillways
- Type of dam: Rockfill
- Impounds: Moccasin Creek
- Height (foundation): 60 ft (18 m)
- Length: 720 ft (220 m)

Reservoir
- Creates: Moccasin Reservoir
- Total capacity: 554 acre⋅ft (683,000 m^{3})
- Catchment area: 25.4 mi^{2} (66 km^{2})

Moccasin Dam is a small dam on Moccasin Creek in Tuolumne County, California, in the town of Moccasin, west of Yosemite. It holds the Moccasin Reservoir. The dam, reservoir and associated hydroelectric power plant are part of the Hetch Hetchy Project, which provide water and power to the city of San Francisco. The dam is located near the junction of Highway 120 and Highway 49.

== History ==
In 1914 Congress approved the Raker Act, allowing San Francisco to construct a dam and reservoir in the Hetch Hetchy Valley of Yosemite National Park for the purpose of public water supply. Due to the large elevation drop between Hetch Hetchy and the city, several hydroelectric power stations were constructed along the 167-mile (269 km) long Hetch Hetchy aqueduct. Construction of the Moccasin Powerhouse began in 1921 and was completed on August 14, 1925. The Powerhouse was designed by San Francisco Architect Henry A. Minton. The Moccasin Dam was completed in 1930 as a regulating afterbay for the Moccasin Powerhouse.

The Moccasin Creek Fish Hatchery was constructed downstream of the dam in 1954, and raises trout for stocking in high elevation streams in the Tuolumne River watershed, and for the nearby, much larger Lake Don Pedro. In 1969, a new powerhouse with more efficient turbines was constructed to replace the original power plant.

A March 2018 storm caused the Moccasin Reservoir to become overburdened with water and debris. The dam started to leak and evacuations were issued for a small number of houses and a campground downstream before water levels subsided. Although interim repairs are still ongoing, the California Division of Dam Safety allowed the dam to resume normal operations on June 6, 2019.

== Specifications ==
Moccasin Dam is a rockfill dam, with a structural height of 60 feet (18 m) and a length of 720 feet (220 m), containing 4,815 cubic yards (3,681 m^{3}) of material. The elevation at the dam crest is 929.5 feet (283.3 m) above sea level. The Moccasin Reservoir has a storage capacity of 554 acre-feet (683,000 m^{3}), and a surface area of 29 acres (12 ha). The reservoir has a natural catchment area of 25.4 square miles (66 km^{2}); however, most of its water is imported through the Hetch Hetchy Project pipelines. In order to protect the high-quality Hetch Hetchy water, local flows from Moccasin Creek are captured upstream and routed through a bypass system that discharges downstream of Moccasin Dam. The bypass includes a small hydroelectric plant with a capacity of 2.9 megawatts (MW).

The main Moccasin Powerhouse is situated at the eastern (upstream) end of the reservoir, and consists of two units with a total capacity of 100 megawatts. In 2004, the powerhouse generated 391 million Kilowatt hours (KWh). In 2009, it generated 348 million KWh. Moccasin is the furthest downstream of San Francisco's three hydroelectric plants (the others are Kirkwood, near Hetch Hetchy Reservoir and Holm near Cherry Lake). Operations at all three plants are coordinated from the control room at Moccasin.

== See also ==
- List of dams and reservoirs in California
