= O'Shaughnessy Dam (California) =

Dam in Tuolumne County, California, United States

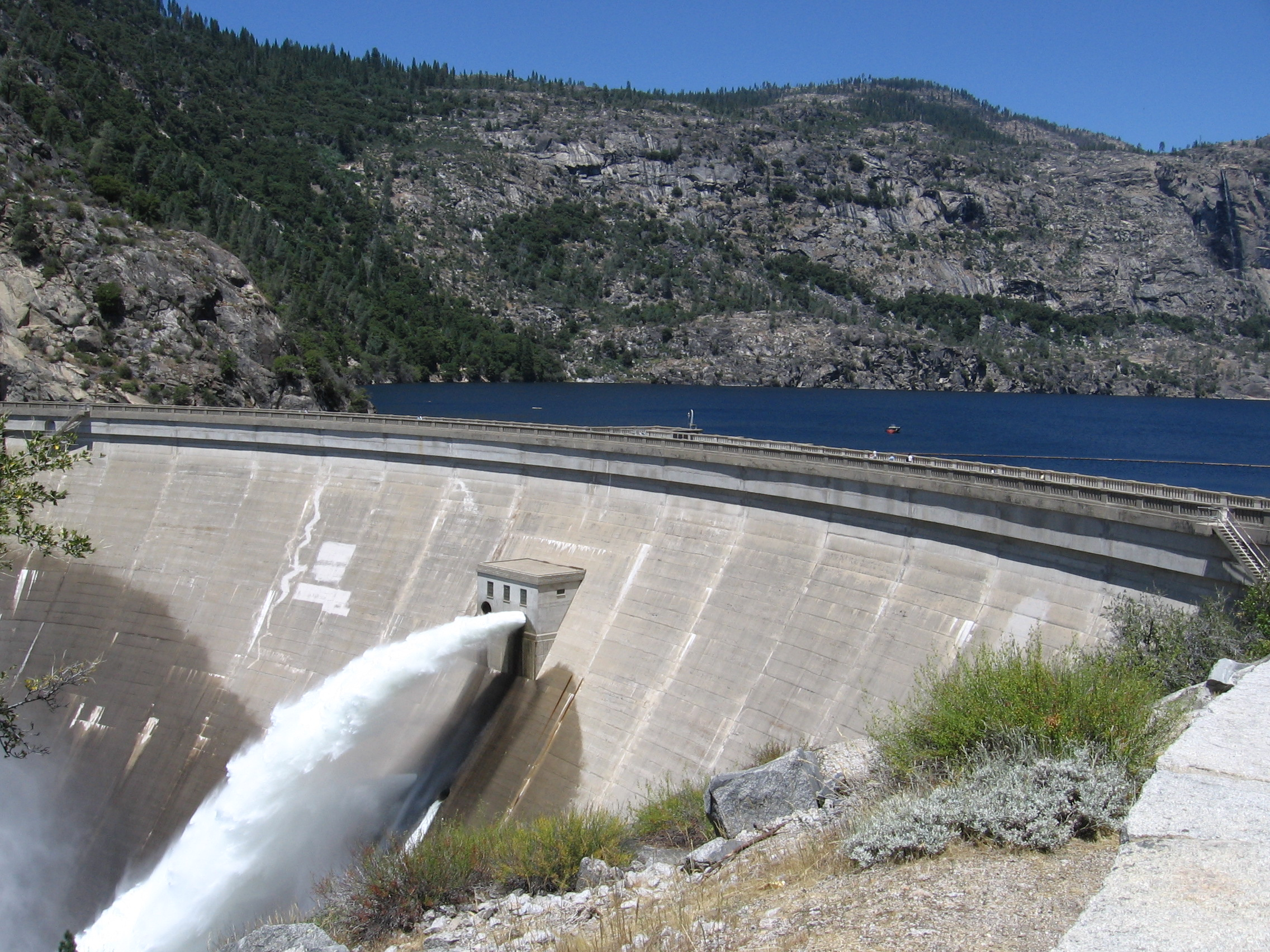

- Location of the O'Shaughnessy Dam in California
- Location: Tuolumne County, California, U.S.
- Coordinates: 37°56′51″N 119°47′18″W
- Purpose: Water supply Hydroelectricity
- Status: Operational
- Construction began: August 1, 1919; 107 years ago
- Opening date: July 7, 1923; 103 years ago
- Owner: San Francisco PUC

Dam and spillways
- Type of dam: Concrete arch gravity
- Impounds: Tuolumne River
- Height: 430 ft (130 m)
- Length: 900 ft (270 m)
- Elevation at crest: 3,812 ft (1,162 m)
- Width (base): 308 ft (94 m)

Reservoir
- Creates: Hetch Hetchy Reservoir
- Total capacity: 360,400 acre⋅ft (444,500,000 m^{3})
- Catchment area: 459 mi^{2} (1,190 km^{2})
- Surface area: 1,972 acres (798 ha)

Power Station
- Turbines: 3 x Pelton turbines at Kirkwood Powerhouse; 2 x Pelton turbines at Moccasin Powerhouse
- Installed capacity: 234 MW
- Annual generation: 976 GWh

O'Shaughnessy Dam is a 430-foot-high (131 m) concrete arch-gravity dam in Tuolumne County, California, United States. It impounds the Tuolumne River, forming the Hetch Hetchy Reservoir at the lower end of Hetch Hetchy Valley in Yosemite National Park, about 160 miles (260 km) east of San Francisco. The dam and reservoir are the source for the Hetch Hetchy Aqueduct, which provides water for over two million people in San Francisco and other municipalities of the west Bay Area. The dam is named for engineer Michael O'Shaughnessy, who oversaw its construction.

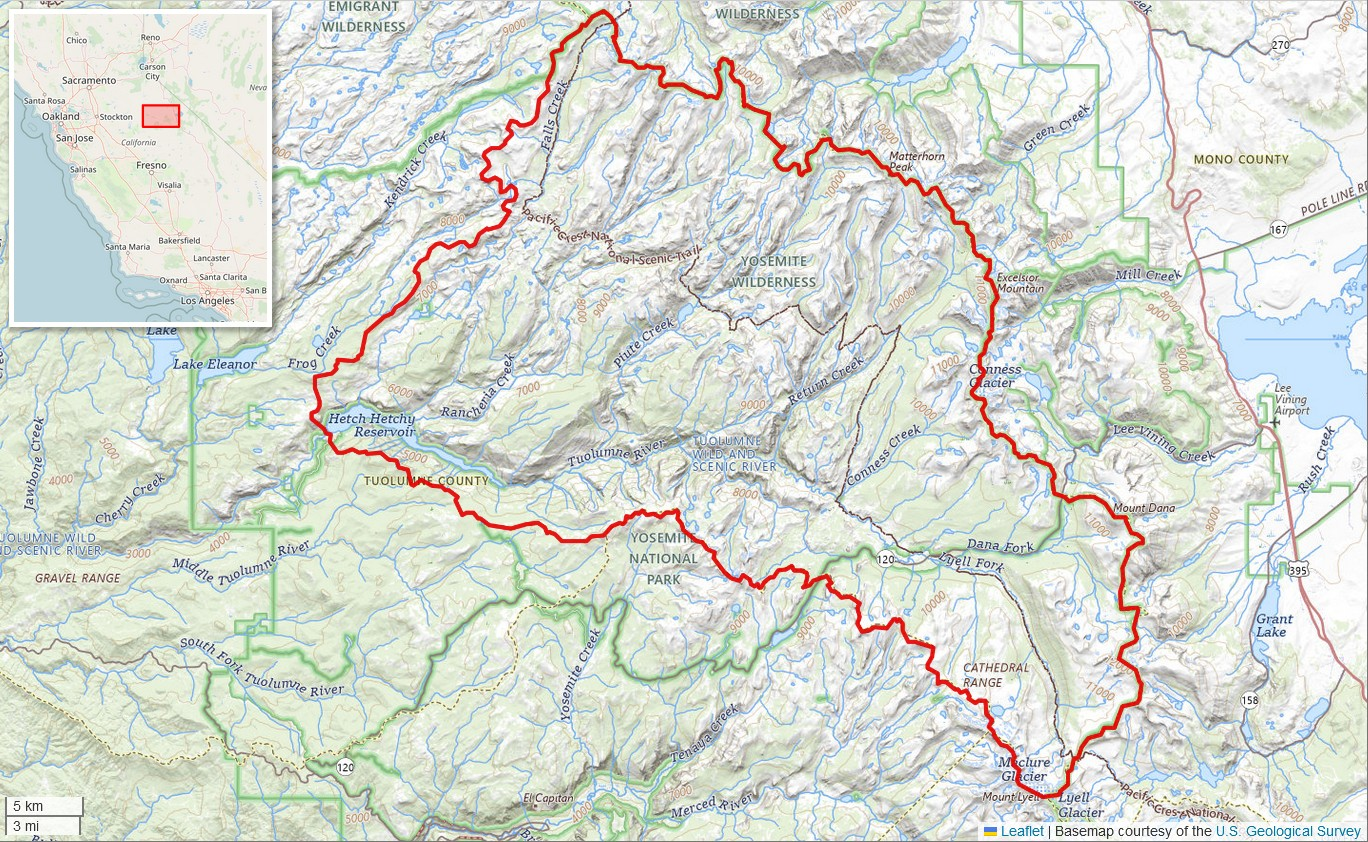
Hetch Hetchy Reservoir watershed (Interactive map)

Although San Francisco had sought Tuolumne River water as early as the 1890s, this project did not move forward until the disastrous earthquake and fire of 1906, which underscored the insufficiency of the existing water supply. The Hetch Hetchy Valley – then compared to Yosemite Valley for its scenic beauty – was chosen for its water quality and hydroelectric potential, but the location within the national park generated controversy. An act of Congress was required to circumvent federal protection of the Tuolumne River, with the reasoning that public land should be developed for the public benefit.

Construction of the dam started in 1919 and was finished in 1923, with the first water delivered in 1934 after numerous delays. From 1935 to 1938, the dam was raised to increase its capacity for water supply and power generation. The dam, aqueduct and appurtenant hydroelectric systems are collectively known as the Hetch Hetchy Project. Deriving from a largely wild and pristine area of the Sierra Nevada, the Hetch Hetchy supply is some of the cleanest municipal water in the US, requiring only primary filtration and disinfection.

Hetch Hetchy represented the first great environmental controversy in the US, and debate over the dam and reservoir continues today. Preservationist groups such as the Sierra Club lobby for the restoration of the valley, while others argue that leaving the dam in place would be the better economic and environmental decision.

== Background ==
In the late 19th century, the city of San Francisco was rapidly outgrowing its limited water supply, which depended on intermittent local springs and streams. The city looked east to the Sierra Nevada, where snowmelt fed the headwaters for many of California's largest rivers. In 1890, San Francisco mayor James D. Phelan proposed to build a dam and aqueduct on the Tuolumne River, one of the largest southern Sierra rivers, as a way to increase and stabilize the city's water supply. In 1900, a United States Geological Survey (USGS) report also described the Tuolumne River as "the best source of sustainable water for San Francisco". Although Phelan managed to secure water rights for the Tuolumne River in 1901, his appeals to the federal government for development of the Hetch Hetchy Valley were unsuccessful. But when the 1906 San Francisco earthquake and subsequent fire razed the city, the dangerous inadequacies of the city's water supply system were brought to national light.

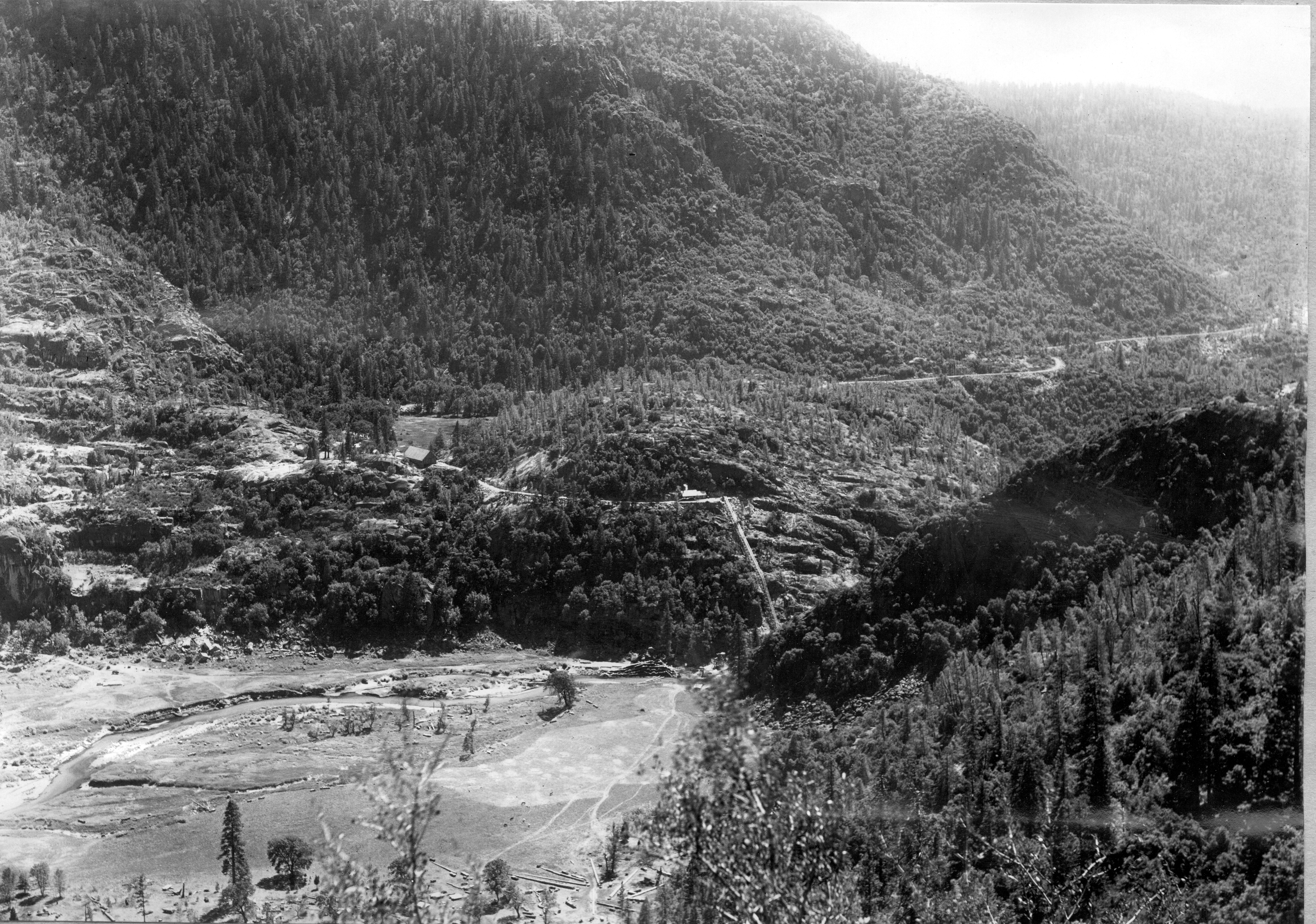
The site of O'Shaughnessy Dam before construction began, c. 1914

Out of fourteen potential water sources considered by the city – which included Lake Tahoe, the Eel River, and tributaries of the Sacramento and San Joaquin Rivers – Hetch Hetchy was considered superior for its excellent dam site, abundant sediment-free water, lower cost and hydroelectric potential. At the time, Hetch Hetchy was an isolated, seldom visited subalpine valley, visited intermittently by gold seekers and sheepherders. However, since 1890, Hetch Hetchy Valley and the surrounding lands had been part of Yosemite National Park and thus off-limits to utility development, let alone at the grand scale proposed by the city. Even though the valley was not well known to the general public, organizations such as the Sierra Club treasured it for its spectacular beauty, often compared to that of Yosemite Valley itself. Led by naturalist and mountaineer John Muir, the Sierra Club adamantly opposed the city of San Francisco as it sought permission from the federal government to build a dam in the valley.

In 1908 Secretary of the Interior James R. Garfield responded to San Francisco's appeal, granting the city rights to development at Hetch Hetchy, stating that "Hetch Hetchy was not unique, a lake would be even more beautiful than its meadow floor and the hydroelectric power generated could eventually pay for the costs of construction." One of the strongest supporters of the Hetch Hetchy project was Gifford Pinchot, Chief Forester of the United States Forest Service, who pushed a policy of "conservation through use", promoting the sustainable development of natural resources in the U.S. On December 19, 1913, President Woodrow Wilson signed the Raker Act, which permitted San Francisco's development of the Hetch Hetchy project on the terms that water and power derived from the project could only be used for public utilities, not private profit. Though highly controversial, the bill passed the Senate by a vote of 43 for and 25 against. The consensus was that since Hetch Hetchy lay on public land, it was reasonable for its natural resources to be developed for the public benefit.

Muir, the Sierra Club and other groups were outraged by the federal government's permission for development at Hetch Hetchy. However, on December 24, 1914, with construction on the dam barely underway, Muir died, leaving his Sierra Club to fight a protracted battle against the Hetch Hetchy Project over the next ten years. "Dam Hetch Hetchy!" Muir had said – "As well dam for water tanks the peoples' cathedrals and churches, for no holier temple has been consecrated by the heart of man!" The Sierra Club argued that it was not necessary for San Francisco to destroy the valley for its water supply, pointing out the availability of other sites with reasonable proximity – including the Mokelumne River, which the U.S. Army Corps of Engineers reported in 1913 as "a better and cheaper source than Hetch Hetchy". (The Mokelumne was later dammed, in a similar scheme to the Hetch Hetchy project, to provide water to the East Bay.) By this point, however, San Francisco had become "obsessed" with developing Hetch Hetchy, and "dismissed or discarded other rivers and valleys that would have served them better ... as if it was created for their purpose."

== Construction ==
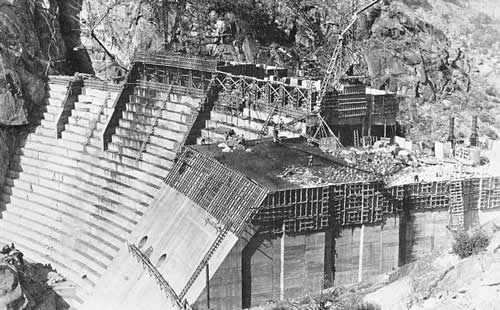
Construction work on the dam in August 1922

Work on the Hetch Hetchy project began in early 1914 shortly after the passage of the Raker Act. The city hired John R. Freeman, who had previously worked on the water supply systems of Boston and New York City, to plan the complex dam and aqueduct system. Civil engineer Michael O'Shaughnessy would oversee the construction and design details of the Hetch Hetchy project. The dam in Hetch Hetchy Valley would subsequently be named in his honor. Before construction of O'Shaughnessy Dam could commence, the city completed a 70-foot (21 m) high dam at Lake Eleanor to provide water for the Early Intake Powerhouse, which was necessary to provide electricity for the construction site of the larger dam.

Initial construction of the dam cost $6,121,000 ($116 million in 2025 dollars), and was largely financed by revenue bonds issued by the city of San Francisco. To transport workers and materials, the city hired Frederick Rolandi, a San Francisco engineer who had previous experience designing railways, to oversee construction the Hetch Hetchy Railroad. The railway would be a 68-mile (109 km) standard gauge line that followed the narrow canyon of the Tuolumne River to the remote dam site. Built from 1915 to 1918 by a workforce of roughly 900, the railway allowed for supplies to be shipped directly from San Francisco along the Southern Pacific and Sierra lines which connected to the Hetch Hetchy line. The railroad principally used geared Shay locomotives to negotiate its dangerous winding curves and steep 4 percent grades.

Actual groundbreaking on O'Shaughnessy Dam was on August 1, 1919, when Utah Construction Company of San Francisco began preparing the dam site for construction. Workers began clearing the trees in Hetch Hetchy Valley to prepare it for receiving waters of the future reservoir. A 20-foot (6.1 m) diameter tunnel, later expanded to 23-by-25-foot (7.0 m × 7.6 m), was dug around the south side of the O'Shaughnessy Dam site, and a timber crib cofferdam diverted the waters of the Tuolumne River into the tunnel during construction. The riverbed on the site of the future dam was excavated over 100 ft (30 m) before hitting the granite bedrock. A retaining wall was poured on the upstream side to prevent water seepage into the foundation hole, and the granite was scoured and artificially roughened to prepare for receiving concrete.

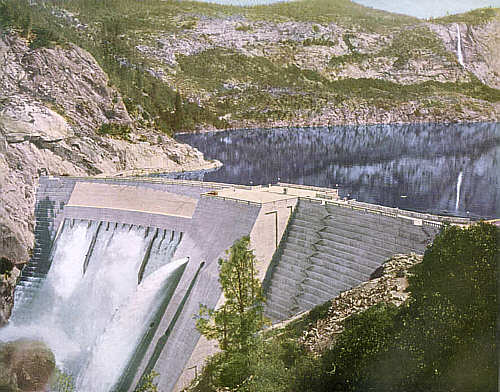
The dam as initially completed in May 1923

The concrete for the dam was processed in a plant located shortly upstream from the construction site, with sand and rock excavated from abundant alluvial deposits in the Hetch Hetchy valley. This was mixed with cement shipped in on the Hetch Hetchy Railroad and local boulders ranging from 1 ft (0.30 m) to several yards (metres) in diameter to produce a cyclopean construction material for the dam. Beginning in September 1921, the concrete was hoisted up a 375-foot (114 m) tower on the south side of the gorge, from which it could flow down movable chutes by gravity to the construction site. A total of 398,516 yd^{3} (304,687 m^{3}) of concrete was poured to form a dam standing 226 feet (69 m) above the riverbed and 344 feet (105 m) above foundations. The last concrete was placed in February 1922 and the dam was completed in May 1923. At the time, it was the second tallest dam in the United States, after Idaho's Arrowrock Dam. On May 24, 1923, the reservoir filled for the first time. A peak labor force of five hundred worked on the project, which claimed the lives of 67 men and one woman.

The first hydropower was delivered in 1925 with the completion of the Moccasin Powerhouse, fed by Hetch Hetchy water through the Canyon and Mountain Tunnels. However, the first water deliveries did not reach San Francisco until 1934, eleven years after the completion of O'Shaughnessy Dam and twenty years after groundbreaking of the Hetch Hetchy project. O'Shaughnessy Dam had been designed with adequate foundations and a unique stepped face in order to make possible a future increase in the dam height. This was done in anticipation of rapid growth in the demand for water and hydroelectricity. Indeed, between 1935 and 1938, the dam was raised by 85 feet (26 m); a new spillway and outlet channels were constructed to accommodate the increased height and storage capacity, which helped to increase summer generation at downstream powerhouses.

== The dam and reservoir today ==
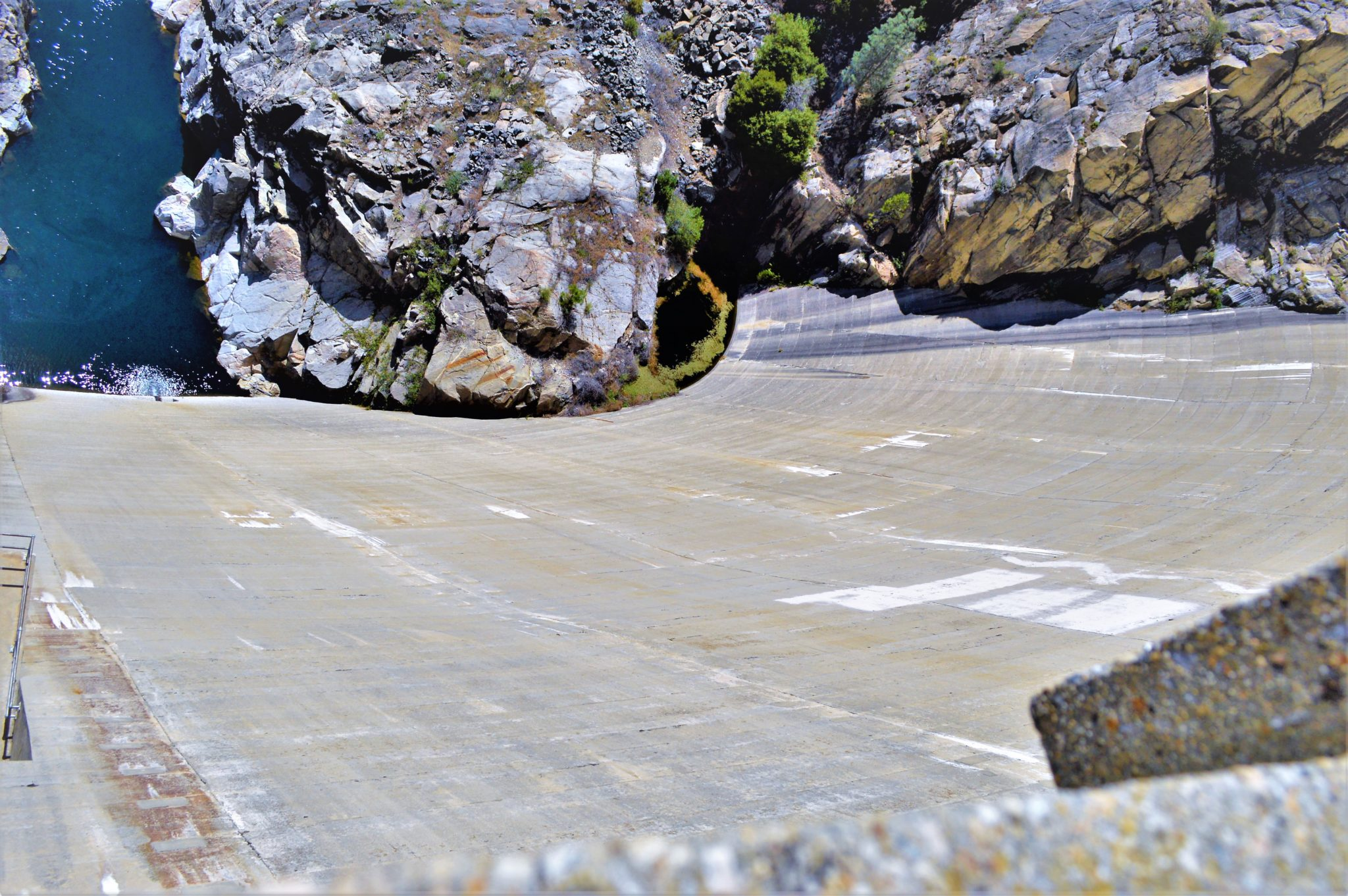
View looking down the O’Shaughnessy Dam at the Tuolumne River

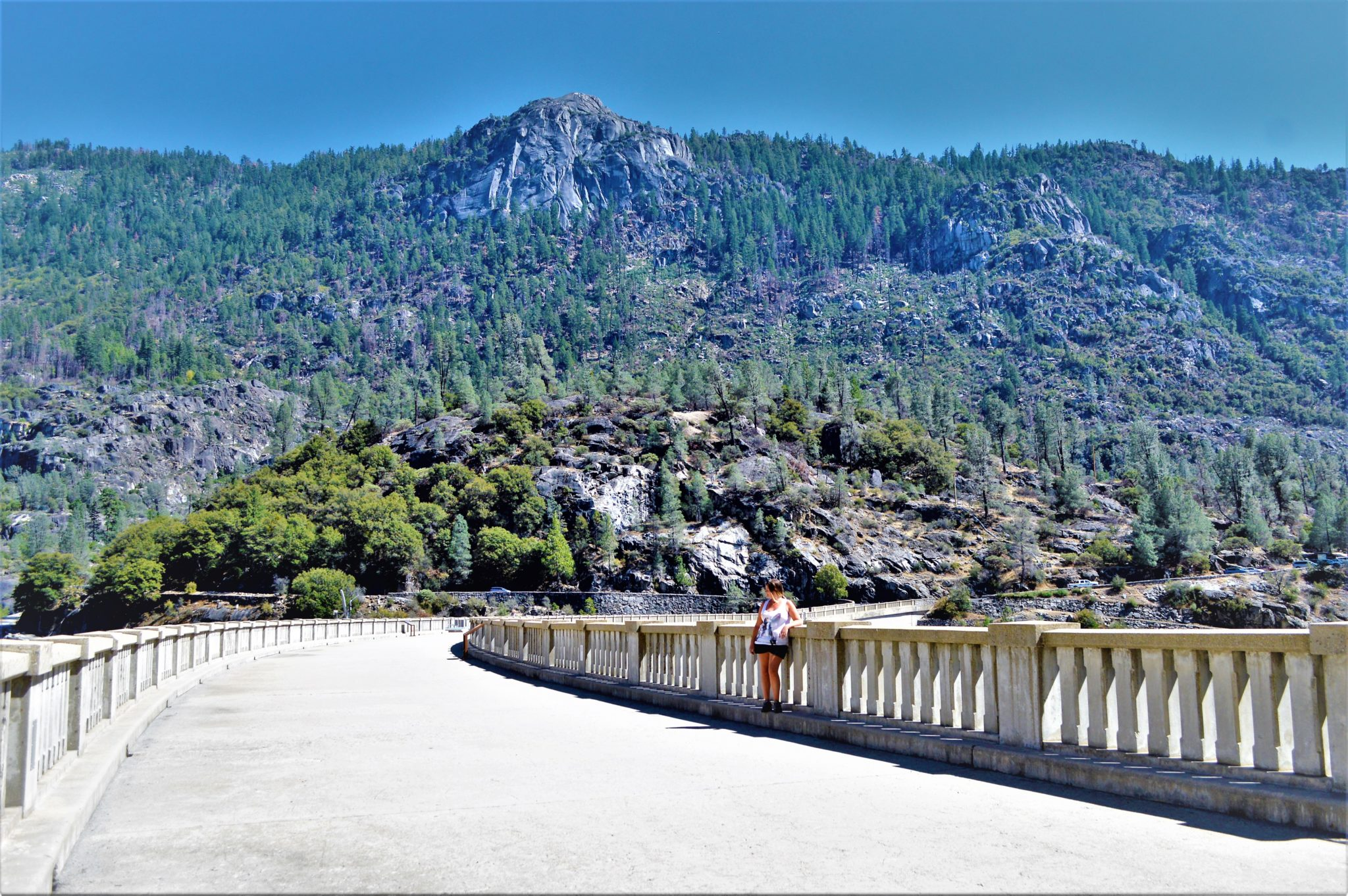
On top of the O’Shaughnessy Dam at Hetch Hetchy reservoir in California

Completed to its final dimensions in 1938, O'Shaughnessy Dam now stands 312 feet (95 m) above the riverbed and 430 feet (130 m) above bedrock. The crest spans 900 feet (270 m) with a 17-foot (5.2 m) wide roadway crossing the top; the thickness of the dam wall reaches a maximum 308 feet (94 m) at the base. Altogether, the structure contains 662,605 yd^{3} (506,598 m^{3}) of concrete and 700,000 pounds (320,000 kg) of steel. Aside from normal water flows through the Canyon Tunnel to the Hetch Hetchy Aqueduct, water is released from the reservoir through eleven jet-flow gates on the dam face and an unlined side spillway controlled by three 65 ft (20 m) wide steel drum gates. With gates lowered, the spillway has a capacity of 48,600 cubic feet per second (1,380 m^{3}/s).

Behind the dam, Hetch Hetchy Reservoir stretches for 8 miles (13 km) along the Tuolumne River, submerging Hetch Hetchy Valley and the lowermost section of the Grand Canyon of the Tuolumne. At maximum capacity, the reservoir stores 360,400 acre-feet (444,500,000 m^{3}), covering 1,972 acres (798 ha). The dam and reservoir receive water from the upper 459 square miles (1,190 km^{2}) of the Tuolumne River watershed, and are supplied with water by Falls Creek, Tiltill Creek, and Rancheria Creek in addition to the main stem of the Tuolumne. Hetch Hetchy is accessed by the Evergreen/Hetch Hetchy Road, which runs 14 miles (23 km) from Big Oak Flat along the Tuolumne River and terminates at the crest of the dam. The road is open seasonally as it is not plowed in the winter months.

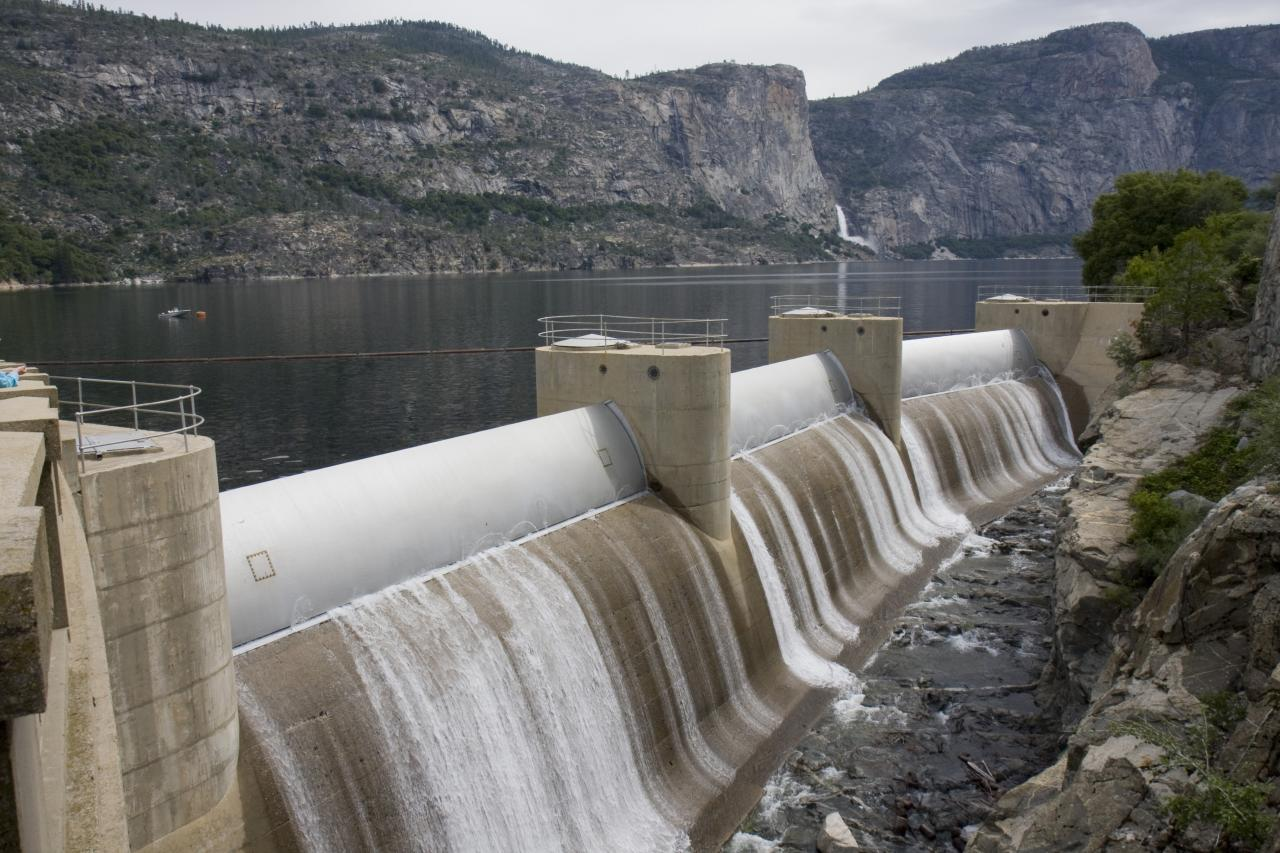
The spillway at O'Shaughnessy Dam

Hetch Hetchy water drives turbines in the Kirkwood and Moccasin Powerhouses located downstream along the Tuolumne River. Kirkwood Powerhouse came online in 1967 with two Pelton units, with a third added in 1987, bringing the total generating capacity to 124 megawatts (MW). Kirkwood is serviced with a hydraulic head of 1,450 feet (440 m) through the Canyon Tunnel, and produces an annual average of 549 million kilowatt hours (KWh). A new powerhouse was built to replace the old Moccasin Powerhouse in 1969. The new Moccasin Powerhouse, located near Lake Don Pedro lower on the Tuolumne River, has a capacity of 110 MW from two Pelton turbines. Moccasin generates 427 million KWh per year, and is fed by Hetch Hetchy water through the Mountain Tunnel, which provides a maximum head of 1,300 feet (400 m).

Water diverted at O'Shaughnessy Dam feeds into the Hetch Hetchy Aqueduct, which provides 85 percent of the municipal water for 2.4 million people in the San Francisco Bay Area. The firm water yield is 265,000 acre-feet (0.327 km^{3}) per year, or 237 million gallons (895,000 m^{3}) per day. Because of the unique geology of the Hetch Hetchy watershed, which consists of shallow soils underlain by solid granite bedrock, water that flows into the reservoir is exceptionally clear and of very high quality. This quality is further maintained by stringent protection of the watershed; boating and swimming are prohibited at Hetch Hetchy Reservoir (although fishing is permitted at the reservoir and in the rivers which feed it). As a result, San Francisco tap water is some of the cleanest in the United States, without even the need for filtration, and is said to be of better quality than most bottled water.

=== Structural statistics of the O'Shaughnessy Dam ===
Statistical information of the first construction installment of the O'Shaughnessy Dam is available at the site of the O'Shaughnessy Dam itself.

Before the height increase installment (pre-1938) the statistical measurements were:

Foundation elevation	3,386 ft 1,032 m
Bottom valves elevation	3,508 ft 1,069 m
Initial crest elevation	3,726 ft 1,136 m
Storage capacity	66,000,000,000 U.S. gallons 2.5×10^{11} liters; 5.5×10^{10} imperial gallons
Drainage area	294,000 acres 119,000 hectares
Reservoir area	1,590 acres 640 hectares

Following the height increase of 86 feet which was implemented in 1938, the structural statistical information changed to:

Height above stream bed	312 ft 95 m
Height above foundation	425 ft 130 m
Crest elevation	3,812 ft 1,162 m
Crest length	800 ft 240 m
Storage capacity	117,300,000,000 U.S. gallons 4.44×10^{11} liters; 9.77×10^{10} imperial gallons
Watershed area	458 mi^{2} 1,190 km^{2}
Reservoir area	1,872 acres 758 hectares

== Proposed Dam Removal ==
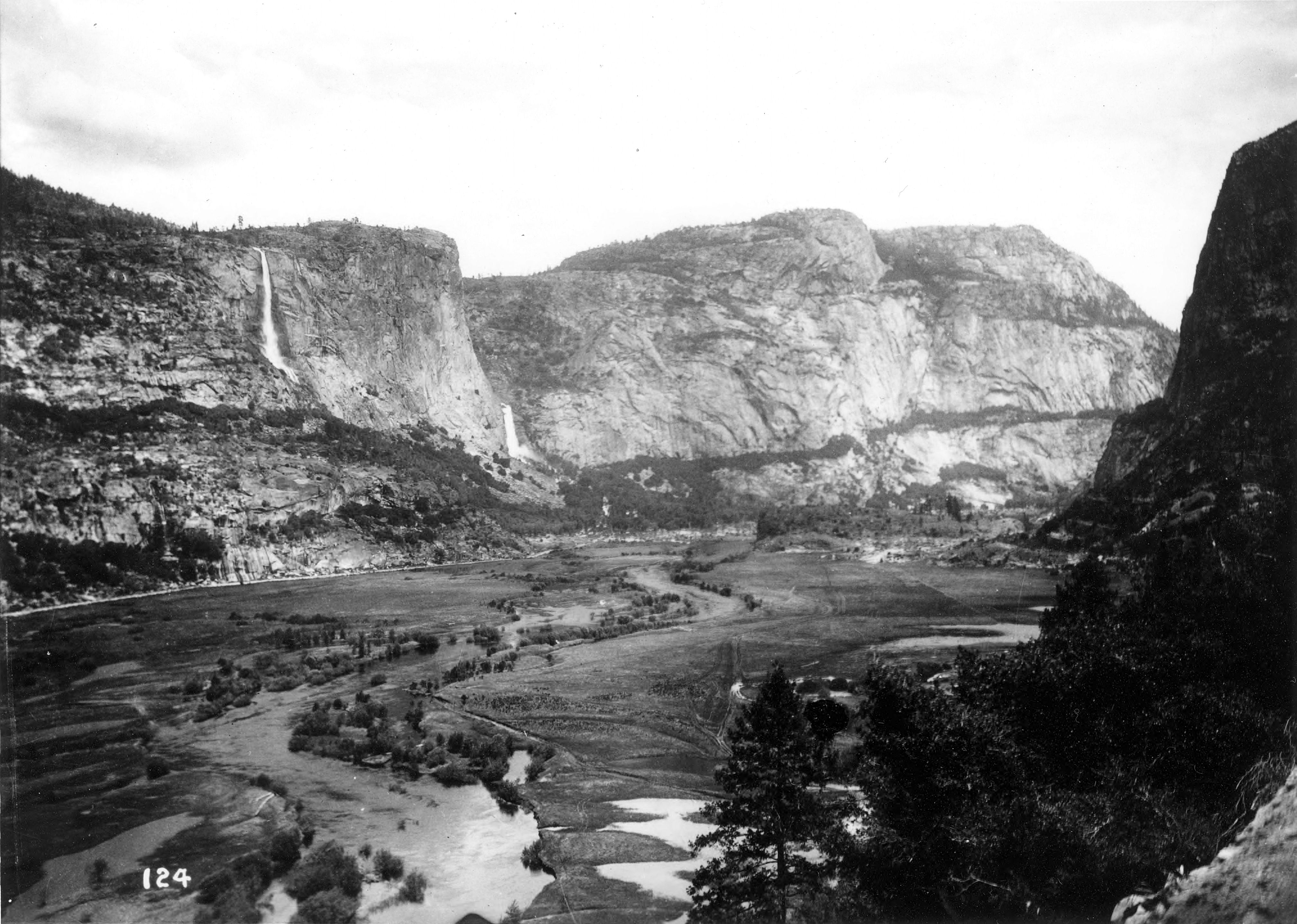
Hetch Hetchy Valley before the damming, c. 1908

O'Shaughnessy Dam has been controversial since its original construction both for its environmental impact and claims regarding violations of the Raker Act by the city of San Francisco. Although the Raker Act explicitly stated that power and water from the Hetch Hetchy Project could be used only for public purposes, San Francisco has sold Hetch Hetchy power to Pacific Gas & Electric (PG&E) since 1925. Dam removal advocates have stated that San Francisco's utilization of Yosemite National Park for water and power is unfair because of the damage to tourism and the local environment caused by the dam and reservoir. By draining the reservoir, removing the dam and restoring the valley to its original state, visitors to the park would once again be able to enjoy the natural beauty of Hetch Hetchy – once compared to that of Yosemite Valley. There are other rivers and reservoirs available for San Francisco to replace the water supply, such as the city's currently unused share of water in Lake Don Pedro, the biggest reservoir on the Tuolumne River.

In 2004, a feasibility report was developed which identified alternatives to O'Shaughnessy Dam. The report provides a planning-level analysis for replacing the water and hydropower benefits that the Hetch Hetchy Reservoir and O’Shaughnessy Dam provide. The report strove to ensure that all solutions must be technologically feasible and affordable and must assure a dependable supply of water to both San Francisco and all affected California communities. The report was peer-reviewed by academic experts and information for the report was provided by the San Francisco Public Utilities Commission, the Bay Area Water Supply and Conservation Agency, and the Turlock and Modesto Irrigation Districts to help ensure an accurate report.

In 2006, researchers from the University of California, Davis published an article in a peer-reviewed journal looking at the implications of removing O'Shaughnessy Dam. The study modeled water availability based on increased water demands and the effects of warmer/dryer hydrologic conditions to the year 2100. The study found that dam removal in combination with other water infrastructure changes had few effects on the Hetch Hetchy water delivery system and delivery of water to San Francisco. The study identified water filtration as one of the major cost factors in removal of the dam.

Opponents of dam removal state that the estimated demolition cost of $3–10 billion is a poor investment, especially in regards of the resulting loss of renewable hydroelectric power, which would have to be replaced by polluting fossil fuel generation. Although there are several options available to replace San Francisco's water, none are of the purity currently supplied by Hetch Hetchy. There is also no guarantee that the valley can be successfully restored, as the original valley floor was actually the product of thousands of years of intensive controlled burning and management by the native Paiute and Miwok peoples that once lived in the area. Without this intervention, a forest would grow in the place of the valley's renowned meadows. Finally, the increased pressure of new tourism could cause its own environmental damage, as has been demonstrated in the crowded Yosemite Valley.

Despite the hotly contested status of O'Shaughnessy Dam in the environmental field, and occasional federal money set aside for studying alternatives to Hetch Hetchy – such as $7 million provided by President George W. Bush in 2007 in the National Park Service budget – local support for its removal is relatively low. In 2012, San Francisco voters rejected Proposition F, which would have ordered the city to study the removal of O'Shaughnessy Dam and draft a plan to replace Hetch Hetchy water, by a vote of 77 percent against. Proposition F would have allocated $8 million to create a feasibility study by 2016; new water delivery and filtration systems would have to be in place by 2025 and Hetch Hetchy Reservoir would have to be drained by 2035.

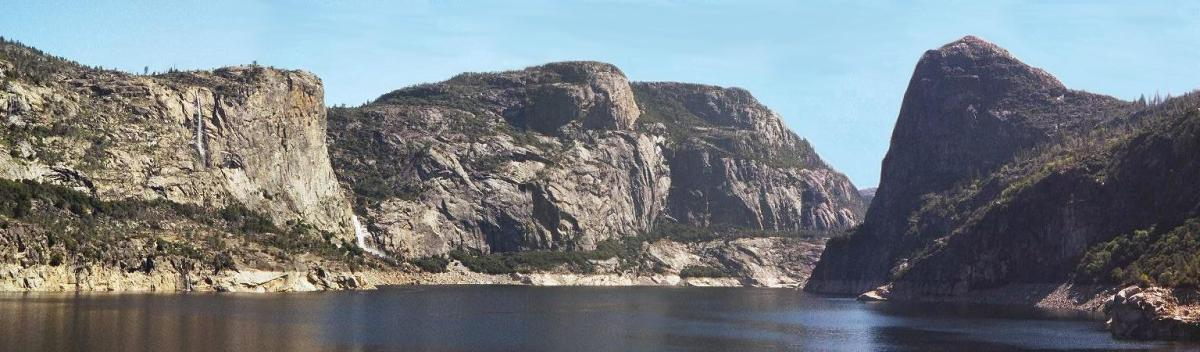
Hetch Hetchy Reservoir as seen from the dam

== See also ==
- List of largest reservoirs of California
- List of power stations in California
- List of the tallest dams in the United States
- Pulgas Water Temple
- San Francisco Public Utilities Commission

== Works cited ==
- Davies, Leslie T. (May 2006). "San Francisco-Hetch Hetchy Valley Connection" (PDF). Humboldt State University. Archived from the original (PDF) on 2016-03-04.
- Glennon, Robert Jerome (2009). Unquenchable: America's Water Crisis and What To Do About It. Island Press. ISBN 978-1-59726-639-0.
- Hennessey, Beverly (2012). Hetch Hetchy. Images of America. Arcadia Publishing. ISBN 978-0-7385-9322-7.
- Righter, Robert W. (2005). The Battle Over Hetch Hetchy: America's Most Controversial Dam and the Birth of Modern Environmentalism. Oxford University Press. ISBN 978-0-19-514947-0.
- Starr, Kevin (1997). Endangered Dreams: The Great Depression in California. Oxford University Press. ISBN 978-0-19-511802-5.
- Taylor, Ray W. (1926). Hetch Hetchy: the story of San Francisco's struggle to provide a water supply for her future needs. R.J. Orozco.
