= Moccasin, California =

Unincorporated community in California, United States

- Unincorporated place
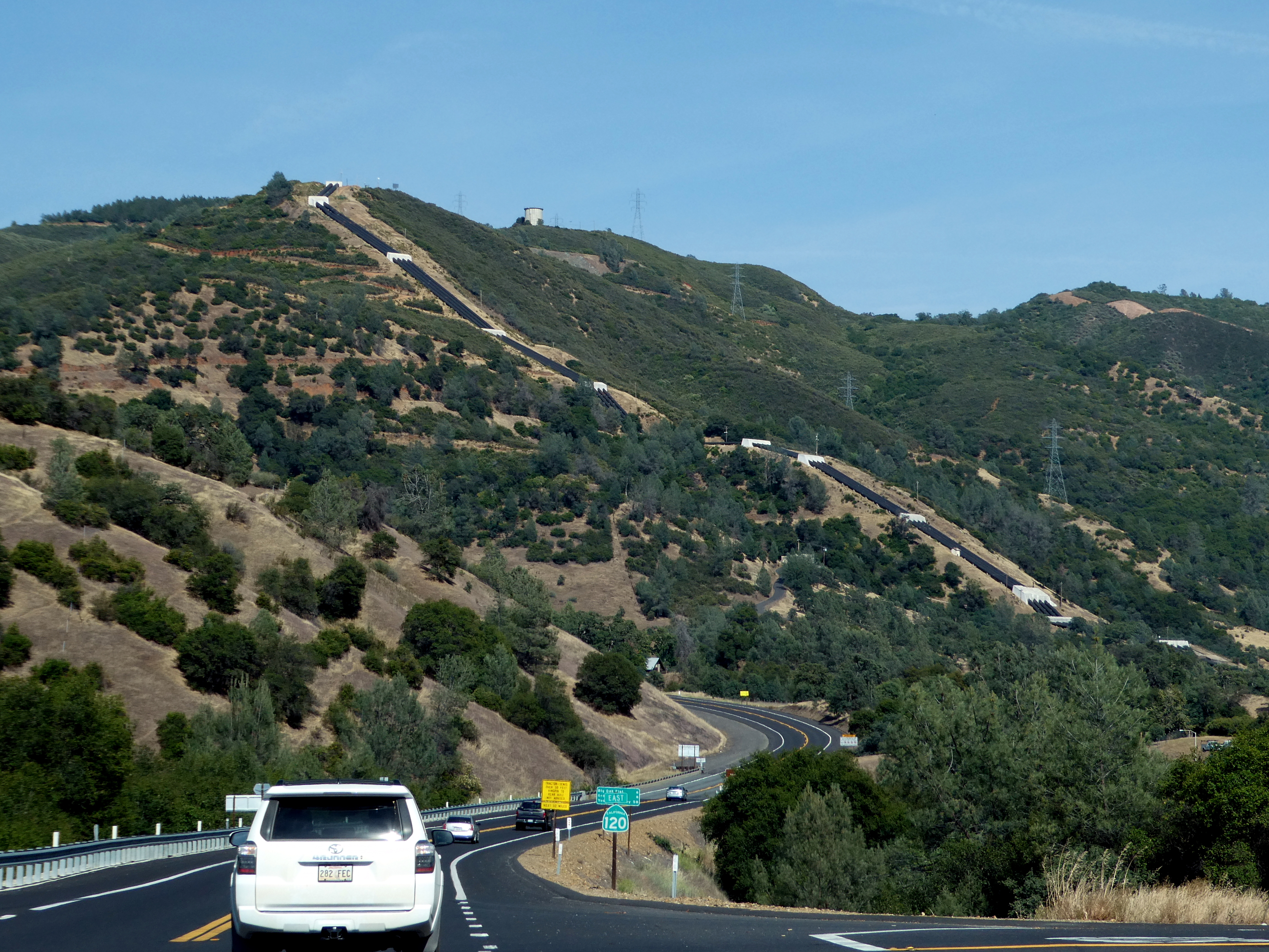
- Hetch Hetchy Aqueduct at Moccasin in 2022

- Location in California
- Coordinates: 37°48′39″N 120°18′0″W
- Country: United States
- State: California
- County: Tuolumne
- Elevation: 935 ft (285 m)
- Time zone: UTC−8 (Pacific)
  - Summer (DST): UTC−7 (PDT)
- ZIP code: 95347
- Area code: 209
- FIPS code: 06-48326
- GNIS feature ID: 1659150

Moccasin, an unincorporated community in Tuolumne County, California, United States, is located at the intersection of State Route 49 and State Route 120. The community is sited on the shore of Moccasin Reservoir at the edge of Lake Don Pedro. The town is home to a State of California Resources Agency, Department of Fish and Game fish hatchery.

A fire July 3, 2006, burned 1,998 acres (8.09 km^{2}) near Moccasin Powerhouse according to the California Department of Forestry. The three million dollar fire involved 40 engines, four helicopters and nine bulldozers.

== Hetch Hetchy relationship ==
Probably California's last company town, Moccasin is almost entirely owned by the City and County of San Francisco. Homes are used for employees who work on the Hetch Hetchy Water and Power system, and most visitors arrive to work on the project. There are no stores or gas stations. Most buildings are painted the same color and homes in the community look similar as a result.

Construction on the original Moccasin Powerhouse, designed by San Francisco architect Henry A. Minton, was started in Fall 1921. The facility was completed and began generating power on August 14, 1925.

Paul James Ost was the electrical engineer put in charge of power operations and electrical engineering phases of the Hetch Hetchy project.

"Paul assembled the Moccasin Powerhouse. He went back east to gather all the parts from multiple companies including Westinghouse and General Electric and personally directed the construction of the electrical sections of the powerhouse. The powerhouse was at one time called the 'Ost Powerhouse'."

— Mary(Molly) Ford\Ost ~1950

The original powerhouse was removed from operation February 7, 1969.

The present-day Moccasin Powerhouse was completed and placed in operation January 27, 1969. The facility's rated capacity is 100,000 kVA and there is a second 3,000 kVA generator called Moccasin Low Head Generating Plant, (completed 1986). The town site is a significant facility along the Hetch Hetchy Aqueduct system.

== History ==
During the Gold Rush, the locale was a stage coach stop on Big Oak Flat Road. A covered bridge was built to allow crossing of Moccasin Creek during the wet season. There was a mining camp along Moccasin Creek and east of town along Priest Grade. Robberies were frequent during years when gold miners were successful in the area.

== Priest Grade and Old Priest Grade ==
Immediately east of town, State Route 120 climbs from about 910 feet (280 m) AMSL elevation to roughly 2,450 feet (750 m) at Priest, over a distance of 4.5 miles (10 km). Old Priest Grade, a narrower road and predecessor to the current route of SR120, covers the same change in elevation over approximately 1.8 miles (2.9 km). It is common to see vehicles with smoking brakes descending the old grade. During summer, ambient temperatures can be in the 90~100 °F range. In these temperatures, many vehicles overheat climbing the old grade. For this reason, bottles of water are available at turnouts along Old Priest Grade to fill overheating vehicles. A sign on Highway 120 also advises drivers to turn off air conditioning in order to prevent overheating while climbing either grade. Locals tell stories of car accidents in history where the vehicles left the path of Old Priest Grade and tumbled into Grizzly Gulch. The hillsides are sturdy chaparral with thick vegetation. The terrain was so difficult that, in a few cases, the cars and bodies were not retrieved, some locals claim. Construction to widen curves and add guard rails began in July 2010.

== Government ==
In the California State Legislature, Moccasin is in the 8th senatorial district, represented by Democrat Angelique Ashby, and in the 5th Assembly district, represented by Republican Joe Patterson.

In the United States House of Representatives, Moccasin is in California's 5th congressional district, represented by Republican Tom McClintock.
