= James E. Roberts Bridge =

- Coordinates: 37.8394°N 120.3785°W
- Carries: SR 120 / SR 49
- Crosses: Tuolumne River
- Locale: Tuolumne County, California
- Other name: Tuolumne River Bridge
- Named for: James E. Roberts

Characteristics
- Design: Richard "Dick" Dokken, PE
- Material: Concrete
- Total length: 1400 ft
- Width: 2 lanes
- Height: 230ft

History
- Opened: 1971

Location
- Interactive map of James E. Roberts Bridge

The James E. Roberts Memorial Bridge is a 1,400 foot two-lane highway bridge along the California State Route 120/California State Route 49 concurrency, in Tuolumne County, California. The bridge spans the Tuolumne River just north of Lake Don Pedro, near the community of Chinese Camp. It opened in 1971.

Originally named the Tuolumne River Bridge, it was renamed in 2007 in honor of James E. Roberts by legislative resolution. Roberts was the California Department of Highways (now, Caltrans) project manager, his first project management assignment as a senior bridge engineer. The cost to create new highway signs was raised by private donations.

== Designers ==
Key members of the Tuolumne River Bridge project, in addition to Mr. Roberts, were Richard "Dick" Dokken, PE, as lead design engineer; M. Comacho, PE, as details and quantities engineer, George Amaro, PE, as specifications engineer; and R. J LeBeau, PE, and K. C. Blechinger, PE, as independent design checkers. Herbert K. Jensen, PE, was Resident Engineer for Bridge Construction, and John F. Harrington, PE, was assistant resident engineer.

This bridge, located west of Yosemite, was necessitated by a new highway alignment the resulted from creation of the new Don Pedro Dam reservoir. James Roberts laid out the bridge on a horizontal curve with a 1,200 foot radius curve to meet the requests of the highway engineers. Large bridges of this size were normally built straight, and California bridges required a detailed seismic analysis.

Normal weight concrete was used for foundations or bridge piers and lightweight concrete was used for the bridge deck. The superstructure was painted steel curved girders trucked into the site.

The bridge had to be completed prior to the filling of the reservoir. The tallest column is about 230 feet high, so falsework for concrete superstructure was not practicable. The highway engineers requested that the bridge have a capability to be widened from 2-lanes of traffic to 4-lanes, as planning at the time assumed that a wider highway would be necessary by 1995. The columns and foundation system were thus designed to support a second superstructure. However, as of 2016, the highway and bridge remain at two lanes width, as the majority of north–south freeway traffic in central California is on I-5 or State Highway 99 in the relatively flat Central Valley. The nearby Highway 49 is a winding, scenic highway that follows the contours of the foothills of the Sierra Nevada Mountain range.

The top 70 feet of the bridge columns have an equilateral triangular shape to support the four lanes of proposed superstructure. The initial 2-lanes were placed on the outside radius, so eccentric loading analysis of the columns was necessary. The foundation was excavated rock and is essentially hexagonal in shape to stabilize the column. The column is reasonably complicated and attractive.

== Contractor ==
Peter Kiewit and Sons built the bridge as general contract with a gravel access road using switchbacks into the sides of the Tuolumne River canyon walls. Custom steel column forms were manufactured at an on site concrete batch plant. The San Jose Steel Company was the steel superstructure fabricator. Pieces were brought in by rail and truck. After column completion, steel girders were erected from the canyon floor, lifted from the cantilevered tips of the north and south girders.

The bridge opened to traffic in 1971. The designers received an AISC Medium Span Steel Bridge award in 1972 and a James F. Lincoln Arc Welding Foundation Award. The AISC jurors wrote "this gracefully sweeping bridge fits beautifully into its setting. The clean curving superstructure and the sculptured piers are very pleasing."

== Selected References ==
1. Dokken Richard A., Salveson Matthew, James E. Roberts – More than an Engineer's Engineer. ASCE Structure Magazine, Feb 2009, pp 48–49

2. Roberts, James E., Dokken Richard A., Golden Gate of the Motherload, Modern Welded Structures, Volume VI, James F. Lincoln Arc Welding, Cleveland, OH, ( 1st Edition, Nov 1980) pp A-67 to A-70.

3. AISC, AISC Prize Bridges -1972, American Institute of Steel Construction pages 8 & 9, 1972 pp 33

4. Roberts, James E., Effects of curing and falsework support periods on dead load deflections of reinforced concrete slab bridges: final report / prepared in cooperation with the U.S. Dept. of transportation, Federal Highway Administration 1972 California Department of Highways Caltrans

5. Roberts, James E., Esthetics in concrete bridge design / editors, Stewart C. Watson, M.K. Hurd. American Concrete Institute

6. Roberts, James E., Marquez, T., Huang, C, Mangus A., Dykes, B., Marlow S., Rea1igning Ca1ifornia's 1-880 Freeway. Concrete International January 2000 pp. 22–27.

7. Roberts, James E., Maroney Brian Chapter 40 Seismic Retrofit Practice, Bridge Engineering Handbook, 1St ed., Chen, Wai-Fah, Duan Lian Ed., CRC Press, Boca Raton Florida, (1999).

8. Roberts, James E., Maloney Brian, Theory of California seismic bridge design and analysis for the beginner (Division of Structures, California Dept. of Transportation.

9. Alden, Don, et al. Oral History James E Roberts, California Department of Transportation Caltrans, pp

10. Kempton, Will, Land Richard, et al. James E. Roberts Memorial, California Department of Transportation, [Caltrans], DVD, 59 minutes

11. Roberts, James E., 50-Years as bridge engineer History James E Roberts, California Department of Transportation [Caltrans], DVD, March 14, 2001,

11. Wilson, Bill, Nothing Earth-Shattering –Roebling Medal, Roads & Bridges Magazine, August 2001, www.ROADSBRIDGES.com pp 24–25
