= Buck Meadows, California =

Buck Meadows
- Census designated place
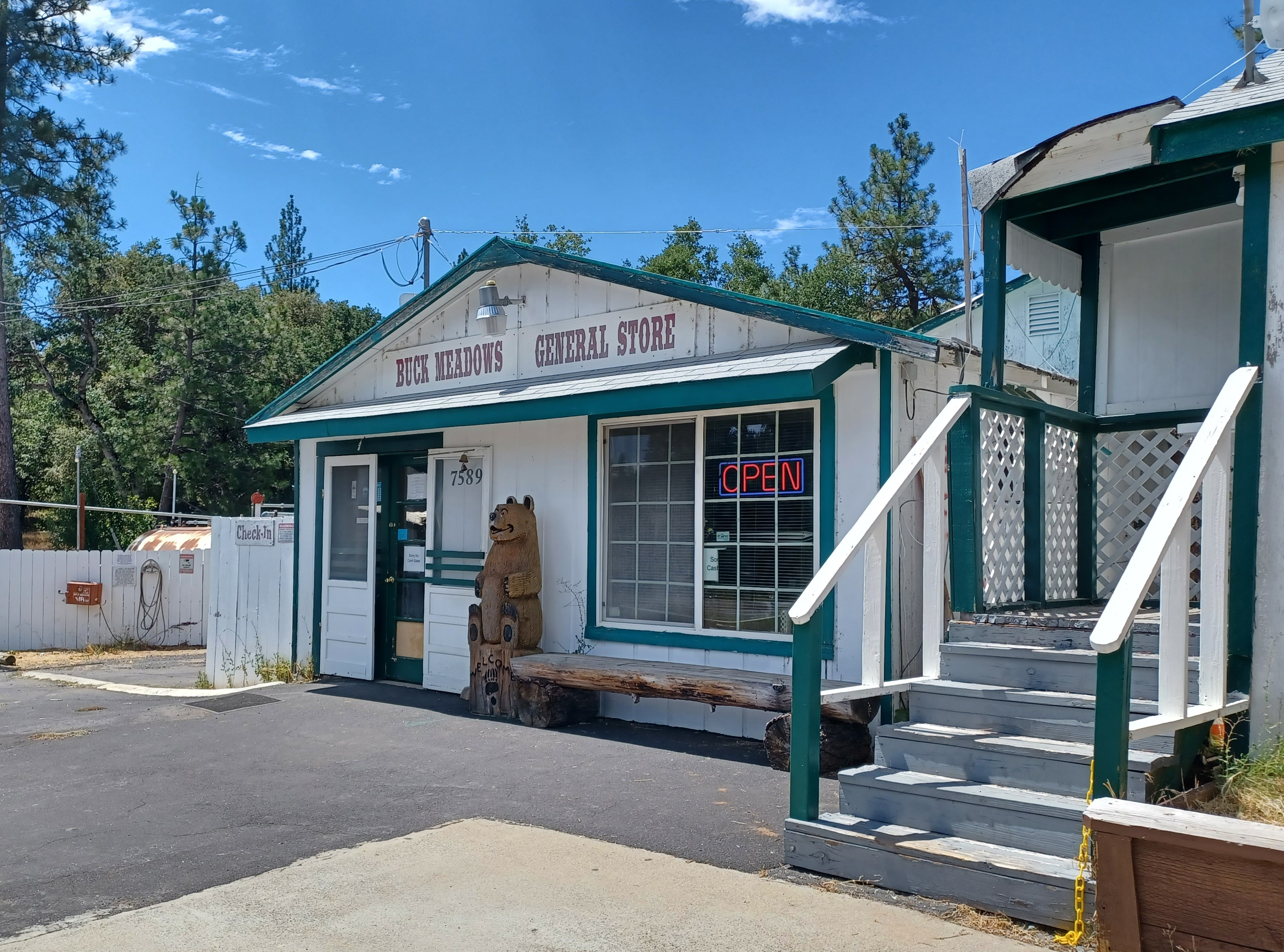
- Buck Meadows General Store

- Location in Mariposa County, California

- Location in the United States
- Coordinates: 37°48′19″N 120°04′10″W
- Country: United States
- State: California
- County: Mariposa

Area
  - Total: 0.535 sq mi (1.39 km^{2})
  - Land: 0.535 sq mi (1.39 km^{2})
  - Water: 0.00 sq mi (0 km^{2})
- Elevation: 2,910 ft (890 m)

Population (2020)
  - Total: 21
- Time zone: UTC-8 (Pacific)
  - Summer (DST): UTC-7 (PDT)
- ZIP code: 95321 (Groveland)
- GNIS feature ID: 2582952
- FIPS code: 06-08716

Buck Meadows (formerly Hamilton's and Hamilton's Station) is a census-designated place in Mariposa County, California, United States. The community is located 2 miles (3 km) east-northeast of Smith Peak, at an elevation of 2,910 feet (890 m). The population was 21 at the 2020 census.

Buck Meadows lies just south of the Tuolumne County line. It is on State Route 120, 11 miles (18 km) east of Groveland. The ZIP Code for this community is shared with Groveland (95321), and wired telephones work out of Groveland's telephone exchange with numbers following the format (209) 962-xxxx.

The area is named for Buck's Meadow 37°48′43″N 120°07′07″W which lies at the corner of SR120 and Smith Station Road. According to The Big Oak Flat Road, a variant name for the area was Hamilton's Station. This may have referred to the name of a stagecoach stop.

2.5 miles (4.0 km) east of U.S.F.S. Buck Meadows Fire Station, "Rim of the World" overlooks the canyon containing the South Fork of the Tuolumne River.

== History ==
Buck Meadows started as a stage stop called Hamilton's established by Alva Hamilton in the 1870s. A post office operated at Buck Meadows from 1915 to 1925.

== Geography ==
According to the United States Census Bureau, the CDP covers 0.535 square miles (1.386 km^{2}), all land.

=== Climate ===
According to the Köppen Climate Classification system, Buck Meadows has a warm-summer Mediterranean climate, abbreviated "Csa" on climate maps.

== Demographics ==
Historical population
| Census | Pop. | Note | %± |
|---|---|---|---|
| 2010 | 31 | | — |
| 2020 | 21 | | −32.3% |
U.S. Decennial Census; 1850–1870 1880-1890; 1900 1910 1920; 1930 1940 1950; 1960 1970 1980; 1990 2000 2010

Buck Meadows first appeared as a census designated place in the 2010 U.S. census.

The 2010 United States census reported that Buck Meadows had a population of 31. The population density was 17.8 inhabitants per square mile (6.9/km^{2}). The racial makeup of Buck Meadows was 23 (74.2%) White, no African American, no Native American, no Asian, no Pacific Islander, 5 (16.1%) from other races, and 3 (9.7%) from two or more races. Hispanic or Latino of any race were 7 persons (22.6%).

The census reported that 100% of the population lived in households.

There were 15 households, out of which 2 (13.3%) had children under the age of 18 living in them, 6 (40.0%) were opposite-sex married couples living together, none had a female householder with no husband present, 1 (6.7%) had a male householder with no wife present. There were no unmarried opposite-sex partnerships, and no same-sex married couples or partnerships. 8 households (53.3%) were made up of individuals, and 4 (26.7%) had someone living alone who was 65 years of age or older. The average household size was 2.07. There were 7 families (46.7% of all households); the average family size was 3.29.

The population was spread out, with 7 people (22.6%) under the age of 18, none aged 18 to 24, 9 people (29.0%) aged 25 to 44, 8 people (25.8%) aged 45 to 64, and 7 people (22.6%) who were 65 years of age or older. The median age was 44.5 years. For every 10 females, there were 21 males. For every 1 female age 18 and over, there were 2 males.

There were 37 housing units at an average density of 21.2 per square mile (8.2/km^{2}), of which 4 (26.7%) were owner-occupied, and 11 (73.3%) were occupied by renters. The homeowner vacancy rate was 0%; the rental vacancy rate was 63.3%. 5 people (16.1% of the population) lived in owner-occupied housing units and 26 people (83.9%) lived in rental housing units.

== Politics ==
In the California State Legislature, Buck Meadows is in the 4th senatorial district, represented by Republican Marie Alvarado-Gil, and in the 8th Assembly district, represented by Republican David Tangipa.

In the United States House of Representatives, Buck Meadows is in California's 5th congressional district, represented by Republican Tom McClintock.

== See also ==
- Pine Mountain Lake, California

== Sources ==
- Map: "Jawbone Ridge, California," 7.5-minute quadrangle, U.S. Geological Survey.
- Map: "Stanislaus National Forest, California," U.S. Forest Service, 1979.
- U.S. Bureau of the Census
