= Priest, California =

Unincorporated community in California, United States

Coordinates: 37°48′51″N 120°16′22″W

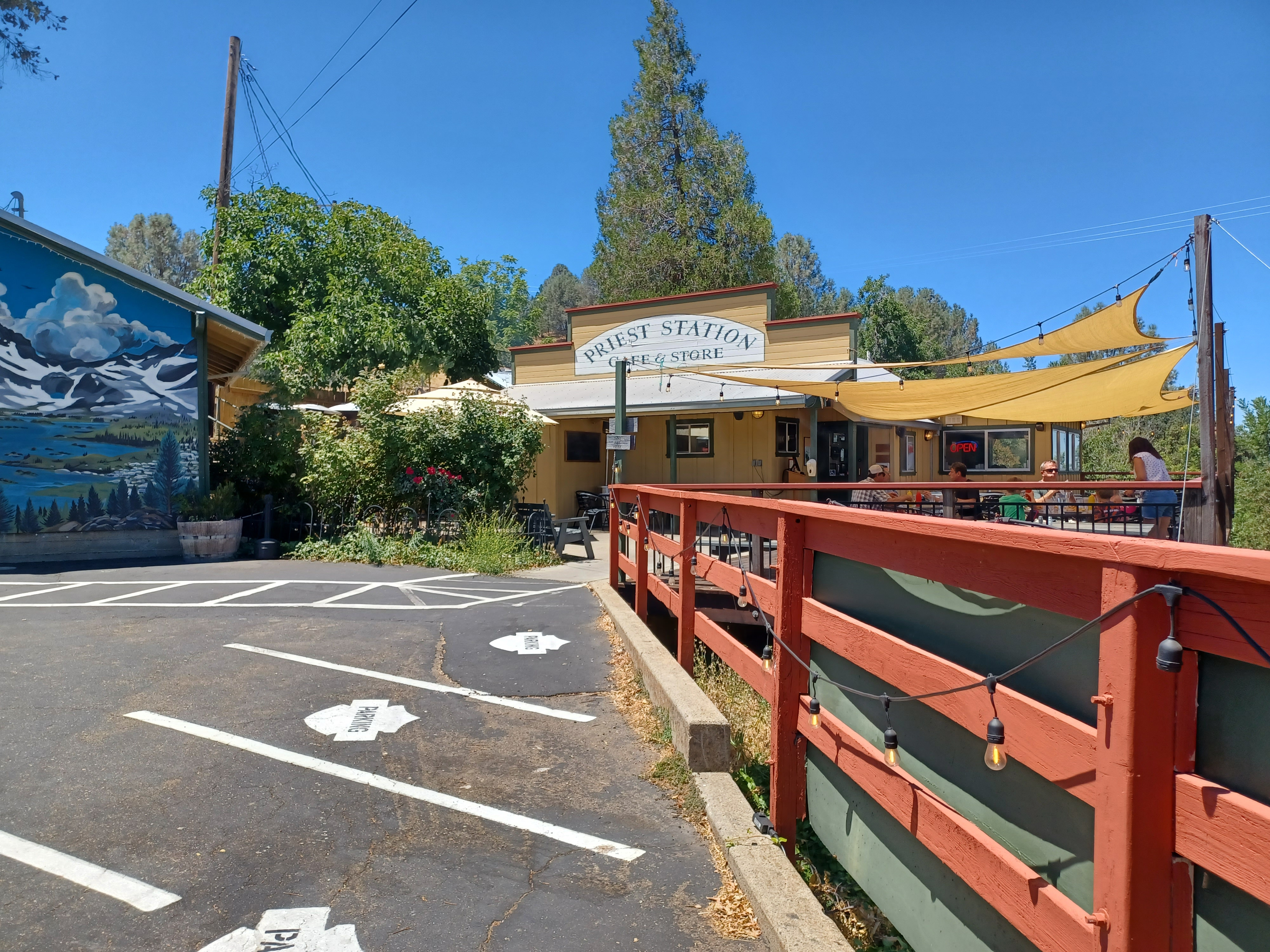
Priest Station Cafe & Store

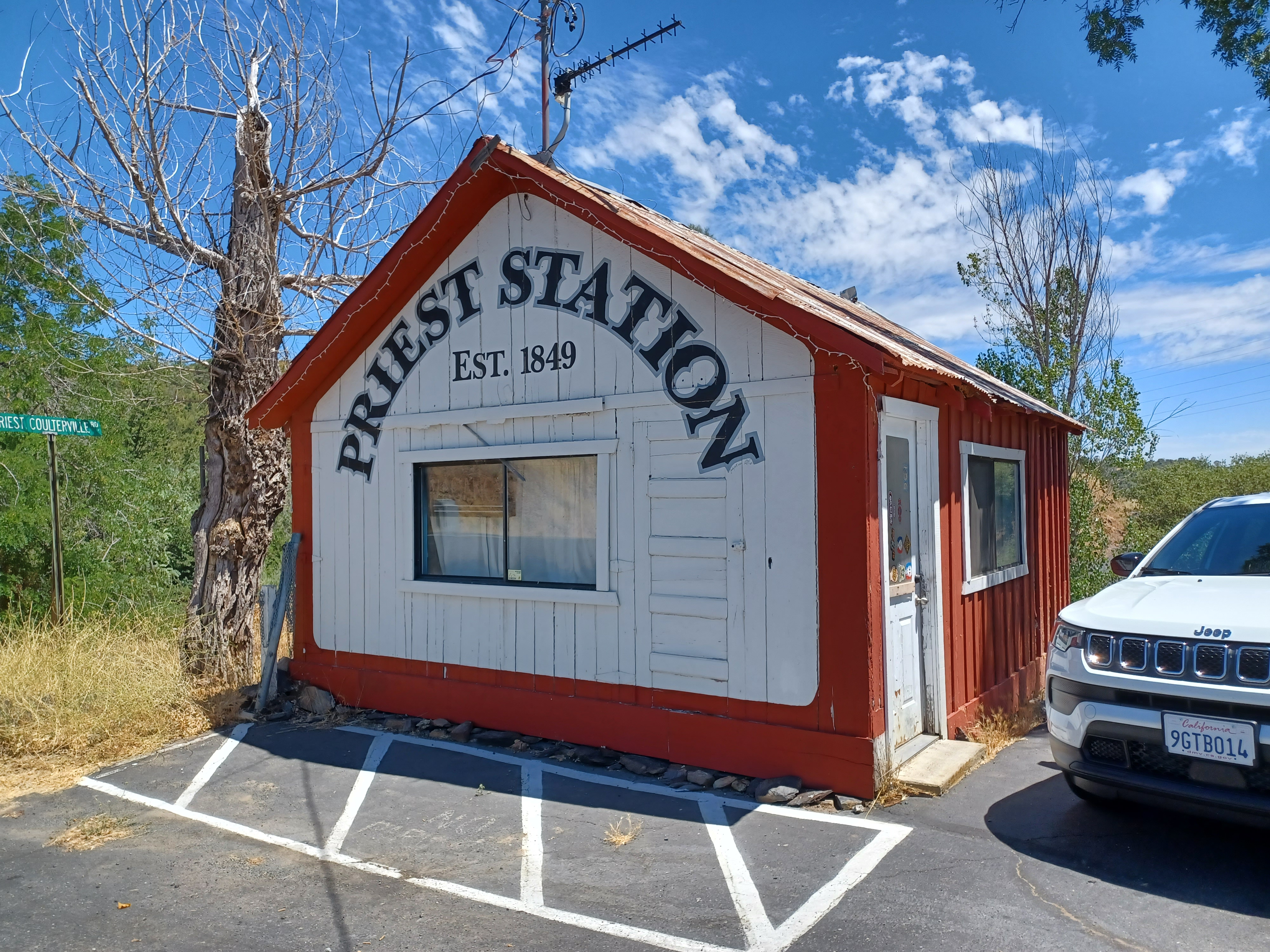

Priest, also known as Priest Station or Priest's Station, is an unincorporated locality 1 mile (1.6 km) southwest of Big Oak Flat in Tuolumne County, California, United States. It is the eastern terminus of the New Priest Grade and the Old Priest Grade.

The site was established as a stagecoach stop and hotel in 1849; the hotel did good business until it was destroyed in a wildfire in 1926. A motel was later built on the site, replaced by a store and cafe in 2007.
