= Mono Mills Junction, California =

Mono Mills Junction
- Location
- Nickname: Benton Junction
- Location in California
- Coordinates: 37.8869°N 119.0905°W
- Country: United States
- State: California
- County: Mono County
- Elevation: 6,883 ft (2,098 m)

Mono Mills Junction (may sometimes be referred to as Benton Junction) is a location within the Mono Basin in central Mono County where the Mono Mills Road California State Route 120, proceeds eastward from U.S. Route 395. Route 120 accesses the Mono Lake Tufa State Reserve, including Navy Beach and South Tufa along the shores of Mono Lake, and leads through Mono Mills to Benton where it reaches the U.S. Route 6.

This junction is the site of the "Grave of the Unknown Prospector", a historical monument erected by the E Clampus Vitus. This marker is not listed in the ECV's Bodie Chapter registry, although it surely does exist. It is local knowledge that this grave was attended with flowers and shoes over many years as a memorial, but no individual is actually buried here.
