= James E. Roberts =

American engineer (1930–2006)

James E. Roberts (November 30, 1930 – July 6, 2006) was a noted American civil engineer. He was recognized with industry and government awards for his leadership in bridge engineering, especially in the area of seismic retrofit. He was the state bridge engineer at Caltrans during the Loma Prieta earthquake and Northridge earthquake. His public service career lasted more than 50 years in the US Army, US Army Reserves and Caltrans. Roberts career spanned over 50 years and covered some of the most active years for engineering experienced in California from the design and construction heyday of the 1950s and 1960s to his leadership during the reconstruction efforts and seismic retrofitting programs created after two significant California earthquakes the 1989 Loma Prieta earthquake and the 1994 Northridge earthquake.

== Education ==
Roberts was the son of a carpenter who made his living working in the oil industry of the San Francisco Bay area as a contractor. Roberts developed an early interest in construction through working with his father and determined early on that his career choice would be Civil Engineering. He obtained his engineering degree at the University of California at Berkeley in 1953.

== US Army and Reserves ==
Upon graduation from UC Berkeley he started his employment with the California Division of Highways and worked in the area of bridge construction until leaving to fulfill his military commitment with a tour of duty in Korea. He retired as a colonel in the US Army Reserves. Roberts served as a Civil Engineering officer during this tour, returning to the Division of Highways and bridge construction as the federal Interstate highway program began.

== Caltrans ==
Roberts worked in California’s Southern Central valley in Bakersfield. He spent several years commuting in the evening to attend courses toward the completion of his master's degree in Civil Engineering at the University of Southern California completing his degree with research work in the area of long term deflections of concrete bridge decks. Roberts sought and obtained more responsible assignment in the California bridge department’s design office where he worked for several years as a bridge designer. His strengths on the design floor were complemented by his experience in construction and he soon was offered an opportunity to lead a design section where he sought projects that offered opportunities to innovate. The Tuolumne River Bridge, which would ultimately be renamed after him, was one of the many bridges designed by his design section. Roberts final posting was Chief Engineer for the California Department of Transportation.

He is remembered by colleagues for his contributions toward seismic design of concrete structures. Highlights of his career include his work as lead on the planning and design of the downtown area of Sacramento for its light rail project, which was designed at Roberts’ insistence by state staff to demonstrate the flexibility that state highway engineers could have.

== Professional Associations and Honors ==
Roberts was a member of the American Society of Civil Engineers, the Structural Engineers Association of California and served one year (1972) as State President of the Professional Engineers in California Government, the bargaining unit which represents Professional engineers, land surveyors and related classes who are civil servants for the state of California. He was an Honorary member of the American Concrete Institute among many other memberships.

In 2007, the Members of the California State Legislature passed the bill to rename the Tuolumne River Bridge as the James E. Roberts Bridge.

He received the Roebling Medal by the ESWP Engineers Society of Western Pennsylvania for Lifetime Achievement in Bridge Engineering.

== Selected References ==
1. Dokken Richard A., Salveson Matthew, James E. Roberts – More than an Engineer’s Engineer. ASCE Structure Magazine, Feb 2009, pp 48–49

2. Alden, Don, et al. Oral History James E Roberts, California Department of Transportation Caltrans, pp

3. Kempton, Will, Land Richard, et al. James E. Roberts Memorial, California Department of Transportation, [Caltrans], DVD, 59 minutes

4. Roberts, James E., 50-Years as bridge engineer History James E Roberts, California Department of Transportation [Caltrans], DVD, March 14, 2001

5. Wilson, Bill, Nothing Earth-Shattering –Roebling Medal, Roads & Bridges Magazine, August 2001, www.ROADSBRIDGES.com pp 24–25
