= California State Route 120 =

Highway in California

State Route 120
- SR 120 highlighted in red; the gap represents the unofficial segment through Yosemite National Park

Route information
- Maintained by Caltrans
- Length: 152.562 mi (245.525 km) (Does not include the portion in Yosemite)
- Existed: 1934–present
- Tourist routes: Tioga Road/Big Oak Flat Road; Lee Vining Canyon Scenic Byway
- Restrictions: Segments through Tioga Pass, and between Mono Lake and Benton, closed in winter

Major junctions
- West end: I-5 in Lathrop
- SR 99 in Manteca; SR 108 from Oakdale to Yosemite Junction; SR 49 from Chinese Camp to Moccasin; Big Oak Flat Road to SR 41 / SR 140 in Yosemite National Park; US 395 from Lee Vining to Mono Mills Junction
- East end: US 6 at Benton

Location
- Country: United States
- State: California
- Counties: San Joaquin, Stanislaus, Tuolumne, Mono

Highway system
- State highways in California; Interstate; US; State; Scenic; History; Pre‑1964; Unconstructed; Deleted; Freeways
← SR 119	→ SR 121

State Route 120 (SR 120) is a state highway in the central part of California that connects the San Joaquin Valley with the Sierra Nevada, Yosemite National Park, and the Mono Lake area. It runs between Interstate 5 (I-5) in Lathrop and U.S. Route 6 (US 6) in Benton, traversing four counties over a distance of approximately 153 miles (246 km). The route rises from near sea level in the Central Valley to 9,945 feet (3,031 m) at Tioga Pass, the highest highway pass in the state highway system. While SR 120 is signed as a continuous route through Yosemite, the portion inside the park is federally maintained and is not included in the state route logs. The segment through Tioga Pass and the stretch between Mono Lake and Benton are subject to annual winter closure, typically from November through late May.

The route has origins in the Gold Rush-era Big Oak Flat Road, a wagon road completed to Yosemite Valley in 1874. Through Yosemite, SR 120 follows Tioga Road, designated as both a National Scenic Byway and a National Forest Scenic Byway.

== Route description ==
Route 120 is defined in section 420 of the California Streets and Highways Code. The definition omits the federally maintained segment through Yosemite National Park, as well as the concurrency with US 395 instead of duplicating that segment in the other route's definition in the code:

Route 120 is from:
(a) Route 5 near Mossdale to the west boundary of Yosemite National Park via the vicinity of Manteca and Oakdale, and via Big Oak Flat and Buck Meadows.
(b) The east boundary of Yosemite National Park to Route 395 near Mono Lake.
(c) Route 395 near Mono Lake to Route 6 near Benton Station.

SR 120 is part of the California Freeway and Expressway System. Both the western portion and the eastern portion west of US 395 are part of the National Highway System (NHS), a network of highways that are considered essential to the country's economy, defense, and mobility by the Federal Highway Administration. SR 120 is eligible to be included in the State Scenic Highway System but is not officially designated as a scenic highway by Caltrans.

=== San Joaquin Valley ===
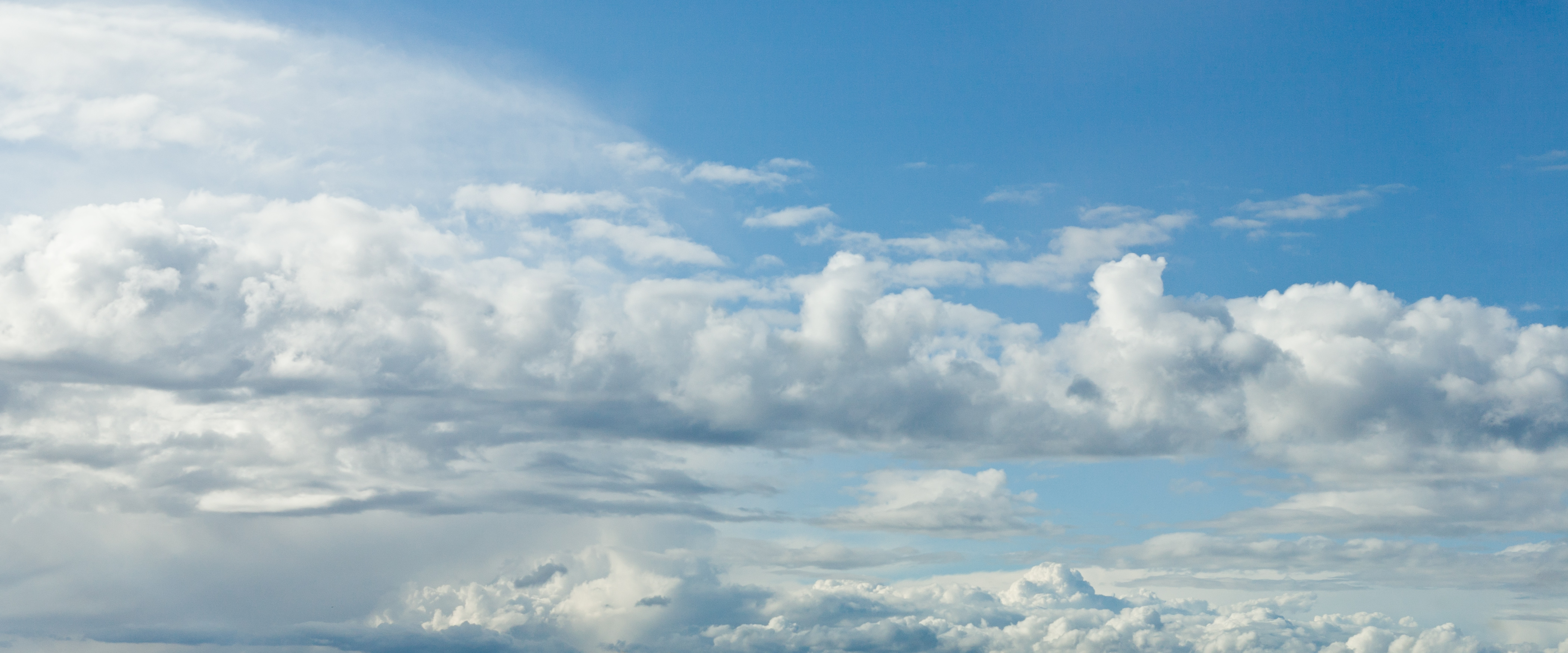
SR 120 near Oakdale in Stanislaus County

SR 120 begins at an interchange with I-5 near the Mossdale area of Lathrop, where it continues the alignment of Interstate 205 eastward as a four-lane freeway. The freeway passes through the southern part of Manteca, serving several interchanges including the diverging diamond interchange at Union Road, the first of its kind constructed in California, which opened on November 25, 2020. The freeway section, once known locally as "Blood Alley" for its high rate of head-on collisions on the original alternating-lane configuration, was subsequently improved with center median barriers.

In eastern Manteca, SR 120 has a brief overlap with SR 99 before the freeway ends and the route continues east as a conventional two-lane highway. The road crosses the flat agricultural landscape of the San Joaquin Valley, passing through the small city of Escalon and continuing into Stanislaus County. At Oakdale, the route begins a concurrency with SR 108, which continues together as the highway leaves the valley floor and enters the Sierra Nevada foothills.

=== Sierra foothills ===
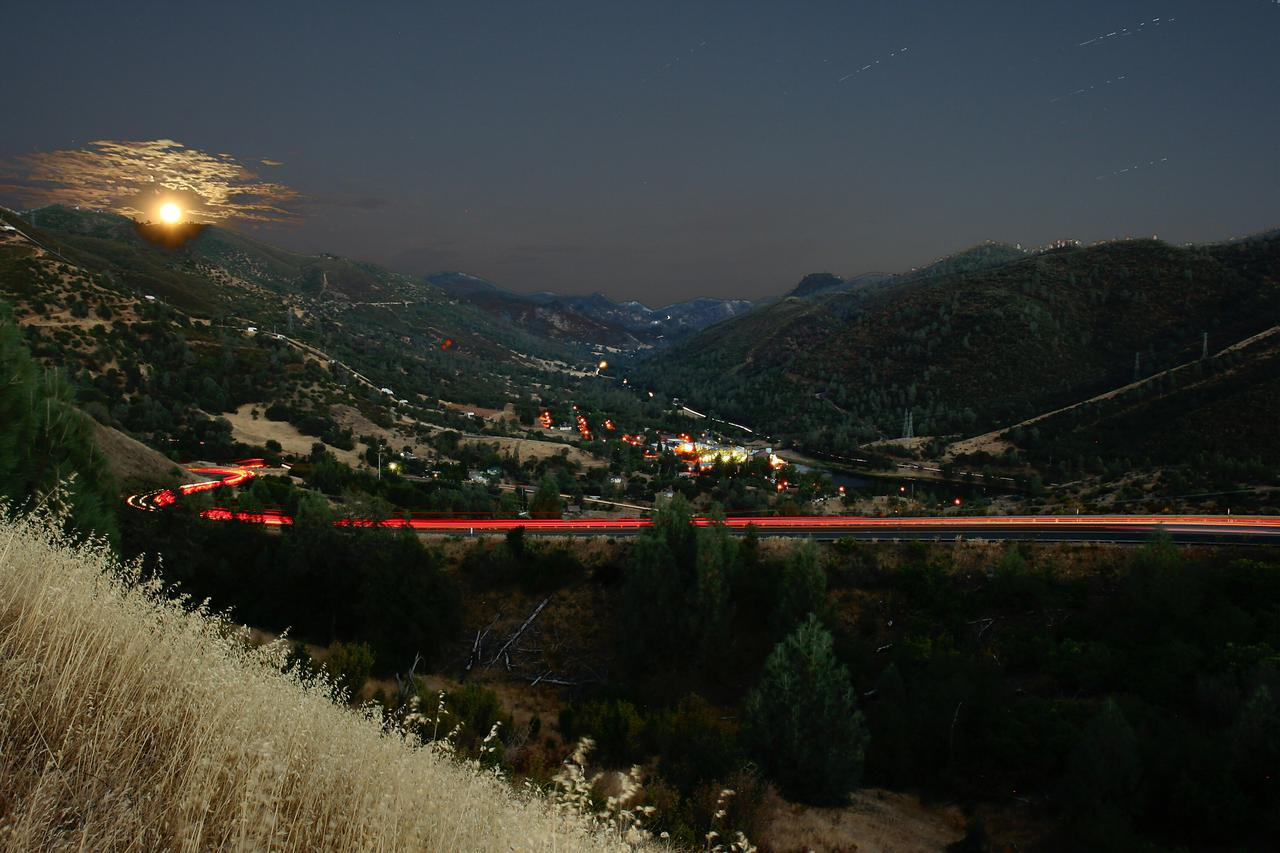
Night view looking west from New Priest Grade over Moccasin

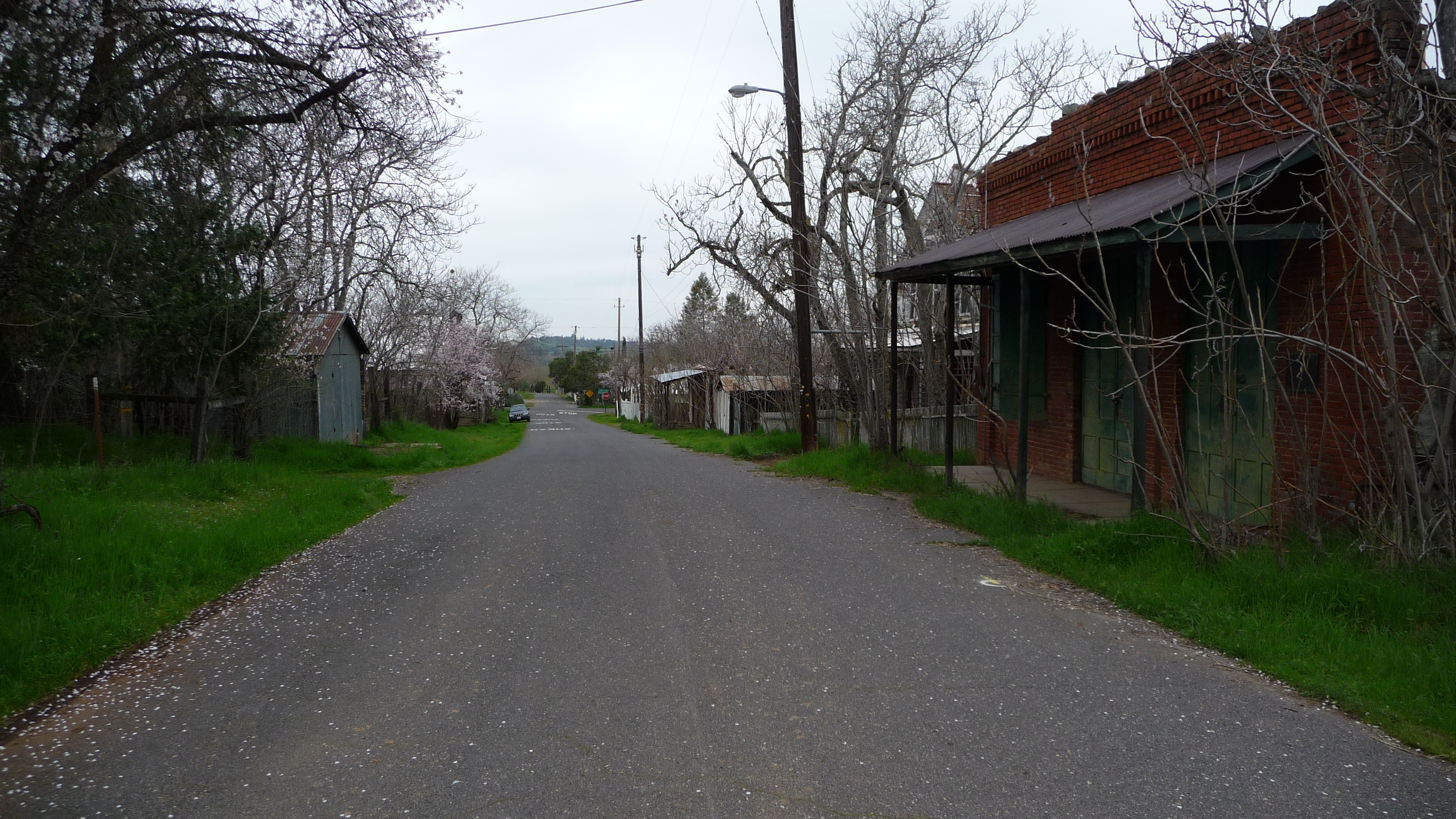
Main Street in Chinese Camp, a Gold Rush settlement at the SR 120/SR 49 junction

East of Oakdale, the highway enters Tuolumne County and the landscape transitions from valley grasslands to oak-studded foothills. SR 108 splits off to the east toward Sonora at Yosemite Junction, while SR 120 turns southeast toward Chinese Camp, a Gold Rush settlement designated as California Historical Landmark No. 423. At Chinese Camp, the route begins a concurrency with SR 49, the historic Mother Lode highway.

The combined SR 120/SR 49 crosses the Tuolumne River on the James E. Roberts Bridge, a 1,400-foot (430 m) structure spanning Don Pedro Reservoir. The bridge was built in 1970 to accommodate the new highway alignment created by the expansion of New Don Pedro Dam. SR 49 separates near Moccasin, and SR 120 begins its climb into the mountains via Priest Grade. The New Priest Grade, opened in 1915, features over one hundred curves with a sustained 4-percent gradient, built as an alternative to the much steeper Old Priest Grade, which has a 17-percent grade. Both grades are paved, but trailers and recreational vehicles are prohibited from Old Priest Grade, which has a 7,500 pounds (3,400 kg) weight limit.

Above Priest Grade, SR 120 passes through Groveland and the adjacent community of Big Oak Flat, both founded during the Gold Rush in 1849. These communities serve as the primary western gateway to Yosemite National Park along the SR 120 corridor. Continuing east, the route passes through Buck Meadows, the last community with traveler services before the park entrance, at an elevation of approximately 2,900 feet (880 m). A short distance beyond Buck Meadows, SR 120 reaches the western boundary of Yosemite National Park, where state maintenance ends and the road comes under federal jurisdiction.

=== Yosemite National Park ===
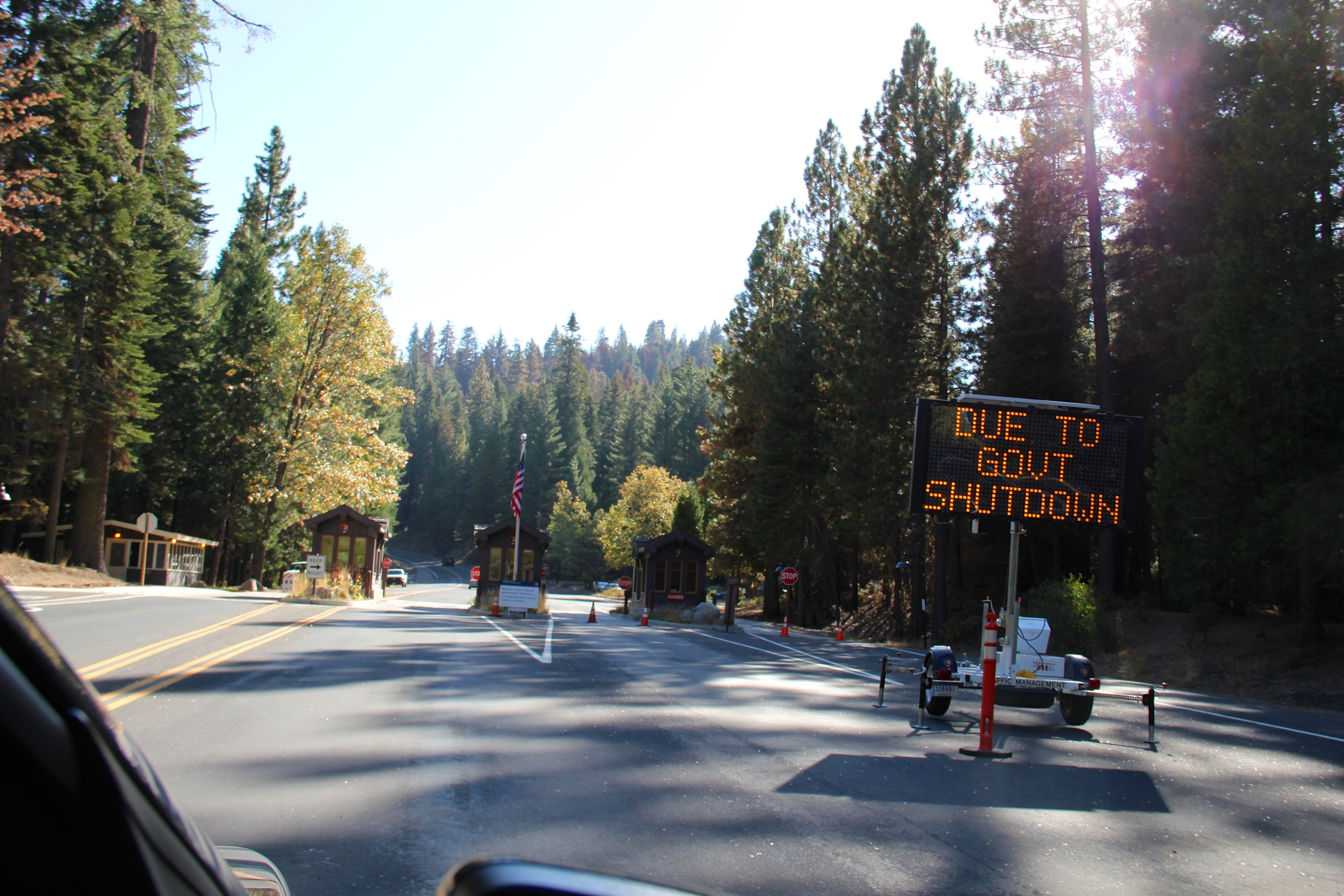
Big Oak Flat Entrance Station at the western park boundary

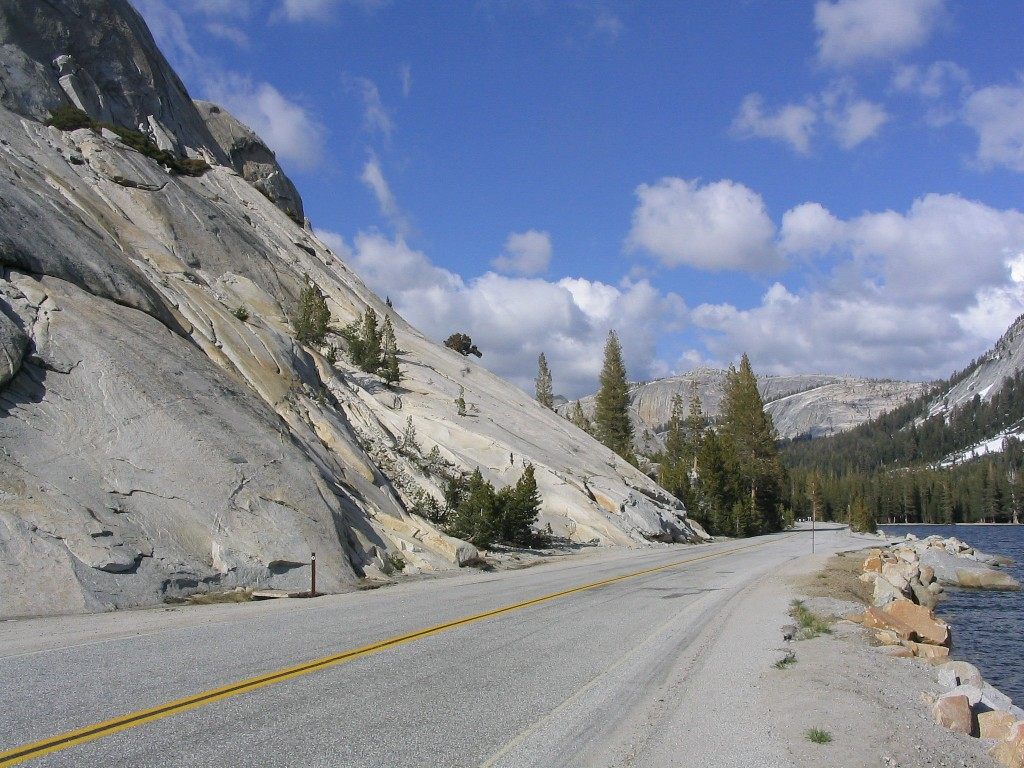
SR 120 as Tioga Road near Tenaya Lake in Yosemite National Park

Inside Yosemite National Park, state routes are federally maintained and are not included in the state route logs, although the park signs the routes at intersections. Visitors entering through the Big Oak Flat Entrance Station must pay a park entrance fee or present a valid pass.

From the entrance station, the highway descends as Big Oak Flat Road toward Crane Flat, a junction at approximately 6,200 feet (1,900 m) elevation. At Crane Flat, Big Oak Flat Road turns southeast toward Yosemite Valley, while SR 120 continues east as Tioga Pass Road (commonly Tioga Road). Near Crane Flat, the road passes the Tuolumne Grove, one of three giant sequoia groves in the park.

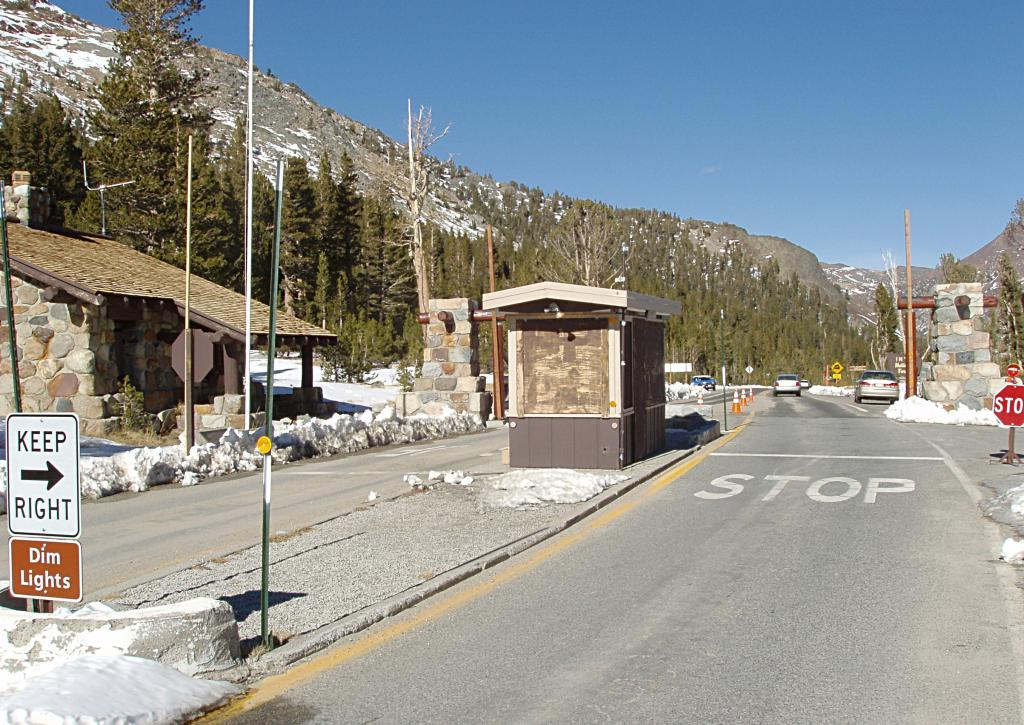
Tioga Pass Entrance Station at the eastern park boundary

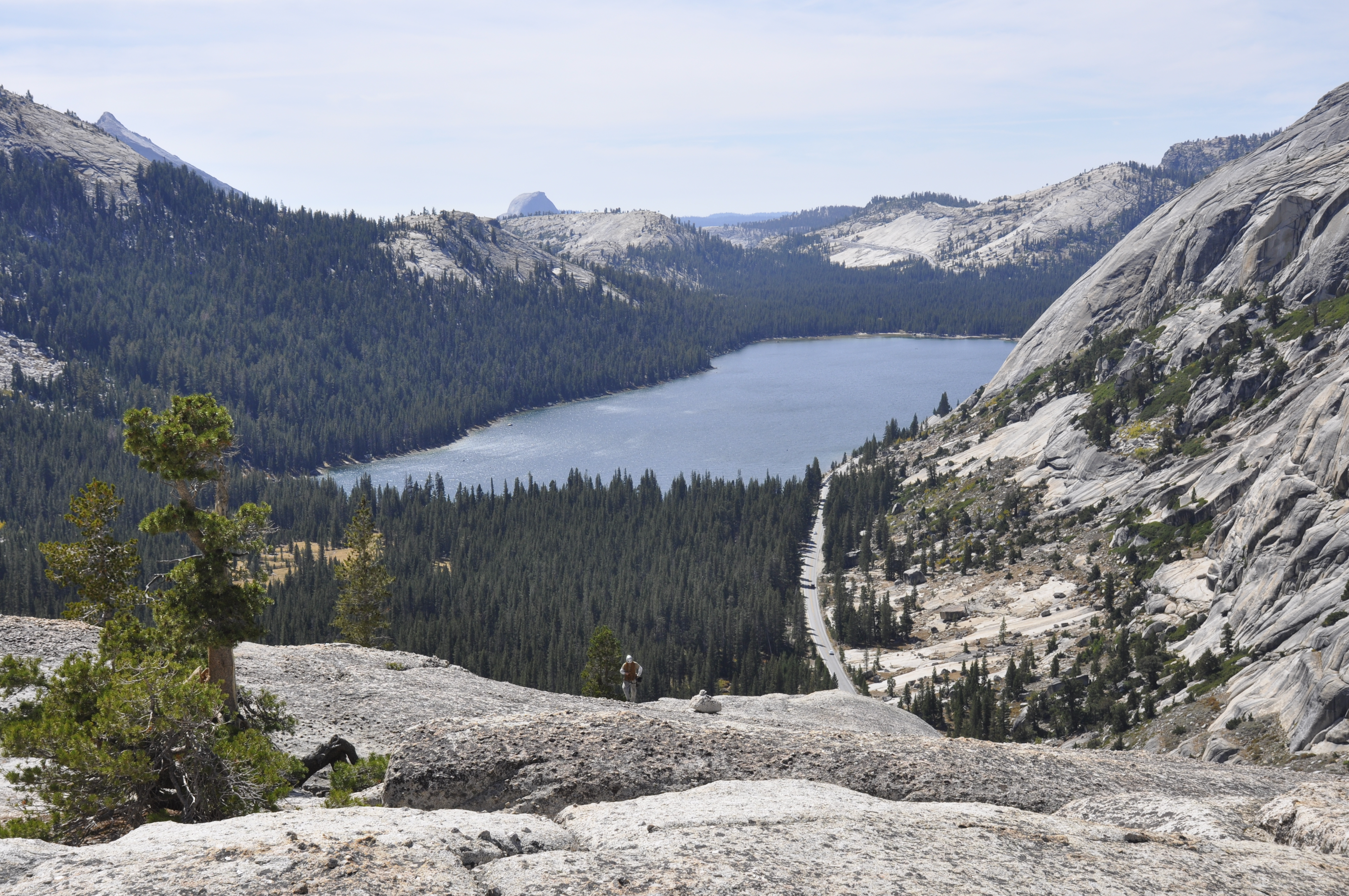
Tioga Road and Tenaya Lake viewed from Pywiack Dome

Tioga Road is a winding two-lane mountain road that traverses the park's subalpine high country. The road passes through forests of lodgepole pine and red fir, ascending gradually past Siesta Lake, White Wolf, and Yosemite Creek to Olmsted Point, a scenic overlook at 8,300 feet (2,500 m) with views of Tenaya Lake and the granite domes of the park's backcountry. The road then descends to Tenaya Lake before climbing again to Tuolumne Meadows, the largest subalpine meadow in the Sierra Nevada, at an elevation of approximately 8,600 feet (2,600 m).

East of Tuolumne Meadows, Tioga Road ascends through Dana Meadows to Tioga Pass, at 9,945 feet (3,031 m) the highest highway pass in both the Sierra Nevada and the California state highway system. Tioga Pass marks the park's eastern boundary, where the Tioga Pass Entrance Station collects fees from visitors entering from the east. A winter closure gate is located near the entrance station; the road is typically closed from around November through late May, though exact dates vary by snowfall conditions.

Tioga Road/Big Oak Flat Road is officially designated as both a National Scenic Byway and a National Forest Scenic Byway. The Tioga Pass Road was designated as a California Historic Civil Engineering Landmark by the American Society of Civil Engineers in 2002.

=== Eastern Sierra and Mono Basin ===
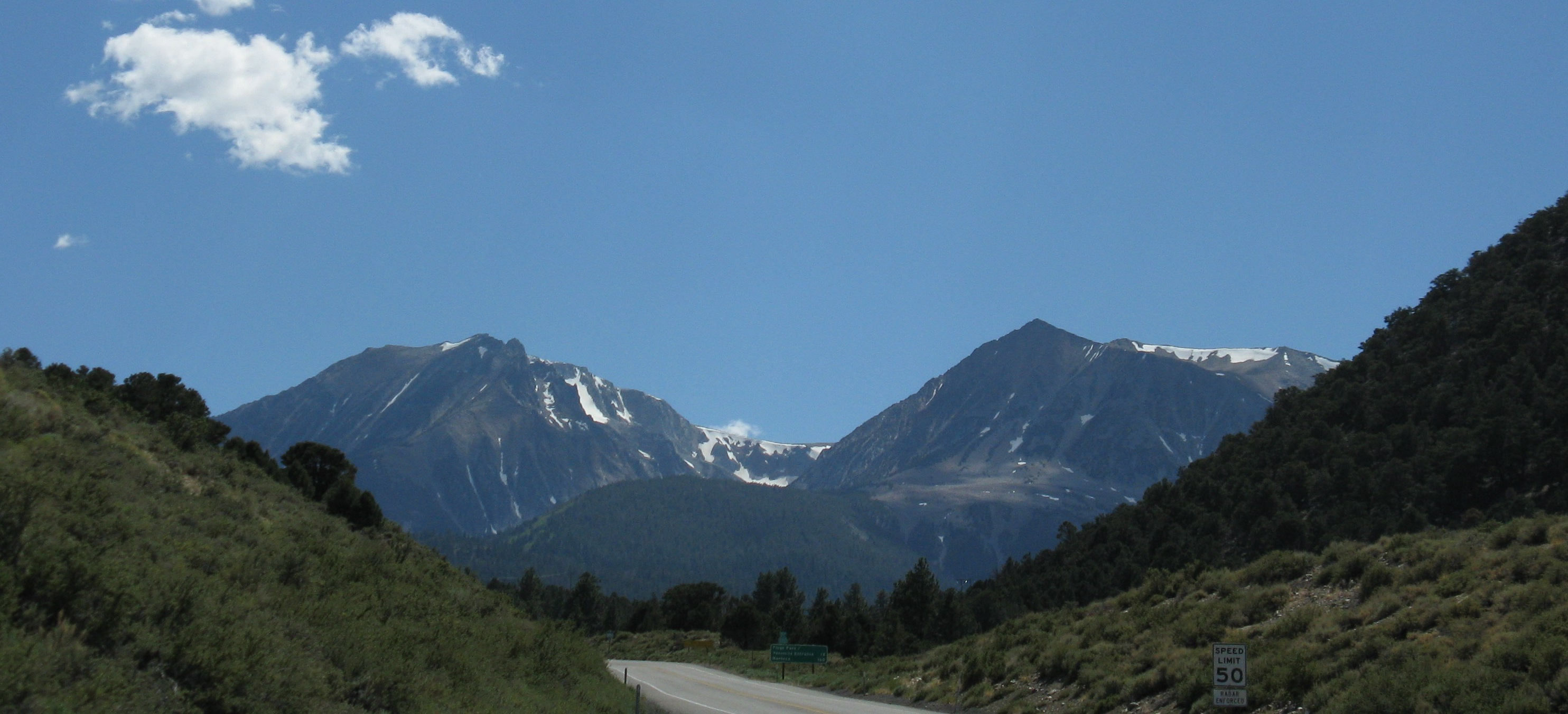
Tioga Road near Lee Vining, descending the eastern Sierra escarpment

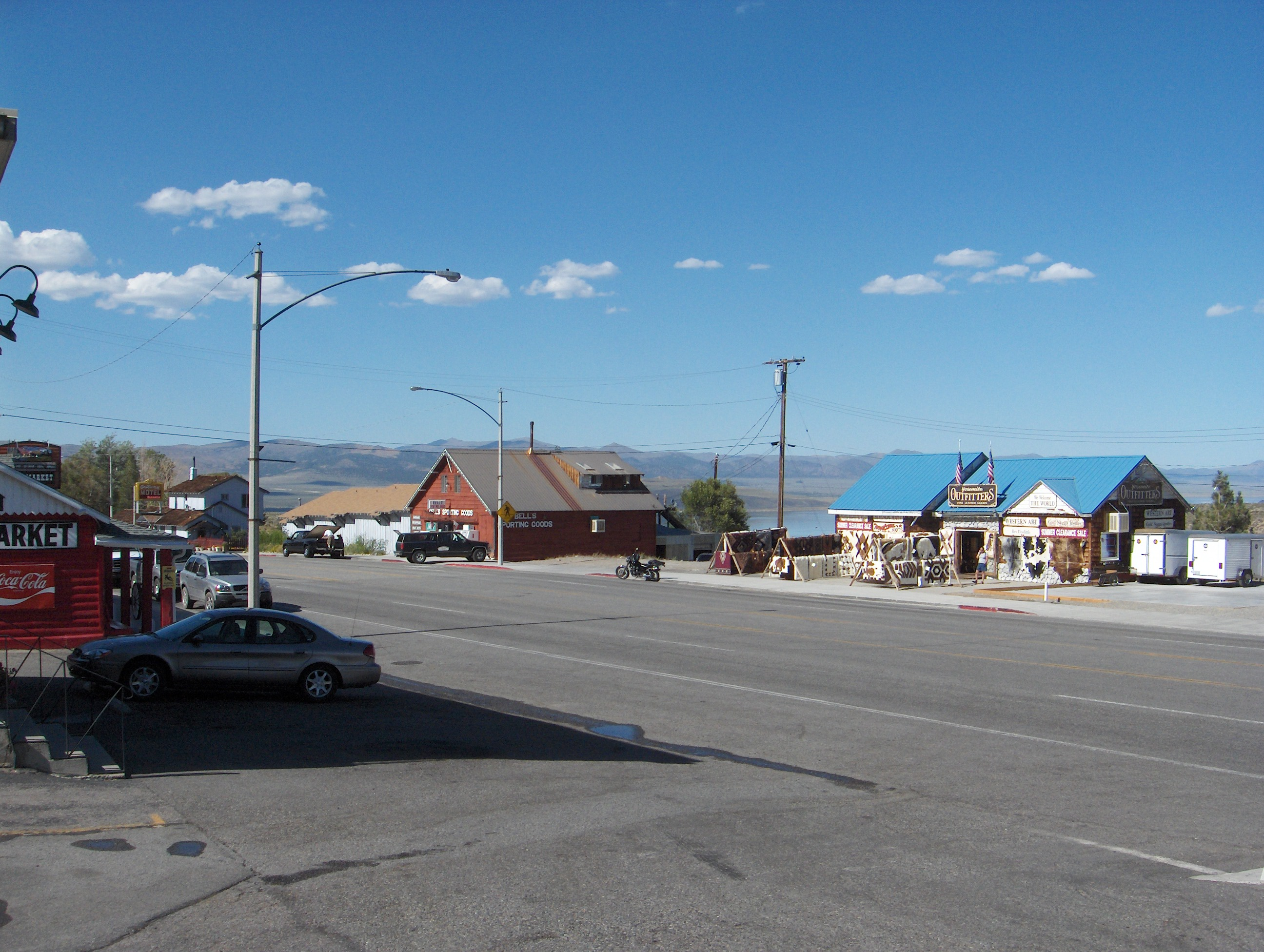
US 395 through Lee Vining, at the SR 120 junction

East of Tioga Pass, the highway begins a dramatic descent through Lee Vining Canyon, dropping more than 3,000 feet (910 m) over approximately 12 miles (19 km) as it descends the steep eastern escarpment of the Sierra Nevada. This segment through Lee Vining Canyon is designated as the Lee Vining Canyon Scenic Byway, a National Forest Scenic Byway administered by the Inyo National Forest.

The canyon road ends at the community of Lee Vining, on the southwestern shore of Mono Lake, where SR 120 meets US 395. The two routes share a concurrency southward for approximately 5 miles (8.0 km) to Mono Mills Junction, where SR 120 separates and continues east as Mono Mills Road. This segment skirts the southern end of Mono Lake, providing access to the Mono Lake South Tufa area and the historical site of Mono Mills. The BLM Granite Mountain Wilderness lies immediately north of the route in this area.

The highway crests Sagehen Summit before descending to its eastern terminus at a junction with US 6 in Benton. Both the Tioga Pass segment and the stretch between Mono Lake and Benton are subject to winter closure. The Tioga Road usually opens by the Memorial Day weekend at the end of May and typically closes for the winter sometime in November.

== History ==
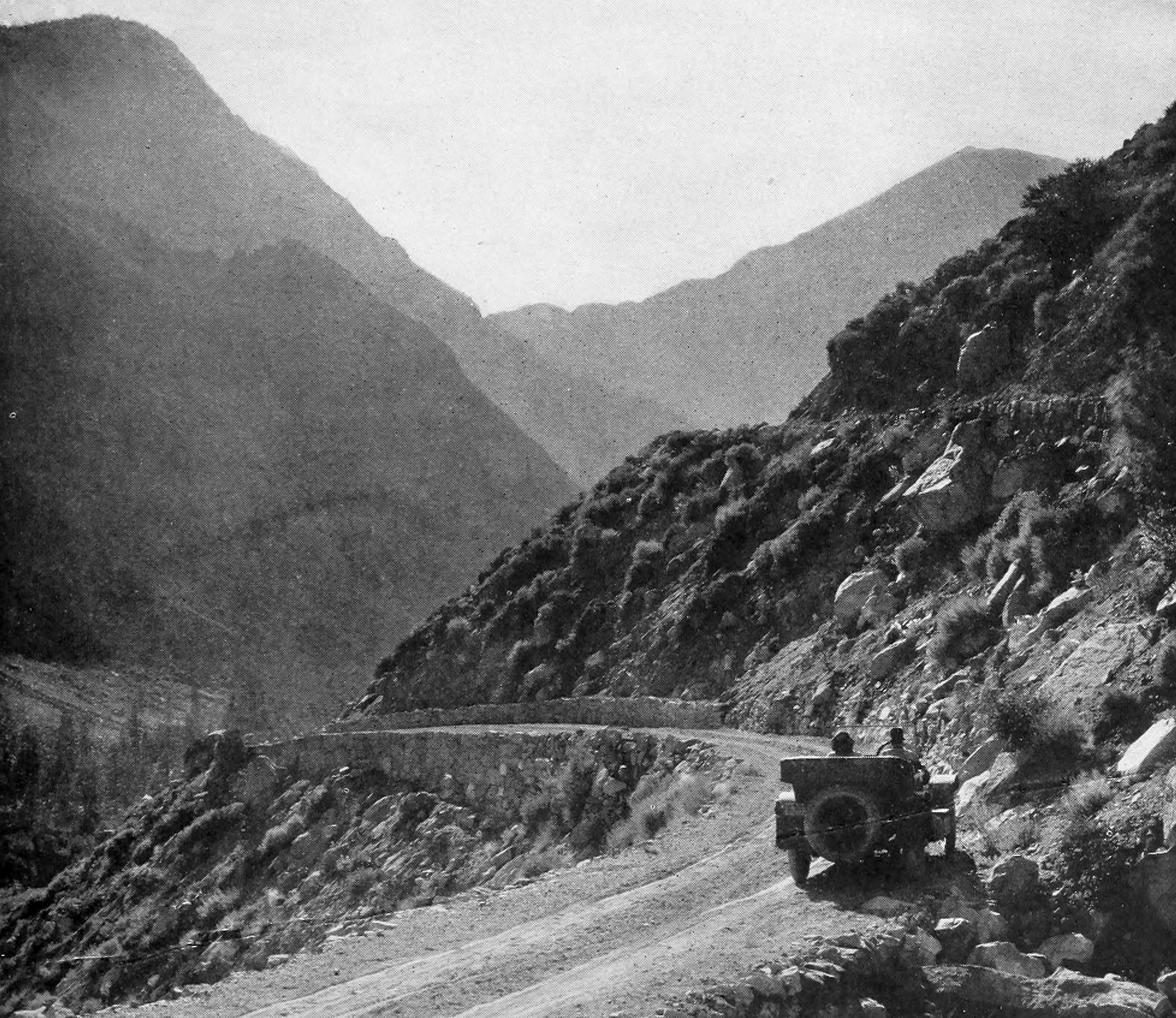
Tioga Road, 1921

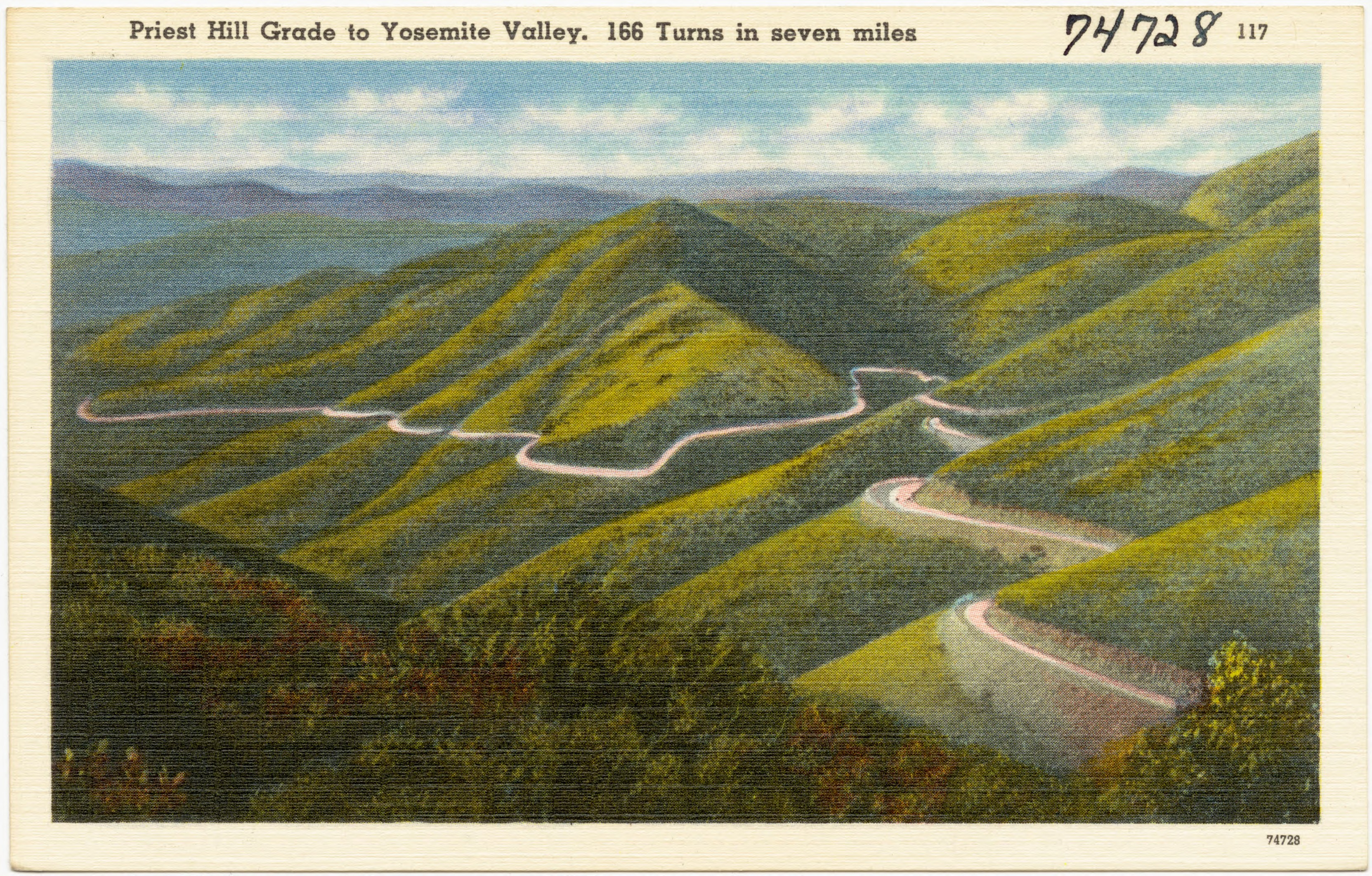
Historic postcard of Priest Grade, captioned "166 Turns in seven miles"

=== Origins and early roads ===
The origins of SR 120 lie in the Gold Rush era. The Big Oak Flat Road began as a pack trail from Stockton that became popular with prospectors around 1849, named after the mining settlement of Big Oak Flat through which it passed. By 1874, it had been improved to a wagon road extending to Yosemite Valley, serving as a major tourism and freight route.

The Tioga Road was built in 1883 as a mining road to reach the Sheepherder and Tioga silver mines east of Tioga Pass. It became a private toll road, charging $2 per horse and rider. In 1915, Stephen Mather, who would become the first director of the National Park Service, purchased the road for $15,000 using his own funds and donations from the Sierra Club and the Modesto Chamber of Commerce, enabling public access through the park's high country.

=== Legislative history ===
In 1921, the California State Assembly authorized San Joaquin County to transfer the county road connecting Manteca with then-Route 5 (now I-5) at Mossdale to the state. It was numbered Route 66, as was a 1933 extension from Manteca east to Route 13 in Oakdale. Also in 1933, Route 40 was extended east from Mono Lake to Route 76 (US 6) at Benton. The route from Manteca to Benton was marked as Sign Route 120 in 1934, and was soon extended west to Mossdale, replacing what had been part of U.S. Route 99W.

=== New Tioga Road construction, 1958–1961 ===
In 1956, the National Park Service developed plans to relocate the Big Oak Flat Road from Crane Flat to the park's eastern boundary, and reconstruct the unimproved central section of the Tioga Road. NPS management wanted to open the High Sierra section of the park to increased numbers of visitors and planned new facilities at Tuolumne Meadows. This brought fierce opposition from the Sierra Club, led by photographer Ansel Adams. Adams and his supporters opposed the blasting of a granite dome southwest of Tenaya Lake and the routing of the highway along the western shore of the lake. Internally, many Sierra Club members supported the project. The controversy created a serious rift in the relationship between the environmental organization and the National Park Service. The government ultimately proceeded with the project as originally planned, with only minor modifications.

The present Big Oak Flat Road was constructed by the Bureau of Public Roads with Public Works Administration funding between 1935 and 1940.

=== Manteca Bypass and safety improvements ===
The Manteca Bypass section of SR 120 opened in spring 1980 as a "super two" facility with limited overpasses. The original alternating-lane configuration earned the highway the nickname "Blood Alley" due to frequent head-on collisions. Local advocacy led to the installation of center median barriers separating the directions of traffic, substantially reducing fatalities. The bypass was subsequently widened to a full four-lane divided freeway.

=== California's first diverging diamond interchange ===
On November 25, 2020, the first diverging diamond interchange in the state of California opened to traffic at the interchange with Union Road (exit 4) in Manteca.

== Major intersections ==
Except where prefixed with a letter, postmiles were measured on the road as it was in 1964, based on the alignment that existed at the time, and do not necessarily reflect current mileage. Postmile prefixes include: R reflecting a realignment in the route since then, M indicating a second realignment, L referring to an overlap due to a correction or change, and T indicating postmiles classified as temporary. Segments that remain unconstructed or have been relinquished to local control may be omitted. The numbers reset at county lines; the start and end postmiles in each county are given in the county column.

County	Location	Postmile	Exit	Destinations	Notes
San Joaquin; SJ R0.49-21.18	Lathrop	R0.49	1	I-5 – San Francisco, Los Angeles, Stockton, Sacramento	Westbound exit and eastbound entrance; signed as exits 1A (south) and 1B (north); west end of SR 120; former US 50 west; I-5 exit 461
San Joaquin; SJ R0.49-21.18	Manteca	R1.33	1C	Yosemite Avenue	Signed as exit 1 eastbound
San Joaquin; SJ R0.49-21.18	Manteca	R2.30	2	McKinley Avenue	
San Joaquin; SJ R0.49-21.18	Manteca	R3.32	3	Airport Way (CR J3) – Sharpe Depot	
San Joaquin; SJ R0.49-21.18	Manteca	R4.31	4	Union Road	Diverging diamond interchange: first one constructed in California and opened to traffic on November 25, 2020
San Joaquin; SJ R0.49-21.18	Manteca	R5.31	5	South Main Street	
San Joaquin; SJ R0.49-21.18	Manteca	T6.87 5.82 (Note: Indicates that the postmile represents the distance along SR 99 rather than SR 120.)	6	SR 99 south – Modesto, Fresno, Los Angeles	West end of SR 99 overlap; SR 99 exit 241
San Joaquin; SJ R0.49-21.18	Manteca	6.65 6.20	East end of freeway on SR 99		
San Joaquin; SJ R0.49-21.18	Manteca	6.65 6.20		SR 99 north / Yosemite Avenue – Sacramento, Central Manteca	Interchange; east end of SR 99 overlap; SR 99 exit 242
San Joaquin; SJ R0.49-21.18	Manteca	8.84		CR J5 (Jack Tone Road)	
San Joaquin; SJ R0.49-21.18		11.64		French Camp Road	
San Joaquin; SJ R0.49-21.18	Escalon			CR J6 / CR J7 north (Escalon-Bellota Road, McHenry Avenue) – Farmington, Modesto	West end of CR J7 overlap
San Joaquin; SJ R0.49-21.18	Escalon	R16.92		CR J7 south (Main Street) / Kern Street	East end of CR J7 overlap
Stanislaus; STA 0.00-T18.17		3.16		CR J9 north (Valley Home Road) – Valley Home	West end of CR J9 overlap
Stanislaus; STA 0.00-T18.17				CR J14 north (Twenty-Six Mile Road)	West end of CR J14 overlap
Stanislaus; STA 0.00-T18.17	Oakdale	5.12		SR 108 west (F Street) / CR J9 / CR J14 south (Yosemite Avenue) – Modesto	West end of SR 108 overlap; east end of CR J9 / CR J14 overlap
Tuolumne; TUO R0.00-R41.52		8.19		CR J59 (La Grange Road) – La Grange, Merced	Northern terminus of CR J59
Tuolumne; TUO R0.00-R41.52				CR E15 (O'Byrnes Ferry Road) – Copperopolis	Southern terminus of CR E15
Tuolumne; TUO R0.00-R41.52		12.08		SR 108 east – Sonora	East end of SR 108 overlap
Tuolumne; TUO R0.00-R41.52	Chinese Camp	15.52		SR 49 north – Sonora	West end of SR 49 overlap
Tuolumne; TUO R0.00-R41.52	Tuolumne River / Don Pedro Reservoir	R19.61	James E. Roberts Bridge		
Tuolumne; TUO R0.00-R41.52		R23.90		SR 49 south – Coulterville, Mariposa	East end of SR 49 overlap
Tuolumne; TUO R0.00-R41.52	Buck Meadows	R39.46		CR J132 (Smith Station Road, Greeley Hill Road) to SR 132 – Coulterville, Merced	Eastern terminus of CR J132
Tuolumne; TUO R0.00-R41.52	Yosemite National Park		East end of state maintenance at western park boundary		
Tuolumne; TUO R0.00-R41.52	Yosemite National Park		Big Oak Flat Entrance Station; park fee or pass required for entry		
Mariposa; MPA R41.52-43.75	Yosemite National Park			Big Oak Flat Road to SR 41 / SR 140 – Yosemite Valley	
Mariposa; MPA R41.52-43.75	Yosemite National Park		Tuolumne Grove (winter closure gate near the eastern end of the grove)		
Tuolumne; TUO 43.75-R56.15	Yosemite National Park		Tioga Pass Entrance Station (closed in winters); park fee or pass required for entry		
Tuolumne; TUO 43.75-R56.15	Yosemite National Park		West end of state maintenance at eastern park boundary		
Mono; MNO R0.00-58.99		R8.54	Westbound winter closure gate		
Mono; MNO R0.00-58.99	Lee Vining	R12.06 50.74 (Note: Indicates that the postmile represents the distance along US 395 rather than SR 120.)		US 395 north / Airport Road – Reno	West end of US 395 overlap
Mono; MNO R0.00-58.99	June Lake Loop North Junction	46.40		SR 158 south – June Lake	Northern terminus of SR 158
Mono; MNO R0.00-58.99	Mono Mills Junction	45.96 13.37		US 395 south – Bishop	East end of US 395 overlap
Mono; MNO R0.00-58.99		18.49	Eastbound winter closure gate		
Mono; MNO R0.00-58.99		39.05	Westbound winter closure gate		
Mono; MNO R0.00-58.99		51.86		Benton Crossing Road to US 395 – Owens River, Crowley Lake	
Mono; MNO R0.00-58.99	Benton	58.99		US 6 – Tonopah, Bishop	East end of SR 120
1.000 mi = 1.609 km; 1.000 km = 0.621 mi: Concurrency terminus; Tolled
