= Don Pedro Reservoir =

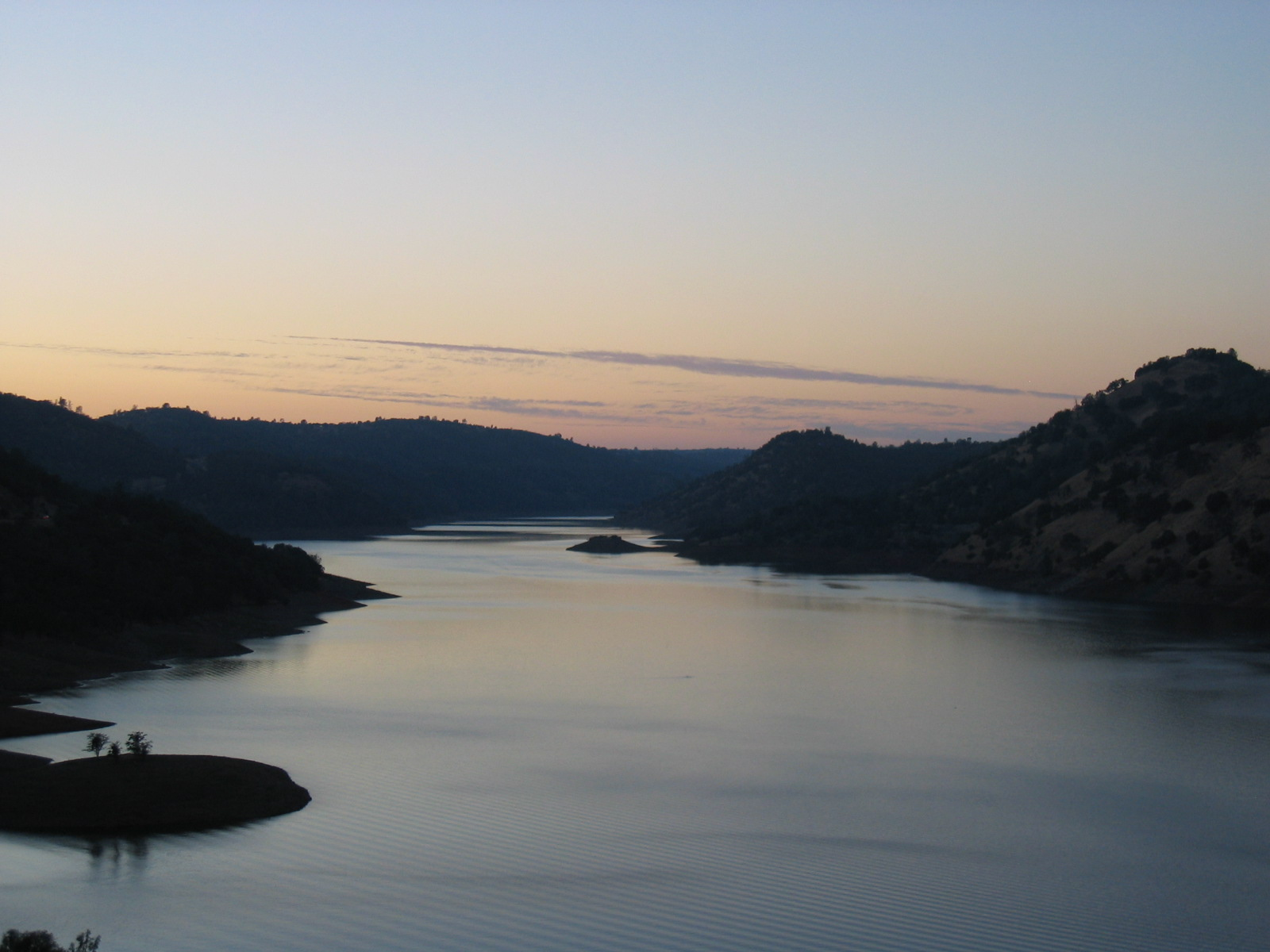
- Reservoir and Sierra Nevada foothills

- Location within California Location within the United States
- Location: Tuolumne County, California
- Coordinates: 37.7415°N 120.3735°W
- Type: Reservoir
- Primary inflows: Tuolumne River
- Primary outflows: Tuolumne River
- Catchment area: 1,500 sq mi (3,900 km^{2})
- Basin countries: United States
- Surface area: 13,000 acres (5,300 ha)
- Water volume: 2,030,000 acre⋅ft (2.50 km^{3})
- Shore length^{1}: 160 mi (260 km)
- Surface elevation: 245 m (804 ft)
- Islands: Laughlin Ridge
- References: U.S. Geological Survey Geographic Names Information System: Don Pedro Reservoir
- ^{1} Shore length is not a well-defined measure.

Don Pedro Reservoir, also known as Lake Don Pedro, is a reservoir formed by the construction of the New Don Pedro Dam across the Tuolumne River in Tuolumne County, California, United States.

The California Office of Environmental Health Hazard Assessment has issued a safety advisory for any fish caught in Don Pedro Reservoir due to elevated levels of mercury and PCBs.

== Geography ==
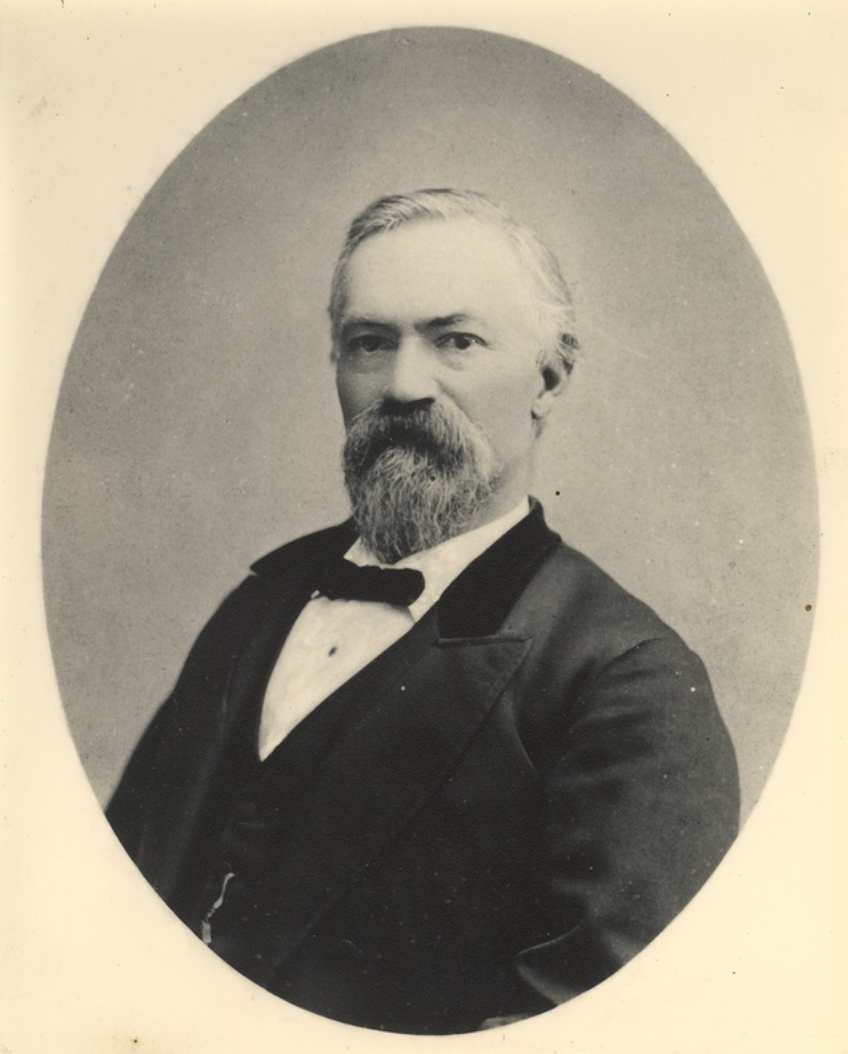
Lake Don Pedro is named after Don Pedro Sainsevain.

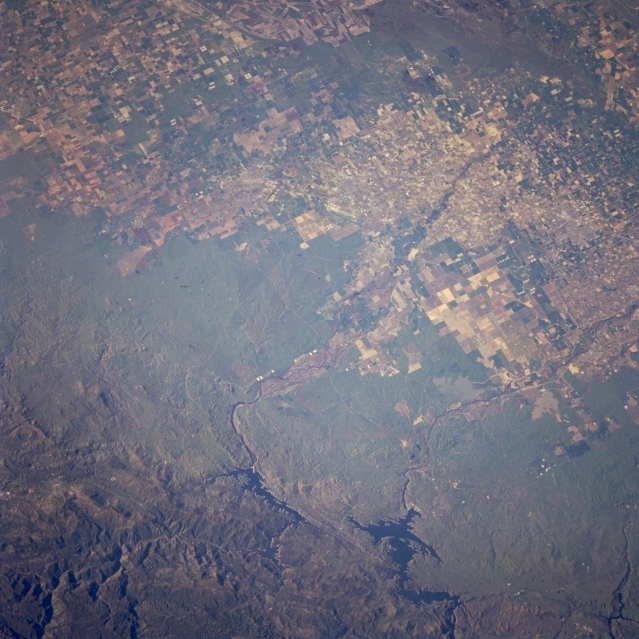
Overhead view of Don Pedro Reservoir (bottom/east center−right), upstream of irrigated fields in the San Joaquin Valley (top/west)

The reservoir is located in the foothills of the Sierra Nevada. Communities located nearby are Moccasin and La Grange. It is the sixth-largest reservoir in California.

Also referenced as Don Pedro Lake when the name is qualified, the first projects in 1923 are generally referred to as the Old Don Pedro Dam and reservoir, and the 1971 upgrades are the New Don Pedro Dam and reservoir. Don Pedro Reservoir takes its name from Don Pedros Bar. Pierre ("Don Pedro") Sainsevain was one of the first prospectors after the discovery of gold in 1848 that began the California Gold Rush.

When full, the reservoir's shoreline is approximately 160 mi (260 km). The reservoir submerges some 26 mi (42 km) of Tuolumne River bed, and has a surface area of about 13,000 acres (5,300 ha). The 2,030,000 acre⋅ft (2.50 km^{3}) stored here comes from a watershed of over 1,500 sq mi (3,900 km^{2}), and is used by the Modesto Irrigation District (MID) and the Turlock Irrigation District (TID) for the irrigation of several hundred square miles of San Joaquin Valley farm land.

Some of the water is treated by the MID and used as drinking water in Modesto. The two irrigation districts and the BLM control the land 15 feet (4.6 m) above the high lake level.

== Recreation ==
The Don Pedro Recreation Area is operated in and around the lake by the Don Pedro Lake Recreation Agency. There are drive-in and boat-in campgrounds, houseboat areas, fishing, water skiing, and mountain biking and hiking trails.

There are three public boat ramps on the shoreline, in the Blue Oaks Area, Moccasin Point Area, and Fleming Meadows Area.

== Hetch Hetchy project ==
While Don Pedro Reservoir is not part of the Hetch Hetchy Aqueduct, the project's tunnels cross under the upper end of the reservoir. The reservoir could easily be tied into the Hetch Hetchy Project in the future, and the efforts of the Restore Hetch Hetchy group to drain the reservoir in the Hetch Hetchy Valley depend largely on that possibility. The San Francisco Public Utilities Commission (SFPUC), of which Hetch Hetchy Water and Power is a division, provided about 45% of the funds for construction of the 1971 New Don Pedro Dam and so has the right to store 570,000 acre-feet (700,000,000 m^{3}) of water in the reservoir. Each year, San Francisco takes about 230,000 acre-feet (280,000,000 m^{3}). The rights of the MID and the TID are senior to those of SFPUC, however, so in dry years MID and TID can draw down the reservoir to meet their own needs before providing water to San Francisco's Hetch Hetchy Water and Power.

== See also ==
- List of dams and reservoirs in California
- List of largest reservoirs of California
- Tuolumne River topics
