= E45 =

E45 may refer to:

- European route E45, a road that goes between Norway and Italy, through Finland, Sweden, Denmark, Germany and Austria.
- E45 cream, a brand of skin care products currently marketed by Karo Pharma.
- The US Federal Aviation Administration airport code for Pine Mountain Lake Airport.
- E45 Bronstein (Byrne) variation, ECO code for a variation of the Nimzo-Indian Defence.
- Sanriku Expressway (between Rifu JCT and Taro-kita IC), Sanriku-kita Jūkan Road and Hachinohe-Kuji Expressway, route E45 in Japan.
