= Hotel Charlotte =

Hotel Charlotte may refer to:

- Hotel Charlotte (Groveland, California)
- Hotel Charlotte (Charlotte, North Carolina)
