= Q68 =

Q68 may refer to:

- Q68 (New York City bus)
- Al-Qalam, the 68th surah of the Quran
- French submarine Ampère
- Pine Mountain Lake Airport, in Tuolumne County, California, United States
