= Jacksonville, California =

Historical place in Tuolumne County, United States

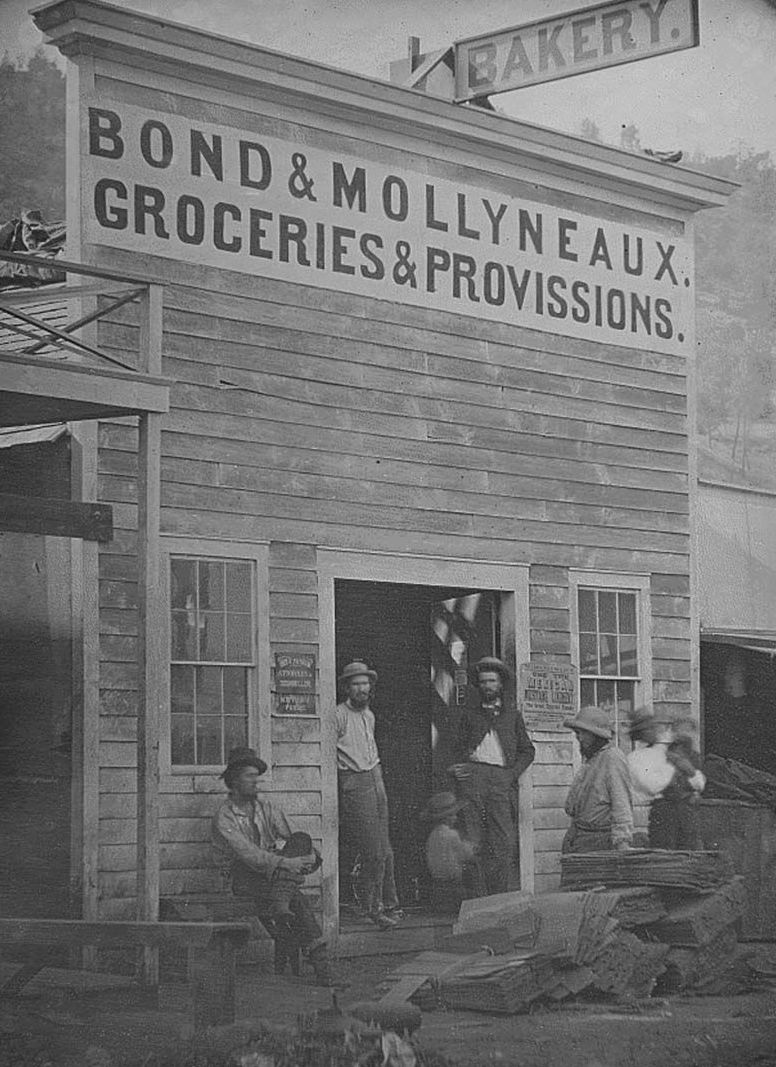
- Jacksonville, California in 1855

- Location within California Location within the United States
- 37.844°N 120.38218°W
- Location: CA Hwy 120, Chinese Camp, California.

History
- Built: 1849, 177 years ago

Site notes
- Architect: Julian Smart
- Architectural style: 49 Mining town

California Historical Landmark
- Designated: February 28, 1949
- Reference no.: 419

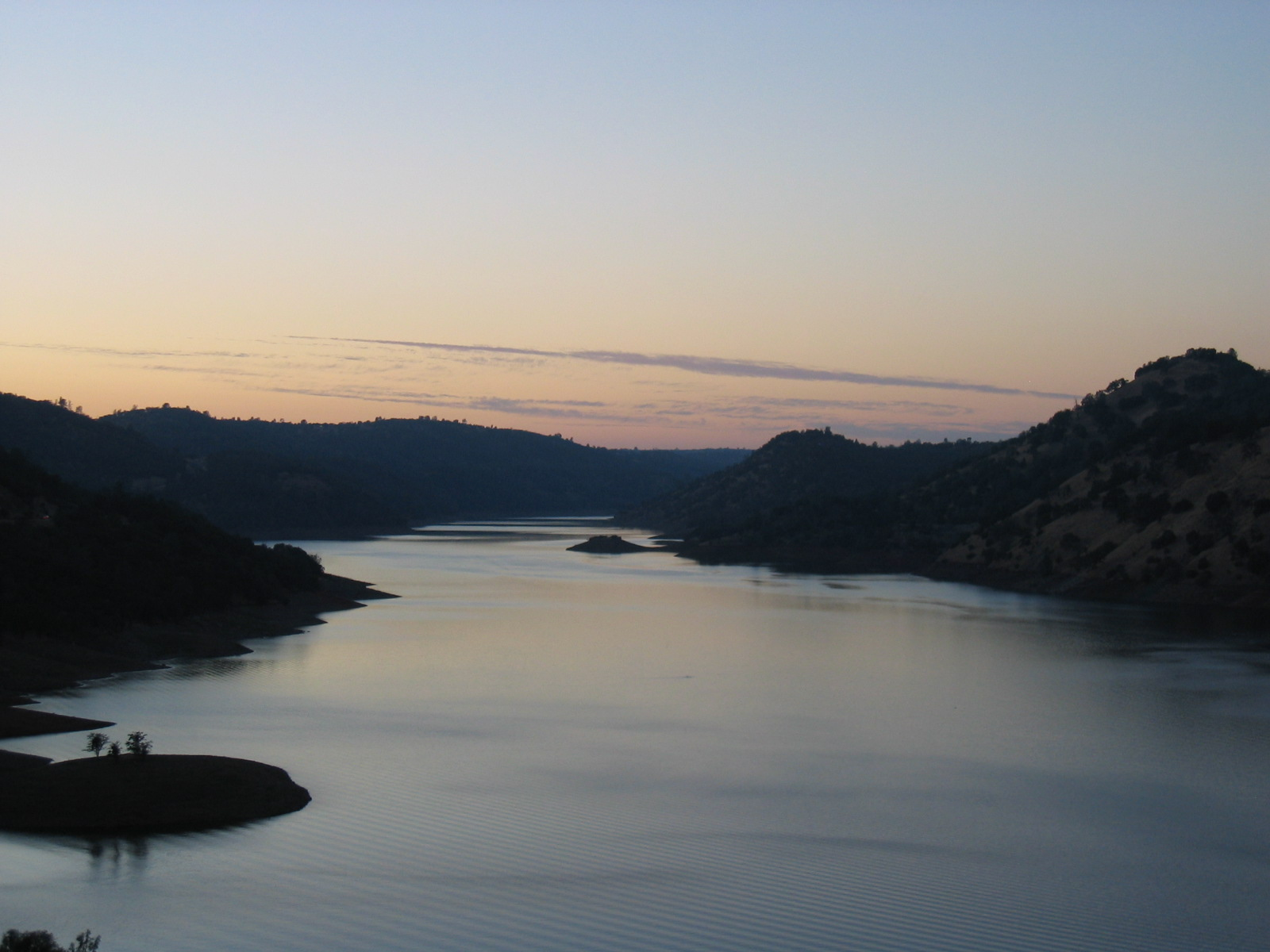
The city of Jacksonville is under the Don Pedro Reservoir

Jacksonville is a historical farming town site in Chinese Camp in Tuolumne County, California, United States. The site of Jacksonville, California is California Historical Landmark No. 419, listed on February 28, 1949. The town is now under the Don Pedro Reservoir, formed in 1924. Jacksonville was founded by farmer Julian Smart along the Tuolumne River at an elevation of 800 feet. In spring 1849, Smart planted a garden and an orchard. Smart named the town Jacksonville after Colonel A. M. Jackson. The Tuolumne River provided water not only for the farms but the many 49 California Gold Rush mining operations in the region. In 1852 a US post office opened with a population of 252. The largest mine in the region was the Eagle-Shawmut mine.

A Jacksonville historical marker is on a Vista point on California State Route 120, 3.5 miles southeast of Chinese Camp. The marker was placed there by the Sonora Rotary Club and Tuolumne County Gold Centennial Committee in 1950.

== See also ==
- California Historical Landmarks in Tuolumne County
