= Ken Drake (actor) =

American actor (1921–1987)

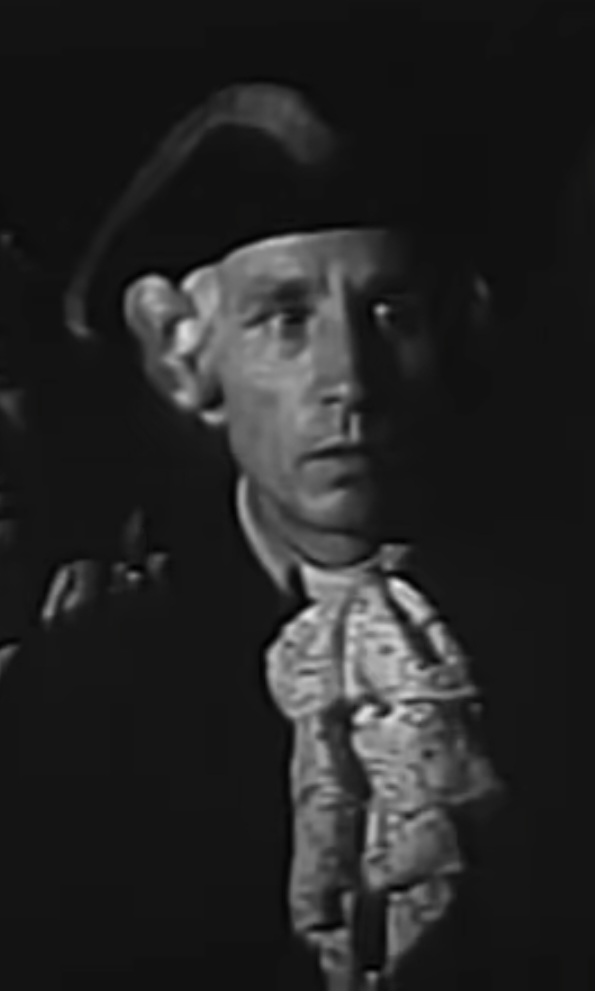
- Ken Drake in the TV series One Step Beyond, episode Night of Decision
- Born: November 20, 1921; Enid, Oklahoma, U.S.
- Died: January 30, 1987 (aged 65); Springfield, California, U.S.
- Occupation: Actor
- Years active: 1953–1972
- Spouse: Sylvie Drake
- Children: 2

Ken Drake (November 20, 1921 – January 30, 1987) was an American actor. He appeared in numerous films and TV series from the 1950s to the 1970s.

== Biography ==
Drake was born in Eufaula, Oklahoma, in 1921. After serving in the Navy and Marines during World War II and in Korea as a doctor, he graduated from the Pasadena Playhouse and started working with the Stage Society shortly afterwards. He appeared in over 60 television shows and in several films during his career, starting his acting career during the 1950s in films and TV series such as The Bigamist, The Shrike, Science Fiction Theatre, The Millionaire, The Silent Service, Harbor Command, Target, Highway Patrol, Mackenzie's Raiders and Border Patrol among others.

During that time, he also appeared in stage, in plays such as Othello and Medea.

He continued to appear in several films and TV series during the 1960s and 1970s like Pete and Gladys, Sea Hunt, King of Diamonds, The Everglades, Wide Country, The Beverly Hillbillies, Bonanza, Bat Masterson, Mission: Impossible and The Great Northfield Minnesota Raid.

== Personal life and death ==
Drake was married to Sylvie Drake (née Franco) a writer, theater columnist, and critic for The Los Angeles Times.

Drake died on January 30, 1987, in Springfield, California, at the age of 65.

== Selected filmography ==
=== Film ===
- The Bigamist (1953) - Court Clerk
- The Shrike (1955) - Author
- The Power of the Resurrection (1958) - Marcus
- I Bury the Living (1958) - Bill Honegger
- Crime and Punishment U.S.A. (1959) - Hendricks
- The New Interns (1964) - Parking Lot Attendant
- The Great Northfield Minnesota Raid (1972) - uncredited

=== Television ===
- Science Fiction Theatre (1955) - Divinity Student Astronaut Trainee
- The Millionaire (1956) - Andre the Photographer
- The Silent Service (1957) - Sailor/Seaman
- Harbor Command (1957) - Frank Chaney
- Target (1958) - uncredited
- Highway Patrol (1958) - Joe Hodges/Ohio Cop Killer
- Mackenzie's Raiders (1959) - Gang Member
- Border Patrol (1959) - Andre DeChagny
- Men Into Space (1959) - Prof. Emerson
- Bat Masterson (1959) - Town Sheriff
- Tombstone Territory (1957 - 1960) - Marshal Dave/Frank Masters
- Law of the Plainsman (1960) - Bill Down
- Not for Hire (1960) - Bragan/Col. Bragan
- Lock-Up (1960) - Stark/Swanson
- Bat Masterson (1960) - Gunslinger Colby
- The Aquanauts (1961) - Elmer Burside
- The Americans (1961) - Bravo
- Peter Gunn (1961) - Prof. Jody
- The Life and Legend of Wyatt Earp (1960-1961) - Tim Murdock/Jack Grey
- Alcoa Presents: One Step Beyond (1959-1961) - Maj. Warren/Gas Man
- Bat Masterson (1958-1961) - Scratchy/Ron Daigle/Secret
- Pete and Gladys (1961) - Gary Milhouse
- Sea Hunt (1958-1961) - George Hilman/Steve Walker/Dr. Levy, Season 3, Episode 28
- Sea Hunt (1961) - Season 4, Episodes 8, 37
- King of Diamonds (1962) - Caldwell
- Outlaws (1960-1962) - Ten Horses/First Robber
- The Everglades (1962) - Newcomb/Alexander Duncan
- Wide Country (1962) - Lester
- The Beverly Hillbillies (1962) - First Psychiatrist
- Ripcord (1961-1963) - Rep Fant/Hal Lundy/FBI Agent
- Death Valley Days (1963) - Mark St. James
- Empire (1963) - Ludwell
- The Twilight Zone (1961-1963) - Daniel/Man
- Arrest and Trial (1963) - Motorcycle Shop Foreman
- The Lieutenant (1964) - Ship's Doctor
- Destry (1964) - The Deputy
- The Great Adventure (1964) - Boatman
- Dr. Kildare (1964) - Mr. Phelps
- The New Interns (1964) - Parking Lot Attendant
- Flipper (1964) - Dorrie Stone
- The Outer Limits (1964) - The Judge
- Profiles in Courage (1964) - Minister
- The Man from U.N.C.L.E. (1965) - Doctor
- Ben Casey (1965) - Mr. Dunn
- Kraft Suspense Theatre (1965) - Monty Warneke
- Petticoat Junction (1965) - Clarence McGill
- The Loner (1965) - Simon Townsend
- Tarzan (1966) - Karim/Dude
- The Big Valley (1966) - Dr. Merar/Dr. Briggs
- Twelve O'Clock High (1965-1967) - Communications Officer/Brig. Gen. Krasker
- Run for Your Life (1967) - Minister
- The Rat Patrol (1967) - Lt. Klundt
- Cimarron Strip (1968) - R.B. Forbes
- The Wild Wild West (1967-1968) - General Crocker/Professor Frimm
- Gunsmoke (1957-1968) - Parker/Sheriff/Cowboy
- Here's Lucy (1968) - Butler
- Bonanza (1960-1969) - Leatham/Sam Jacks/Deputy Jackson
- The Bold Ones:The Lawyers (1969) - Chaplain
- Hawaii Five-0 (1970) - Malden
- Ironside (1970) - Bartender/Riker
- The High Chaparral (1967-1971) - Marshal/Lieutenant Colonel
- Mission: Impossible (1971) - Minister of Defence Karel Sartori
