= Hotel Charlotte (Groveland, California) =

- U.S. National Register of Historic Places
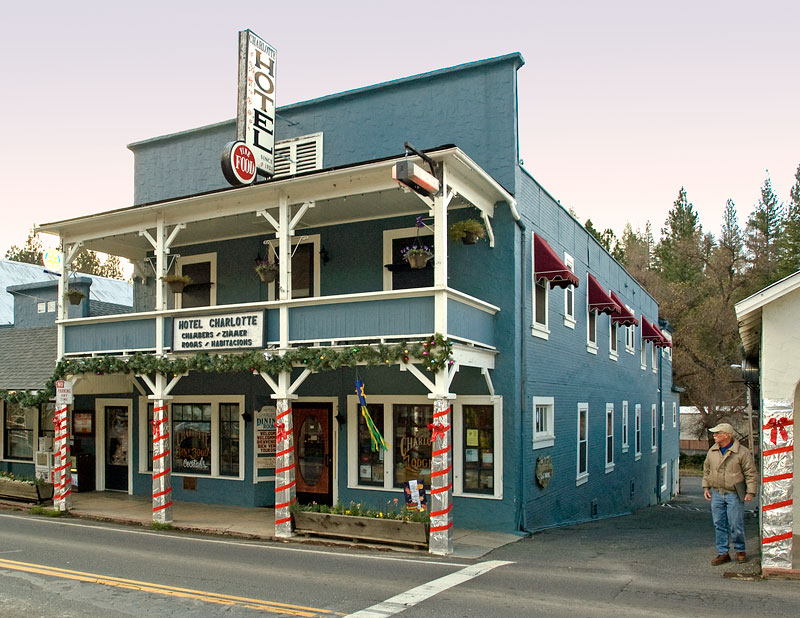
- Hotel Charlotte in 2006

- Location within California Location within the United States
- Location: 18736 Main St. (CA 120), Groveland, California
- Coordinates: 37°50′21″N 120°13′45″W
- Architect: Ferretti, Frank
- Architectural style: Late 19th And 20th Century Revivals
- NRHP reference No.: 94001162
- Added to NRHP: September 26, 1994

The Hotel Charlotte, also known as Hotel Charlotte & Cafe or Hotel Charlotte & Restaurant, is a hotel opened in 1921 in Groveland, California. It was listed on the National Register of Historic Places in 1994.

Charlotte DeFerrari, the hotel's namesake and builder, was born in Genoa, Italy in 1881. Her family migrated to the California gold fields when DeFerrari was sixteen. During this era, the Groveland area went from boom to bust and back again. The gold rush and then the San Francisco Hetch-Hetchy water project brought prosperity and notoriety to the Groveland and Big Oak Flat settlements.

Shortly after arriving in Groveland, DeFerrari's father was killed in a mining accident at Hardin Flat, and young DeFerrari took it upon herself to support and hold the family together. She began cooking for work crews, ranch hands and several local settlers. She then opened a restaurant in the building that is now the Iron Door Saloon, claimed by its proprietors to be the oldest continuously operating saloon in California.

In 1918, DeFerrari built the hotel on the site of an old livery stable, and in 1921 she purchased the Gem Saloon next door, annexing it to the Hotel Charlotte as a restaurant.

In July 2026, Hotel Charlotte filed for Chapter 11 bankruptcy protection.
