= Thoren Bradley =

American social media influencer, lumberjack, and fitness coach

- Born: 1989 or 1990 (age 36–37); Groveland, California
- Education: University of the Pacific (BA, MA)
- Occupations: Fitness coach, social media influencer

Thoren Bradley is an American fitness coach, lumberjack, and social media influencer. Previously a fitness coach, he is best known for his TikTok content, which often features him chopping wood and has been described as thirst trapping. He has also created a fitness app, and advocates for legal abortion, women's equality, and mental health awareness.

== Biography ==
Bradley was born in either 1989 or 1990 and raised in Groveland, California, near Yosemite National Park, to a father who was an arborist and butcher: he died when Bradley was 13. He played soccer in school, and frequently explored the mountains and fished. He also made money through woodchopping. He found himself becoming passionate about fitness, but there were no gyms in town, so a teacher offered that if he got donations for equipment, they would help clear out a space for a school gym.

He originally did not think he was intelligent enough to attend college, considering firefighting and the Air Force, but after encouragement from his mother attended the University of the Pacific, where he earned a Bachelors of Arts in exercise physiology. He paid his way through college by doing woodchopping and manual labor, and was named student of the year. He was then offered a full scholarship for his MA in exercise physiology in exchange for working as a graduate assistant, and accepted the offer.

He subsequently worked as a strength and conditioning coach at a NCAA Division 1 School, and led health and fitness trainings for groups including the police and corporate groups. He began creating social media content in 2017 on Instagram, with a focus on fitness modeling. He also wrote articles for T Nation, a fitness publication. He also sought to become a professor.

In 2020, due to the pandemic putting his job at risk, he became a more full-time content creator and created a TikTok account. His videos began as general fitness and lifestyle content, and he reached 1 million followers before June 2020. In June 2020, he created his first woodchopping video. It soon went viral, and he began creating more content focused on woodchopping and wilderness living not long after. He ultimately left his job as a strength coach to focus on content.

In June 2022, Doja Cat, who he stated he is a fan of, duetted one of his videos. He stated he "immediately ran to the bathroom to throw up" and felt ill for two days from the attention. He has been called the "pre-eminent trapper of thirst on TikTok" by British GQ. MEL described it as being "both eye and ear candy".

In 2025, he, alongside Jason Momoa and others, was featured in a fan-made campaign seeking to fund the National Park Service at Yellowstone National Park. He was not asked previously, but endorsed the campaign.

He has advocated for legal abortion after Dobbs v. Jackson Women's Health Organization, and stated he lost 30,000 followers because of this. He has created content advocating for mental health awareness and focusing on body image, and has expressed a support for psychedelics. He has advocated for women's equality. He has also stated his platform is a "safe space" for people "exploring their sexuality": 48% of his followers were male as of 2022.

He created fitness app Ōhk in 2021, and renamed it Dōse in 2023. As of 2024, he had 10.1 million TikTok followers and a further 1.7 million Instagram followers. He has stated the only trees he chop are dead, diseased, or threatening from a conservation standpoint, and that he now donates all the wood he chops to neighbors. He makes $150,000 per year. He has stated he also regularly hunts wild hog and does cliff jumping, and has asserted that he's been "living on the line of what masculinity really means his whole life".

He was named one of People's 2024 Creators of the Year, where he was called a "wood-chopping king". The Guardian cited him as one of the leaders of the wood-chopping trend.
