= Parrott's Ferry =

Historical place in Tuolumne County, United States

Parrott’s Ferry
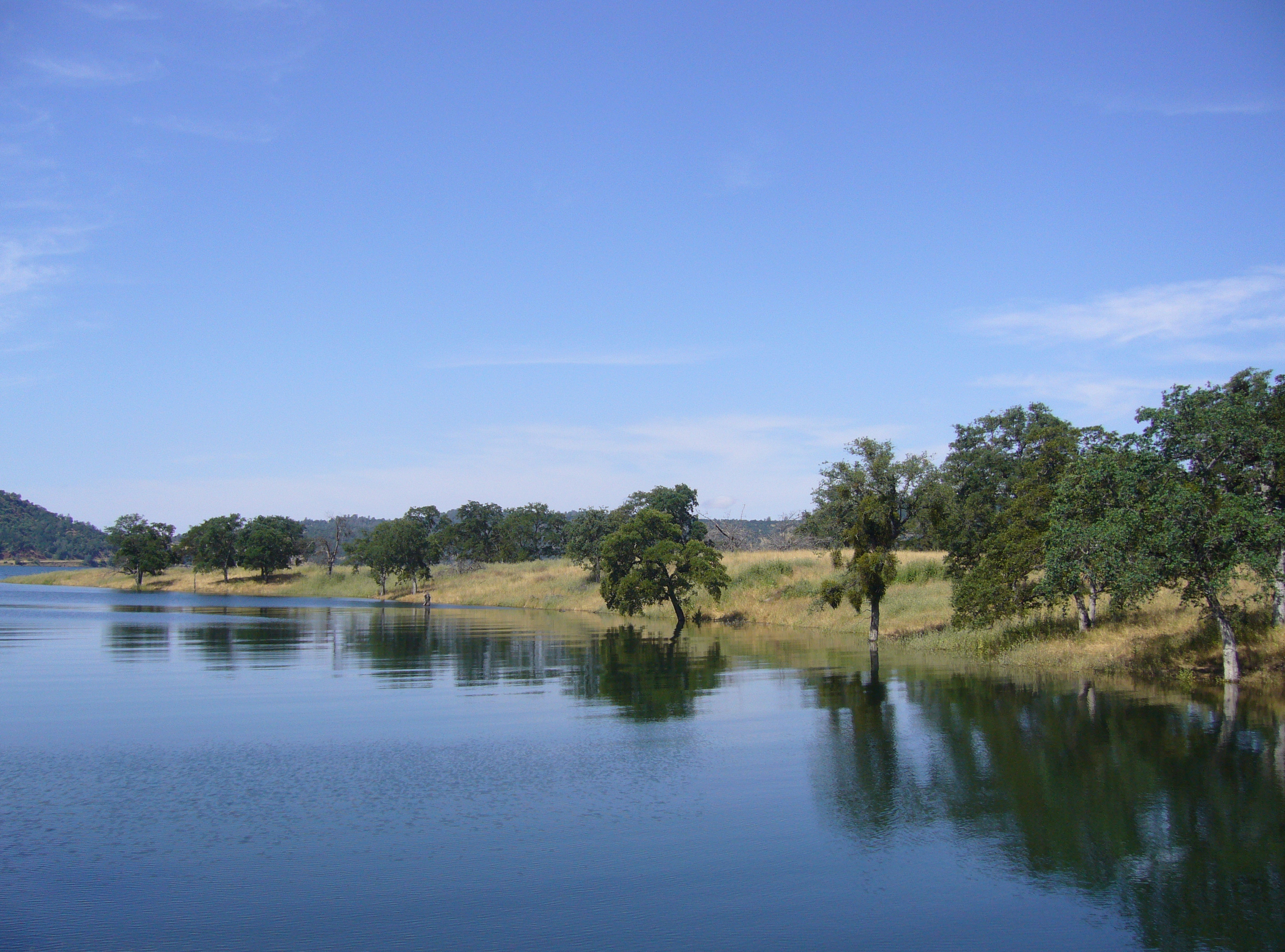
- New Melones Lake site of former Parrott’s Ferry

- Location within California Location within the United States
- 38.039517°N 120.456417°W
- Location: Parrott’s Ferry Road, Columbia, California.

History
- Built: 1860, 166 years ago

Site notes
- Architect: Thomas H. Parrott
- Architectural style: Cable ferry

California Historical Landmark
- Designated: June 2, 1949
- Reference no.: 438

Parrott's Ferry is a historical cable ferry site in Columbia, California in Tuolumne County, California. It is California Historical Landmark No. 438, listed on June 2, 1949.

Parrott's Ferry was built by Thomas H. Parrott in 1860. The ferry crossed the Stanislaus River, connected the mining towns of Columbia and Vallecito. A bridge across the river was built in 1903, ending the need for the ferry. The ferry used a large wooden flat bottom boat, a type of barge. In some summers the water level was too low for the ferry to operate, so a sandbag dam was built on the river to raise the water level at the ferry, and heavy-duty cables were used to pull the ferry across the river. The site is now under water, since the New Melones Lake reservoir was created with the New Melones Dam.

A historical marker is near the former site of Parrott's Ferry at on the Parrott's Ferry Road (E18) and the Columbia-Vallecito Highway Bridge over the Stanislaus Rive, five miles northwest of Columbia. It was placed there on October 2, 1949 by the California Centennials Commission, working with the Aronos Research Club of Sonora.

== See also ==
- California Historical Landmarks in Tuolumne County
