= Soulsbyville, California =

Soulsbyville
- census-designated place
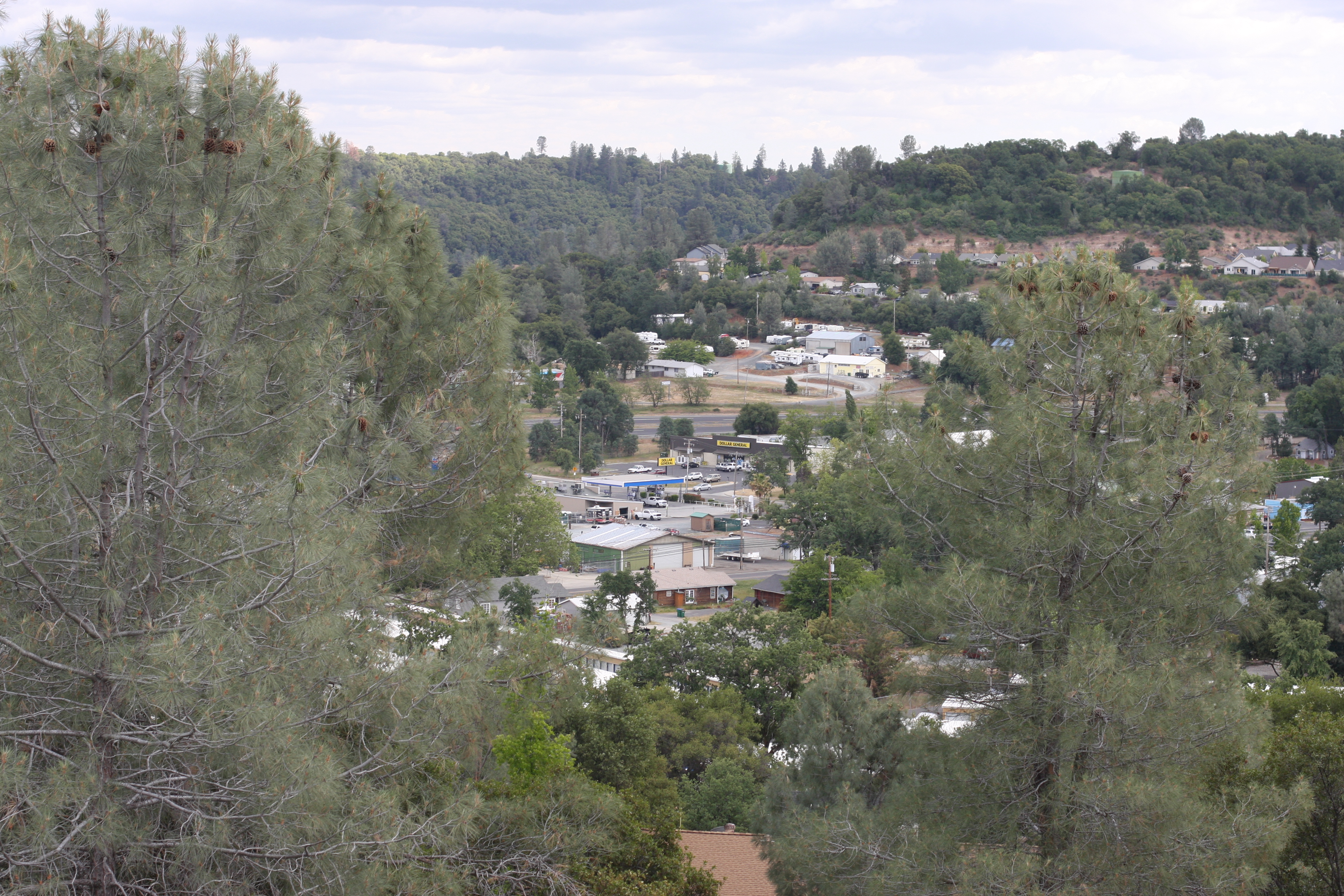
- Landscape view of Soulsbyville

- Location in Tuolumne County and the state of California

- Location in the United States
- Coordinates: 37°59′42″N 120°15′37″W
- Country: United States
- State: California
- County: Tuolumne

Area
  - Total: 3.016 sq mi (7.812 km^{2})
  - Land: 3.010 sq mi (7.796 km^{2})
  - Water: 0.0062 sq mi (0.016 km^{2}) 0.20%
- Elevation: 2,930 ft (893 m)

Population (2020)
  - Total: 2,092
  - Density: 695.0/sq mi (268.3/km^{2})
- Time zone: UTC-8 (Pacific (PST))
  - Summer (DST): UTC-7 (PDT)
- ZIP code: 95372
- Area code: 209
- FIPS code: 06-72772
- GNIS feature ID: 1659818

California Historical Landmark
- Reference no.: 420

Soulsbyville is an unincorporated census-designated place in Tuolumne County, California, United States. The population was 2,092 at the time of the 2020 census, down from 2,215 at the time of the 2010 census. Formerly a California Gold Rush town, Soulsbyville is now registered as a California Historical Landmark.

== Geography ==
Soulsbyville is located at 37°59′42″N 120°15′37″W (37.994999, -120.260258).

According to the United States Census Bureau, the community has a total area of 3.0 square miles (7.8 km^{2}), of which 99.80% is land and 0.20% is water.

== Demographics ==
Historical population
Census	Pop.	Note	%±
1990	1,732		—
2000	1,729		−0.2%
2010	2,215		28.1%
2020	2,092		−5.6%
U.S. Decennial Census; 1990 2000 2010

Soulsbyville first appeared as a census designated place in the 2000 U.S. census.

=== Racial and ethnic composition ===
Soulsbyville CDP, California – Racial and ethnic composition Note: the US Census treats Hispanic/Latino as an ethnic category. This table excludes Latinos from the racial categories and assigns them to a separate category. Hispanics/Latinos may be of any race.
Race / Ethnicity (NH = Non-Hispanic)	Pop 2000	Pop 2010	Pop 2020	% 2000	% 2010	% 2020
White alone (NH)	1,517	1,904	1,602	87.74%	85.96%	76.58%
Black or African American alone (NH)	0	1	6	0.00%	0.05%	0.29%
Native American or Alaska Native alone (NH)	38	30	30	2.20%	1.35%	1.43%
Asian alone (NH)	6	10	17	0.35%	0.45%	0.81%
Native Hawaiian or Pacific Islander alone (NH)	1	2	6	0.06%	0.09%	0.29%
Other race alone (NH)	0	2	19	0.00%	0.09%	0.91%
Mixed race or Multiracial (NH)	29	60	148	1.68%	2.71%	7.07%
Hispanic or Latino (any race)	138	206	264	7.98%	9.30%	12.62%
Total	1,729	2,215	2,092	100.00%	100.00%	100.00%

=== 2020 census ===
As of the 2020 census, Soulsbyville had a population of 2,092. The population density was 695.0 inhabitants per square mile (268.3/km^{2}). The whole population lived in households. The median age was 45.2 years. The age distribution was 20.4% under the age of 18, 6.4% aged 18 to 24, 23.1% aged 25 to 44, 27.3% aged 45 to 64, and 22.8% who were 65 years of age or older. For every 100 females, there were 101.0 males, and for every 100 females age 18 and over there were 99.0 males age 18 and over.

93.2% of residents lived in urban areas, while 6.8% lived in rural areas.

Racial composition as of the 2020 census
Race	Number	Percent
White	1,691	80.8%
Black or African American	6	0.3%
American Indian and Alaska Native	34	1.6%
Asian	19	0.9%
Native Hawaiian and Other Pacific Islander	6	0.3%
Some other race	64	3.1%
Two or more races	272	13.0%

There were 833 households, out of which 22.7% included children under the age of 18. Of all households, 53.4% were married-couple households, 5.9% were cohabiting couple households, 22.2% had a female householder with no spouse or partner present, and 18.5% had a male householder with no spouse or partner present. 27.6% of households were one person, and 17.1% had someone living alone who was 65 years of age or older. The average household size was 2.51. There were 556 families (66.7% of all households).

There were 899 housing units at an average density of 298.7 units per square mile (115.3 units/km^{2}), of which 833 (92.7%) were occupied. Of these, 84.5% were owner-occupied, and 15.5% were occupied by renters. Of all housing units, 7.3% were vacant. The homeowner vacancy rate was 2.2%, and the rental vacancy rate was 0.0%.

=== Income and poverty ===
In 2023, the US Census Bureau estimated that the median household income was $92,996, and the per capita income was $33,226. About 3.3% of families and 4.4% of the population were below the poverty line.

=== 2010 census ===
The 2010 United States census reported that Soulsbyville had a population of 2,215. The population density was 734.3 inhabitants per square mile (283.5/km^{2}). The racial makeup of Soulsbyville was 2,038 (92.0%) White, 3 (0.1%) African American, 41 (1.9%) Native American, 13 (0.6%) Asian, 2 (0.1%) Pacific Islander, 38 (1.7%) from other races, and 80 (3.6%) from two or more races. Hispanic or Latino of any race were 206 persons (9.3%).

The Census reported that 2,215 people (100% of the population) lived in households, 0 (0%) lived in non-institutionalized group quarters, and 0 (0%) were institutionalized.

There were 871 households, of which 257 (29.5%) had children under the age of 18 living in them, 488 (56.0%) were opposite-sex married couples living together, 72 (8.3%) had a female householder with no husband present, 41 (4.7%) had a male householder with no wife present. There were 49 (5.6%) unmarried opposite-sex partnerships, and 4 (0.5%) same-sex married couples or partnerships. 200 households (23.0%) were made up of individuals, and 82 (9.4%) had someone living alone who was 65 years of age or older. The average household size was 2.54. There were 601 families (69.0% of all households); the average family size was 3.01.

502 people (22.7%) were under the age of 18, 163 people (7.4%) aged 18 to 24, 490 people (22.1%) aged 25 to 44, 710 people (32.1%) aged 45 to 64, and 350 people (15.8%) who were 65 years of age or older. The median age was 42.9 years. For every 100 females, there were 101.4 males. For every 100 females age 18 and over, there were 97.6 males.

There were 959 housing units at an average density of 317.9 per square mile (122.7/km^{2}), of which 673 (77.3%) were owner-occupied, and 198 (22.7%) were occupied by renters. The homeowner vacancy rate was 3.0%; the rental vacancy rate was 2.4%. 1,673 people (75.5% of the population) lived in owner-occupied housing units and 542 people (24.5%) lived in rental housing units.

== History ==
Soulsbyville is named after Ben Soulsby, who resided in the area during the California Gold Rush. Soulsby discovered gold, and the mine and gold mill (and town, and school and ridge and ditch) named after him was near the intersection of Community Drive and Soulsbyville Road.

== Government ==
In the California State Legislature, Soulsbyville is in the 4th senatorial district, represented by Republican Marie Alvarado-Gil, and the 8th Assembly district, represented by Republican David Tangipa.

In the United States House of Representatives, Soulsbyville is in California's 5th congressional district, represented by Republican Tom McClintock.

== California Historical Landmark ==
Soulsbyville is a California Historical Landmark. California Historical Landmark number 420 reads:

NO. 420 SOULSBYVILLE - Site of the famous Soulsby Mine (discovered by Benjamin Soulsby), Soulsbyville is the first community in Tuolumne County to be founded (1855) entirely upon the operation of a lode mine. First to work the mine were hard rock miners from Cornwall, England, the first group of 499 Cornishmen arrived in 1858

== See also ==
- California Historical Landmarks in Tuolumne County, California
