= Wells Fargo Express Company Building (Chinese Camp, California) =

Historical place in Tuolumne County, United States

Tuolumne Wells Fargo Express Company Building
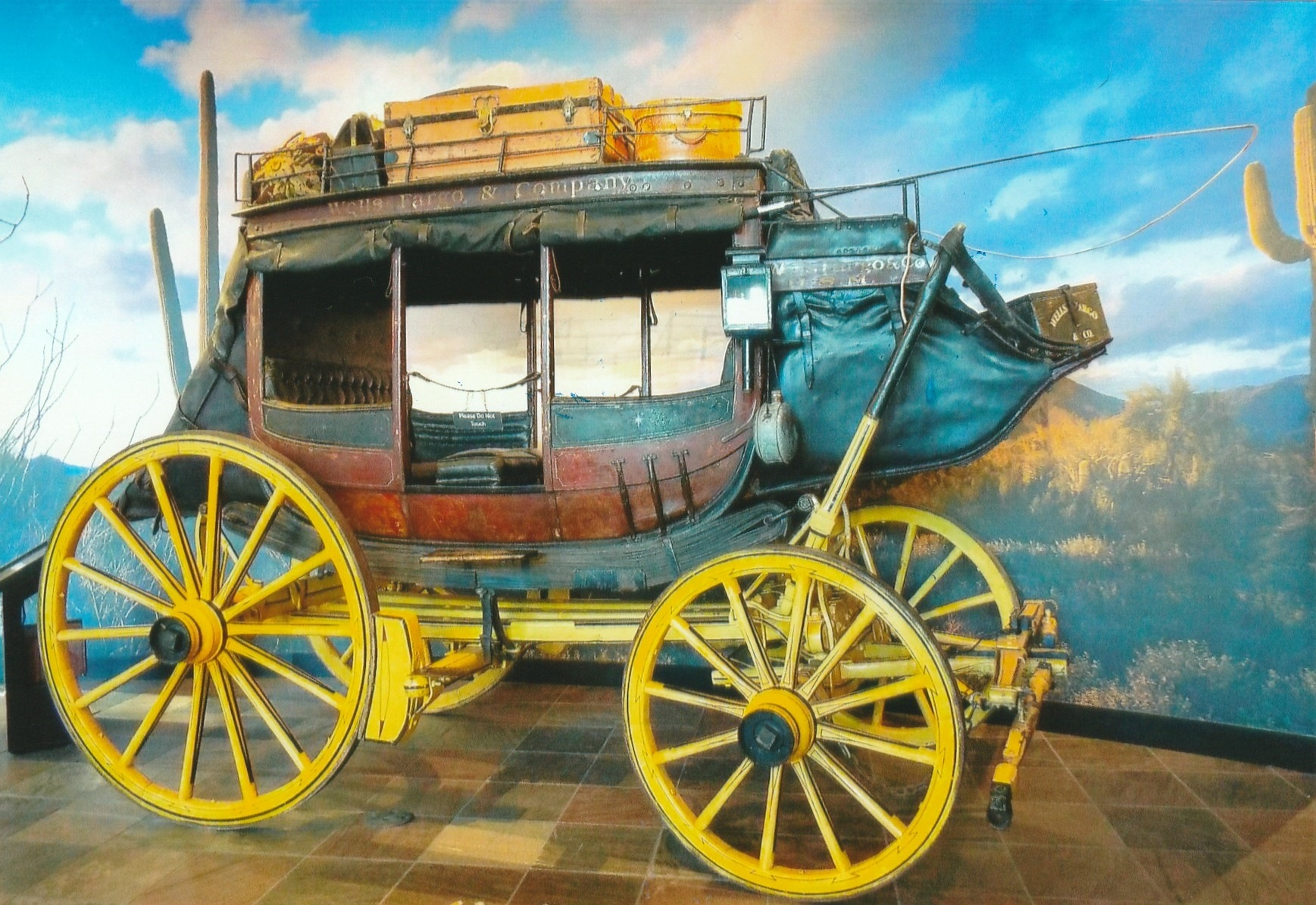
- Wells Fargo Express Stagecoach

- Location within California Location within the United States
- 37.87091°N 120.431692°W
- Location: Chinese Camp, California

History
- Built: 1849, 177 years ago
- Built for: Wells Fargo Express

Site notes
- Architect: Walkerly brothers
- Architectural style: Western Brick

California Historical Landmark
- Designated: June 6, 1934
- Reference no.: 140

Tuolumne Wells Fargo Express Company Building is a historical building in Chinese Camp, California Tuolumne County, California. The Tuolumne Wells Fargo Express Company Building is a California Historical Landmark No. 140 listed on June 6, 1934. The Tuolumne Wells Fargo Express Company Building was built in 1849. Construction was done by the Walkerly brothers. After the Wells Fargo Express moved out the Morris brothers took ownership of the building and it became a general store. Morris brothers also worked with the Adams Express Company. The original express agents were Sol Miller, C. W. H. Solinsky, and the Morris brothers.

Fire from the many wooden buildings and the used of lanterns and candles for lighting made early California Gold Rush have many fires. The Tuolumne Wells Fargo Express Company Building was made of brick, with iron doors and iron window shutters to protect it from fires.

The Tuolumne Wells Fargo Express Company Building is at Main Street and Solinsky Alley in Chinese Camp. The marker was placed there by California Office of Historic Preservation.

- At Tuolumne Wells Fargo Express Company Building is a marker: To Honor Eddie Webb

The marker reads:
Born December 17, 1880, in Snelling, Calif. One of the last of the stage drivers, Eddie made the haul from Chinese Camp to the Coulterville, Groveland areas between 1898-1902 and drove the first mail stage over the new Shawmut Road.
Place by E Clampus Vitus on May 6, 1961.

== See also ==
- California Historical Landmarks in Tuolumne County
