= Sonora-Mono Toll Road =

Historical place in Tuolumne County, United States

Sonora Mono Toll Road
- Location within California Location within the United States
- 38.00369°N 120.40143°W
- Location: [[California State Route 108|CA Hwy 108]], Sugar Pine, California.

History
- Built: 1852, 177 years ago

California Historical Landmark
- Designated: March 4, 1949
- Reference no.: 422

Sonora Mono Toll Road is a historical road in Tuolumne County, California. The Sonora-Mono Road is a California Historical Landmark No. 422 listed on March 4, 1949. Sonora-Mono Road was 49 California Gold Rush road founded in 1852. The Tuolumne County Water Company started the road in 1852. On the road in Sugar Pine, California toll gate, hotel, and stables were built. The road to Bridgeport in Mono County was started in 1860 and completed in 1864. To complete a round trip on the road from Sonora and Bridgeport for a six-horse covered wagon took three weeks. for the round trip between Sonora and Bridgeport. Part of the road uses the Sonora Pass, that explorer Jedediah Smith in 1827.

A historical Sonora-Mono Road marker is on California State Route 108 and the Sugar Pine cutoff in Sugar Pine The marker was placed there by Bodie Chapter No.64, Matuca Chapter No.1849, E Clampus Vitus on September 10, 1983.

== See also ==
- California Historical Landmarks in Tuolumne County
