= California Historical Landmarks in Tuolumne County =

This list includes properties and districts listed on the California Historical Landmark listing in Tuolumne County, California. Click the "Map of all coordinates" link to the right to view a Google map of all properties and districts with latitude and longitude coordinates in the table below.

Image		Landmark name	Location	City or town	Summary
Big Oak Flat	406	Big Oak Flat	Historic district 37°49′22″N 120°15′38″W	Big Oak Flat	
Cherokee	445	Cherokee	Confidence-Tuolumne City Rd. 37°58′47″N 120°14′53″W	Tuolumne City	
Chinese Camp	423	Chinese Camp	Historic district 37°52′16″N 120°25′53″W	Chinese Camp	
Columbia	123	Columbia	Columbia State Historic Park; 38°02′02″N 120°24′04″W	Columbia	
Groveland	446	Groveland	Historic district 37°50′22″N 120°13′47″W	Groveland	
Jacksonville	419	Jacksonville	Vista point near Don Pedro Bridge; 37°50′40″N 120°22′56″W	Chinese Camp	
Jamestown	431	Jamestown	Historic district 37°57′06″N 120°25′26″W	Jamestown	
Mark Twain Cabin	138	Mark Twain Cabin	37°59′56″N 120°28′41″W	Tuttletown	
Upload Photo	122	Montezuma	State Hwy 49; 37°54′40″N 120°27′07″W	Chinese Camp	
Parrott's Ferry	438	Parrott's Ferry	Vista area on Calaveras side of Columbia-Vallecito Highway Bridge; 38°02′22″N 120°27′23″W	Columbia	
St. James Episcopal Church	139	St. James Episcopal Church	42 Snell St; 37°59′14″N 120°23′05″W	Sonora	
Upload Photo	424	Sawmill Flat	Historic district 38°01′22″N 120°22′48″W	Columbia	
Upload Photo	460	Second Garrote	State Hwy 120; 37°49′30″N 120°11′45″W	Groveland	
Upload Photo	395	Shaw's Flat	Shaw's Flat Rd. & Mt. Brow Rd. 38°00′14″N 120°24′05″W	Columbia	
Upload Photo	422	Sonora-Mono Road	State Hwy 108 at Sugar Pine cutoff 38°03′40″N 120°11′58″W	Sugar Pine	
Soulsbyville	420	Soulsbyville	Historic district 37°59′42″N 120°15′37″W	Soulsbyville	
Upload Photo	432	Springfield	Historic district 38°01′15″N 120°24′41″W	Springfield	
Tuttletown	124	Tuttletown	Historic district 37°59′27″N 120°27′43″W	Tuttletown	
Summersville	407	Summersville	Historic district 37°57′42″N 120°14′13″W	Tuolumne City	
Wells Fargo Express Company Building	140	Wells Fargo Express Company Building	Main St. & Solinsky Alley; 37°52′15″N 120°25′54″W	Chinese Camp	

== See also ==
- List of California Historical Landmarks
- National Register of Historic Places listings in Tuolumne County, California
