= Pine Mountain Lake, California =

Pine Mountain Lake
- census-designated place
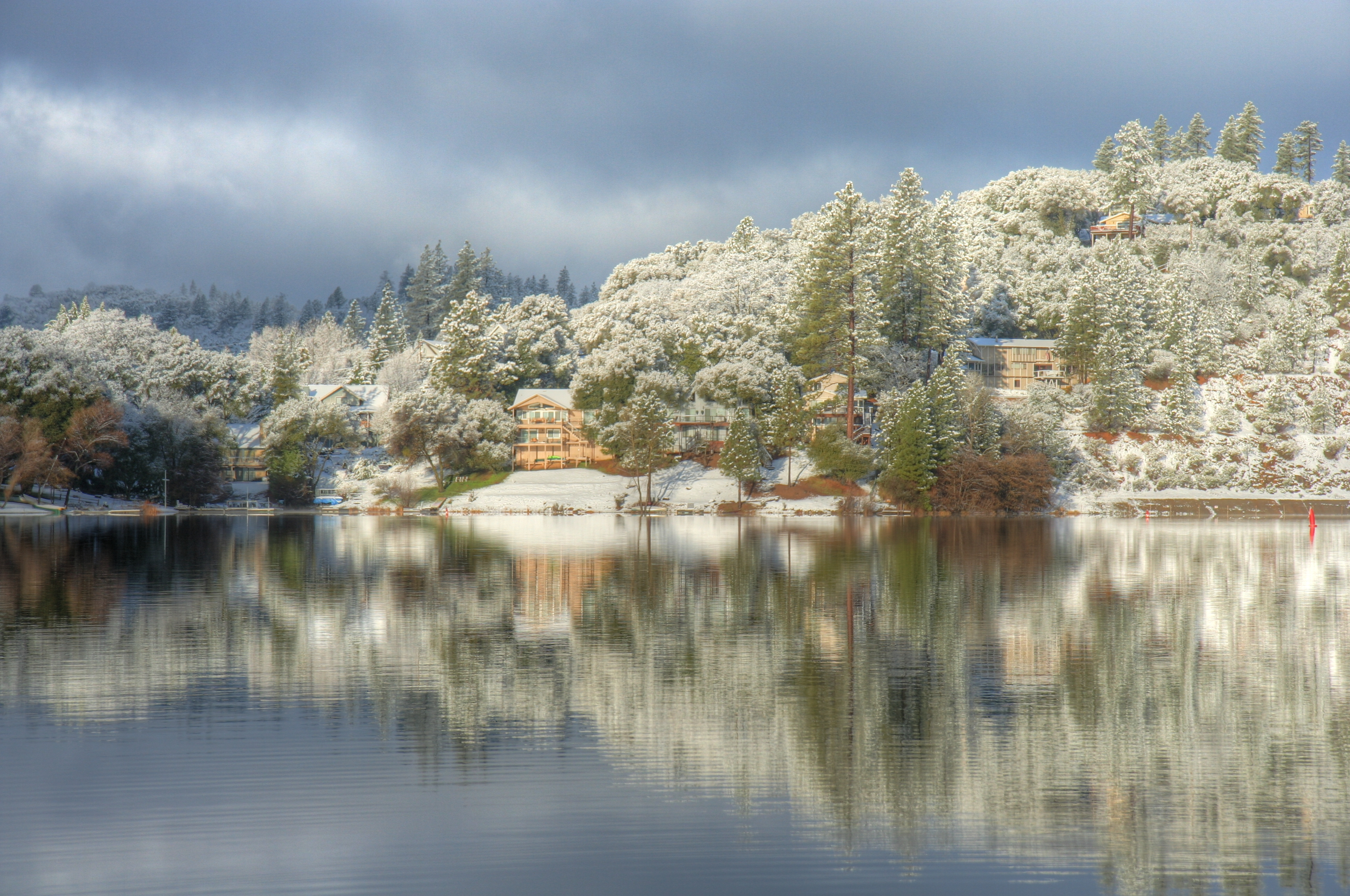
- View across a calm Pine Mountain Lake toward the Dunn Court area

- Position in California.
- Coordinates: 37°51′36″N 120°11′04″W
- Country: United States
- State: California
- County: Tuolumne

Area
  - Total: 19.241 sq mi (49.834 km^{2})
  - Land: 18.961 sq mi (49.108 km^{2})
  - Water: 0.280 sq mi (0.726 km^{2}) 1.46%
- Elevation: 2,795 ft (852 m)

Population (2020)
  - Total: 2,636
  - Density: 139.0/sq mi (53.68/km^{2})
- Time zone: UTC-8 (Pacific (PST))
  - Summer (DST): UTC-7 (PDT)
- ZIP Code: 95321
- Area code: 209
- GNIS feature ID: 2583115

Pine Mountain Lake (PML) is a private gated community and a census-designated place (CDP) in Groveland, located in Tuolumne County, California, United States. It is located 0.8 miles (1.3 km) north and east of downtown Groveland. Pine Mountain Lake sits at an elevation of 2,795 feet (852 m). The 2020 United States census reported Pine Mountain Lake's population was 2,636.

The ZIP Code is 95321. The community is served by area code 209.

The "Gateway to Yosemite", PML is an all-seasons vacation and retirement community. PML includes a private 202-acre (0.82 km^{2}) lake with 6 miles (9.7 km) of shoreline. The community also hosts an 18-hole championship golf course, golf shop, lake lodge, tennis, hiking, horseback riding, swimming, fishing, an airport, and close proximity to local shopping, medical, and government services. PML is 26 miles (42 km) west of Yosemite National Park on State Highway 120. It gets a light dusting of snow in the winter, and has warm summer days, a green spring, and colorful fall.

== About ==
The community of Big Oak Flat was founded by James D. Savage, who began mining the area about 1851. In "Discovery of the Yosemite and the Indian War of 1851 which led to that event" by Lafayette Bunnell, Savage is credited as the leader of the first group of non-Native Americans of European ancestry into Yosemite Valley, on March 27, 1851. Others of European ancestry may have seen the valley as early as 1833. From approximately 1916 to 1924, Big Oak Flat served as a staging area and housing location for workers constructing the Hetch Hetchy Railroad, which was required to build the O'Shaughnessy Dam on the Tuolumne River in the Hetch Hetchy Valley. Big Oak Flat is now registered as California Historical Landmark #406.

The lake is spring-fed and is also fed by Big Creek. It has 210 acres (85.0 ha) of water and 6 miles (10 km) of shoreline. It affords water skiing, sailing, swimming and fishing. It has three sandy swim beaches, a boat launch marina and a fisherman's park. Pine Mountain Lake Association stocks the lake with trout. The lake is surrounded by pines and manzanitas, and most homes cannot be seen from the lake, preserving its wilderness feeling.

The Pine Mountain Lake subdivision was developed by Boise Cascade in the late 1960s with about 3,600 homesites averaging about one third to one half of an acre each. PML offers an equestrian center, tennis, a PGA rated golf course with a full-time golf pro, a "country club," and full-time mobile security patrol. The lake is about 2,546 feet (776 m) feet above mean sea level. The highest points in the community are about 3,100 feet (940 m) AMSL. Altitudes range from about 2,600 to 3,100 ft (940 m). Temperatures range from the 20–30 °F in winter to 80–90 °F in the summer.

Groveland has Tenaya Elementary School (grades K–8) and Tioga High School (grades 9–12), part of the Big Oak Flat-Groveland Unified School District. Columbia College (California) is about 25 miles (40 km) down the hill in Columbia, 2 miles (3 km) from Sonora (about 22 miles (35 km) from Groveland).

== Geography ==
According to the United States Census Bureau, the CDP covers an area of 19.2 square miles (49.8 km^{2}), of which 19.0 square miles (49.1 km^{2}) is land and 0.3 square mile (0.7 km^{2}) is (1.46%) water.

== Demographics ==
Historical population
Census	Pop.	Note	%±
2010	2,796		—
2020	2,636		−5.7%
U.S. Decennial Census; 1850–1870 1880-1890; 1900 1910 1920; 1930 1940 1950; 1960 1970 1980; 1990 2000 2010

Pine Mountain Lake first appeared as a census-designated place in the 2010 United States census formed from part of the deleted Groveland-Big Oak Flat CDP and additional area.

=== Racial and ethnic composition ===
Pine Mountain Lake CDP, California – Racial and ethnic composition Note: the US Census treats Hispanic/Latino as an ethnic category. This table excludes Latinos from the racial categories and assigns them to a separate category. Hispanics/Latinos may be of any race.
Race / Ethnicity (NH = Non-Hispanic)	Pop 2010	Pop 2020	% 2010	% 2020
White alone (NH)	2,475	2,181	88.52%	82.74%
Black or African American alone (NH)	10	10	0.36%	0.38%
Native American or Alaska Native alone (NH)	20	16	0.72%	0.61%
Asian alone (NH)	23	33	0.82%	1.25%
Native Hawaiian or Pacific Islander alone (NH)	7	6	0.25%	0.23%
Other race alone (NH)	1	23	0.04%	0.87%
Mixed race or Multiracial (NH)	77	150	2.75%	5.69%
Hispanic or Latino (any race)	183	217	6.55%	8.23%
Total	2,796	2,636	100.00%	100.00%

=== 2020 census ===
As of the 2020 census, Pine Mountain Lake had a population of 2,636, with a population density of 139.0 inhabitants per square mile (53.7/km^{2}).

The median age was 63.2 years. The age distribution was 9.7% under the age of 18, 3.8% aged 18 to 24, 14.5% aged 25 to 44, 25.3% aged 45 to 64, and 46.8% aged 65 or older. For every 100 females there were 106.3 males, and for every 100 females age 18 and over there were 104.9 males age 18 and over.

Racial composition as of the 2020 census
Race	Number	Percent
White	2,236	84.8%
Black or African American	11	0.4%
American Indian and Alaska Native	23	0.9%
Asian	37	1.4%
Native Hawaiian and Other Pacific Islander	6	0.2%
Some other race	73	2.8%
Two or more races	250	9.5%

The census reported that 99.7% of the population lived in households, 0.3% lived in non-institutionalized group quarters, and no one was institutionalized. There were 1,292 households, of which 13.4% included children under the age of 18, 51.7% were married-couple households, 6.1% were cohabiting couple households, 21.7% had a female householder with no spouse or partner present, and 20.5% had a male householder with no spouse or partner present. About 31.7% of households were one person, and 18.7% were one person aged 65 or older. The average household size was 2.03, and there were 805 families (62.3% of all households).

There were 3,055 housing units at an average density of 161.1 units per square mile (62.2 units/km^{2}). Of all housing units, 42.3% were occupied and 57.7% were vacant; among occupied units, 83.2% were owner-occupied and 16.8% were occupied by renters. The homeowner vacancy rate was 1.9% and the rental vacancy rate was 5.5%.

0.0% of residents lived in urban areas, while 100.0% lived in rural areas.

Pine Mountain Lake, as well as the greater Groveland area, sits within Census Block 06109004200, which includes large portions of both southern Tuolumne County, as well as northern portions of Mariposa County.

=== 2010 census ===
Pine Mountain Lake first appeared as a census-designated place in the 2010 United States census formed from part of the deleted Groveland-Big Oak Flat CDP and additional area.

== Government ==
In the California State Legislature, Pine Mountain Lake is in the 4th senatorial district, represented by Republican Marie Alvarado-Gil, and the 8th Assembly district, represented by Republican David Tangipa.

In the United States House of Representatives, Pine Mountain Lake is in California's 5th congressional district, represented by Republican Tom McClintock.

== Airport ==
The Groveland/Yosemite Airport is five miles (8 km) from the intersection of Ferretti Road and California State Route 120. The facility has an FAA identifier of E45 and features a single runway roughly 3,600 feet (1,100 m) long.

== See also ==
- Groveland-Big Oak Flat, California
- Buck Meadows, California

== Sources ==
- Map: "Stanislaus National Forest, California," U.S. Forest Service, 1979.
- Map: "Groveland, California," U.S. Geological Survey, 1987.
- Airport Facility Directory: Southwest U.S., U.S. Department of Transportation, Federal Aviation Administration, unknown date.
