= Groveland-Big Oak Flat, California =

Unincorporated community in California, United States

Groveland-Big Oak Flat
- unincorporated community; former census-designated place
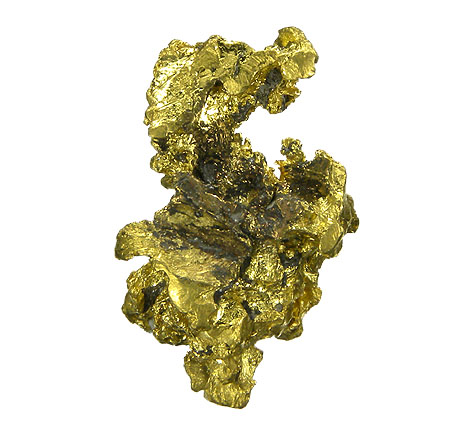
- Gold specimen from the old Eureka mine in Big Oak Flat

- Location in Tuolumne County and the state of California
- Coordinates: 37°50′45″N 120°12′28″W
- Country: United States
- State: California
- County: Tuolumne

Area
  - Total: 28.8 sq mi (74.6 km^{2})
  - Land: 28.5 sq mi (73.9 km^{2})
  - Water: 0.27 sq mi (0.7 km^{2})
- Elevation: 2,552 ft (778 m)

Population (2000)
  - Total: 3,388
  - Density: 118/sq mi (45.4/km^{2})
- Time zone: UTC-8 (Pacific Time Zone)
  - Summer (DST): UTC-7 (PDT)
- ZIP codes: 95305-95321
- Area code: 209
- FIPS code: 06-31375
- GNIS feature ID: 2408339

California Historical Landmark
- Official name: Big Oak Flat
- Reference no.: 406

Groveland-Big Oak Flat is an unincorporated community and former census-designated place (CDP) in Tuolumne County, California, United States. The population was 3,388 at the 2000 census. This CDP included the communities of Groveland, Big Oak Flat and Pine Mountain Lake (PML).

The CDP was abolished prior to the 2010 census, and Groveland and Pine Mountain Lake were made into separate CDPs.

The town hosts an annual 49er Festival on the 3rd Saturday of September, hosted by the Yosemite Chamber of Commerce, . Groveland is the location of the Groveland Ranger District office of the Stanislaus National Forest. The Groveland Community Services District provides services, including fire protection, to the community . The Department of Forestry and Fire Protection, Tuolumne-Calaveras Ranger Unit, Battalion 16, has a Forest Fire Station west of Groveland on State Route 120.

== Geography and climate ==
Groveland-Big Oak Flat is located at 37°50′45″N 120°12′28″W. Elevation is 867 m (2,846 ft).

According to the United States Census Bureau, the CDP has a total area of 28.8 square miles (75 km^{2}), of which, 28.5 square miles (74 km^{2}) of it is land and 0.3 square miles (0.78 km^{2}) of it (0.90%) is water.

Groveland has cold, wet winters and very warm, mostly dry summers. Average January temperatures are a maximum of 57.5 °F and a minimum of 30.2 °F. Average July temperatures are a maximum of 90.8 °F and a minimum of 54.2 °F. There are an average of 32.4 days with highs of 90 °F (32 °C) or higher and an average of 81.6 days with lows of 32 °F (0 °C) or lower. The highest recorded temperature was 103 °F on July 26, 1980, and the lowest recorded temperature was -2 °F on January 30, 1916.

Annual precipitation averages 37.28 inches. There are an average of 58 days with measurable precipitation. The wettest year was 1982 with 66.95 inches and the dryest year was 1976 with 12.27 inches. The most precipitation in one month was 30.76 inches in January 1911. The most precipitation in 24 hours was 8.26 inches on January 27, 1914. Average annual snowfall is 15.3 inches. The snowiest year was 1967 with 65.0 inches. The most snow in one month was 42.0 inches in April 1967.

== Demographics ==
Historical population
Census	Pop.	Note	%±
1990	2,753		—
2000	3,388		23.1%
U.S. Decennial Census; 1850–1870 1880-1890; 1900 1910 1920; 1930 1940 1950; 1960 1970 1980; 1990 2000 2010

Groveland-Big Oak Flat fist appeared as a census designated place in the 1990 U.S. census. It was split into the Groveland CDP and the Pine Mountain Lake CDP prior to the 2010 U.S. census.

Groveland-Big Oak Flat CDP, California – Racial and ethnic composition Note: the US Census treats Hispanic/Latino as an ethnic category. This table excludes Latinos from the racial categories and assigns them to a separate category. Hispanics/Latinos may be of any race.
Race / Ethnicity (NH = Non-Hispanic)	Pop 2000	2000
White alone (NH)	3,030	89.43%
Black or African American alone (NH)	22	0.65%
Native American or Alaska Native alone (NH)	50	1.48%
Asian alone (NH)	24	0.71%
Native Hawaiian or Pacific Islander alone (NH)	3	0.09%
Other race alone (NH)	1	0.03%
Mixed race or Multiracial (NH)	91	2.69%
Hispanic or Latino (any race)	167	4.93%
Total	3,388	100.00%

As of the census of 2000, there were 3,388 people, 1,533 households, and 1,100 families residing in the CDP. The population density was 118.7 inhabitants per square mile (45.8/km^{2}). There were 2,904 housing units at an average density of 101.7 per square mile (39.3/km^{2}). The racial makeup of the CDP was 92.62% White, 0.65% African American, 1.59% Native American, 0.71% Asian, 0.09% Pacific Islander, 1.06% from other races, and 3.28% from two or more races. Hispanic or Latino of any race were 4.93% of the population.

There were 1,533 households, out of which 18.2% had children under the age of 18 living with them, 62.9% were married couples living together, 6.4% had a female householder with no husband present, and 28.2% were non-families. 22.4% of all households were made up of individuals, and 10.4% had someone living alone who was 65 years of age or older. The average household size was 2.21 and the average family size was 2.55.

In the CDP, the population was spread out, with 17.4% under the age of 18, 3.3% from 18 to 24, 16.5% from 25 to 44, 34.0% from 45 to 64, and 28.8% who were 65 years of age or older. The median age was 54 years. For every 100 females, there were 92.9 males. For every 100 females age 18 and over, there were 93.5 males.

The median income for a household in the CDP was $41,928, and the median income for a family was $48,386. Males had a median income of $39,861 versus $21,161 for females. The per capita income for the CDP was $27,394. About 2.6% of families and 7.0% of the population were below the poverty line, including 9.3% of those under age 18 and 2.0% of those age 65 or over.

== See also ==
- California Historical Landmarks in Tuolumne County, California
