= St. James' Episcopal Church (Sonora, California) =

St. James' Episcopal Church 42 Snell Street Sonora, California
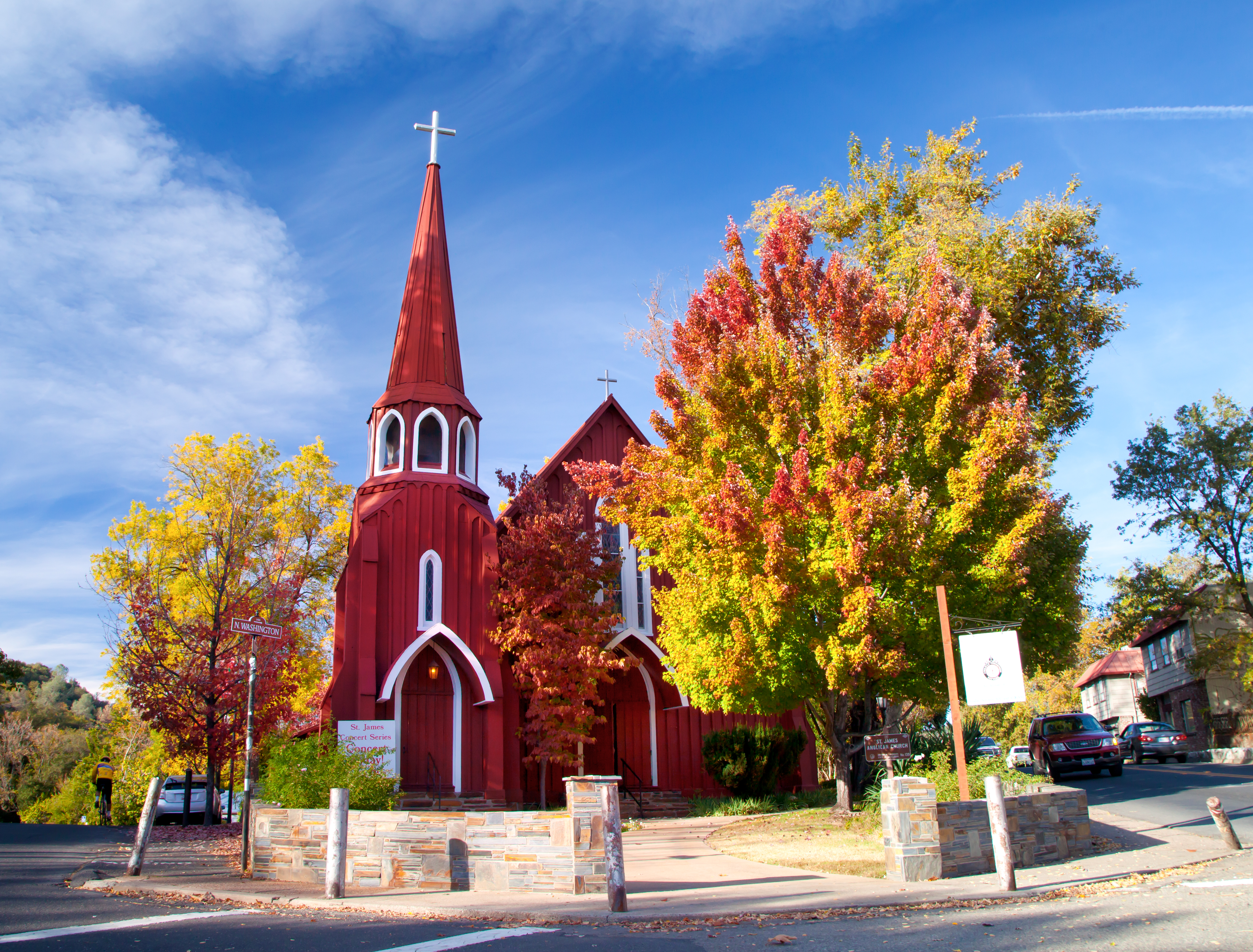
- St. James' Episcopal Church 42 Snell Street Sonora, California
- 37.98738°N 120.38477°W
- Denomination: Episcopal
- Website: http://stjamessonora.com/

History
- Dedication: St. James

Architecture
- Heritage designation: California Historical Landmark #139

Administration
- Province: Episcopal Church USA
- Diocese: Episcopal Diocese of San Joaquin
- Parish: St. James'

Clergy
- Bishop(s): The Most Rev. Michael Bruce Curry; The Rt. Rev. David Rice, Bishop
- Rector: Vacant

St. James' Episcopal Church, also known as The Red Church, is an historic Episcopal church building, formerly Anglican, located at 42 Snell Street, in Sonora, California. Built in 1859 in the Carpenter Gothic style, its board and batten exterior walls are of California redwood and are painted red. It was consecrated in 1870 by the Rt. Rev. William Ingraham Kip, first bishop of the Episcopal Diocese of California. Reportedly the seventh Episcopal parish as well as the oldest Episcopal church building in California, it has been designated California Historical Landmark No. 139.

St. James' took place in the Anglican realignment in the United States, leaving the Episcopal Church and adopting the name of St. James' Anglican Church, then a parish of the Anglican Diocese of San Joaquin and of the Anglican Church in North America. Its previous rector was the Rev. Wolfgang E. Krismanits, who died in a car crash, with his wife, on 27 November 2012.

A schism occurred over various theological issues and a number of the churches in the diocese dissolved their affiliation with The Episcopal Church. They accepted oversight by the province of the Southern Cone, in South America.

A number of Episcopalians wished to remain with the Church. These faithful, with the assistance of the governing bodies of The Episcopal Church, reorganized the diocese. On March 29, 2008, a Special Convention was held, led by the Presiding Bishop of The Episcopal Church, The Most Rev. Katharine Jefferts Schori. The Rt. Rev. Jerry Lamb became the first provisional bishop.

After much time, litigation, and negotiation, St. James', popularly known as “The Red Church” returned to the Episcopal Church. The first service as St. James Episcopal Church was held on July 7, 2013, at 10:00 a.m.

== See also ==
- California Historical Landmarks in Tuolumne County, California
