= Springfield, California =

Unincorporated community in California, United States

- Unincorporated community
- Location within California Location within the United States
- Coordinates: 38°1′15″N 120°24′41″W
- Country: United States
- State: California
- County: Tuolumne
- Elevation: 2,056 ft (627 m)
- Time zone: UTC-8 (Pacific Standard Time)
  - Summer (DST): UTC-7 (Pacific Daylight Time)
- ZIP code: 95370
- Area code: 209

California Historical Landmark
- Reference no.: 432

Springfield is an unincorporated community located in Tuolumne County, California, United States. It is a former California Gold Rush boomtown in the foothills of the Sierra Nevada, and is now designated as a California Historical Landmark. Springfield is located 1.1 mi southwest of Columbia, another gold rush boomtown.

== History ==
Springfield received its name from the abundant springs gushing from limestone boulders on the site. During the town's heyday, up to 150 miners' carts could be seen on the road, hauling gold-bearing dirt from other diggings to the springs of Springfield for washing. The town with its stores, shops, and hotel built around a plaza once boasted 2,000 inhabitants. It is believed to have been founded by Dona Josefa Valmesada, a Mexican woman of means with the reputation of aiding Americans in the war with Mexico.

=== Historical Landmark ===
Springfield is a California Historical Landmark. California Historical Landmark number 432 reads:

NO. 432 SPRINGFIELD - Springfield received its name from the abundant springs gushing from limestone boulders. The town with its stores, shops, and hotel built around a plaza once boasted 2,000 inhabitants. It is believed to have been founded by Dona Josefa Valmesada, a Mexican woman of means with the reputation of aiding Americans in the war with Mexico. During the town's heyday, 150 miners' carts could be seen on the road, hauling gold-bearing dirt to Springfield springs for washing.

== See also ==
- California Historical Landmarks in Tuolumne County, California
