= Iron Door Saloon =

Saloon in California

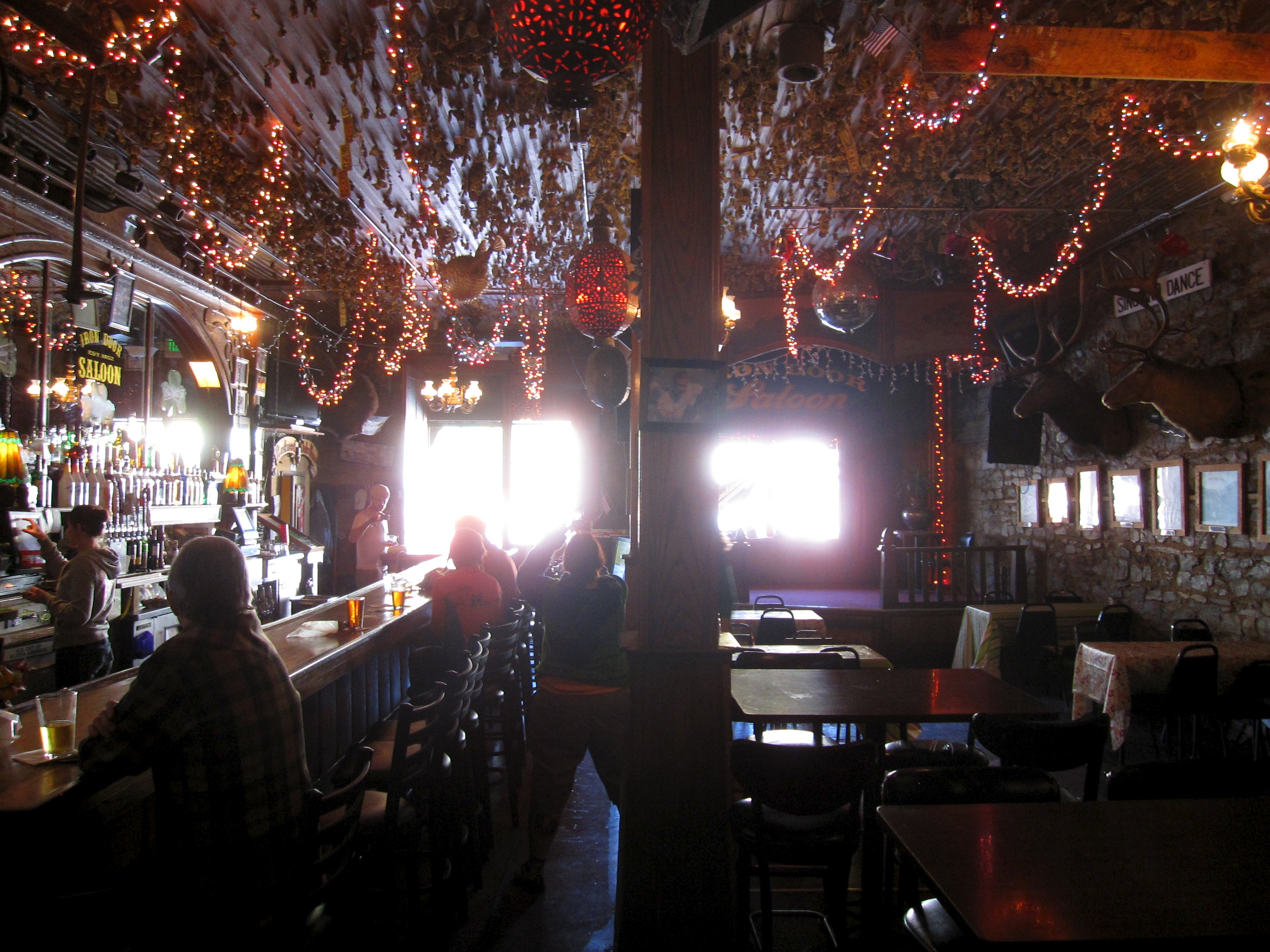
The Iron Door Saloon

The Iron Door Saloon is located at 18761 Main Street in Groveland, California, about twenty-five miles from the entrance of Yosemite National Park. According to its proprietors, it is the oldest continuously operating saloon in California. It remains a popular tourist stop on the main road between The Bay Area and Yosemite.

== History ==
James Tannahill was the first owner of the Granite Store, built of granite, which would later become the Iron Door Saloon. It was built before 1852 in Big Oak Flat, which was renamed Groveland in 1863 when James Tannahill became its first postmaster, and the store its first post office. It first became a saloon, called "Jake's Place", in 1896 when it was purchased by Giacomo DeFarrari.

The building was renamed "The Iron Door Saloon" in 1937, after iron doors, hauled in by mules, were installed. The building was remodeled at that time to add a second story where cards, billiards, and pool were offered for diversion. The doors were meant to aid in fire prevention in case neighboring buildings caught fire.

The interior has the typical decor of an old saloon, with the original bar intact. The ceiling is adorned with dollar bills and historical artifacts. Live music is offered on the weekends.
