= E45 cream =

Skin care product

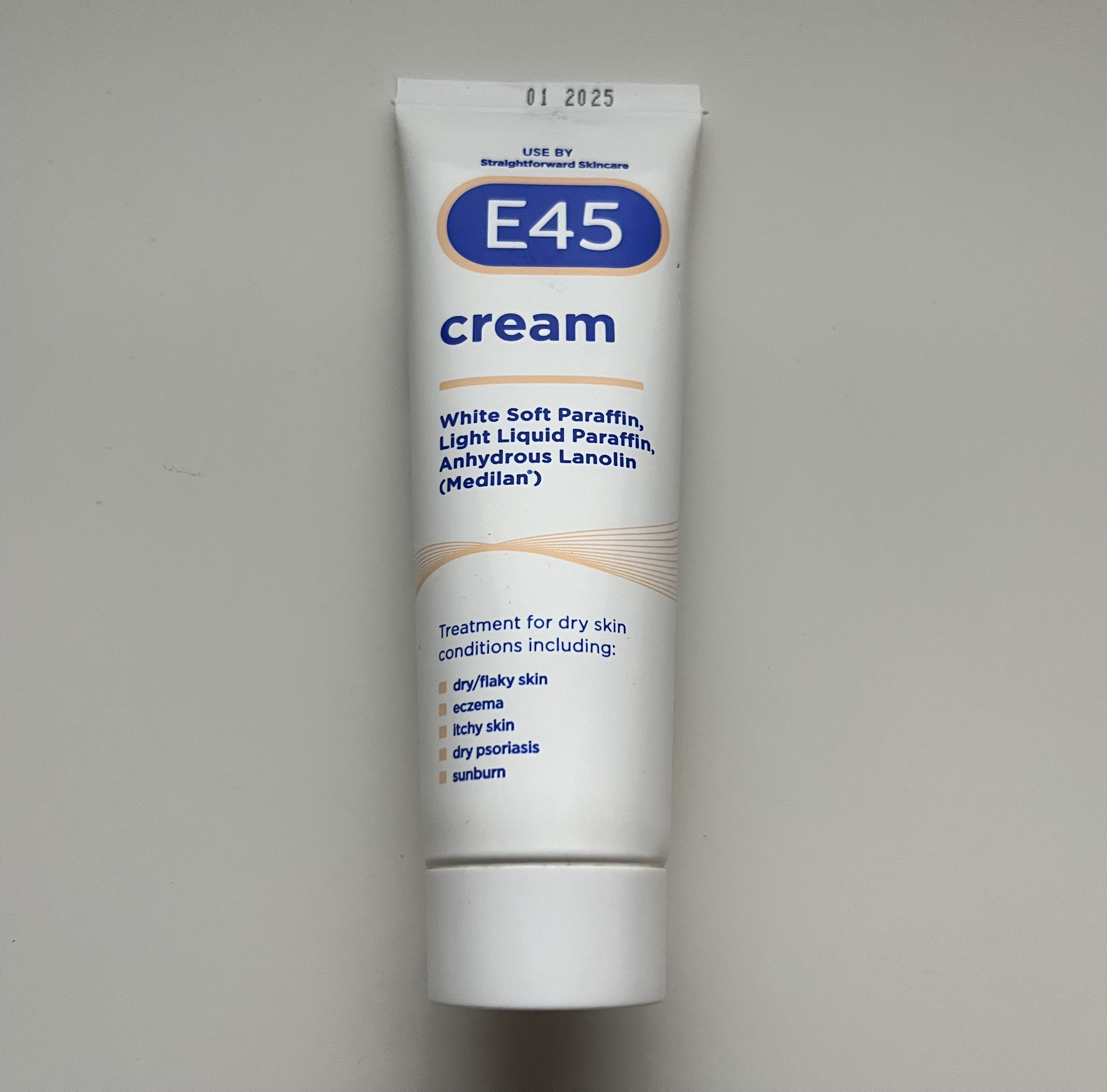
Bottle of E45 cream

E45 cream is a skin care product created in 1952 and currently marketed by Karo Pharma. It is a moisturizer. Its active ingredients are lanolin, white soft paraffin and liquid paraffin.

E45 was initially only available in hospitals, but was later made available for retail. The brand belonged to Crookes Healthcare, a subsidiary of the Reckitt group, until it was sold to Karo Pharma in April 2022.

== Properties ==
E45 prevents moisture escaping from the skin. Paraffin creates a breathable and hypoallergenic layer over damaged skin to protect it from potential irritants whilst lanolin heals and softens the epidermis.

The effectiveness of E45 doubles when applied on skin that is still slightly damp.

In 2016 it was one of the biggest selling branded over-the-counter medications sold in Great Britain, with sales of £35.5 million.

The product contains paraffin (a fire accelerant) and can generate fire risks. It has been associated with deaths from fire and, from 2017, was set to carry a flammability warning.

E45 cream contains the following:

Active ingredients	Measure
Anhydrous lanolin (Medilan)	1.0%w/w
White soft paraffin	14.5%w/w
Light liquid paraffin	12.6%w/w
Additional ingredients
Glycerol monostearate
Cetyl alcohol
Sodium cetostearyl sulphate
Carbomer
Methyl hydroxybenzoate (E218)
Propyl hydroxybenzoate (E26)
Sodium hydroxide
Citric acid monohydrate
Purified water
