= Chinese Camp, California =

Chinese Camp
- Census-designated place
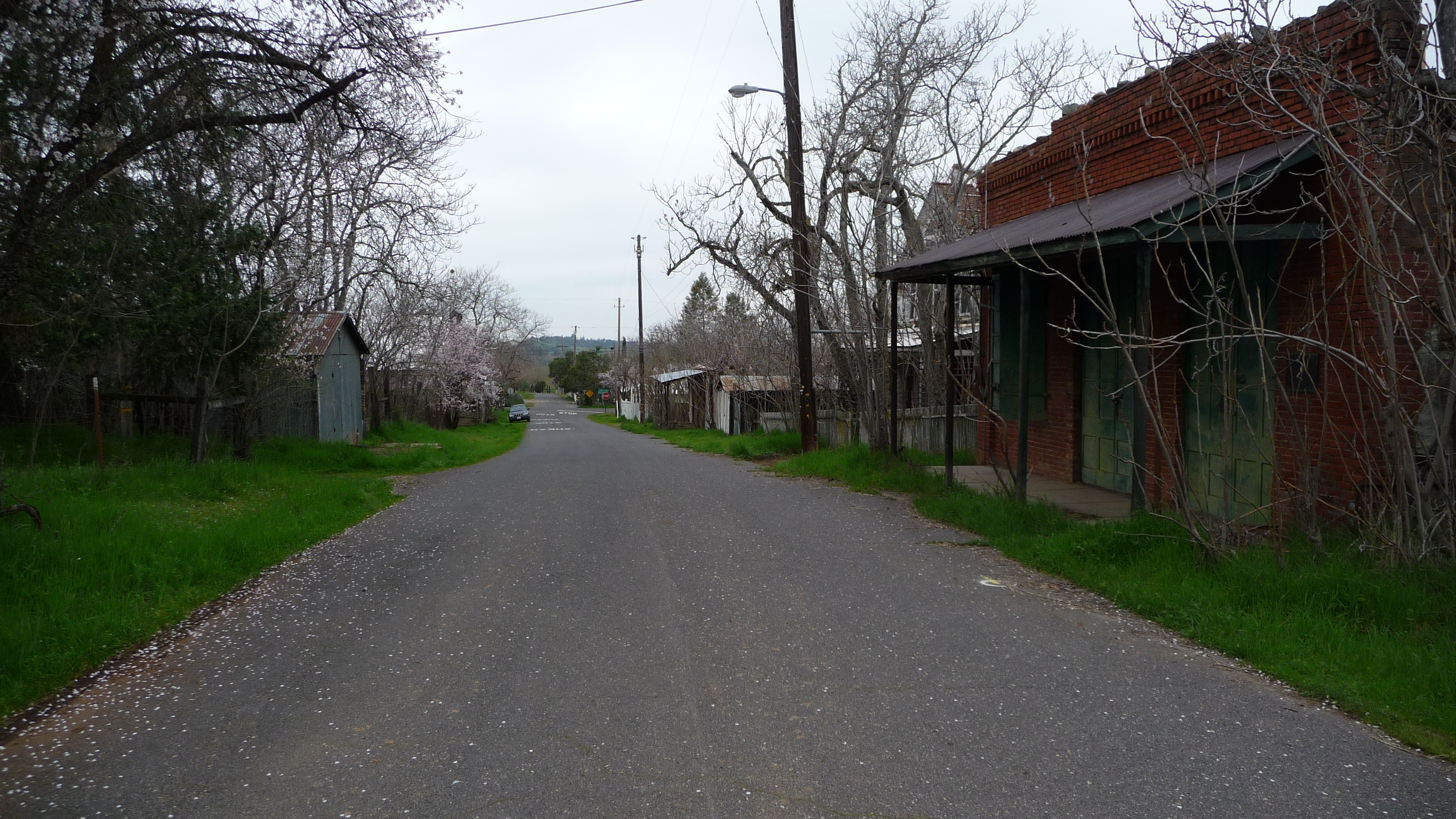
- Main Street, Chinese Camp

- Location in Tuolumne County and the state of California

- Location in the United States
- Coordinates: 37°52′23″N 120°26′39″W
- Country: United States
- State: California
- County: Tuolumne

Area
  - Total: 0.90 sq mi (2.33 km^{2})
  - Land: 0.90 sq mi (2.33 km^{2})
  - Water: 0.0039 sq mi (0.01 km^{2}) 0.28%
- Elevation: 1,201 ft (366 m)

Population (2020)
  - Total: 90
  - Density: 100/sq mi (38.7/km^{2})
- Time zone: UTC−08:00 (Pacific (PST))
  - Summer (DST): UTC−07:00 (PDT)
- ZIP Code: 95309
- Area code: 209
- FIPS code: 06-13182
- GNIS feature ID: 2408028

California Historical Landmark
- Reference no.: 423

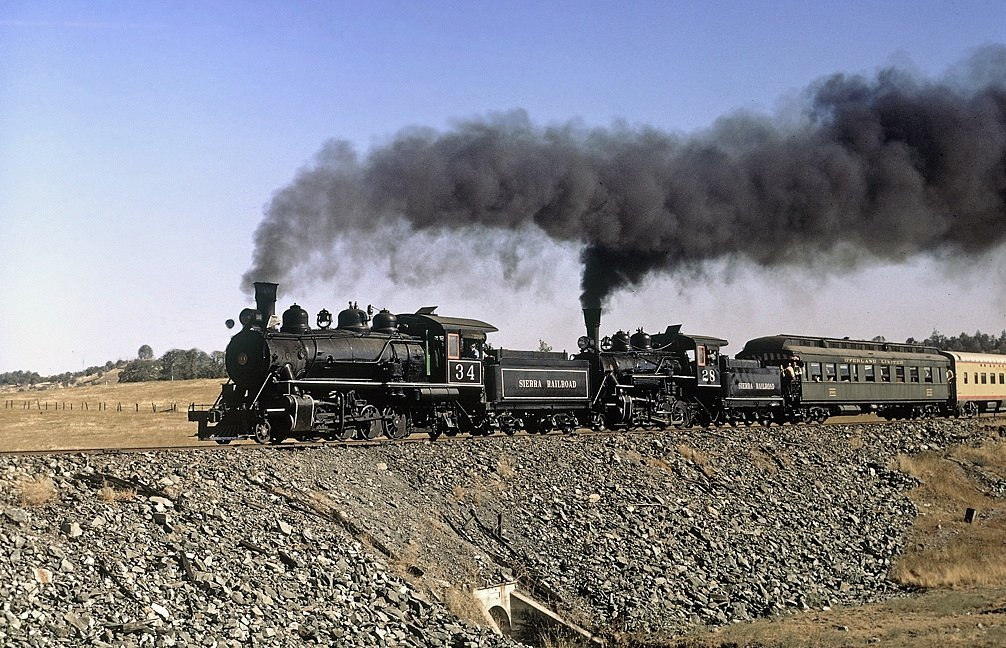
Sierra Railroad excursion train starts upgrade out of Chinese Camp, September 1971

Chinese Camp is a census-designated place (CDP) in Tuolumne County, California, United States. The population was 90 at the 2020 census, down from 126 at the 2010 census, which was down from 146 at the 2000 census. It lies in the grassy foothills of the Sierra Nevada near the southern end of California's Gold Country.

Chinese Camp is California Historical Landmark #423, since 1949.

== History ==
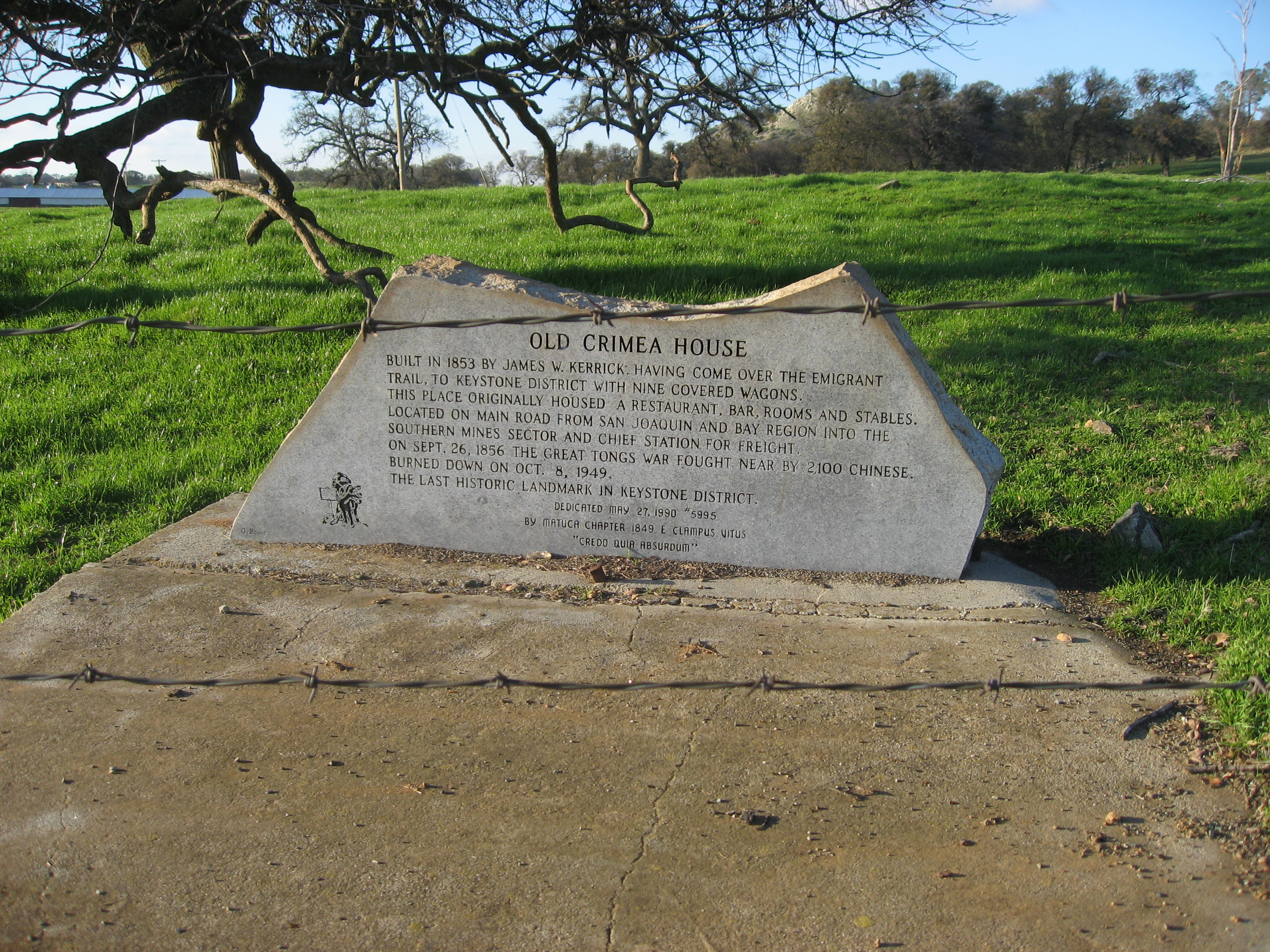
The site of the Old Crimea House. It was here where the First Tong War was fought.

Chinese Camp is the remnant of a notable California Gold Rush mining town. Between 1849 and 1882, thousands of Chinese immigrants arrived in the area to look for good fortune on the legendary "Gold Mountain".

The settlement was first known as "Camp Washington" or "Washingtonville" and one of the few remaining streets is Washington Street. Some of the first Chinese laborers arriving in California in 1849 were driven from neighboring Camp Salvado and resettled here, and the area started to become known as "Chinee" or "Chinese Camp" or "Chinese Diggings". At one point, the town was home to an estimated 5,000 Chinese people.

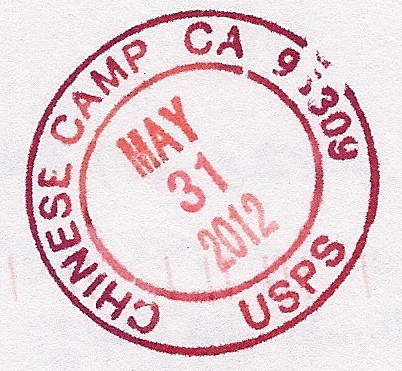
2012 postmark from Chinese Camp

The Chinese Camp post office was established in the general store on April 18, 1854.

An 1892 Tuolumne County history indicates that, in 1856, four of the six Chinese companies (protective associations) had agents here and that the first tong war (between the Sam Yap and Yan Woo tongs) was fought near here when the population of the area totaled several thousand. The actual location is several miles away, past the 'red hills', near the junction of Red Hills Road and J-59.

An 1860 diary says Chinese Camp was the metropolis for the mining district, with many urban comforts. While placer mining had played out in much of the Gold Country by the early 1860s, it was still active here as late as 1870. An 1899 mining bulletin listed the total gold production of the area as near US$2.5 million.

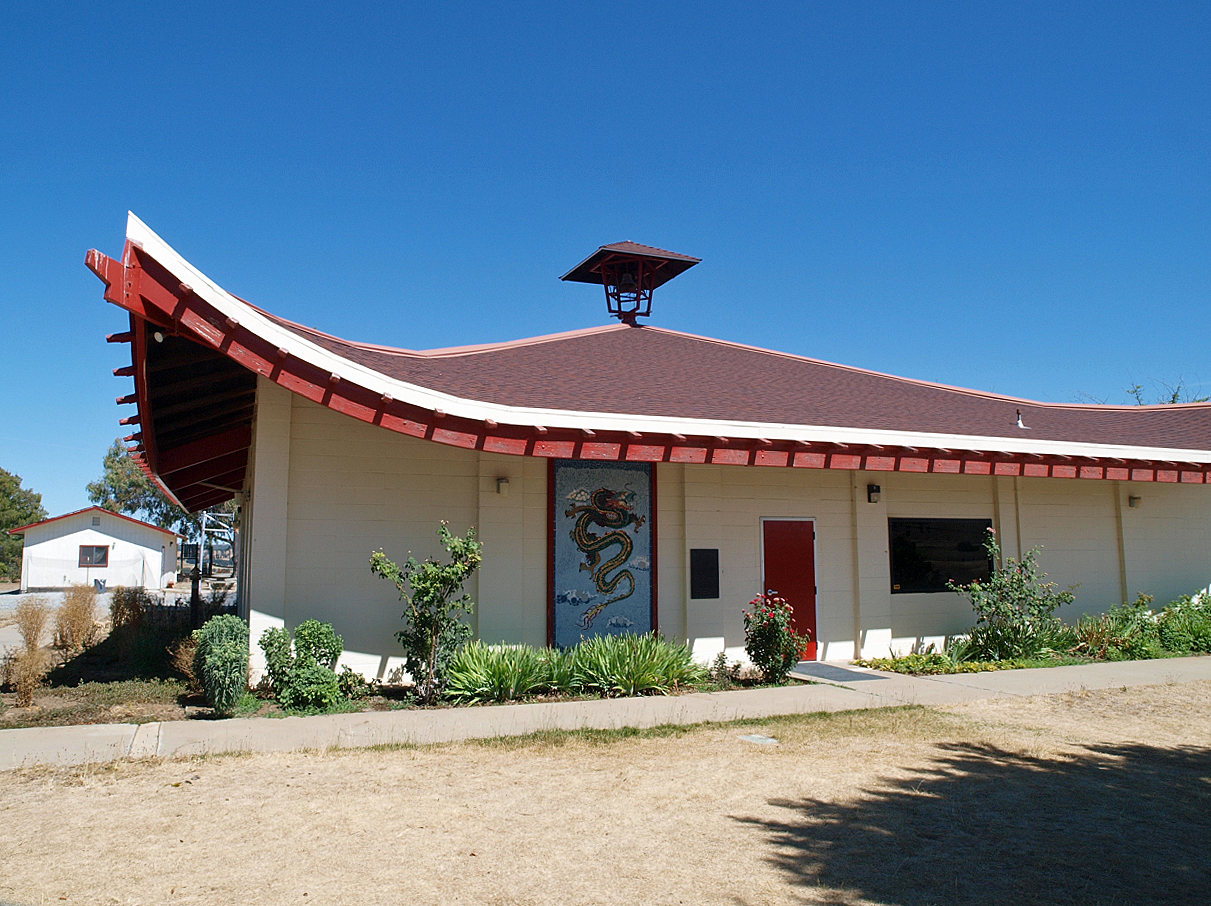
June 2014. The Chinese Camp, California Elementary School

Chinese Camp is the location and subject of California Historical Landmark #423, dedicated on March 4, 1949. The Saint Francis Xavier Roman Catholic Church, established in 1855, making it the oldest church in the county. The church was renovated in 1949 by John Nicolini but has since fallen into disrepair. The church itself is owned by the Stockton archdiocese.

The current Chinese Camp School is very distinctive, having been designed by Dolores Nicolini in the style of a Chinese pagoda. This school has been in operation since 1970. Previously, the school was in a building near the church. This building was lost in a fire on May 4, 2006.

A wildfire in the TCU September Lightning Complex led to the evacuation of Chinese Camp on September 2, 2025, and destroyed some buildings in the town, including the 1854 post office.

== Geography ==
According to the United States Census Bureau, the CDP has a total area of 0.9 square miles (2.3 km^{2}), of which 99.72% is land and 0.28% is water.

== Natural history ==
Wilderness near Chinese Camp is the location of the last remaining known population of the federally listed threatened plant species Brodiaea pallida, the Chinese Camp brodiaea.

== Demographics ==
Historical population
Census	Pop.	Note	%±
2000	146		—
2010	126		−13.7%
2020	90		−28.6%
U.S. Decennial Census; 1850–1870 1880-1890; 1900 1910 1920; 1930 1940 1950; 1960 1970 1980; 1990 2000 2010

Chinese Camp first appeared as a census designated place in the 2000 U.S. census.

=== Racial and ethnic composition ===
Chinese Camp CDP, California – Racial and ethnic composition Note: the US Census treats Hispanic/Latino as an ethnic category. This table excludes Latinos from the racial categories and assigns them to a separate category. Hispanics/Latinos may be of any race.
Race / Ethnicity (NH = Non-Hispanic)	Pop 2000	Pop 2010	Pop 2020	% 2000	% 2010	% 2020
White alone (NH)	119	88	73	81.51%	69.84%	81.11%
Black or African American alone (NH)	2	0	3	1.37%	0.00%	3.33%
Native American or Alaska Native alone (NH)	5	7	0	3.42%	5.56%	0.00%
Asian alone (NH)	1	0	0	0.68%	0.00%	0.00%
Native Hawaiian or Pacific Islander alone (NH)	0	0	0	0.00%	0.00%	0.00%
Other race alone (NH)	0	0	0	0.00%	0.00%	0.00%
Mixed race or Multiracial (NH)	2	6	5	1.37%	4.76%	5.56%
Hispanic or Latino (any race)	17	25	9	11.64%	19.84%	10.00%
Total	146	126	90	100.00%	100.00%	100.00%

=== 2020 census ===
As of the 2020 census, Chinese Camp had a population of 90. The median age was 41.5 years. 21.1% of residents were under the age of 18 and 28.9% of residents were 65 years of age or older. For every 100 females there were 95.7 males, and for every 100 females age 18 and over there were 77.5 males age 18 and over.

0.0% of residents lived in urban areas, while 100.0% lived in rural areas.

There were 45 households in Chinese Camp, of which 13.3% had children under the age of 18 living in them. Of all households, 28.9% were married-couple households, 35.6% were households with a male householder and no spouse or partner present, and 24.4% were households with a female householder and no spouse or partner present. About 28.9% of all households were made up of individuals and 8.9% had someone living alone who was 65 years of age or older.

There were 52 housing units, of which 13.5% were vacant. The homeowner vacancy rate was 0.0% and the rental vacancy rate was 0.0%.

Racial composition as of the 2020 census
Race	Number	Percent
White	74	82.2%
Black or African American	3	3.3%
American Indian and Alaska Native	0	0.0%
Asian	0	0.0%
Native Hawaiian and Other Pacific Islander	0	0.0%
Some other race	6	6.7%
Two or more races	7	7.8%

=== 2010 census ===
At the 2010 census Chinese Camp had a population of 126. The population density was 139.9 inhabitants per square mile (54.0/km^{2}). The racial makeup of Chinese Camp was 92 (73%) White, 0 African American, 7 (6%) Native American, 0 Asian, 0 Pacific Islander, 16 (13%) from other races, and 11 (9%) from two or more races. Hispanic or Latino of any race were 25 people (20%).

The whole population lived in households, no one lived in non-institutionalized group quarters and no one was institutionalized. 0 lived in non-institutionalized group quarters, and 0 were institutionalized.

There were 50 households, 15 (30%) had children under the age of 18 living in them, 23 (46%) were opposite-sex married couples living together, 2 (4%) had a female householder with no husband present, 6 (12%) had a male householder with no wife present. There were 5 (10%) unmarried opposite-sex partnerships, and 1 (2%) same-sex married couples or partnerships. 15 households (30%) were one person and 6 (12%) had someone living alone who was 65 or older. The average household size was 2.5. There were 31 families (62% of households); the average family size was 3.2.

The age distribution was 30 people (24%) under the age of 18, 11 people (9%) aged 18 to 24, 24 people (19%) aged 25 to 44, 46 people (37%) aged 45 to 64, and 15 people (12%) who were 65 or older. The median age was 43.5 years. For every 100 females, there were 106.6 males. For every 100 females age 18 and over, there were 108.7 males.

There were 60 housing units at an average density of 66.6 per square mile, of the occupied units 36 (72.0%) were owner-occupied and 14 (28.0%) were rented. The homeowner vacancy rate was 3%; the rental vacancy rate was 0%. 99 people (79% of the population) lived in owner-occupied housing units and 27 people (21%) lived in rental housing units.

=== 2000 census ===
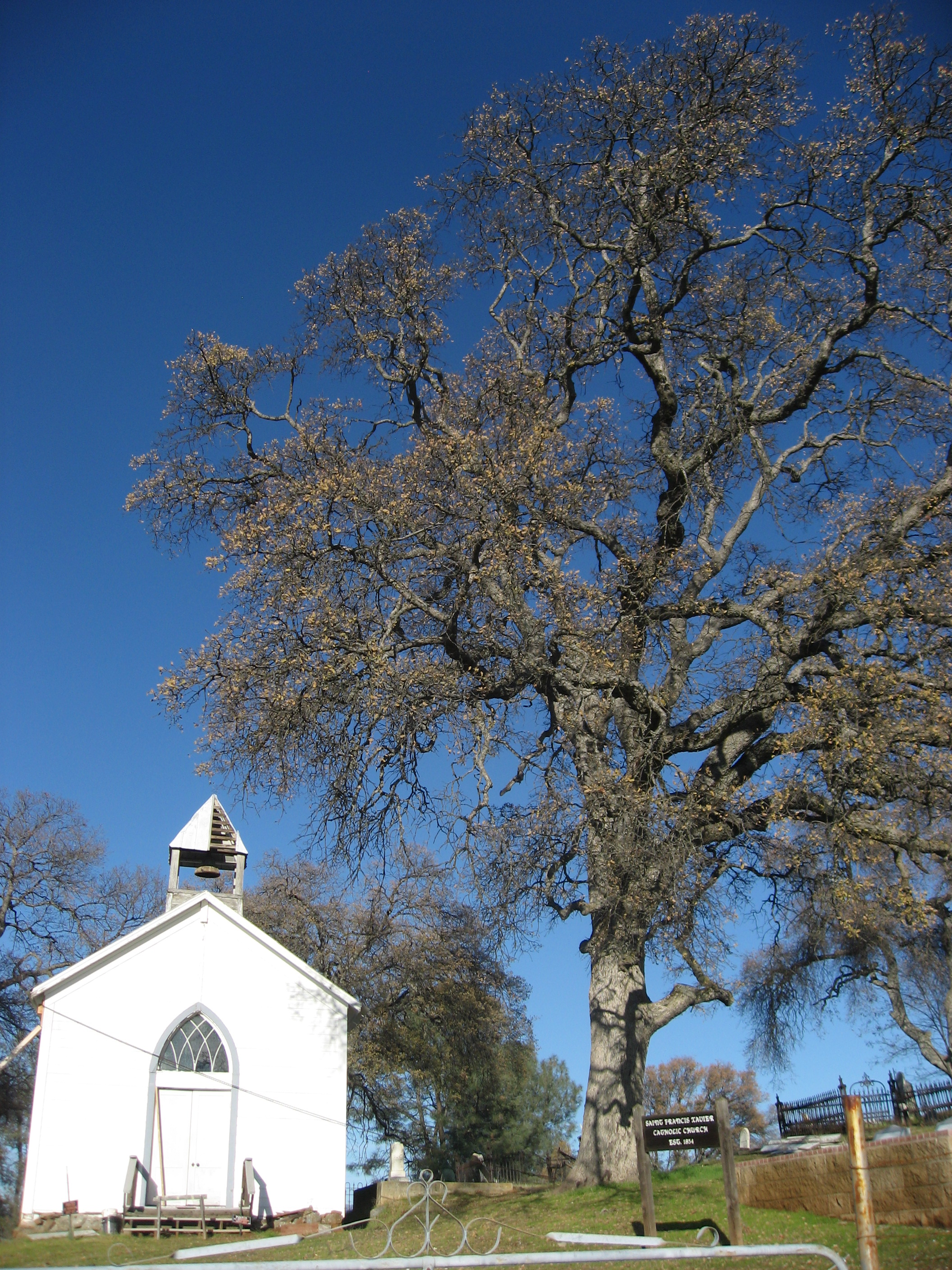
The old Catholic Church. There is a chain across the front to hold it up.

At the 2000 census there were 146 people, 57 households, and 38 families in the CDP. The population density was 162.5 inhabitants per square mile (62.7/km^{2}). There were 64 housing units at an average density of 71.2 units per square mile (27.5 units/km^{2}). The racial makeup of the CDP was 92% White, 1% African American, 3% Native American, 1% Asian, 1% from other races, and 2% from two or more races. Hispanic or Latino of any race were 12%.

Of the 57 households 32% had children under the age of 18 living with them, 54% were married couples living together, 12% had a female householder with no husband present, and 32% were non-families. 30% of households were one person and 9% were one person aged 65 or older. The average household size was 2.6 and the average family size was 3.2.

The age distribution was 28% under the age of 18, 10% from 18 to 24, 32% from 25 to 44, 20% from 45 to 64, and 10% 65 or older. The median age was 35 years. For every 100 females, there were 117.9 males. For every 100 females age 18 and over, there were 110.0 males.

The median household income was $31,875 and the median family income was $35,833. Males had a median income of $25,833 versus $18,750 for females. The per capita income for the CDP was $11,501. There were 21% of families and 23% of the population living below the poverty line, including 36% of under eighteens and 14% of those over 64.

== Government ==
In the California State Legislature, Chinese Camp is in the 4th senatorial district, represented by Republican Marie Alvarado-Gil, and the 8th Assembly district, represented by Republican David Tangipa.

In the United States House of Representatives, Chinese Camp is in California's 5th congressional district, represented by Republican Tom McClintock.

== Tungsten mine ==
Montezuma just north of Chinese Camp is a California Historical Landmark. The Montezuma is a current tungsten mine at an elevation of 1,439 feet.

A marker is on California State Route 49, the California Historical Landmark number 122 reads:

NO. 122 MONTEZUMA - First record of Montezuma was June 1850 when partners Solomon Miller and Peter K. Aurand, proprietors of the 'Montezuma Tent,' were attacked and Aurand killed by a group of Mexicans during the foreign miners tax excitement of that period. Due to the lack of water, little mining occurred here until 1852 when a ditch and flume were completed bringing water for placer mining. Two types of mining were carried on, placer operations on the flats and tunnels extending under Table Mountain. The gravel produced 3-1/2 C. per pan in the mid 50s. The yield was from $5 to $10 per day. One placer nugget found in 1853 weighed 18 lbs. 8 oz. By late 1852 the population was about 800. At its zenith Montezuma City had four saloons, two hotels, Adams Express Co., post office, church, some homes, and many tents and cabins. The town was nearly destroyed by an incendiary fire which started in Clarks Hotel on June 29, 1866.

== See also ==
- California Historical Landmarks in Tuolumne County, California
- Wells Fargo Express Company Building (Chinese Camp, California)
