= Groveland/Yosemite Airport =

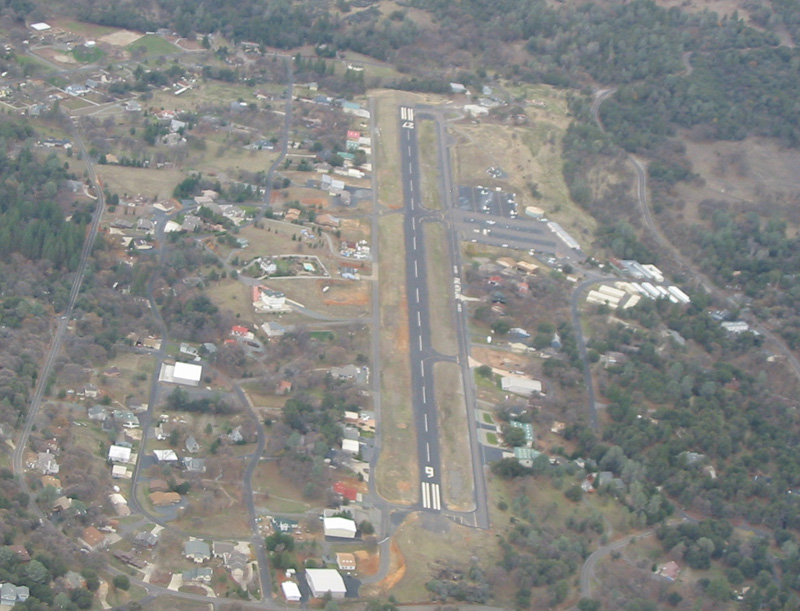
- IATA: none; ICAO: none; FAA LID: E45

Summary
- Airport type: Tuolumne County
- Operator: Groveland, California
- Elevation AMSL: 2,930 ft (890 m)
- Coordinates: 37°51′42″N 120°10′40″W
- Interactive map of Groveland/Yosemite Airport

Runways
Direction	Length		Surface
Direction	ft	m	Surface
9/27	3,625	1,105	Asphalt

Groveland/Yosemite Airport (FAA LID: E45), formerly named Pine Mountain Lake Airport and formerly Q68 before that, is a public airport located three miles (4.8 km) northeast of Groveland, serving Tuolumne County, California, United States. It is used mostly for general aviation, and has public access. The airport is part of the Pine Mountain Lake community.

== Facilities ==
Groveland/Yosemite Airport covers 52 acres and has one runway:

- Runway 9/27: 3,625 x 50 ft (1,105 x 15 m), surface: asphalt
- Fuel - 24-hour self-service
- Parking tie-downs
- Air-frame service
- Power-plant service

Cautions to pilots: "Be alert, deer on and in vicinity of airport especially Nov.-Apr."

== Past airline service ==
The Groveland/Yosemite Airport (then known as Pine Mountain Lake Airport) was served during the late 1970s and early 1980s by Yosemite Airlines, a commuter air carrier based in Columbia, CA which operated small Cessna prop aircraft with scheduled passenger flights between the airport and San Francisco International Airport (SFO), Oakland International Airport (OAK) and Sacramento International Airport (SMF). The airport was listed in the Official Airline Guide (OAG) as "Yosemite National Park" although Yosemite Valley in the national park is located approximately 46 miles east of the airfield via California State Route 120.

== Name Change ==
In January 2026, the name of the airport was changed from Pine Mountain Lake Airport to Groveland/Yosemite Airport. This was done for two primary reasons. First, to reinforce that this is a public-use airport and not private to the Pine Mountain Lake HOA. Second, to better associate the airport with Yosemite, since it serves as a convenient access to nearby Yosemite.
