= Groveland, California =

Census-designated place in Tuolumne County, California

Groveland
- Census-designated place
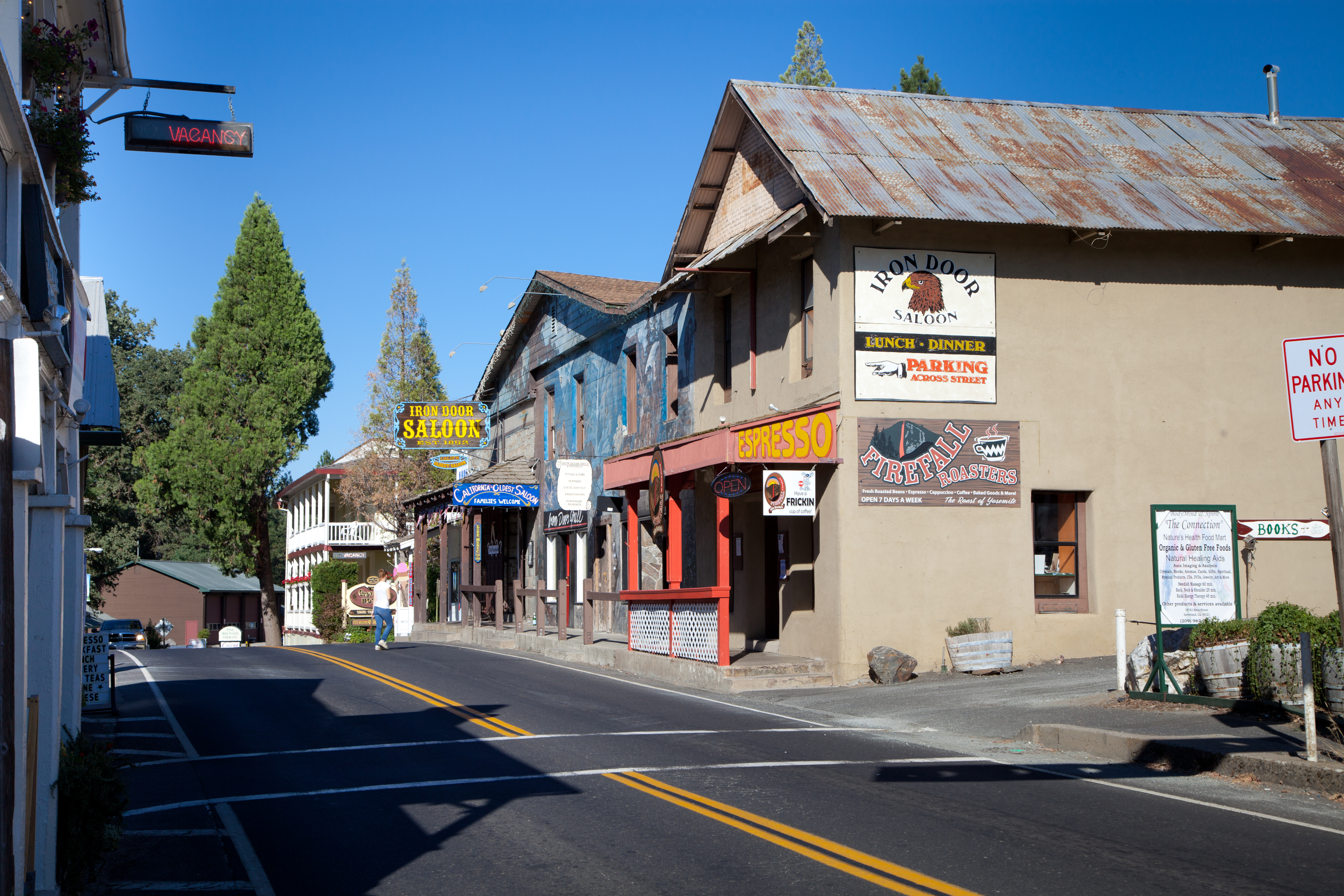
- Groveland historic district, 2012

- Location of Groveland in Tuolumne County and California

- Location in California
- Coordinates: 37°49′54″N 120°15′12″W
- Country: United States
- State: California
- County: Tuolumne

Area
  - Total: 9.579 sq mi (24.81 km^{2})
  - Land: 9.574 sq mi (24.80 km^{2})
  - Water: 0.006 sq mi (0.016 km^{2})
- Elevation: 3,064 ft (934 m)

Population (2020)
  - Total: 540
  - Density: 56/sq mi (22/km^{2})
- Time zone: UTC-8 (Pacific)
  - Summer (DST): UTC-7 (PDT)
- ZIP code: 95321
- Area code: 209
- GNIS feature ID: 2628856

California Historical Landmark
- Official name: Groveland (Formerly Garrote)
- Reference no.: 446

Groveland is a census-designated place (CDP) in Tuolumne County, California, United States. The 2020 United States census reported Groveland's population as 540.

Groveland was created as a CDP prior to the 2010 census; previously it was part of Groveland-Big Oak Flat CDP.

== History ==
Groveland has always been an important stop on the highway to Yosemite but really grew in the early 1900s with the development of the Tuolumne River Hetch-Hetchy water project for the city of San Francisco. Groveland is adjacent to the Stanislaus National Forest and is known for the historic Iron Door Saloon.

Groveland was originally a gold rush town and then became a sleepy farming community until the San Francisco Hetch Hetchy water project made it their headquarters and built a railroad yard and hospital for the work crews (both now gone). From 1915 till 1935, Groveland was a boom town supporting seven hotels, 10,000 residents and much activity. When the work crews left, the town again became a minor stop on the way to Yosemite until the Boise Cascade company built the Pine Mountain Lake community with a first class golf course, an airport and lake and staked out 5,000 lots. This development has since grown from a summer home area to a retirement community to a thriving neighborhood with year-round families, boosting the once sleepy Groveland to a travel and vacation destination in its own right.

== Geography ==
According to the United States Census Bureau, the CDP covers 9.579 square miles (24.81 km^{2}), of which 9.574 square miles (24.80 km^{2}) is land and 0.006 square miles (0.016 km^{2}) is water.

=== Climate ===
This region experiences warm to very hot and dry summers, with the hottest month having an average temperature of 73.7 °F. According to the Köppen Climate Classification system, Groveland has a hot-summer Mediterranean climate, abbreviated "Csa."

Climate data for Groveland, California, 1991–2020 normals, extremes 1908–1916, 2000–present
Month	Jan	Feb	Mar	Apr	May	Jun	Jul	Aug	Sep	Oct	Nov	Dec	Year
Record high °F (°C)	72 (22)	84 (29)	87 (31)	87 (31)	97 (36)	104 (40)	107 (42)	105 (41)	108 (42)	97 (36)	87 (31)	75 (24)	108 (42)
Mean maximum °F (°C)	66.6 (19.2)	69.8 (21.0)	74.5 (23.6)	81.7 (27.6)	88.5 (31.4)	98.6 (37.0)	101.1 (38.4)	99.7 (37.6)	96.9 (36.1)	86.5 (30.3)	77.0 (25.0)	64.9 (18.3)	102.1 (38.9)
Mean daily maximum °F (°C)	53.4 (11.9)	55.3 (12.9)	60.1 (15.6)	64.8 (18.2)	73.2 (22.9)	83.2 (28.4)	91.2 (32.9)	90.7 (32.6)	84.7 (29.3)	73.5 (23.1)	60.1 (15.6)	52.0 (11.1)	70.2 (21.2)
Daily mean °F (°C)	42.2 (5.7)	43.5 (6.4)	47.5 (8.6)	51.4 (10.8)	58.6 (14.8)	67.0 (19.4)	73.7 (23.2)	72.8 (22.7)	67.3 (19.6)	57.7 (14.3)	47.6 (8.7)	41.4 (5.2)	55.9 (13.3)
Mean daily minimum °F (°C)	31.0 (−0.6)	31.7 (−0.2)	34.8 (1.6)	38.1 (3.4)	44.0 (6.7)	50.9 (10.5)	56.3 (13.5)	54.9 (12.7)	49.9 (9.9)	41.8 (5.4)	35.1 (1.7)	30.7 (−0.7)	41.6 (5.3)
Mean minimum °F (°C)	20.9 (−6.2)	21.9 (−5.6)	24.7 (−4.1)	28.4 (−2.0)	33.7 (0.9)	39.0 (3.9)	47.9 (8.8)	47.1 (8.4)	38.3 (3.5)	31.4 (−0.3)	25.5 (−3.6)	19.1 (−7.2)	17.3 (−8.2)
Record low °F (°C)	−2 (−19)	8 (−13)	12 (−11)	23 (−5)	23 (−5)	33 (1)	37 (3)	40 (4)	32 (0)	26 (−3)	19 (−7)	7 (−14)	−2 (−19)
Average precipitation inches (mm)	7.20 (183)	6.93 (176)	6.29 (160)	2.98 (76)	2.24 (57)	0.39 (9.9)	0.00 (0.00)	0.09 (2.3)	0.30 (7.6)	2.13 (54)	3.50 (89)	6.61 (168)	38.66 (982.8)
Average snowfall inches (cm)	1.3 (3.3)	2.3 (5.8)	2.6 (6.6)	0.8 (2.0)	0.0 (0.0)	0.0 (0.0)	0.0 (0.0)	0.0 (0.0)	0.0 (0.0)	0.0 (0.0)	0.7 (1.8)	1.7 (4.3)	9.4 (23.8)
Average precipitation days (≥ 0.01 in)	9.9	8.5	10.5	7.2	4.1	0.9	0.3	0.6	1.6	3.9	8.0	10.1	65.6
Average snowy days (≥ 0.1 in)	0.3	0.5	0.5	0.3	0.0	0.0	0.0	0.0	0.0	0.0	0.4	0.2	2.2
Source 1: NOAA
Source 2: National Weather Service (mean maxima/minima 2006–2020)

== Demographics ==
Historical population
Census	Pop.	Note	%±
2010	601		—
2020	540		−10.1%
U.S. Decennial Census; 1850–1870 1880-1890; 1900 1910 1920; 1930 1940 1950; 1960 1970 1980; 1990

2000 2010

Groveland first appeared as a census designated place in the 2010 U.S. census formed from part of deleted Groveland-Big Oak Flat CDP and additional area.

=== Racial and ethnic composition ===
Groveland CDP, California – Racial and ethnic composition Note: the US Census treats Hispanic/Latino as an ethnic category. This table excludes Latinos from the racial categories and assigns them to a separate category. Hispanics/Latinos may be of any race.
Race / Ethnicity (NH = Non-Hispanic)	Pop 2010	Pop 2020	% 2010	% 2020
White alone (NH)	521	441	86.69%	81.67%
Black or African American alone (NH)	2	1	0.33%	0.19%
Native American or Alaska Native alone (NH)	5	4	0.83%	0.74%
Asian alone (NH)	8	3	1.33%	0.56%
Native Hawaiian or Pacific Islander alone (NH)	1	0	0.17%	0.00%
Other race alone (NH)	0	1	0.00%	0.19%
Mixed race or Multiracial (NH)	15	46	2.50%	8.52%
Hispanic or Latino (any race)	49	44	8.15%	8.15%
Total	601	540	100.00%	100.00%

=== 2020 census ===
The 2020 United States census reported that Groveland had a population of 540. The population density was 56.4 inhabitants per square mile (21.8/km^{2}). The racial makeup of Groveland was 458 (84.8%) White, 1 (0.2%) African American, 9 (1.7%) Native American, 3 (0.6%) Asian, 0 (0.0%) Pacific Islander, 11 (2.0%) from other races, and 58 (10.7%) from two or more races. Hispanic or Latino of any race were 44 persons (8.1%).

The whole population lived in households. There were 245 households, out of which 44 (18.0%) had children under the age of 18 living in them, 87 (35.5%) were married-couple households, 25 (10.2%) were cohabiting couple households, 68 (27.8%) had a female householder with no partner present, and 65 (26.5%) had a male householder with no partner present. 90 households (36.7%) were one person, and 46 (18.8%) were one person aged 65 or older. The average household size was 2.2. There were 136 families (55.5% of all households).

The age distribution was 96 people (17.8%) under the age of 18, 36 people (6.7%) aged 18 to 24, 125 people (23.1%) aged 25 to 44, 133 people (24.6%) aged 45 to 64, and 150 people (27.8%) who were 65 years of age or older. The median age was 46.8 years. For every 100 females, there were 122.2 males.

There were 321 housing units at an average density of 33.5 units per square mile (12.9 units/km^{2}), of which 245 (76.3%) were occupied. Of these, 178 (72.7%) were owner-occupied, and 67 (27.3%) were occupied by renters.

== Parks and recreation ==
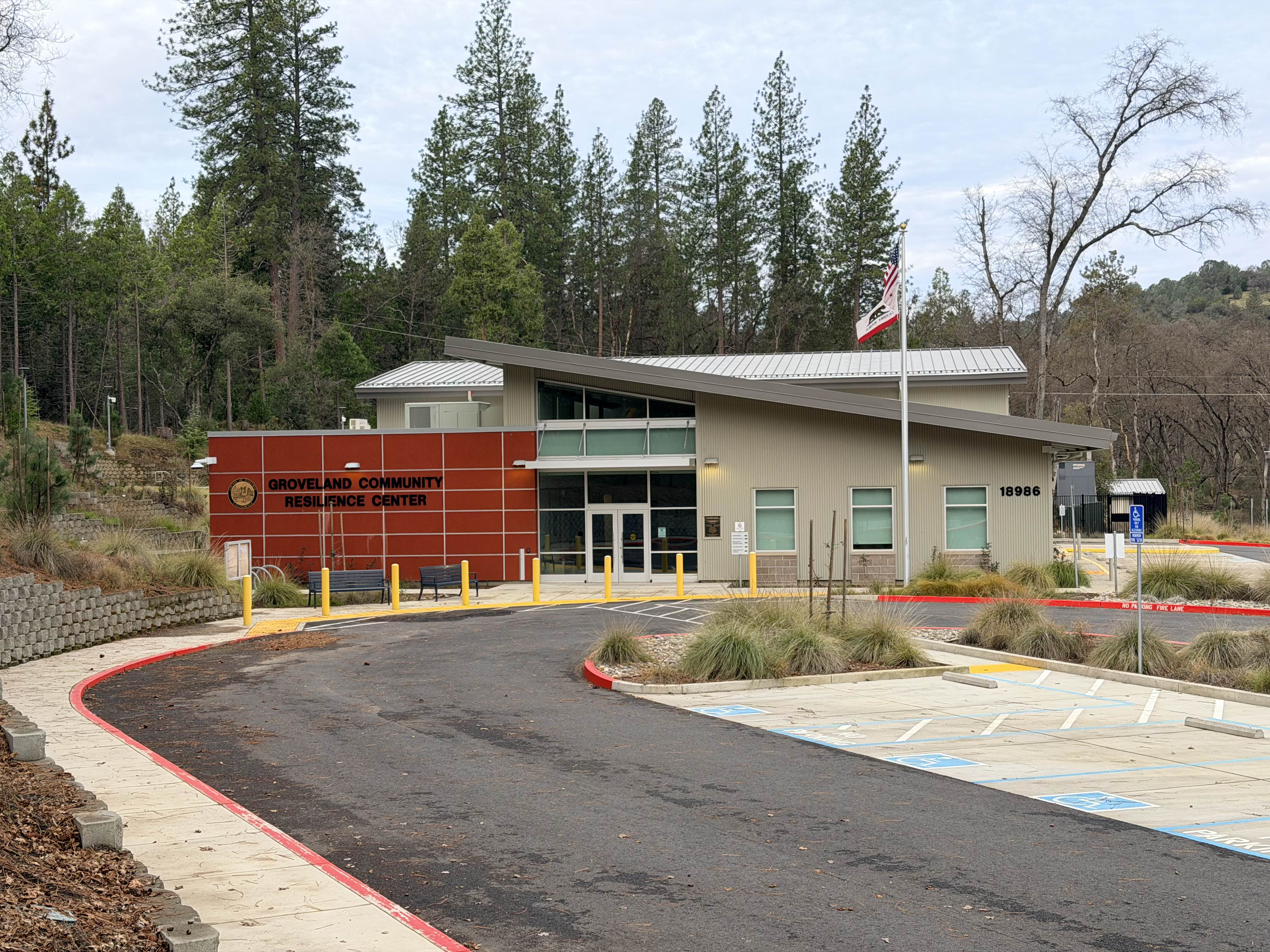
The Groveland Community Resilience Center, a multiuse community facility

The Groveland Ranger District of the Stanislaus National Forest, headquartered in Groveland, administers recreation lands in the surrounding area.

== Government ==
Camp Mather of the City of San Francisco, San Jose Family Camp of the City of San Jose, Berkeley Tuolumne Family Camp of the City of Berkeley, and Camp Tawonga, a Jewish summer camp, are all located east of Groveland off Hwy 120 within the Stanislaus National Forest.

== Education ==
The area is served by the Big Oak Flat-Groveland Unified School District, which operates Tenaya Elementary School (kindergarten through grade eight) and Tioga High School in Groveland, and Don Pedro High School in La Grange, across a 678 square miles (1,760 km^{2}) district following the Tuolumne River from the northern entrance of Yosemite National Park to the Lake Don Pedro area.

== Notable people ==
- Thoren Bradley

== See also ==
- Big Oak Flat, California
- Buck Meadows, California
- Groveland-Big Oak Flat, California
- Pine Mountain Lake, California
- California Historical Landmarks in Tuolumne County, California
