= Electra Peak =

Mountain in Yosemite National Park, USA

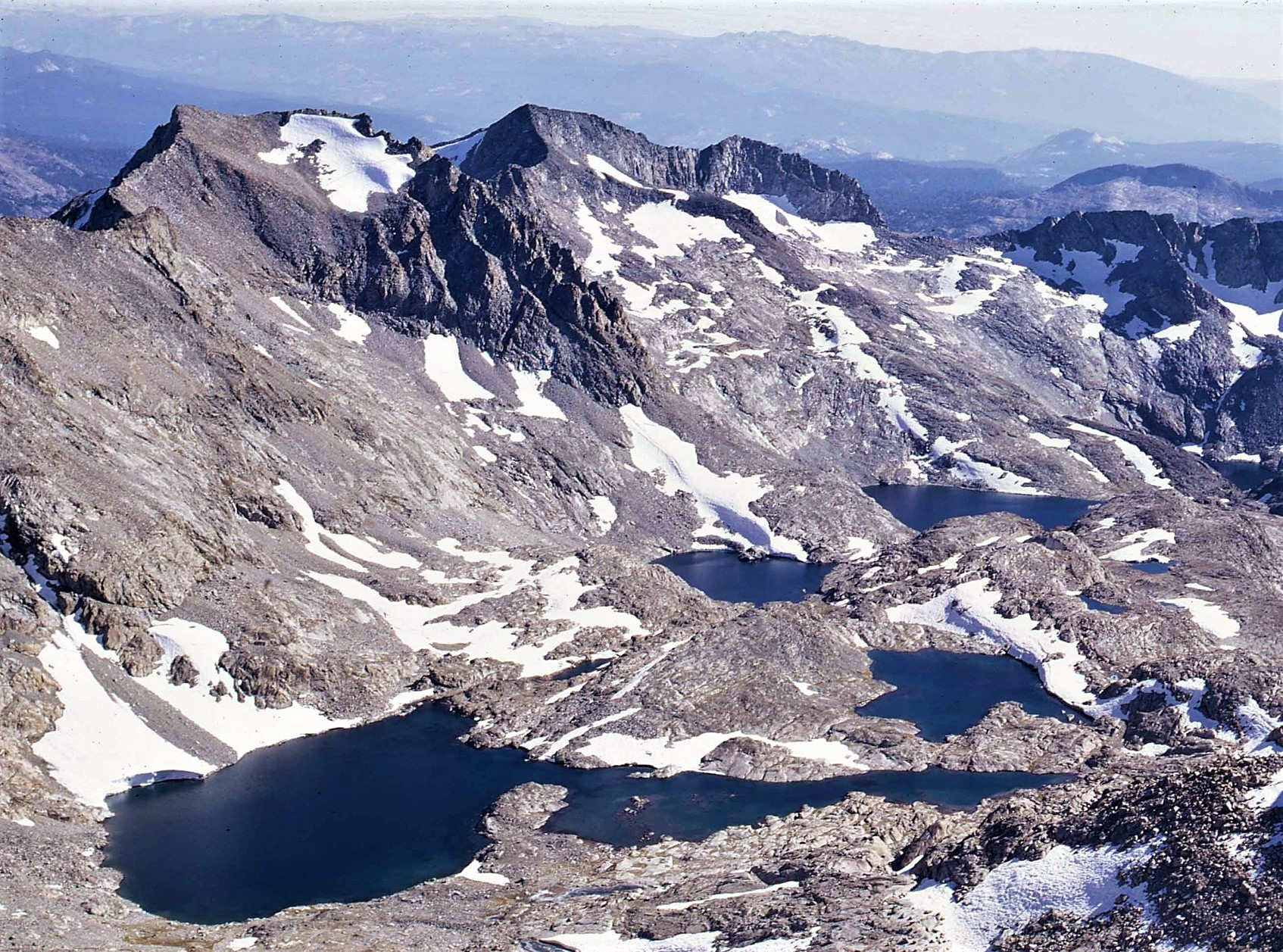
- North aspect (centered at top)

Highest point
- Elevation: 12,442 ft (3,792 m) NAVD 88
- Prominence: 322 ft (98 m)
- Coordinates: 37°42′18″N 119°15′37″W

Geography
- Location within California Location within the United States
- Location: Yosemite National Park, Tuolumne County, California, U.S.
- Parent range: Ritter Range, Sierra Nevada

Electra Peak is a mountain, broadly in the Tuolumne Meadows area of Yosemite National Park, if far, from the road. Electra Peak is the 14th highest mountain in Yosemite National Park.

Electra Peak may have been named for a play called Electra.

== On Electra Peak's particulars ==
Electra Peak is 1.5 miles (2.4 km) south of Rodgers Peak, and straddles the boundary of Yosemite National Park and Ansel Adams Wilderness. Banner Peak and Mount Ritter are to the east, the Mount Maclure-Mount Lyell-Rodgers Peak complex is to the north, and the Lyell Fork Merced River drainage is to the west. It is also near Matterhorn Peak, Foerster Peak, and Mount Ansel Adams. Both Mount Ritter and Banner Peak are also near.

From most directions, Electra Peak is a class 2 climb.
