= Iron Mountain (Madera County, California) =

Mountain in the American state of California

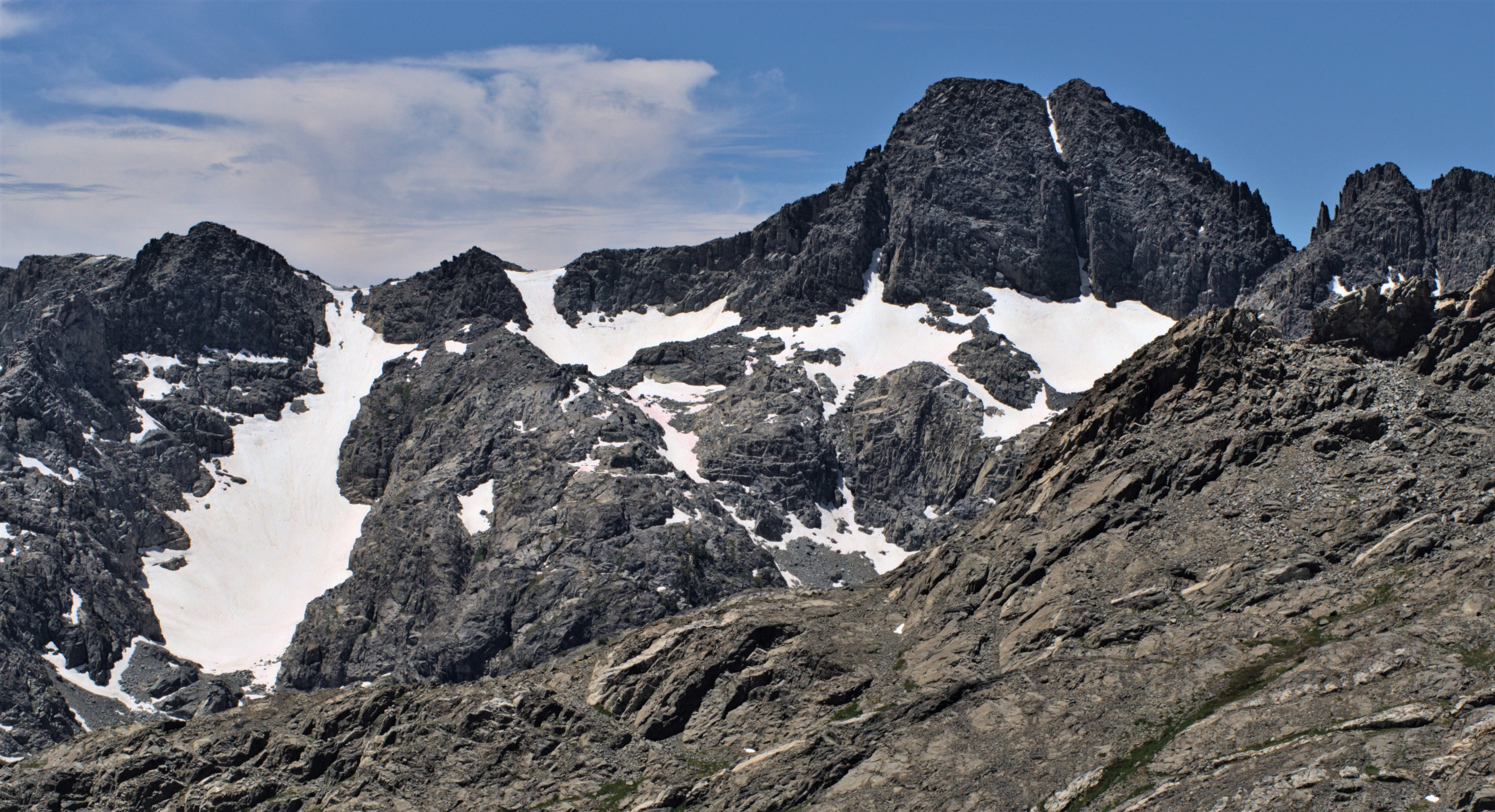
- North aspect

Highest point
- Elevation: 11,149 ft (3,398 m)
- Prominence: 748 ft (228 m)
- Parent peak: Starr Minaret (11,502 ft)
- Isolation: 2.79 mi (4.49 km)
- Listing: Sierra Peaks Section
- Coordinates: 37°36′41″N 119°09′53″W

Naming
- Etymology: Iron ore

Geography
- Location within California Location within the United States
- Location: Madera County, California, U.S.
- Parent range: Sierra Nevada; Ritter Range
- Topo map: USGS Cattle Mountain

Climbing
- Easiest route: class 2 South slope

Iron Mountain is an 11,149-foot-elevation (3,398-meter) summit located in the Sierra Nevada mountain range in Madera County of northern California, United States. It is situated in the Ansel Adams Wilderness, on the boundary shared by Inyo National Forest with Sierra National Forest. It is set at the south end of the Ritter Range, approximately 10 miles (16 km) west of the community of Mammoth Lakes. Devils Postpile National Monument is 4.5 miles to the east and the Minarets are three miles to the north. Precipitation runoff from the west side of this mountain drains to North Fork San Joaquin River, and from the east slope to the Middle Fork San Joaquin. Topographic relief is significant as the east aspect rises over 2,000 feet (610 meters) above Anona Lake in approximately one mile. There are climbing routes to the summit via the south slope and east face, and inclusion on the Sierra Peaks Section peakbagging list generates climbing interest.

== Etymology ==
The mountain's name is attributable to iron ore found on the west shoulder of the peak. The toponym was likely applied by the Wheeler Survey, and has been officially adopted by the U.S. Board on Geographic Names.

== Climate ==
According to the Köppen climate classification system, Iron Mountain is located in an alpine climate zone. Most weather fronts originate in the Pacific Ocean, and travel east toward the Sierra Nevada mountains. As fronts approach, they are forced upward by the peaks (orographic lift), causing them to drop their moisture in the form of rain or snowfall onto the range.

== See also ==
- Sierra Nevada
- Volcanic Ridge

== Gallery ==
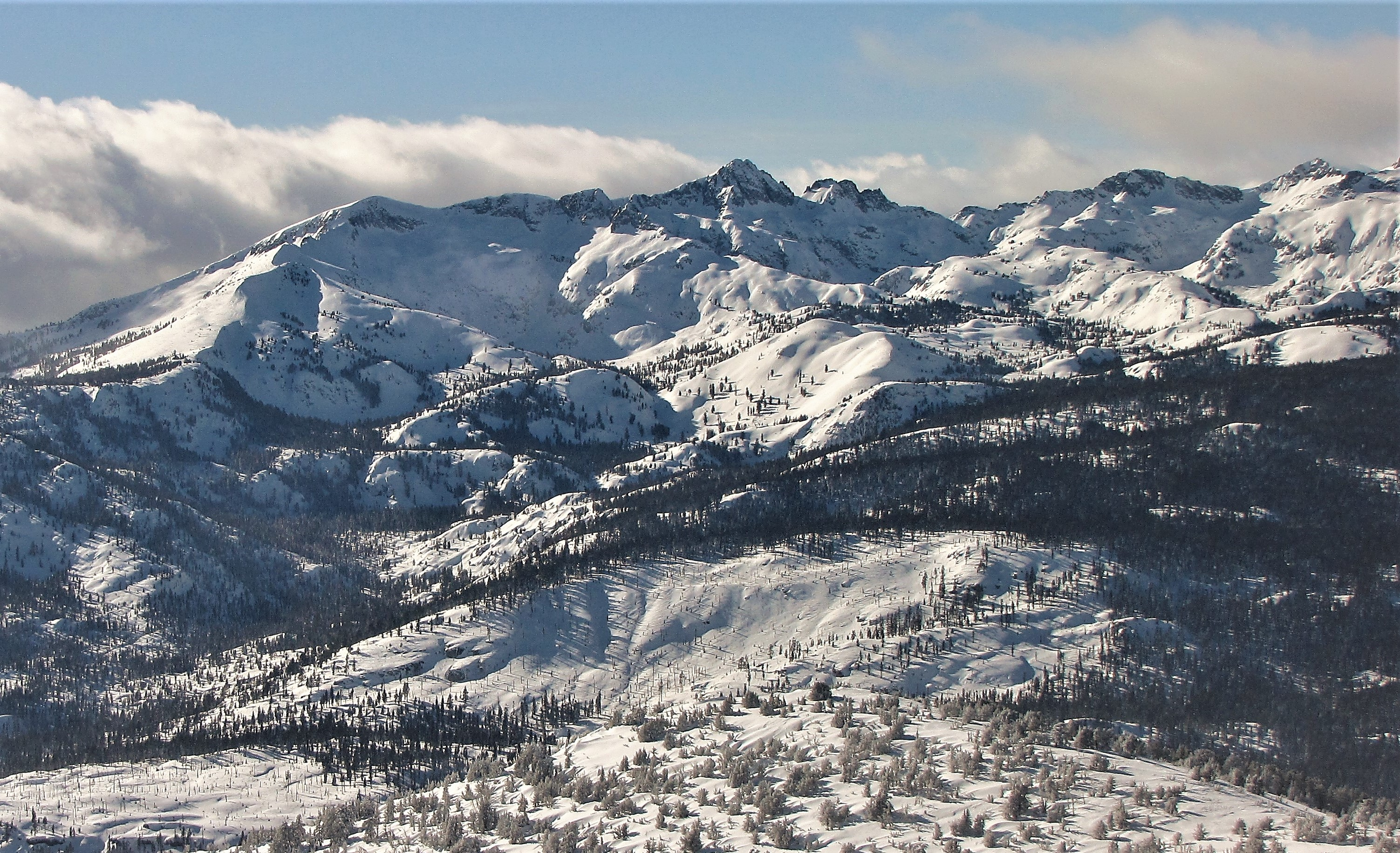
Iron Mountain's east aspect, seen from Mammoth Mountain.

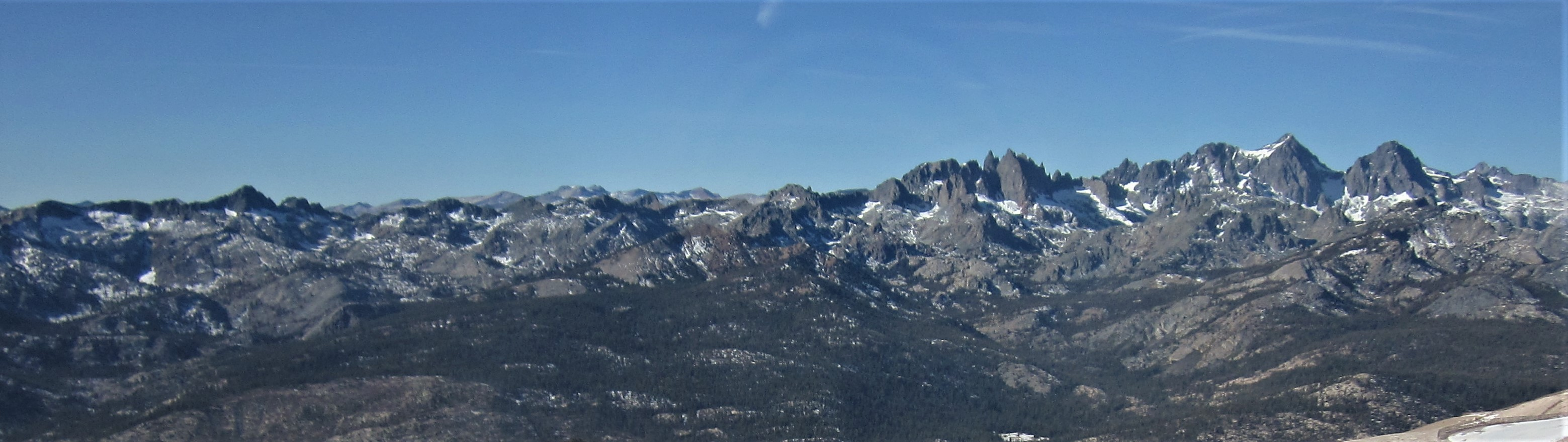
Ritter Range seen from Mammoth Mountain. Iron Mountain to left.

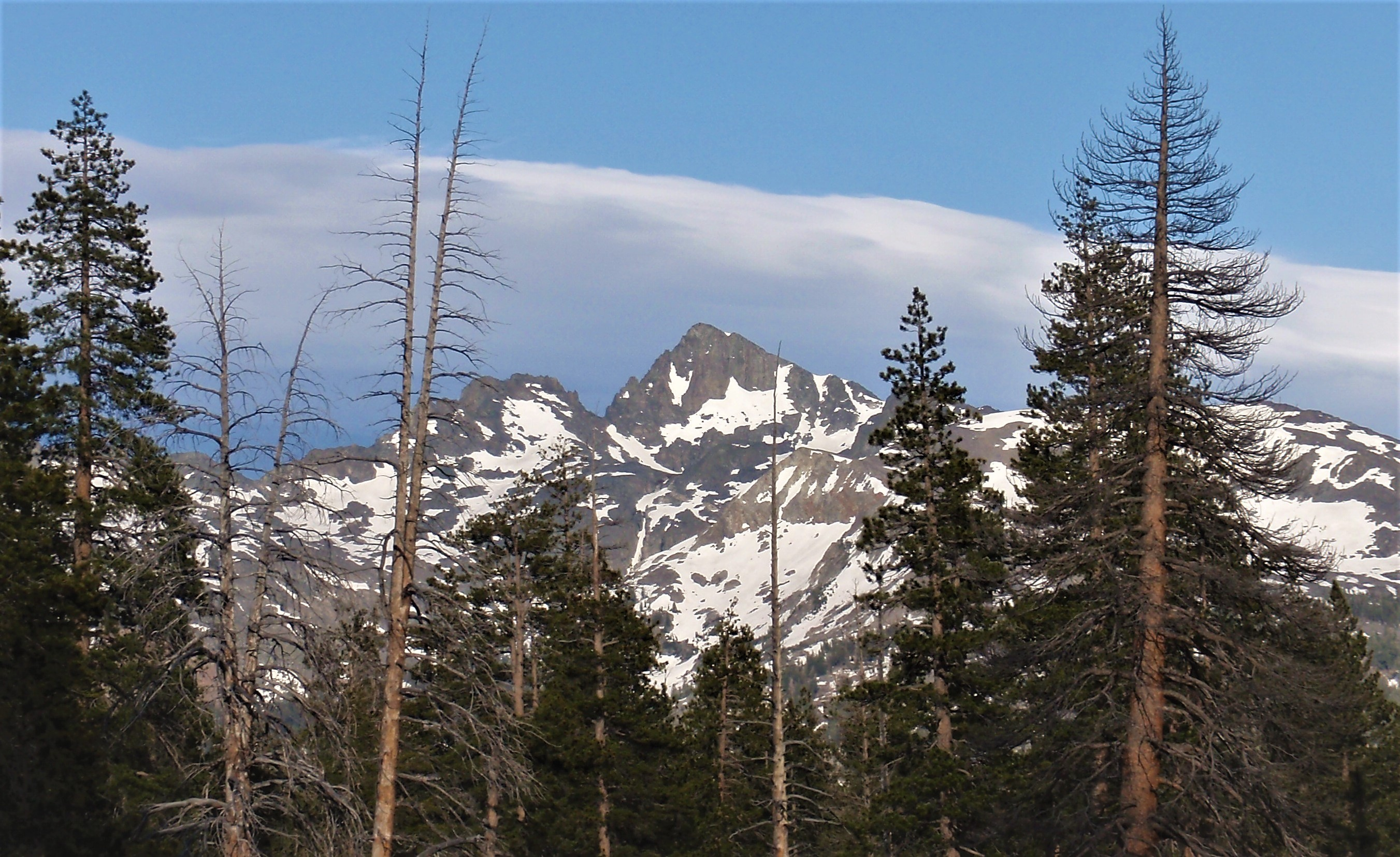
West aspect

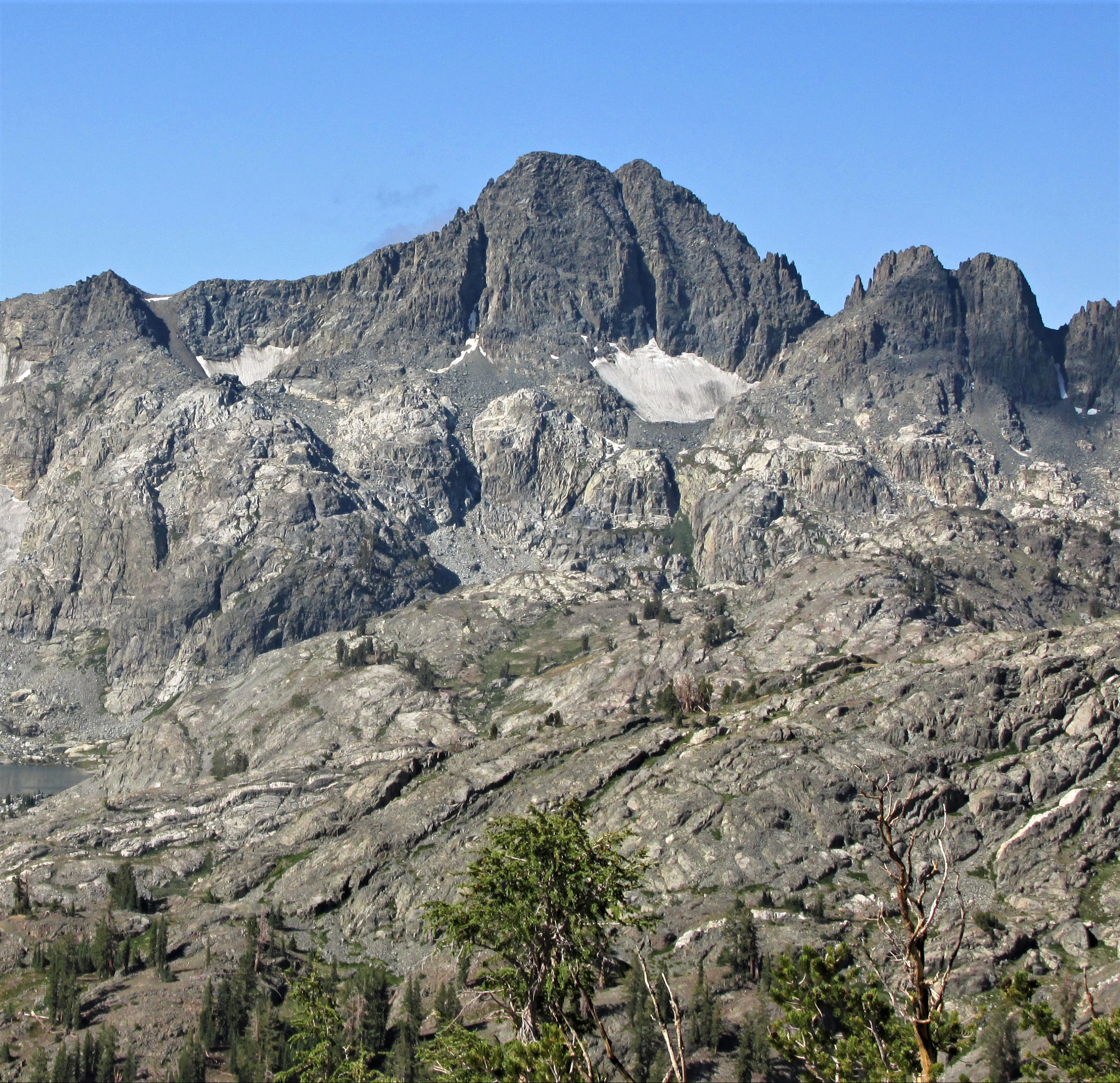
