= Foerster Peak =

Mountain in Yosemite National Park, USA

- Location within California Location within the United States

Highest point
- Elevation: 12,057 ft (3,675 m) NAVD 88
- Prominence: 457 ft (139 m)
- Coordinates: 37°41′24″N 119°17′27″W

Geography
- Location: Yosemite National Park, Madera County, California, U.S.
- Parent range: Ritter Range, Sierra Nevada

Climbing
- First ascent: in 1914, by Norman Clyde,

Foerster Peak is a mountain, broadly east of the Half Dome area of Yosemite National Park. Foerster Peak is far, from any road, by over 10 miles (16 km).

Foerster Peak was named for Lewis Foerster, US military who was on duty in Yosemite in 1895.

From most directions, Foerster Peak is a class 2 climb; some are class 2—class 3.

== On Foerster Peak's locale ==
Foerster Peak is one of three Sierra Peaks Section listed peaks on along the boundary separating southeastern Yosemite from the Ansel Adams Wilderness.

Foerster Peak is loosely southeast of Half Dome and Clouds Rest, and is east of Mount Starr King. Foerster Peak is loosely northwest of Electra Peak. It is southwest of Mount Ansel Adams, loosely northeast of Gray Peak, and Red Peak. It is loosely southeast of Mount Florence, southwest of Mount Lyell and Rodgers Peak, is west of Mount Ritter, is northeast of Merced Peak. Foerster Peak is also southeast of Lake Merced and Merced Lake High Sierra Camp, and Washburn Lake. Foerster Peak is east of Mount Clark. Quartzite Peak is nearby.

== External links and references ==
- On a hiking route, which passes through the area
