= Rodgers Peak =

Mountain in California, United States

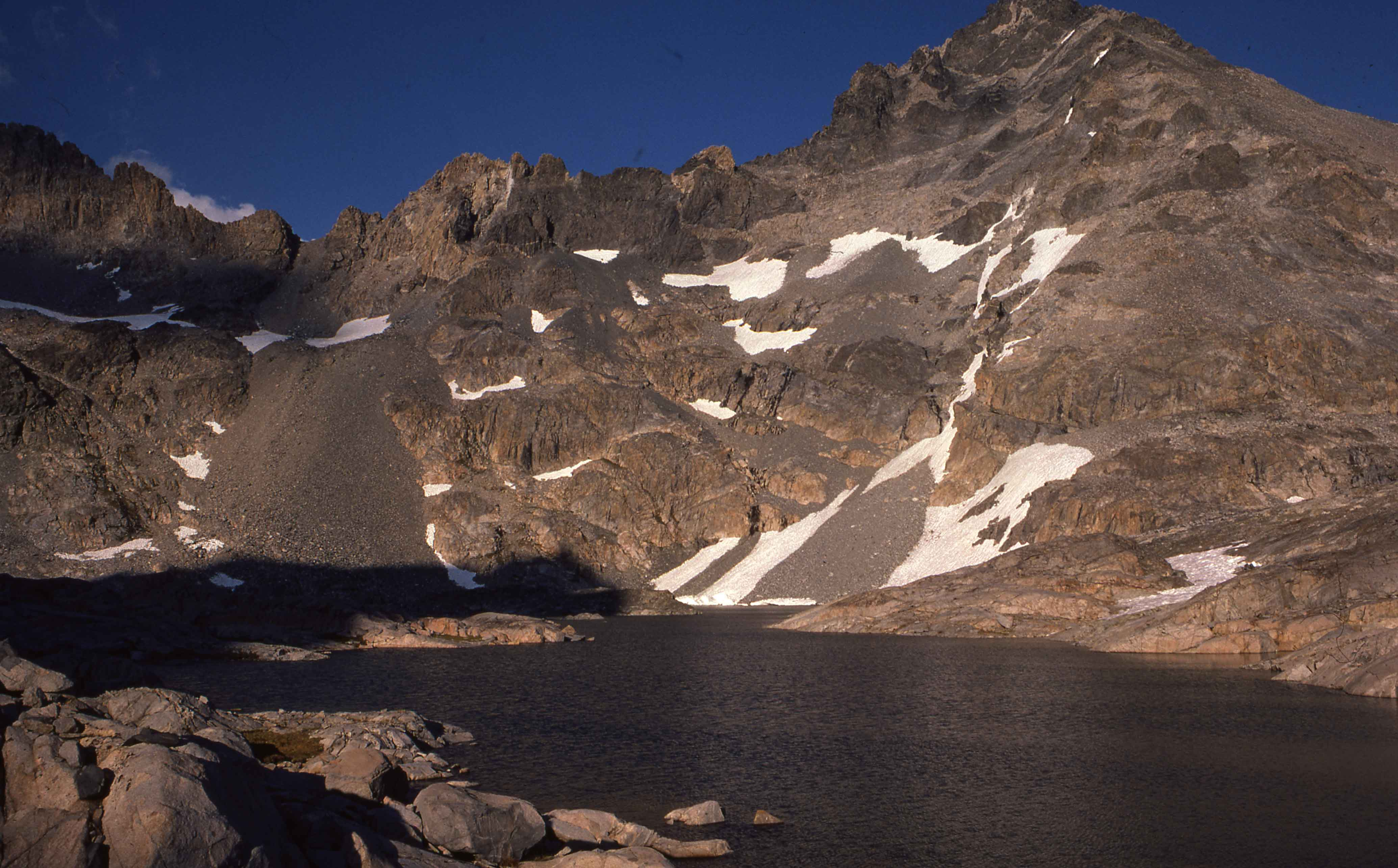
- Rodgers Peak from Lyell Lake

Highest point
- Elevation: 12,978 ft (3,956 m) NAVD 88
- Prominence: 738 ft (225 m)
- Listing: Mountains of California
- Coordinates: 37°43′30″N 119°15′27″W

Geography
- Location within California Location within the United States
- Location: Mono County / Madera County; California, U.S.
- Parent range: Ritter Range
- Topo map: USGS Mount Lyell

Climbing
- Easiest route: Scramble, class 2 "Rodgers Peak". SummitPost.org.

Rodgers Peak is the most northwestern peak in the Ritter Range in Madera County, California. The peak lies on the boundary between Yosemite National Park and the Ansel Adams Wilderness further east. Rodgers Peak is the fourth-highest mountain in Yosemite National Park.

Mount Davis, Banner Peak, and Mount Ritter are visible from the summit, as well as the Yosemite peaks Mount Maclure and Mount Lyell. Electra Peak is quite close, and Foerster Peak is also near.

== Etymology ==
All of Rodgers Peak, Rodgers Canyon, Rodgers Meadow, and Rodgers Lake are named for Captain Alexander Rodgers, Fourth Cavalry, US Army, who was acting superintendent of Yosemite National Park, in 1895 and 1897.

Lieutenant N. F. McClure named the peak, in 1895.

== Climate ==
According to the Köppen climate classification system, Rodgers Peak is located in an alpine climate zone. Most weather fronts originate in the Pacific Ocean, and travel east toward the Sierra Nevada mountains. As fronts approach, they are forced upward by the peaks (orographic lift), causing them to drop their moisture in the form of rain or snowfall onto the range.

== External links and references ==
- Media related to Rodgers Peak at Wikimedia Commons
- Notes on Rodgers Pass
