= Thousand Island Lake =

Lake in the state of California, United States

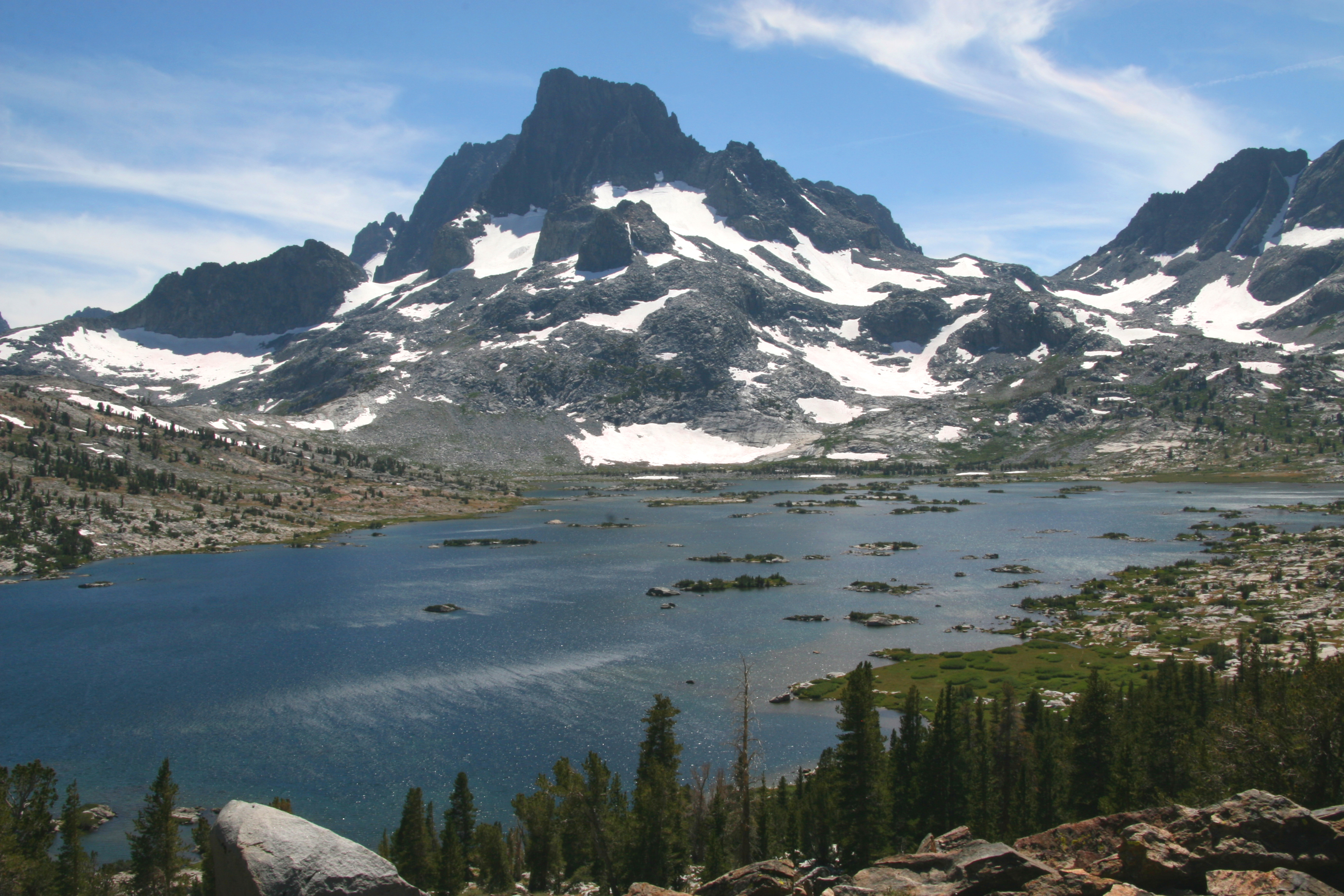
- Banner Peak above the lake

- Location within California Location within the United States
- Location: Sierra Nevada, Ansel Adams Wilderness, Madera County, California, United States
- Coordinates: 37°43′15″N 119°10′56″W
- Primary outflows: Middle Fork San Joaquin River
- Basin countries: United States
- Max. length: 2.5 mi (4.0 km)
- Max. width: 0.7 mi (1.1 km)
- Surface elevation: 2,997 metres (9,833 ft)
- Islands: many

Thousand Island Lake is a large alpine lake in the Sierra Nevada, within the Ansel Adams Wilderness in eastern Madera County, California.

The lake is named for the many small rocky islands that dot its surface. Theodore Solomons probably established the 'Thousand Island' name, as this appears on his 1896 map. John Muir called it by "Islet Lake."

== Geography ==
The lake is within the boundaries of the Ansel Adams Wilderness of the Sierra National Forest and Inyo National Forest. Thousand Island Lake sits at the base of Banner Peak in the Ritter Range. It is the source of the Middle Fork of the San Joaquin River, which flows southeast, and then west, into the San Joaquin Valley. The lake is a glacial tarn, formed in the bottom of a cirque when a glacier retreated.

== Access ==
Thousand Island Lake is accessible from several hiking routes:

- High Trail or River Trail: from Agnew Meadows trailhead (Inyo National Forest) – on road to Devils Postpile National Monument in Mammoth Lakes area
- John Muir Trail
- Pacific Crest Trail
- Sierra High Route
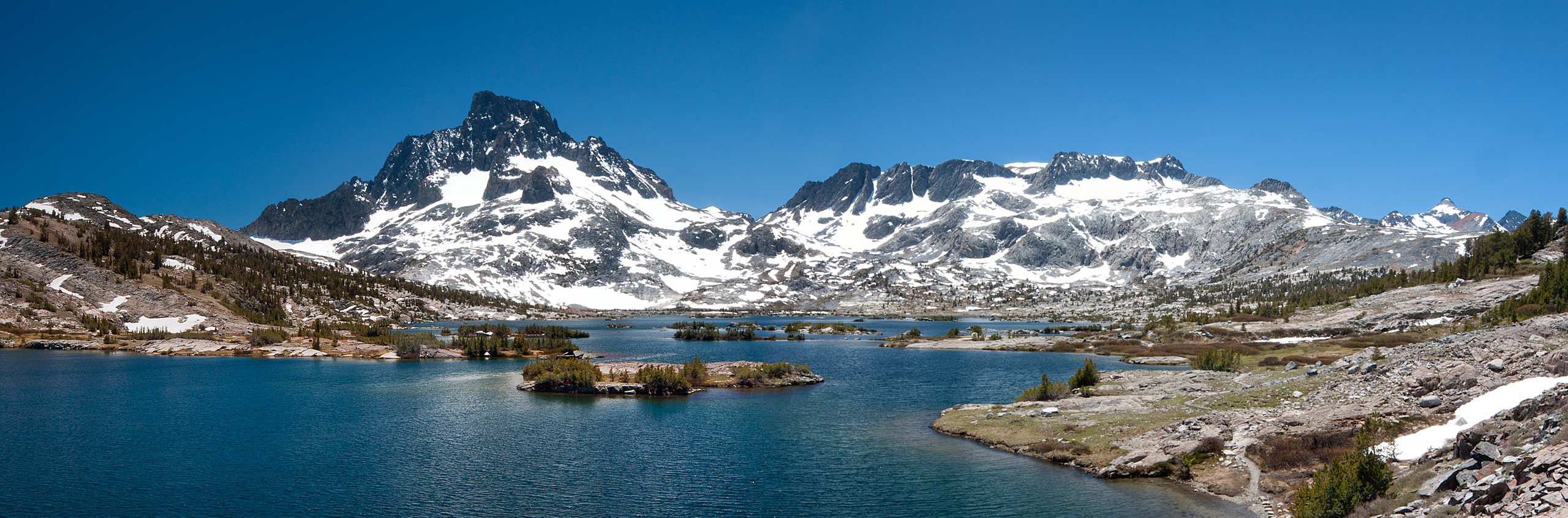
View of the lake from near the outlet creek

== Culture ==
Parmelian Prints of the High Sierras is a portfolio of 18 silver gelatin photographic prints made by Ansel Adams in 1927. It was the first publication of a portfolio of his prints, produced not long after he decided to become a professional photographer, and has since been called "a landmark work in twentieth-century photography." His photograph, "Banner Peak – Thousand Island Lake", was one of the 18 chosen for the collection. The photograph also appears in the Smithsonian American Art Museum and San Francisco Museum of Modern Art.

== See also ==
- List of lakes in California
- Sierra Nevada subalpine zone
