= Volcanic Ridge =

Geological formation in California, US

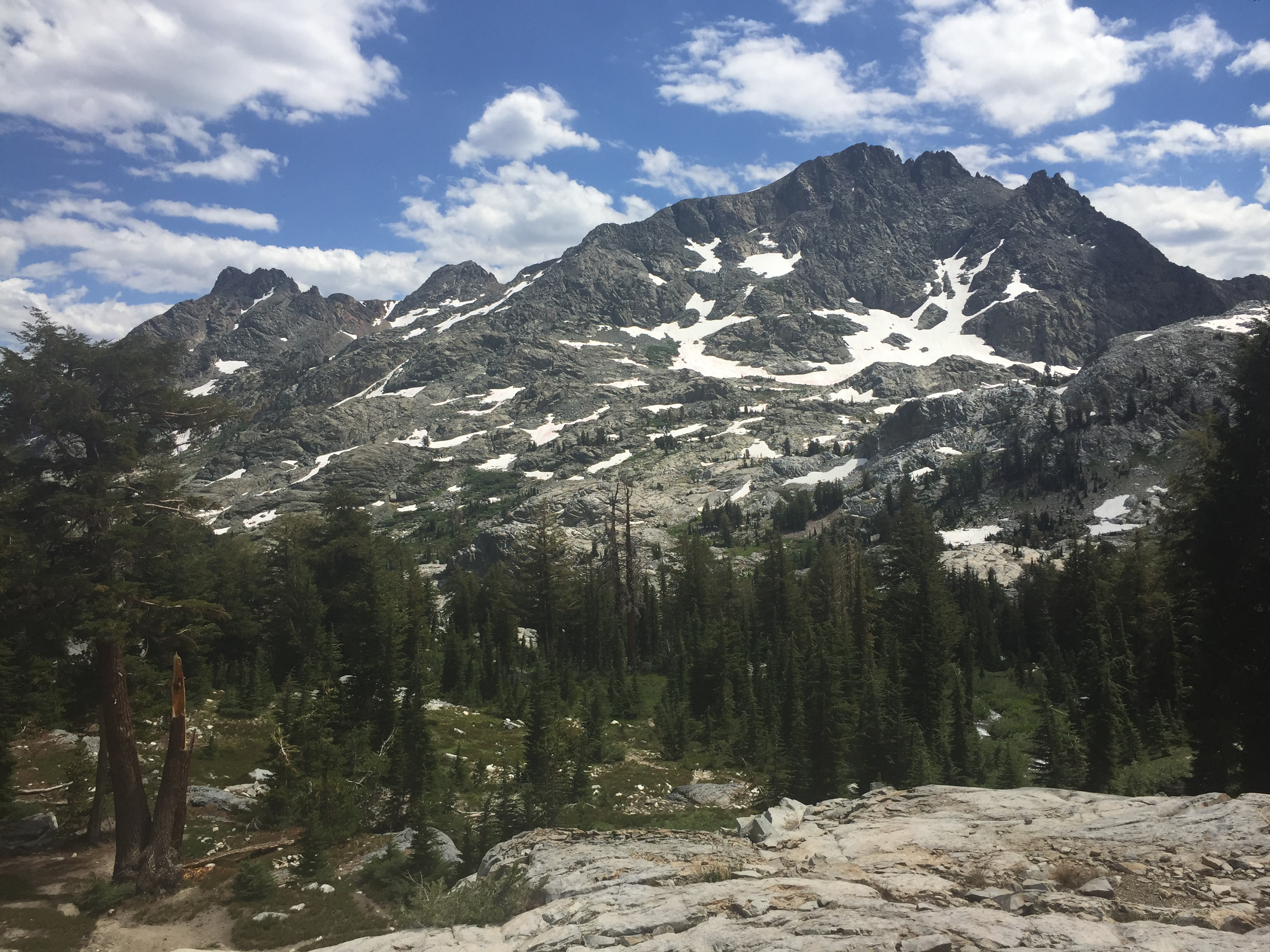
- Northwest aspect

Highest point
- Elevation: 11,486 ft (3,501 m)
- Prominence: 1,232 ft (376 m)
- Parent peak: Clyde Minaret (12,263 ft)
- Isolation: 1.06 mi (1.71 km)
- Coordinates: 37°40′16″N 119°09′37″W

Geography
- Location within California Location within the United States
- Location: Madera County, California, U.S.
- Parent range: Sierra Nevada; Ritter Range
- Topo map: USGS Mount Ritter

Geology
- Rock age: Mesozoic
- Rock type: Metavolcanic rock

Climbing
- First ascent: 1933
- Easiest route: class 2

Volcanic Ridge is an 11,486-foot-elevation (3,501-meter) ridge located in the Sierra Nevada mountain range in Madera County of northern California, United States. It is situated in the Ansel Adams Wilderness on land managed by Inyo National Forest. It is set in the Ritter Range, 1.9 miles (3.1 km) southeast of Mount Ritter, and approximately 10 miles (16 km) west of the community of Mammoth Lakes. The Minarets are one mile to the west and Devils Postpile National Monument is five miles to the southeast. Topographic relief is significant as the west aspect rises over 1,700 feet (520 meters) above Iceberg Lake in approximately one-half mile.

== History ==
The descriptive toponym was likely applied during an 1898–99 survey by the USGS, and has been officially adopted by the U.S. Board on Geographic Names.

The first ascent of the summit was recorded August 13, 1933, by Craig Barbash and Howard Gates.

The Minaret Mine was located on the south aspect of the ridge. Lead was mined there, but the remote location made mining unprofitable, and the mine ceased operations in the early 1930s.

Volcanic Ridge is the site of the fatal 2007 airplane crash of Steve Fossett.

== Climate ==
According to the Köppen climate classification system, Volcanic Ridge is located in an alpine climate zone. Most weather fronts originate in the Pacific Ocean, and travel east toward the Sierra Nevada mountains. As fronts approach, they are forced upward by the peaks (orographic lift), causing them to drop their moisture in the form of rain or snowfall onto the range. Precipitation runoff from this landform drains to the Middle Fork San Joaquin River.

== See also ==
- Sierra Nevada

== Gallery ==
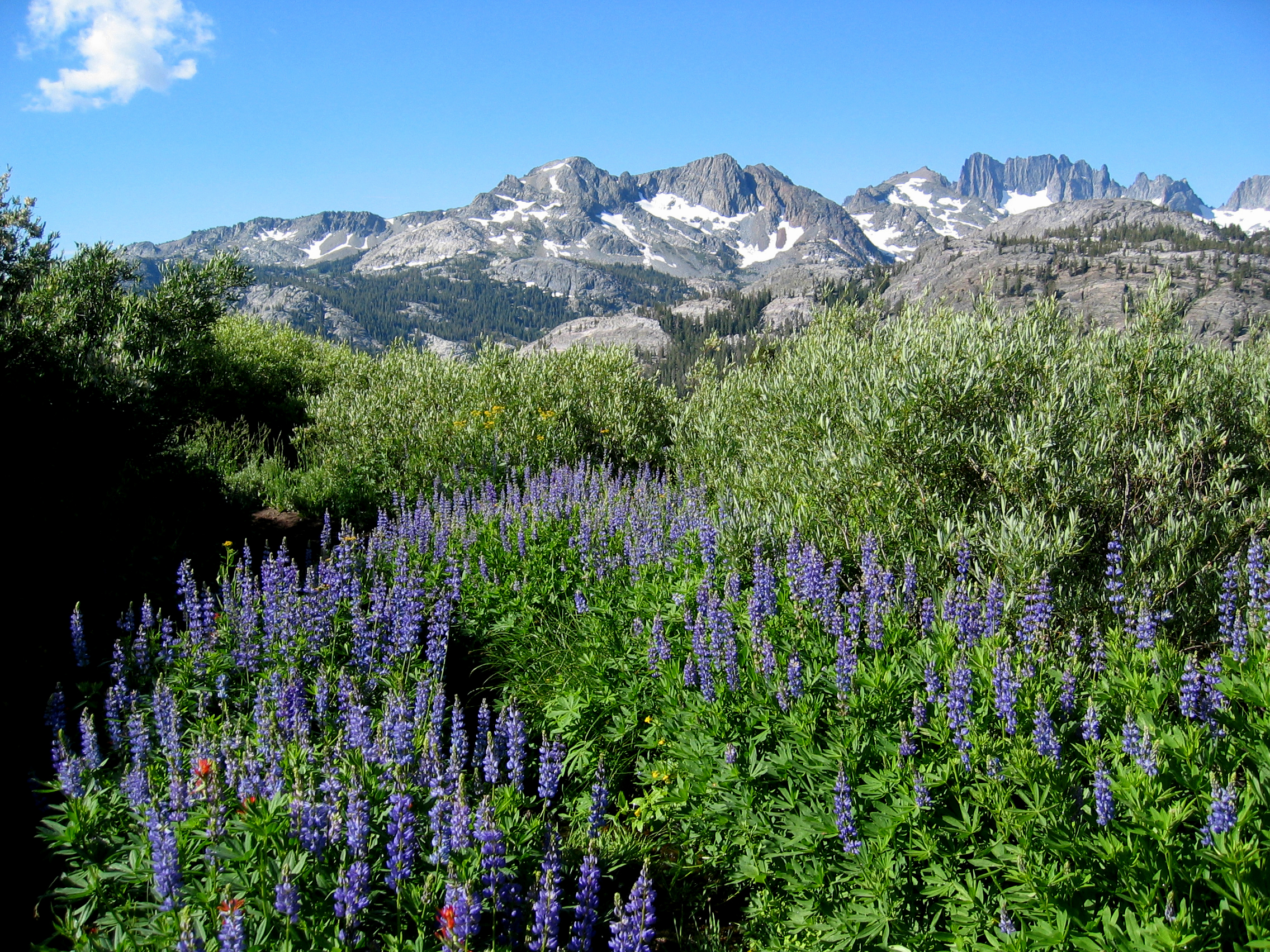
Northeast aspect, with the Minarets in upper right corner.

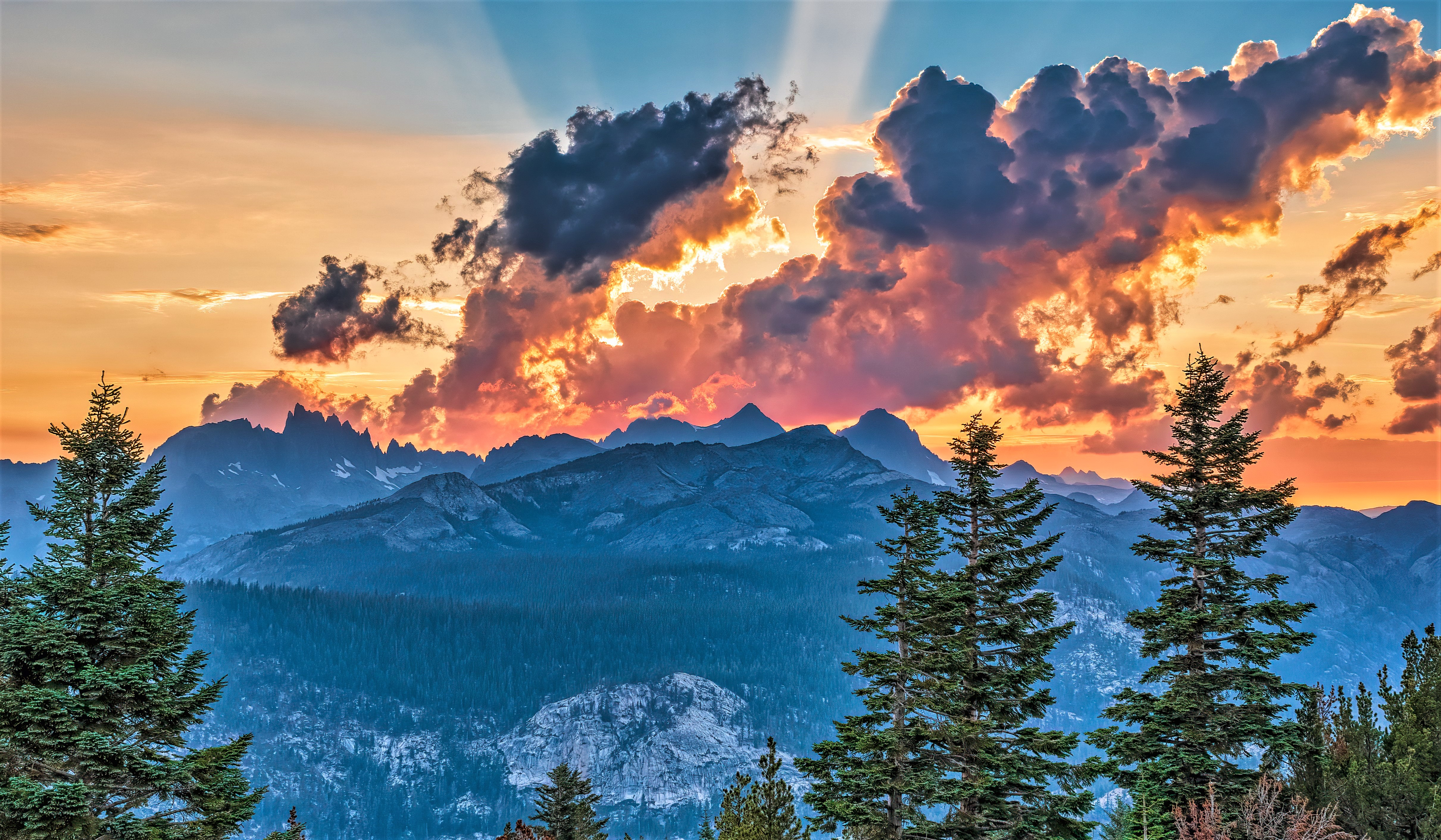
Volcanic Ridge centered, with Ritter Range behind it.

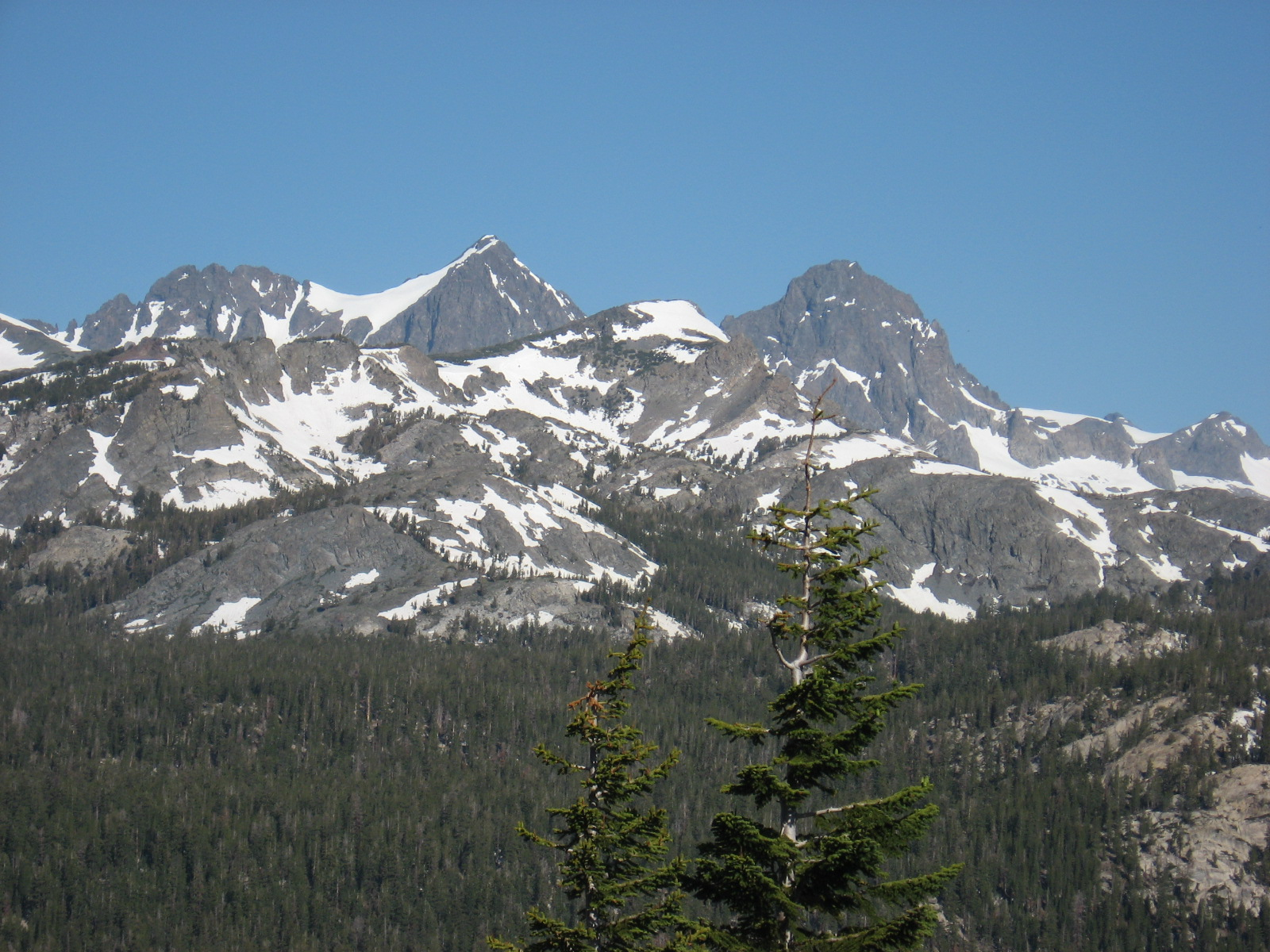
Volcanic Ridge seen with Mount Ritter and Banner Peak behind.

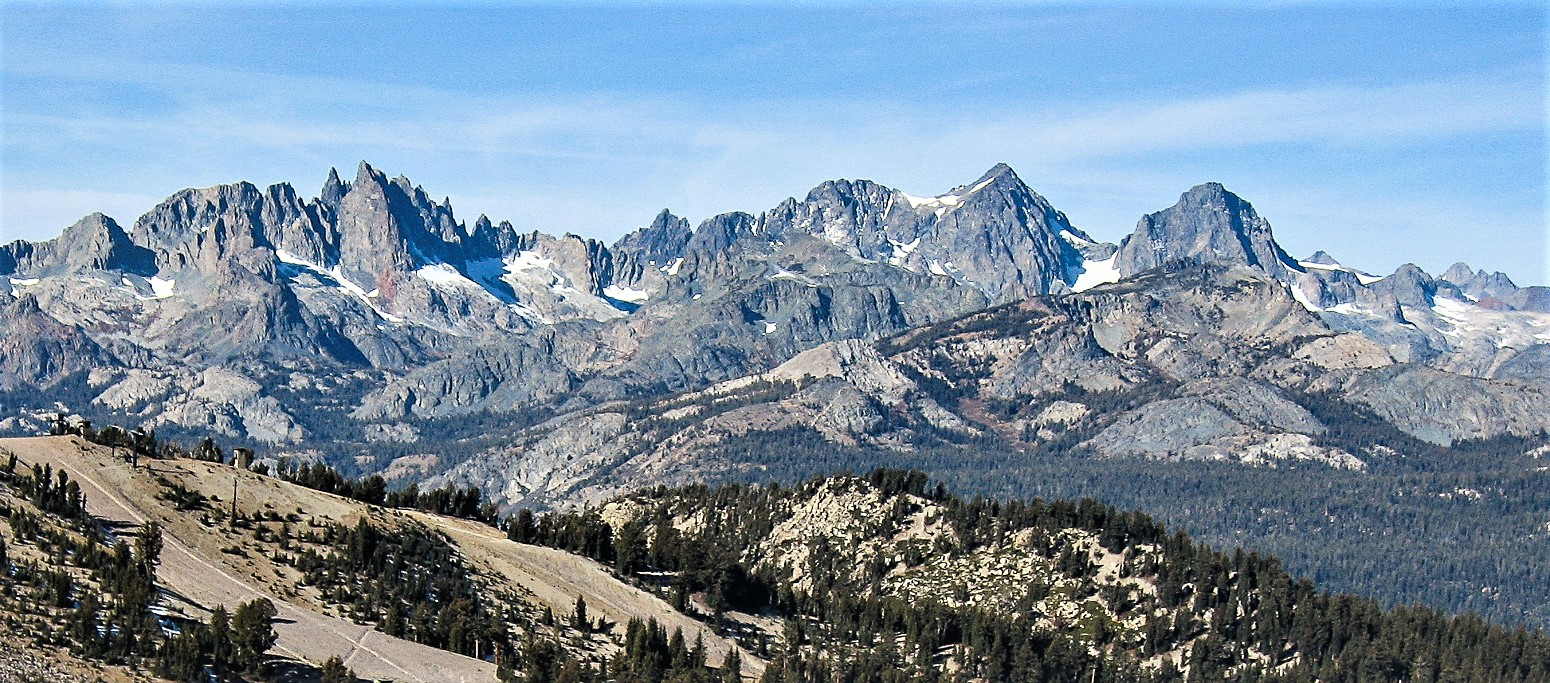
View of the Minarets, Volcanic Ridge, Mount Ritter, and Banner Peak seen from Mammoth Mountain.

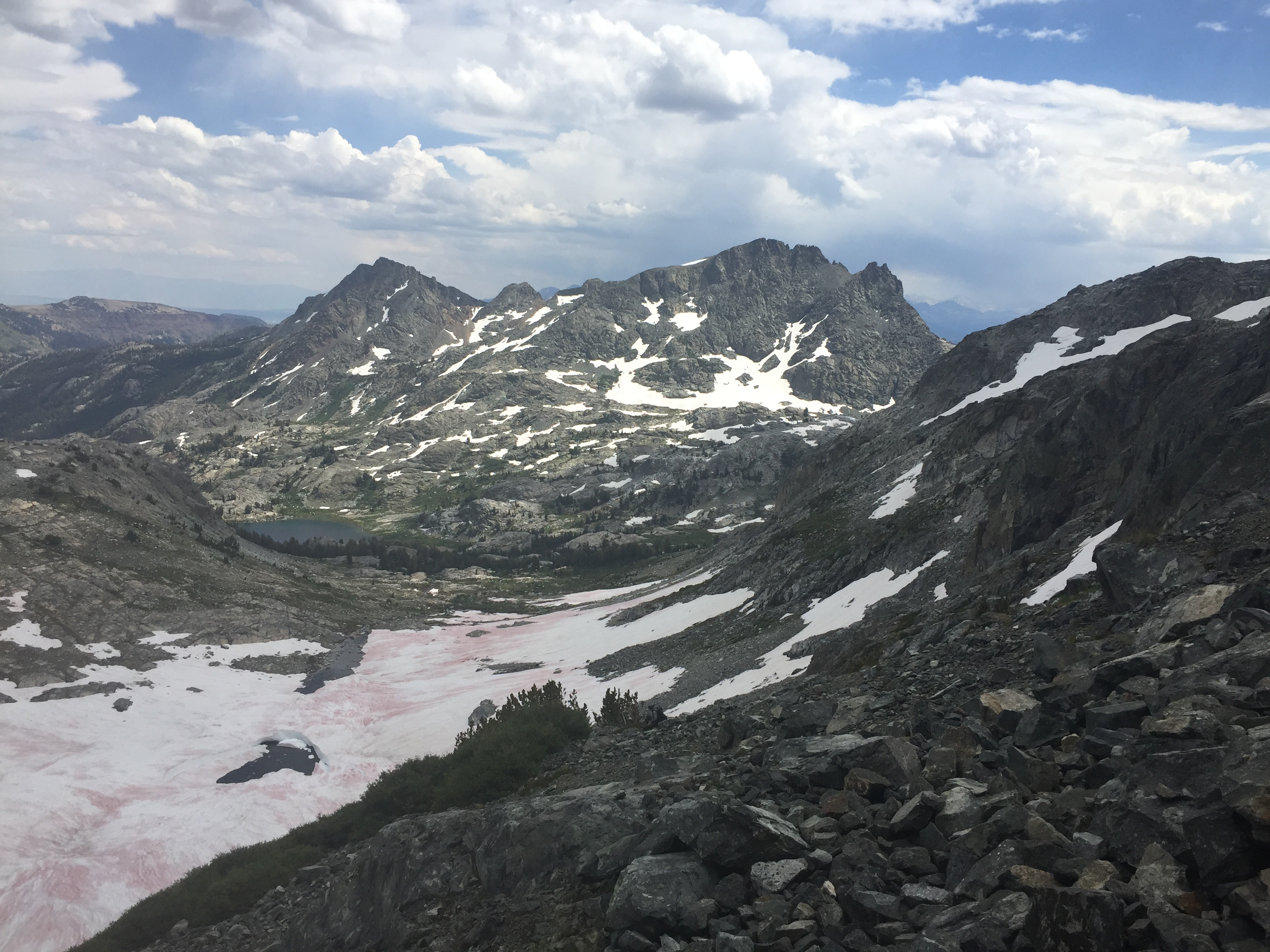
Northwest aspect from Mt. Ritter

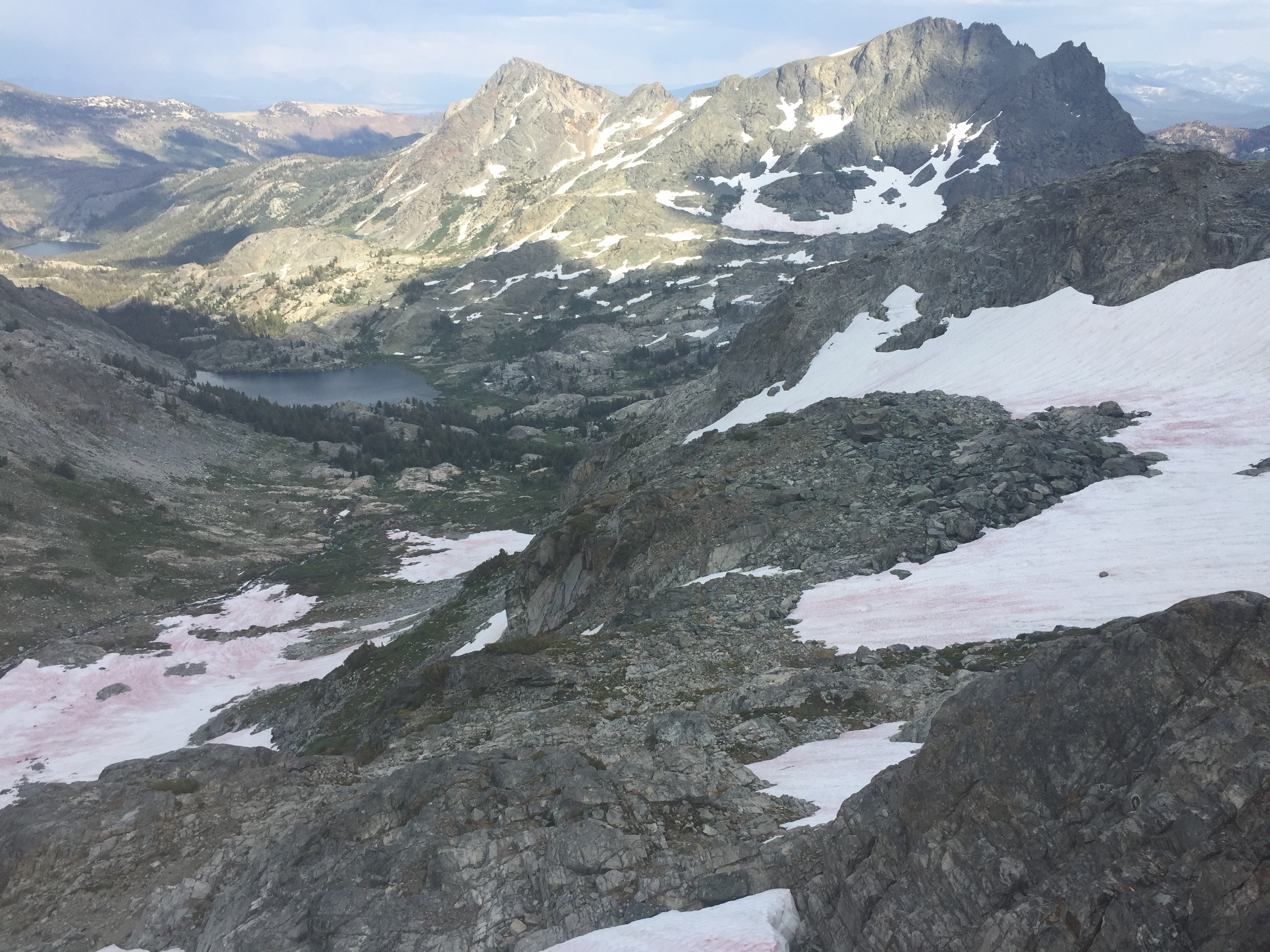
Volcanic Ridge and Ediza Lake

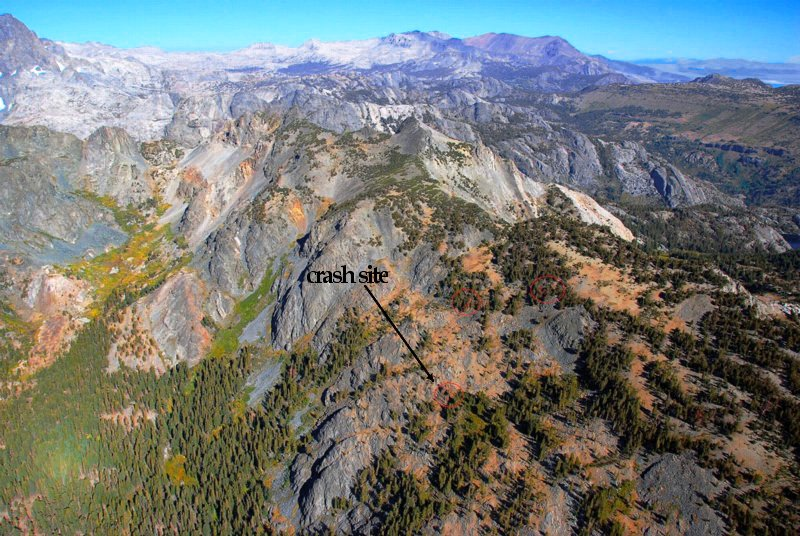
Steve Fossett crash site on Volcanic Ridge

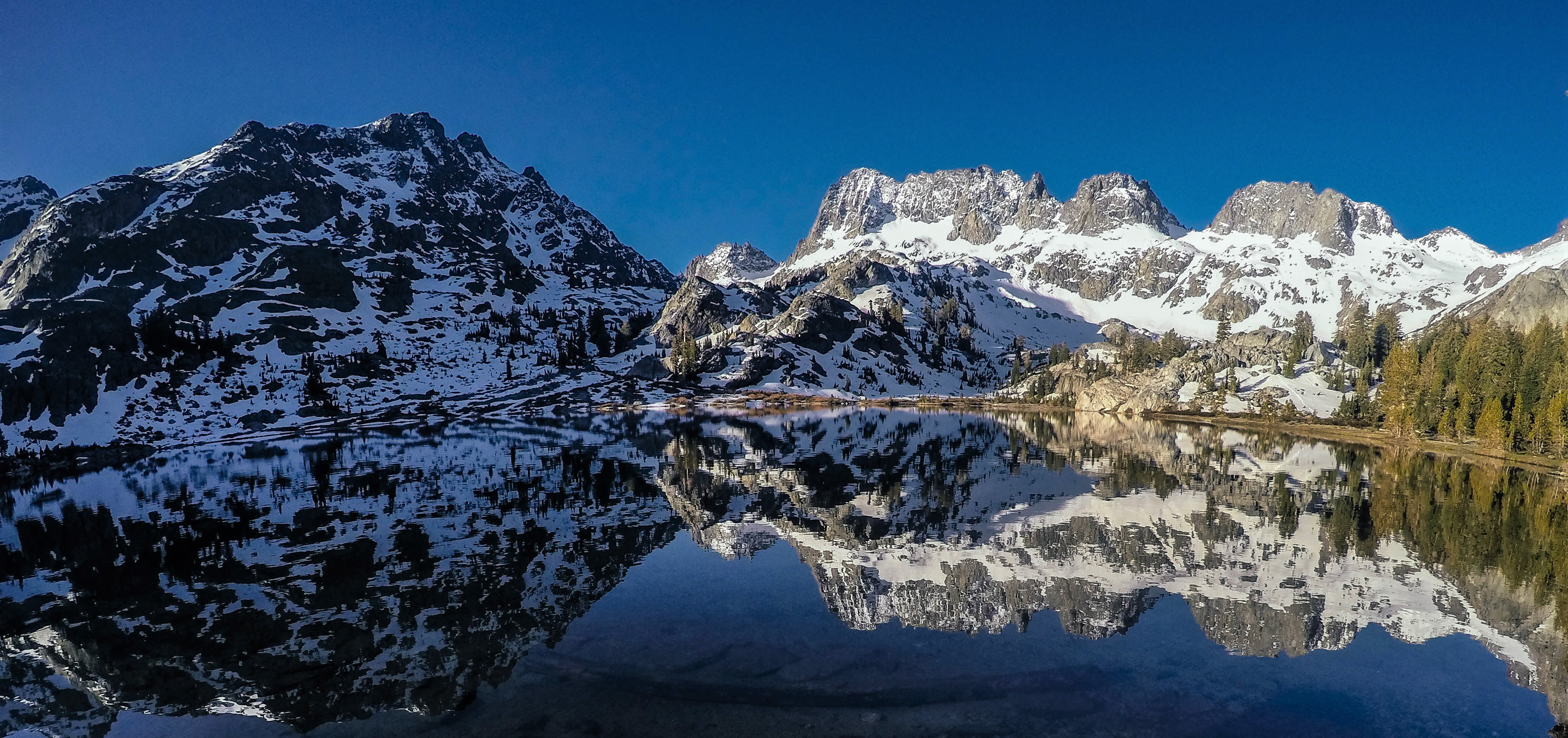
Volcanic Ridge (left) and the Minarets reflected in Ediza Lake.

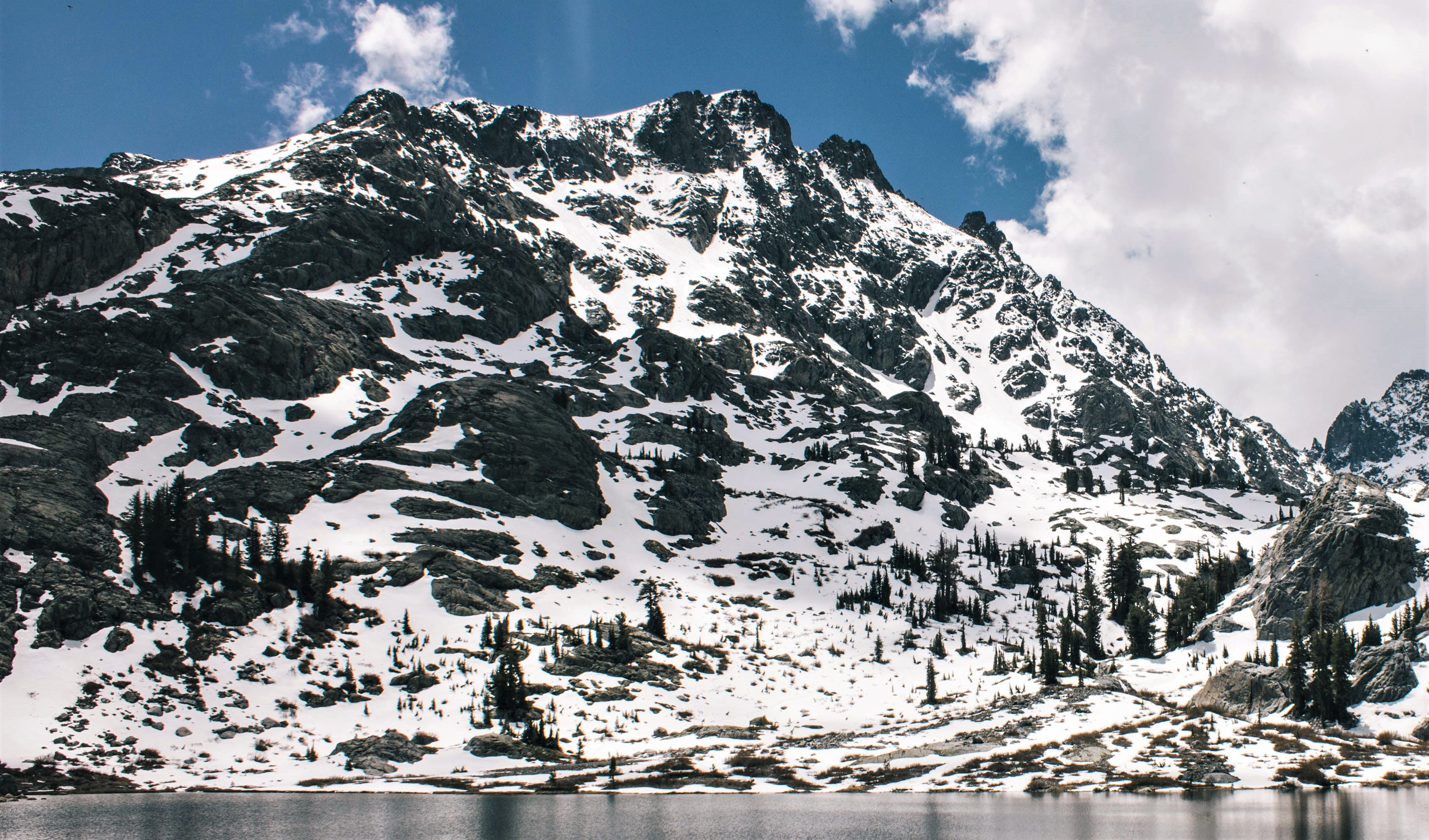
Volcanic Ridge rises above Ediza Lake
