= Blacktop (disambiguation) =

Blacktop or asphalt concrete is a composite material used to surface roads. The word blacktop can also be used to refer directly to a paved road.

Blacktop or Black Top may also refer to:

- Black Top Records, a record label
- Blacktop Peak, a mountain in California
- Black Top, British Jazz duo of Orphy Robinson and Pat Thomas
- Black tops, name for British middle-market newspapers, to distinguish them from “red tops” (tabloids)

== See also ==
- Macadam, a type of road construction
- Tarmacadam, a road surfacing material of macadam surfaces, tar, and sand
