= Minaret Lake =

Lake in the state of California, United States

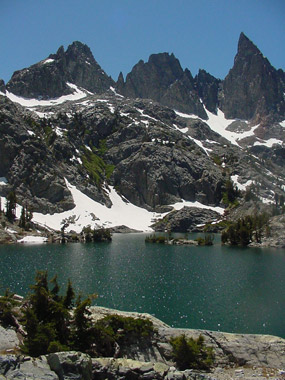
- with The Minarets behind

- Location within California Location within the United States
- Location: Ansel Adams Wilderness, Sierra Nevada, Madera County, California, United States
- Coordinates: 37°39′35″N 119°09′29″W
- Primary outflows: Minaret Creek
- Basin countries: United States
- Surface elevation: 9,800 feet (3,000 m)

Minaret Lake is a lake in the Ritter Range, a subrange of the Sierra Nevada, in California. It is located in extreme northeastern Madera County, within the Ansel Adams Wilderness of the Inyo National Forest.

Minaret Lake is notable for being on the Sierra High Route.

It is near the fatal 2007 airplane crash site of Steve Fossett (Fossett's plane crashed north of the lake, near the Minaret Mine on Volcanic Ridge).

== See also ==
- List of lakes in California
