= Blacktop Peak =

Mountain in the state of California

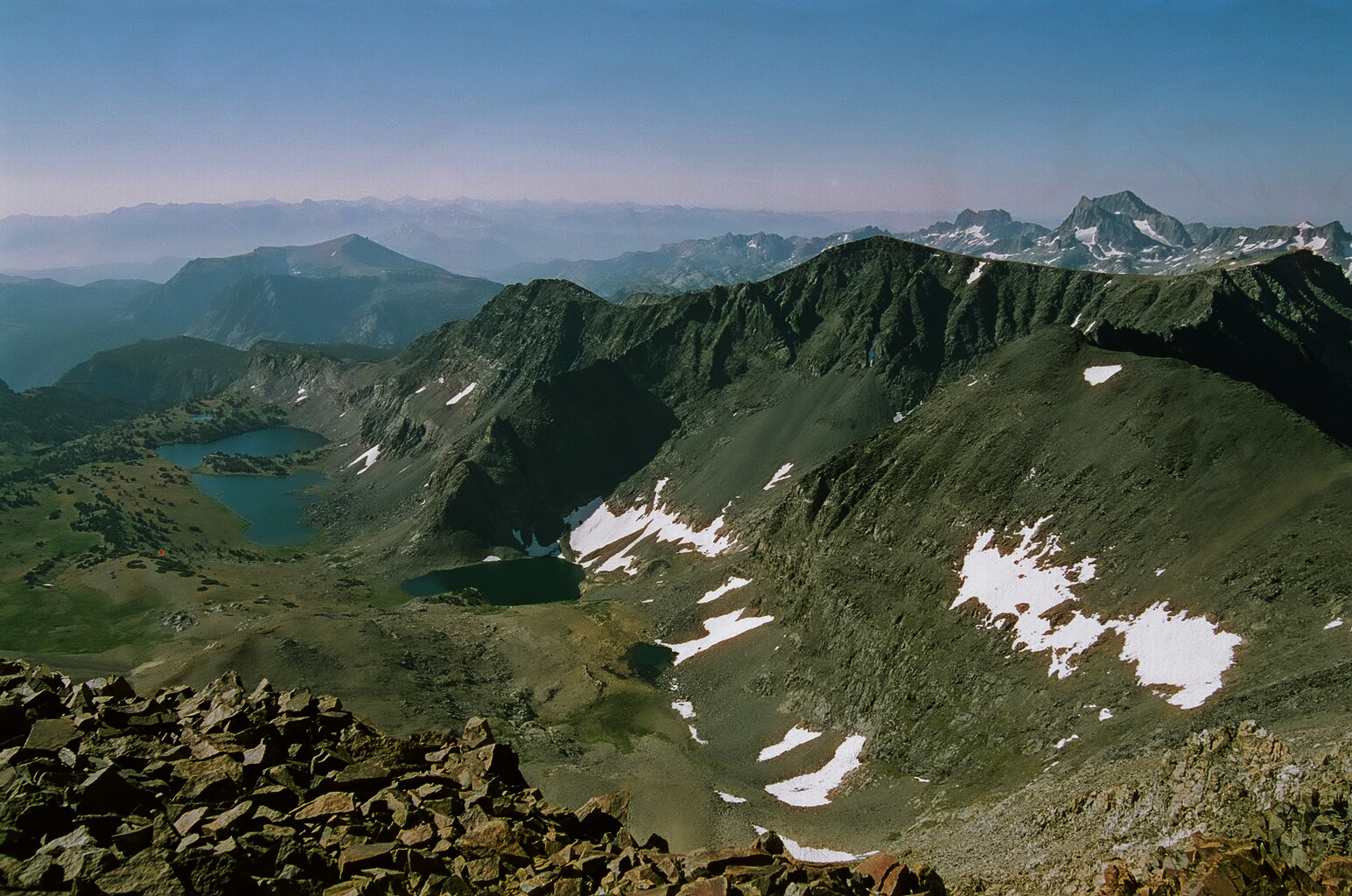
- Blacktop right of center, from northwest

Highest point
- Elevation: 12,724 ft (3,878 m)
- Prominence: 360 ft (110 m)
- Parent peak: Kuna Peak (13,002 ft)
- Isolation: 1.48 mi (2.38 km)
- Listing: Vagmarken Club Sierra Crest List
- Coordinates: 37°47′37″N 119°11′46″W

Geography
- Location within California Location within the United States
- Location: Ansel Adams Wilderness; Mono County, California, U.S.
- Parent range: Sierra Nevada
- Topo map: USGS Koip Peak

Geology
- Rock age: Cretaceous
- Mountain type: Fault block
- Rock type: Metamorphic rock

Climbing
- First ascent: Unknown
- Easiest route: class 2

Blacktop Peak is a 12,724-foot-elevation (3,878-meter) mountain summit located along the crest of the Sierra Nevada mountain range, in Mono County of northern California, United States. It is situated in the Ansel Adams Wilderness, on land managed by Inyo National Forest. The summit lies one-half mile outside of Yosemite National Park's eastern boundary, and some of the lower western slope lies within the park. Blacktop Peak ranks as the 228th-highest summit in the state of California.

Blacktop Peak was likely named from its appearance. This geographical feature's name was officially adopted in 1932 by the U.S. Board on Geographic Names.

== Climate ==
According to the Köppen climate classification system, Blacktop Peak is located in an alpine climate zone. Most weather fronts originate in the Pacific Ocean, and travel east toward the Sierra Nevada mountains. As fronts approach, they are forced upward by the peaks (orographic lift), causing them to drop their moisture in the form of rain or snowfall onto the range.

== See also ==
- Geology of the Yosemite area

== Gallery ==
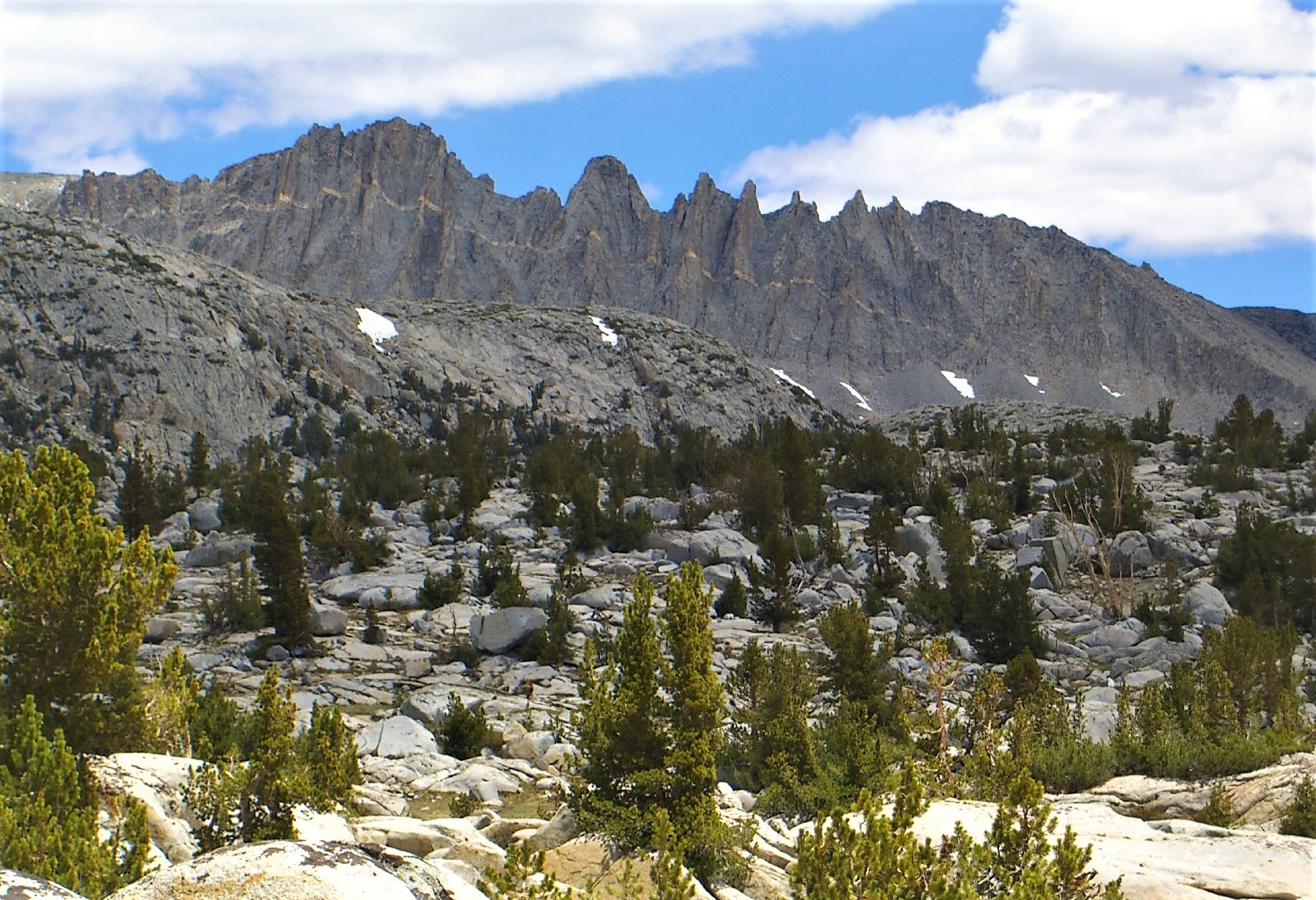
The ridge extending south from Blacktop Peak

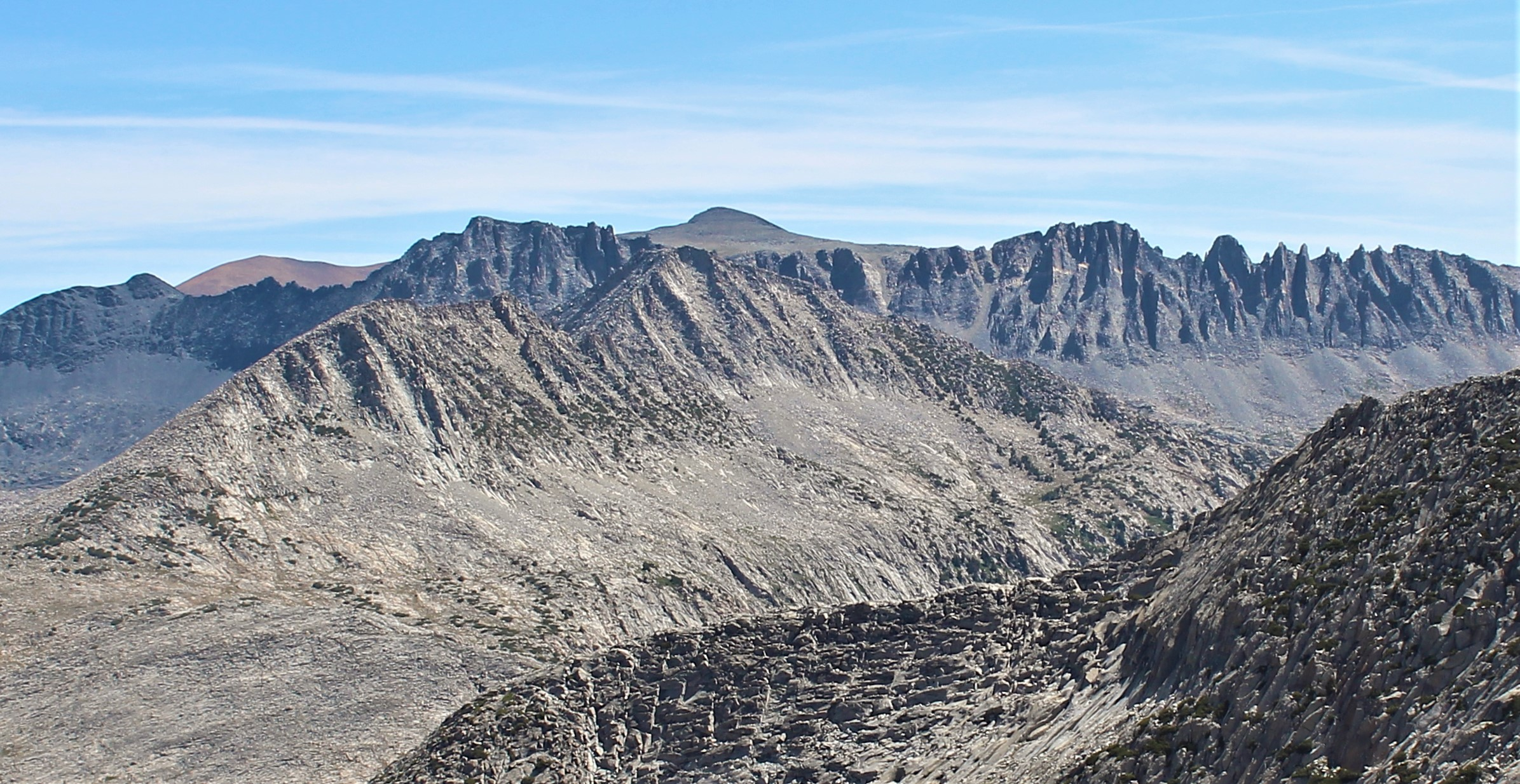
Camera pointed northeast, showing Donohue Peak, then Mount Andrea Lawrence, and then Blacktop Peak furthest in back centered at top.
