= Mount Ansel Adams =

Mountain in California, United States

- Location within California Location within the United States

Highest point
- Elevation: 11,766+ ft (3586+ m) NAVD 88
- Coordinates: 37°41′52″N 119°16′53″W

Geography
- Location: Yosemite National Park; Madera County, California, U.S.
- Parent range: Sierra Nevada
- Topo map: USGS Mount Lyell

Climbing
- First ascent: July 11, 1934 by Glen Dawson, Jack Riegelhuth and Neil Ruge
- Easiest route: Exposed scramble, class 3

Mount Ansel Adams is a peak in the Sierra Nevada of California with an elevation of 11,766 ft (3,586 m). The summit is in Yosemite National Park near the park's eastern boundary. It lies 0.8 miles (1.3 km) northeast of Foerster Peak and 1.3 miles (2.1 km) west-southwest of Electra Peak at the head of the Lyell Fork of the Merced River. It was named in 1985 for Ansel Adams, the preeminent landscape photographer, conservationist, and member of the board of directors of the Sierra Club, a role he maintained for 37 years.
