= Sierra High Route =

Off-trail route in California's High Sierra

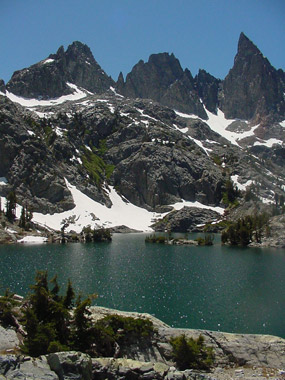
- High Route hikers travel around Minaret Lake
- Length: 195 miles (314 km) (different source: 220 miles)
- Location: Sierra Nevada Mountains, California, USA
- Trailheads: Yosemite NP 38°08′49″N 119°22′39″W; Kings Canyon NP 36°47′44″N 118°35′04″W
- Highest point: Near Feather Peak, 12,360+ ft (3,767 m)
- Lowest point: Cedar Grove, 5,020 ft (1,530 m)

The Sierra High Route (also called the Roper Route and the High Route) is a cross-country hiking route, 195 miles (314 km) long, through the Sierra Nevada. It was scouted by Steve Roper and described by him in his book Sierra High Route: Traversing Timberline Country.

Much of the Sierra High Route runs parallel to the John Muir Trail, staying east of that trail and keeping above the timberline to higher elevations — between 9,000 and 11,500 feet (2,700 and 3,500 m). About a third of the route follows maintained hiking trails (including 28 miles (45 km) of the John Muir Trail); the rest of the route traverses off-trail meadowlands, granite slabs, and, at high elevations, difficult loose-talus terrain. Hiking the route does not require advanced mountaineering skills, but the hiker occasionally encounters class-3 rock faces in which footholds and handholds must be carefully chosen and tested. The route requires the use of route descriptions, topographical maps, and one or more instruments (e.g., compass, GPS receiver) to navigate. Writes Roper in Sierra High Route, "High Route adventurers will not be put off by the lack of an actual trail, since much of the singular joy of cross-country travel lies in wandering through the timberline country as the pioneers did--wondering what the next turn will reveal."

Roper divides the route into five segments:

- Cirque Country: Cedar Grove to Dusy Basin, traversing the Monarch Divide, Lake (Cartridge Creek) Basin, Upper Basin, Palisades Basin, Barrett Lakes Basin, and Dusy Basin.
- Whitebark Country: Dusy Basin to Lake Italy, through LeConte Canyon, Muir Pass, Evolution Basin, the Glacier Divide, Humphrey's Basin, and Bear Lakes Basin.
- Lake Country: Lake Italy to Devils Postpile by way of Bear Lakes Basin, Mono Lakes Basin, the Recesses, the Silver Divide, and the Mammoth Crest.
- Headwaters Country: Devil's Postpile to Tuolumne Meadows, crossing the Ritter Range and the Cathedral Range. Roper calls this "Headwaters Country" because the route crosses headwaters of the San Joaquin River.
- Canyon Country: Tuolumne Meadows to Twin Lakes through Yosemite's north country.

From south to north (the direction Roper recommends hiking it), the Sierra High Route passes through Kings Canyon National Park, the Inyo National Forest, and Yosemite National Park.

In 2006, Backpacker magazine editor Steve Howe hiked the entire Sierra High Route in one month.

The unsupported fastest known time on the route is 4d 3h 36m, set in 2020 by Montana State professor of mathematics David Ayala. The women's unsupported FKT of 4d 23h 53m was set by Renee Elsdon Jacobs in 2020.
