= Carl Ritter =

German geographer (1779–1859)

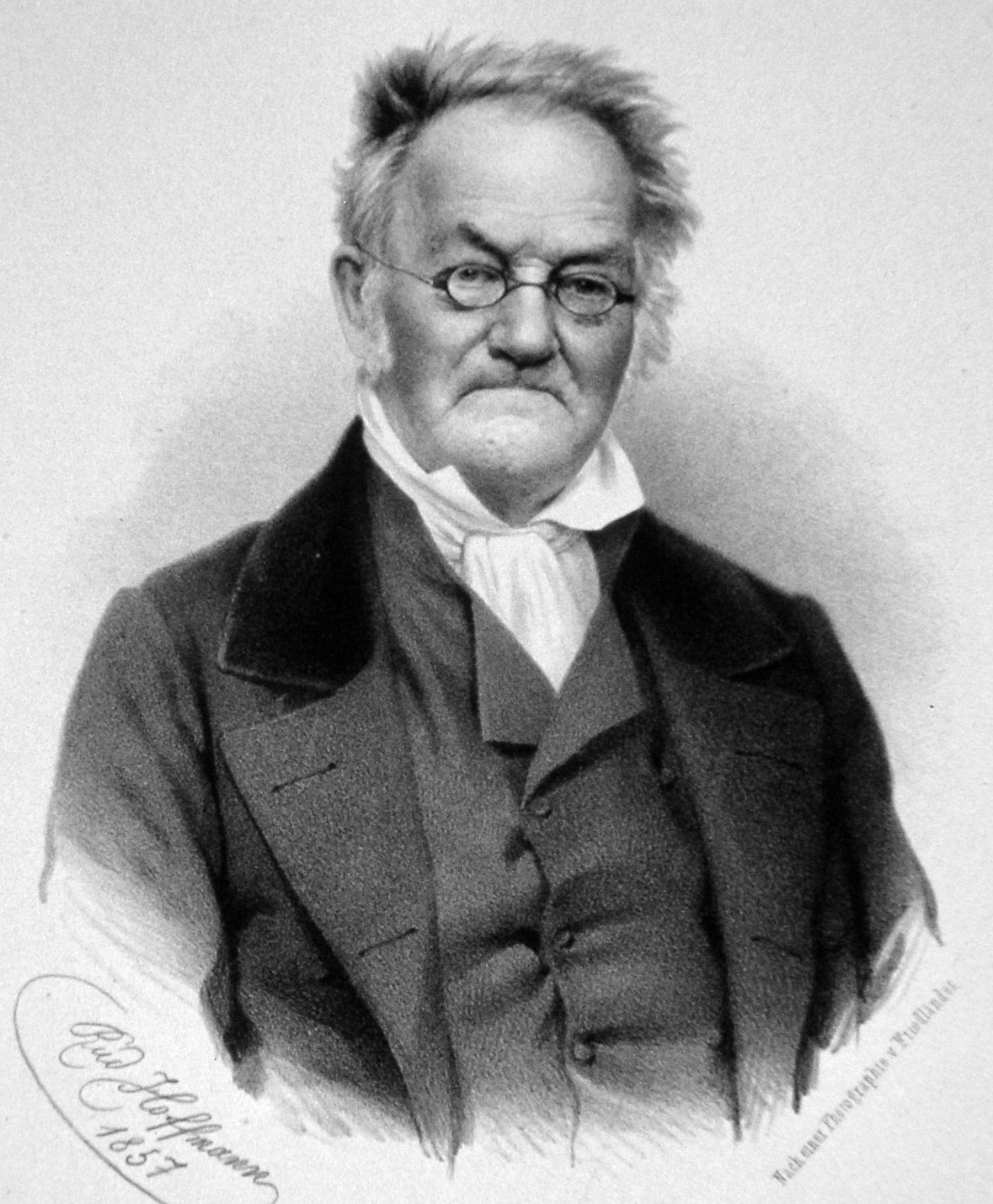
Lithograph by Rudolf Hoffmann (1857)

Carl Ritter (August 7, 1779 – September 28, 1859) was a German geographer. Along with Alexander von Humboldt, he is considered one of the founders of modern geography, as they established it as an independent scientific discipline. From 1825 until his death, he occupied the first chair in geography at the University of Berlin.

== Biography ==
Carl Ritter was born in Quedlinburg, one of the six children of a doctor, F. W. Ritter.

Ritter's father died when he was two. At the age of five, he was enrolled in the Schnepfenthal Salzmann School, a school focused on the study of nature (apparently influenced by Jean-Jacques Rousseau's writings on children's education). This experience would influence Ritter throughout his life, as he retained an interest in new educational modes, including those of Johann Heinrich Pestalozzi. Indeed, much of Ritter's writing was based on Pestalozzi's three stages in teaching: the acquisition of the material, the general comparison of material, and the establishment of a general system.

After completion of his schooling, Ritter was introduced to Bethmann Hollweg, a banker in Frankfurt. It was arranged that Ritter should become tutor to Hollweg's children, but that in the meantime he should attend the University of Halle at his patron's expense. His duties as tutor began in 1798 and continued for fifteen years. The years 1814–1819, which he spent at Göttingen in order still to watch over his pupils, were those in which he began to exclusively study geography. It was there that he courted and married Lilli Kramer, from Duderstadt and that he wrote and published the first two volumes of his Erdkunde.

In 1819, he became professor of history at Frankfurt, and in 1820, he received a teaching appointment in history at the University of Berlin. Ritter received his doctorate there in 1821, and was appointed professor extraordinarius in 1825. He also lectured at a nearby military college. He was particularly interested in the exploration of Africa and held constant contacts with British scholars and scientific circles like the Royal Geographical Society. He was one of the academic teachers of the explorer Heinrich Barth, who traveled in Northern and Western Africa on behalf of the British government to negotiate treaties that were to stop the Trans-Saharan slave trade. Carl Ritter himself was a dedicated anti-slavery propagandist in Germany.

Ritter's impact on geography was especially notable because he brought forth a new conception of the subject. In his view:

geography was a kind of physiology and comparative anatomy of the earth: rivers, mountains, glaciers, &c., were so many distinct organs, each with its own appropriate functions; and, as his physical frame is the basis of the man, determinative to a large extent of his life, so the structure of each country is a leading element in the historic progress of the nation. The earth is a cosmic individual with a particular organization, an ens sui generis with a progressive development: the exploration of this individuality of the earth is the task of geography.

In 1822, Ritter was elected to the Prussian Academy of Sciences, and in 1824, he became a corresponding member of the Société Asiatique de Paris. In 1828, he established the Gesellschaft für Erdkunde zu Berlin (Berlin Geographical Society). He was elected a Foreign Honorary Member of the American Academy of Arts and Sciences in 1849. In 1856, he was appointed curator of the Royal Cartographic Institute of Prussia. He died in Berlin in 1859.

In 1865, a monument to Ritter was installed at the entrance to the Bruehl in Quedlinburg. The house where he was born, number 15 Steinbrücke, was torn down in 1955. There is an additional monument at the Mummental school honoring both Ritter and his teacher Johann Christoph Friedrich GutsMuths. The Ritter Range in California is named after him.

== Works ==
The Great Work

Carl Ritter's 19 part (21 volume) masterwork, "Erdkunde im Verhältnis zur Natur und zur Geschichte des Menschen oder allgemeine, vergleichende Geographie, als sichere Grundlage des Studiums und Unterrichts in physikalischen und historischen Wissenschaften", is one of the most extensive works of geographical literature written by a single author. The first two volumes were published by G. Reimer in 1817 and 1818 respectively, after which the third would not be published until 1822. During this time, Ritter wrote and published "Vorhalle der europäischen Völkergeschichte vor Herodotus um den Kaukasus und um die Gestade des Pontus, eine Abhandlung zur Altertumskunde", which marked Ritter's interest in India. It was also to serve as a transition to a third volume of "Erdkunde" that appeared first in 1835.

In total, Ritter intended to write an all-encompassing geography spanning the entire globe. His work was to consist of three parts:

1. The solid form or the continents

2. The fluid form or the elements

3. The bodies of the three realms of nature

Part one was to undertake the continents of the globe beginning with the "Old World" and work to the "New World". The dynamic of old and new proposed here does not correspond to contemporary notions, rather refers to the evolution of human activity on the planet as Ritter understood it. Consequently, as noted by Hanno Beck, "The most extreme parts of the world, in Ritter's opinion, in the North, the South and the East are in practical terms as much a part of the New World as America". Due to the colossal scale of his project, Ritter was never able to complete it, but the final section of the first part should have concluded by recapping each continent and its "main forms and its effects on nature and history: this was to be achieved in a brief form and used as a contribution to a survey of the "great whole".

Part two was to deal with the fluid forms; by this was meant water, air, and fire. These elements correspond approximately to the studies of Hydrography, Meteorology, Climatology, as well as Volcanology. This part, too, was to be examined within the framework of the whole system.

The final part of the proposed work was to be dedicated to the interrelationships of organic life with geography and history. Part and parcel of Ritter's approach to geography was to identify the relationship between the variables at stake. He was particularly interested in the development of these relationships over time and how their constituent components (animals and the earth) contributed to this evolution. Borrowing the concept of "organic unity" used by Alexander von Humboldt, Ritter went further saying a geography is simply not possible without it.

Methodology

The methodology employed by Ritter was an inductive one, consisting of compiling large sums of information and material and creating theories from those texts. This style of research was much criticized by his contemporaries. August Wilhelm Schlegel, in a letter to Johannes Schulze, bemoans how "It is in fact the high time that the studies of Indian monuments be made serious. It is fashionable in Germany to have one's say in it without knowing the language, which leads to aberrations. We see a woeful example of this in the "Vorhalle" of otherwise estimable Ritter." As Ritter prepared for his move into Asia the sources accumulated even further, thus compounding the problem raised by Schlegel.

A consequence of his inductive research methods, Ritter was increasingly interested in observing the planet as an organism composed of geographical individuals. In the introduction of "Geography", he states, "Thus the large continents represent the surveying view of so many more or less separate wholes, which we consider here as the big individuals of the earth in general." First after identifying the individuals of the earth, and then describing them through extensive research, could Ritter conceive of a whole, whose whole is greater than the sum of its parts.

Ritter elucidates the development of a geographical individual and strives to establish a natural geographical system. Comparing Geography to language theory or philosophy, he believed that it was necessary to understand each "Erdgegend" (area of the Earth) and its characteristic appearances and natural relationships without relying on the absolute work of pure description and classification. In partitioning the Earth into "Erdgegende" he has developed a theory of area, which he views as indispensable to geographical inquiry. Furthermore, Ritter believed that areas existed a priori and were formed by humans.

Constructing a geographical theory around the area allowed Ritter to make the comparative work would seek to do in the conclusion to his great work. Elevating the importance of the area, he then investigated the peculiarities of each of the localities, remembering of course, to reflect the impact of organic life, mainly humans, on that locality. Once completed, this process would allow the last component in the method of Ritter, the comparison.

The wealth of knowledge aspired was to serve as a foundation on which comparisons could then be made between the localities or areas researched. The knowledge would have allowed a "pure science" to emerge from the exhaustive research. Inherent to Ritter's understanding of the area, is the role of God in its creation. He believed the shape of the Earth functioned as a way for God to speak with humans, so that his will could be done. God's will was the development and fulfillment of the areas created.

Format of the Work

At the time of his death, Ritter had produced an astonishing amount of geographical literature contained in his "Erdkunde" alone. It amounts to 21 volumes comprising 19 parts which can be roughly divided into 6 sections

1. Africa (I) 1822

2. East Asia (II-VI) 1818–1836

3. West Asia (VII-XI) 1837–1844

4. Arabia (XII-XIII) 1846–1847

5. Sinai Peninsula (XIV-XVII) 1847–1848

6. Asia Minor (XVIII-XIX) 1850–1852

Ritter's masterwork, the 19-volume Die Erdkunde im Verhältniss zur Natur und zur Geschichte des Menschen (Geography in Relation to Nature and the History of Mankind), written 1816–1859, developed at prodigious length the theme of the influence of the physical environment on human activity. It is an encyclopedia of geographical lore. Ritter unfolded and established the treatment of geography as a study and a science. His treatment was endorsed and adopted by all geographers.

The first volume of Die Erdkunde was completed in Berlin in 1816, and a part of it was published in the following year. The whole of the first volume did not appear until 1832, and the following volumes were issued from the press in rapid succession. Die Erdkunde was left incomplete at the time of Ritter's death, covering only Asia and Africa.

Many of Ritter's writings were printed in the Monatsberichte of the Berlin Geographical Society, and in the Zeitschrift für allgemeine Erdkunde. His Geschichte der Erdkunde und der Entdeckungen (1861), Allgemeine Erdkunde (1862), and Europa (1863) were published posthumously. Some of his works have been translated into English by W. L. Gage: Comparative Geography (1865), and The Comparative Geography of Palestine and the Sinaitic Peninsula (1866)
