= Minarets (California) =

Series of jagged peaks in the American state of California

The Minarets
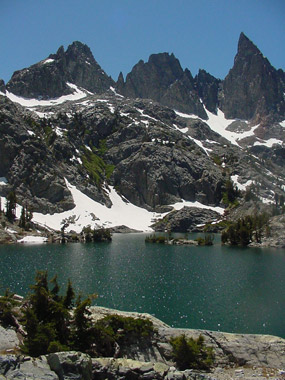
- The Minarets from Minaret Lake

Highest point
- Peak: Clyde Minaret
- Elevation: 12,270 ft (3,740 m) NAVD 88
- Prominence: 1,152 ft (351 m)
- Parent peak: Mount Ritter
- Listing: SPS Mountaineers peak
- Coordinates: 37°39′43″N 119°10′41″W

Geography
- Location within California Location within the United States
- Location: Madera County, California, U.S.
- Parent range: Ritter Range, Sierra Nevada
- Topo map: USGS Mount Ritter

Geology
- Rock age: Mid-cretaceous
- Mountain type: Metamorphic rock

Climbing
- First ascent: 1928 by Norman Clyde
- Easiest route: Rock climb class 4

The Minarets are a series of jagged peaks located in the Ritter Range, a sub-range of the Sierra Nevada in the state of California. They are easily viewed from Minaret Summit, which is accessible by auto. Collectively, they form an arête, and are a prominent feature in the Ansel Adams Wilderness which was known as the Minaret Wilderness until it was renamed in honor of Ansel Adams in 1984.

The peaks were named in 1868 by the California Geographical Survey, which reported: "To the south of Mount Ritter are some grand pinnacles of granite, very lofty and apparently inaccessible, to which we gave the name of 'the Minarets.'" Seventeen of the Minarets have been given unofficial names, including Michael Minaret, Adams Minaret, Leonard Minaret, and Clyde Minaret. Clyde Minaret, named after Norman Clyde, is the tallest of the spires. The Southeast Face Route of Clyde Minaret is a technical rock climb featured in Fifty Classic Climbs of North America.

The area is notable for two fatalities:

- Walter A. Starr, Jr., author of Starr’s Guide to the John Muir Trail and the High Sierra Region, fell to his death while solo-climbing the northwest face of Michael Minaret in 1933.
- Steve Fossett, an American aviator and adventurer, died in a plane crash near the Minarets in 2007.

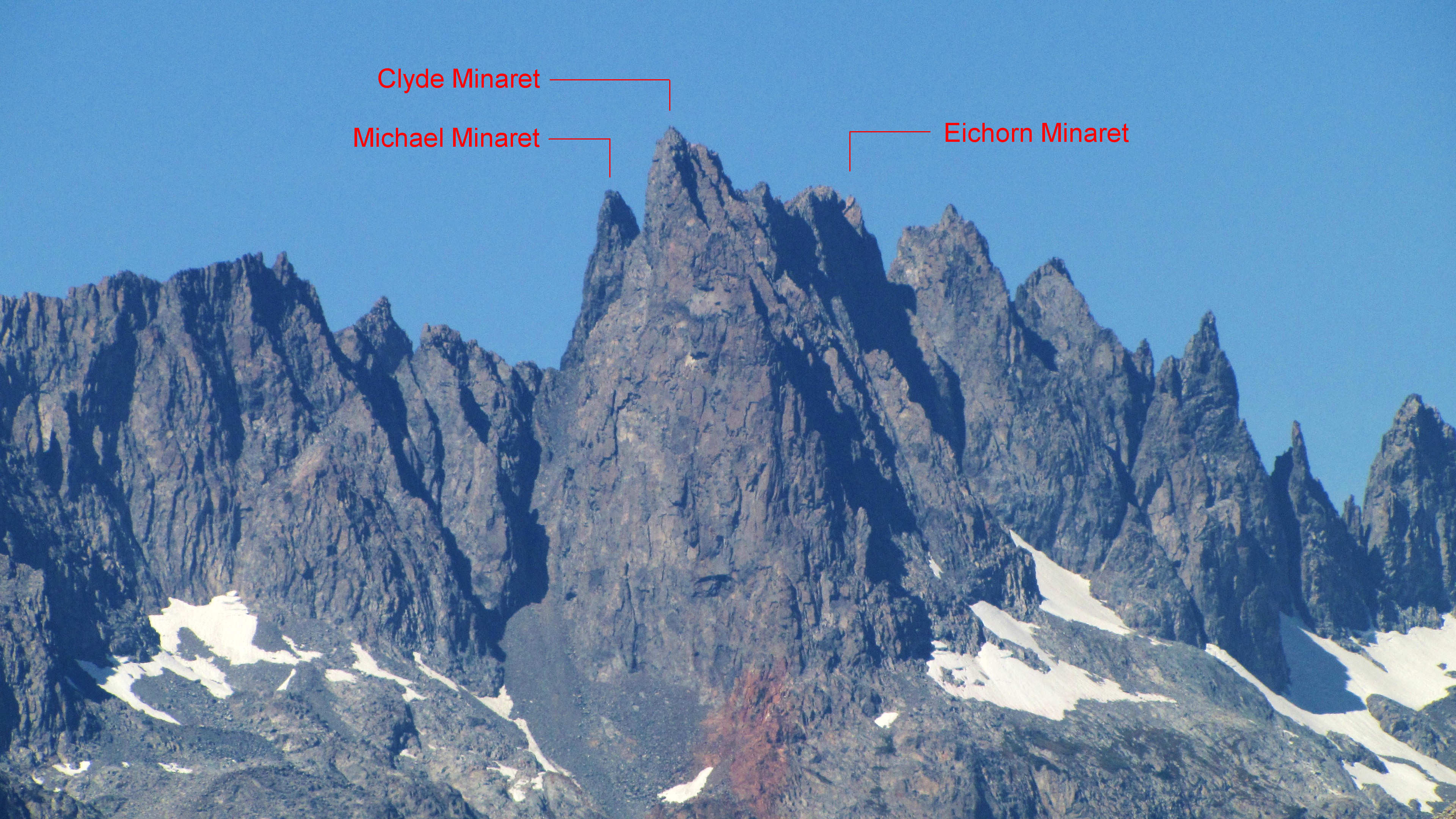
Labeled photo of individual Minarets
