= Banner Peak =

Mountain in the American state of California

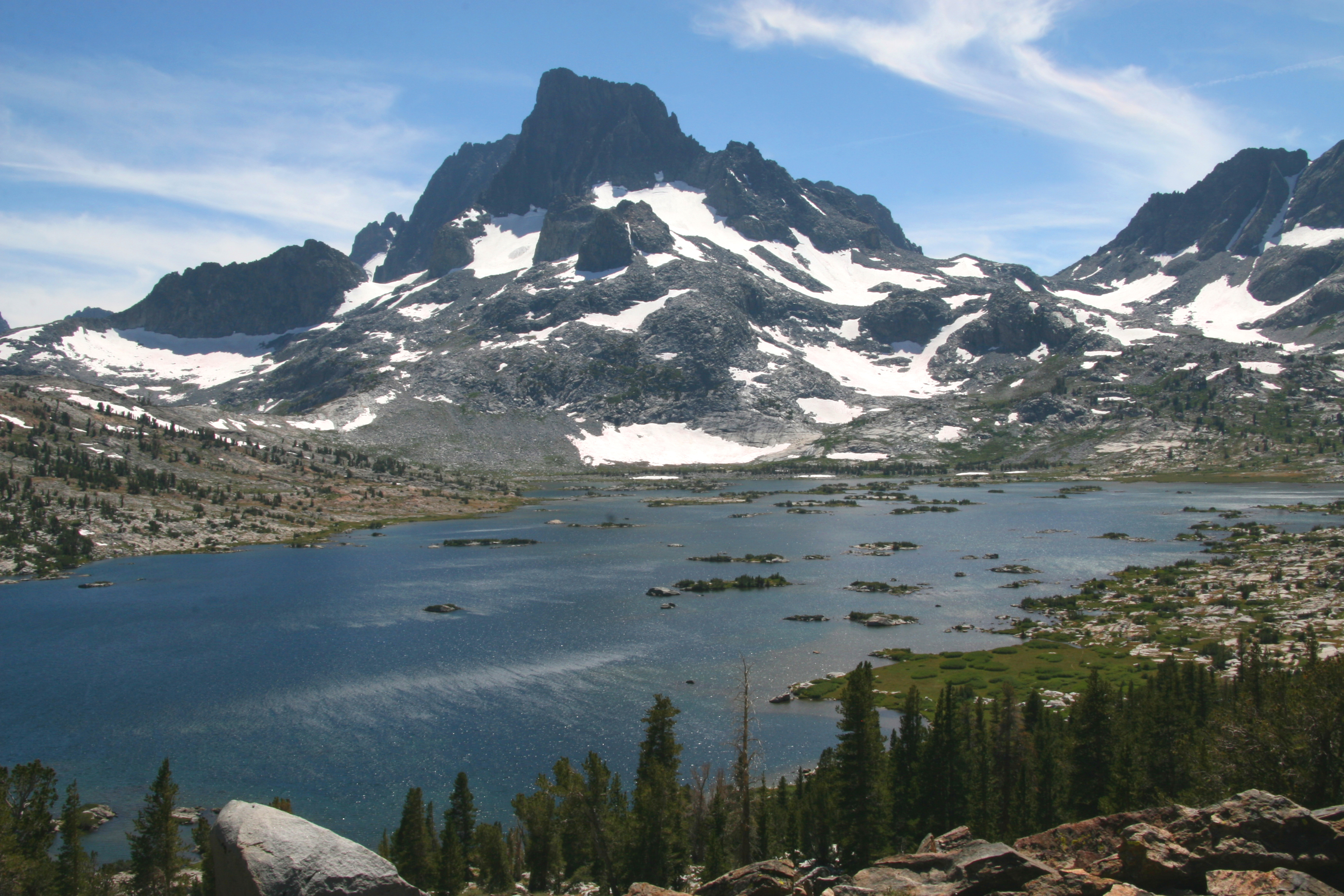
- Banner Peak from Thousand Island Lake

Highest point
- Elevation: 12,942 ft (3,945 m) NAVD 88
- Prominence: 856 ft (261 m)
- Parent peak: Mount Ritter
- Listing: Sierra Peaks Section; Western States Climbers Enblem peak
- Coordinates: 37°41′48″N 119°11′43″W

Geography
- Location within California Location within the United States
- Location: Madera County, California, U.S.
- Parent range: Ritter Range, Sierra Nevada
- Topo map: USGS Mount Ritter

Geology
- Rock age: Cretaceous
- Rock type: Metavolcanic rock

Climbing
- First ascent: 1883 by Willard D. Johnson and John Miller
- Easiest route: Scramble, class 2

Banner Peak is the second tallest peak in the Ritter Range of California's Sierra Nevada. The mountain is 12,942 feet (3,945 m) tall, and there are several glaciers on its slopes. It lies within the boundaries of the Ansel Adams Wilderness; at the foot of the peak lie Garnet Lake, Lake Ediza, and the famous Thousand Island Lake. Banner Peak is near the town of Mammoth Lakes; from there, climbers can hike to the foot of the mountain where various routes reach the summit, the easiest of which is a class 2 from the west end of Thousand Island Lake and then the saddle between Banner Peak and the slightly taller Mount Ritter. Other nearby lakes include Lake Catherine and Shadow Lake.

The peak was named in 1883 by USGS topographer Willard D. Johnson who observed a banner cloud streaming from the summit.

== Climate ==
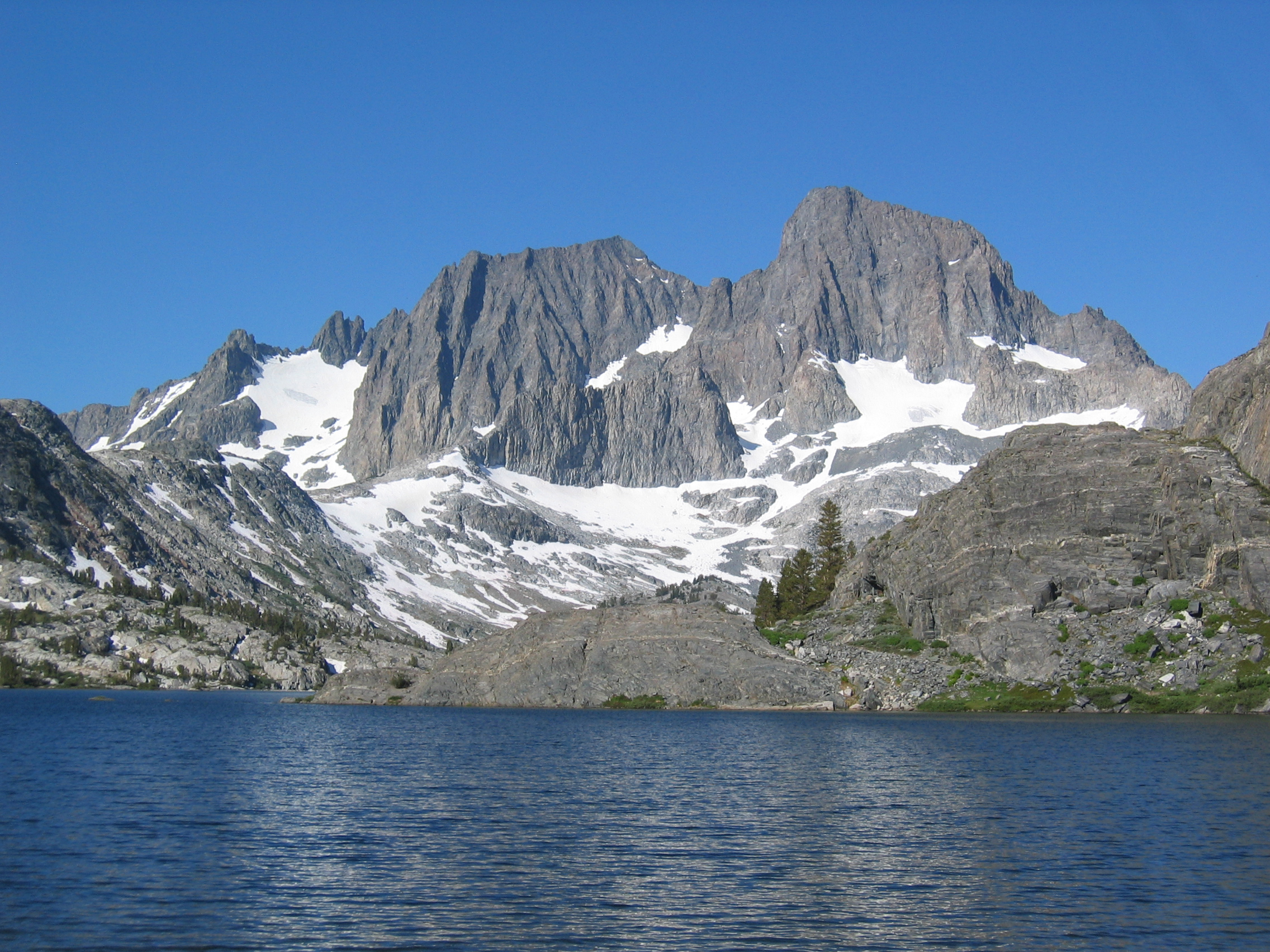
Banner Peak (right) and Mount Ritter from Garnet Lake.

According to the Köppen climate classification system, Banner Peak is located in an alpine climate zone. Most weather fronts originate in the Pacific Ocean, and travel east toward the Sierra Nevada mountains. As fronts approach, they are forced upward by the peaks (orographic lift), causing them to drop their moisture in the form of rain or snowfall onto the range.
