= Mount Ritter =

Mountain in California, United States

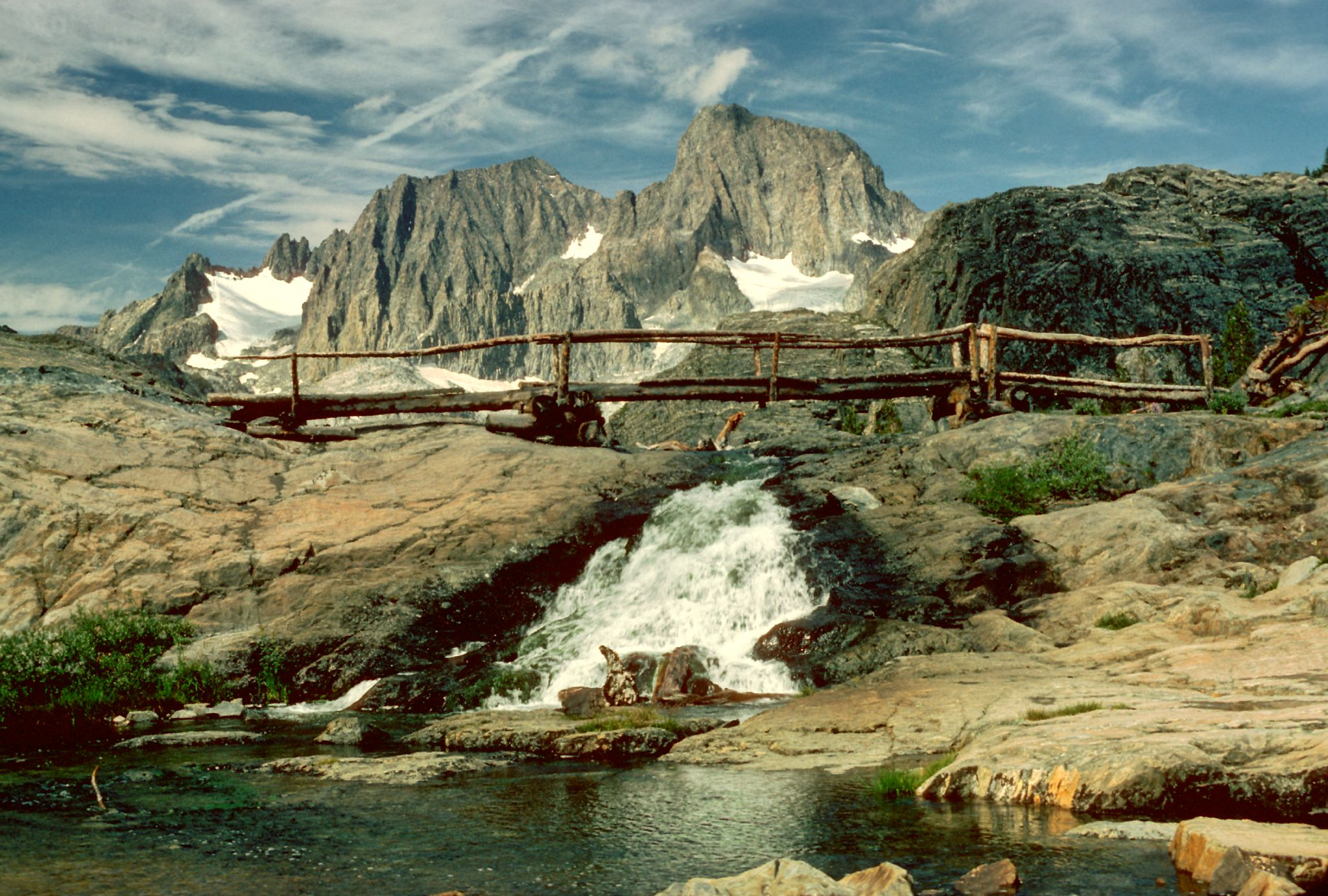
- Mount Ritter (on the left) from the John Muir Trail

Highest point
- Elevation: 13,149 ft (4,008 m) NAVD 88
- Prominence: 3,957 ft (1,206 m)
- Parent peak: Red Slate Mountain
- Isolation: 29.94 km (18.60 mi)
- Listing: North America highest peaks 124th; US highest major peaks 103rd; California highest major peaks 15th; California county high points 6th; SPS Emblem peak
- Coordinates: 37°41′22″N 119°11′57″W

Geography
- Location within California Location within the United States
- Location: Ansel Adams Wilderness, Madera County, California, U.S.
- Parent range: Ritter Range, Sierra Nevada
- Topo map: USGS Mount Ritter

Geology
- Rock age: Cretaceous
- Mountain type: Metavolcanic rock

Climbing
- First ascent: 1872 by John Muir
- Easiest route: Snow/rock scramble

Mount Ritter is the highest mountain in Madera County, California, in the Western United States, at an elevation of 13,149 feet (4,008 m). It is also the highest and most prominent peak of its namesake, the Ritter Range, a subrange of the Sierra Nevada in the Ansel Adams Wilderness of the Inyo and Sierra National Forests. Mount Ritter is the 15th highest mountain peak in California with at least 500 meters of topographic prominence.

== Geography ==
Mount Ritter is made of strikingly dark rock and is quite prominent due to its height and isolation. It is in the middle of the Ritter Range, which includes neighboring Banner Peak and the Minarets. The prominent and memorable shape of the Ritter–Banner pair is visible from high elevations far to the north and south in the Sierra Nevada.

Mount Ritter was named by Josiah Whitney, chief of the California Geological Survey, for Carl Ritter, who had been a teacher of his when he was a student in Berlin during the 1840s.

=== Climate ===
Climate data for Mount Ritter 37.6852 N, 119.2000 W, Elevation: 12,306 ft (3,751 m) (1991–2020 normals)
Month	Jan	Feb	Mar	Apr	May	Jun	Jul	Aug	Sep	Oct	Nov	Dec	Year
Mean daily maximum °F (°C)	28.7 (−1.8)	27.4 (−2.6)	30.1 (−1.1)	34.3 (1.3)	41.9 (5.5)	51.5 (10.8)	59.4 (15.2)	58.9 (14.9)	53.4 (11.9)	44.6 (7.0)	34.8 (1.6)	28.6 (−1.9)	41.1 (5.1)
Daily mean °F (°C)	19.3 (−7.1)	17.4 (−8.1)	19.6 (−6.9)	22.7 (−5.2)	29.7 (−1.3)	39.1 (3.9)	46.5 (8.1)	45.8 (7.7)	40.5 (4.7)	32.6 (0.3)	24.9 (−3.9)	19.5 (−6.9)	29.8 (−1.2)
Mean daily minimum °F (°C)	10.0 (−12.2)	7.4 (−13.7)	9.1 (−12.7)	11.2 (−11.6)	17.6 (−8.0)	26.6 (−3.0)	33.6 (0.9)	32.7 (0.4)	27.5 (−2.5)	20.7 (−6.3)	15.0 (−9.4)	10.4 (−12.0)	18.5 (−7.5)
Average precipitation inches (mm)	11.94 (303)	9.36 (238)	8.97 (228)	5.18 (132)	2.76 (70)	0.70 (18)	0.53 (13)	0.37 (9.4)	0.48 (12)	2.93 (74)	4.11 (104)	10.03 (255)	57.36 (1,456.4)
Source: PRISM Climate Group

== See also ==
- List of highest points in California by county
