= Ritter Range =

Mountain in the American state of California

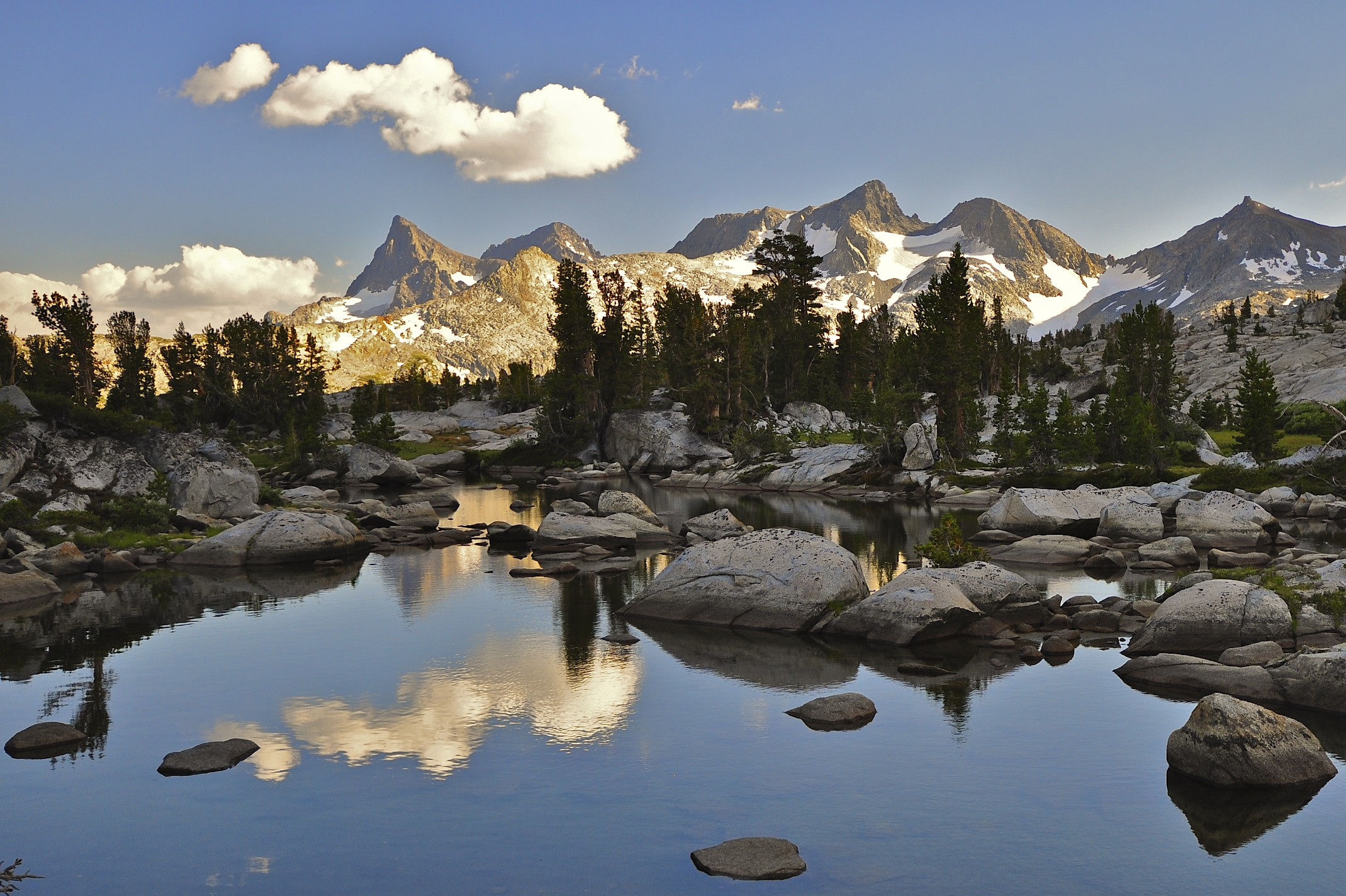
- Mount Davis and the Ritter Range

Highest point
- Peak: Mount Ritter
- Elevation: 13,143 ft (4,006 m)

Dimensions
- Length: 15 mi (24 km) NS
- Width: 9 mi (14 km) EW

Geography
- Location within California
- Country: United States
- State: California
- Region: Ansel Adams Wilderness
- County: Madera County
- Range coordinates: 37°41′38″N 119°11′53″W
- Parent range: Sierra Nevada

Geology
- Rock age: Cretaceous

The Ritter Range is a small mountain range within California's Sierra Nevada. Most of the mountain range lies within the Ansel Adams Wilderness.

The John Muir Trail passes by many lakes within the Ritter Range. The most prominent peaks of the Ritter Range are Mount Ritter, at 13,143 feet, Banner Peak, at 12,936 feet, Rodgers Peak, and the Minarets, a group of sharp peaks south of Mt. Ritter. Thousand Island Lake, Ediza Lake, Garnet Lake, Lake Catherine, Minaret Lake, Cecile Lake, and Shadow Lake all lie within the Ritter Range, and are accessible by trail.

The range is named for Carl Ritter, who had been a teacher of Josiah Whitney when he was a student in Berlin in the 1840s."

The Ritter Range, near the Minarets and Minaret Lake, was the site of the plane crash of Steve Fossett in 2007.

== See also ==
- Volcanic Ridge
- Iron Mountain
