= Ansel Adams Wilderness =

Protected wilderness area in California, United States

- IUCN category Ib (wilderness area)
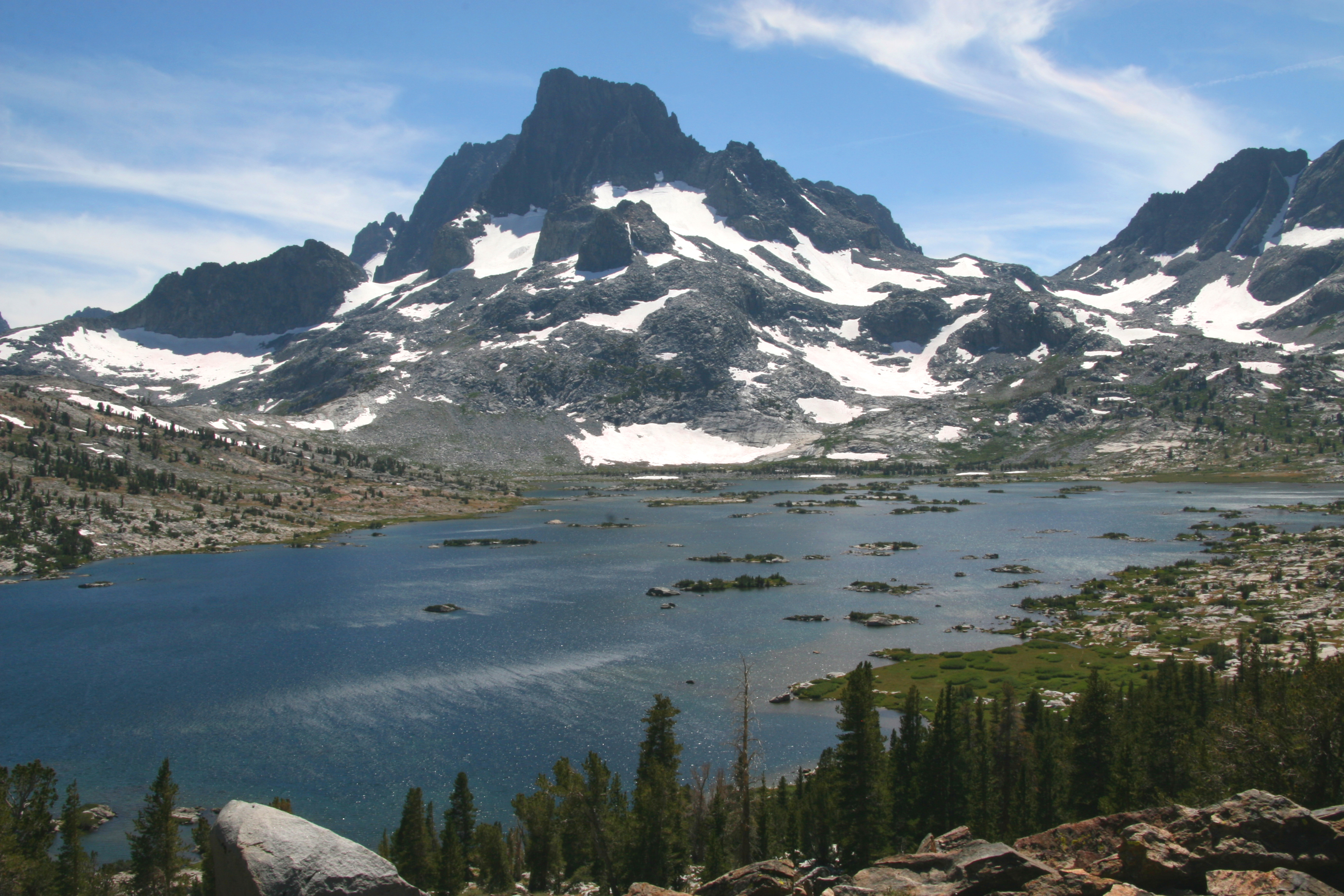
- Banner Peak above Thousand Island Lake

- Location within California Location within the United States
- Interactive map of Ansel Adams Wilderness
- Location: Madera / Fresno / Mono counties, California, United States
- Nearest city: Fresno, CA
- Coordinates: 37°41′N 119°11′W
- Area: 231,533 acres (936.98 km^{2})
- Created: 1964
- Governing body: U.S. Forest Service

The Ansel Adams Wilderness is a wilderness area in the Sierra Nevada of California, United States. The wilderness spans 231,533 acres (93,698 ha); 33.9% of the territory lies in the Inyo National Forest, 65.8% is in the Sierra National Forest, and the remaining 0.3% covers nearly all of Devils Postpile National Monument. Yosemite National Park lies to the north and northwest, while the John Muir Wilderness lies to the south.

== History ==
The wilderness was established as part of the original Wilderness Act in 1964 as the Minarets Wilderness. The 109,500-acre (44,300 ha) Minarets Wilderness was created by enlarging and renaming the Mount Dana-Minarets Primitive Area.

In 1984, after his death, the area was expanded and renamed in memory of Ansel Adams, well-known environmentalist and nature photographer who is famous for his black-and-white landscape photographs of the Sierra Nevada.

== Geography and geology ==
The Ansel Adams wilderness spans in elevation from 3,500 to 13,157 feet (1,067 to 4,010 m), forming the northern end of the High Sierra.

The centerpiece of the Ansel Adams wilderness is the Ritter Range, which includes dark metavolcanic glaciated mountains such as Mount Ritter, Banner Peak, and The Minarets.

Immediately to the east of the Ritter Range is the Middle Fork of the San Joaquin River, which contains Devils Postpile, a series of basaltic columns that were revealed and smoothed by glacier action. The Middle Fork originates from Thousand Island Lake, at the foot of Banner Peak, one of the largest backcountry lakes in the Sierra.

To the east of the Middle Fork canyon is the true Sierra Crest, which, at roughly 10,000 feet (3,000 m) of elevation is lower than the Ritter Range. This relatively low region of the Crest allows winter storms through and cause large amounts of snowfall on Mammoth Mountain, which sits in the gap. The gap also allows migration of plants and animals across the Sierra Crest.

To the west of the Ritter Range lies the canyon of the North Fork of the San Joaquin, a relatively remote and unvisited high-country area. The southern part of the wilderness contains the 3,000 feet (900 m) deep canyon of the main San Joaquin River, which flows out of the Sierra Nevada to California's Central Valley.

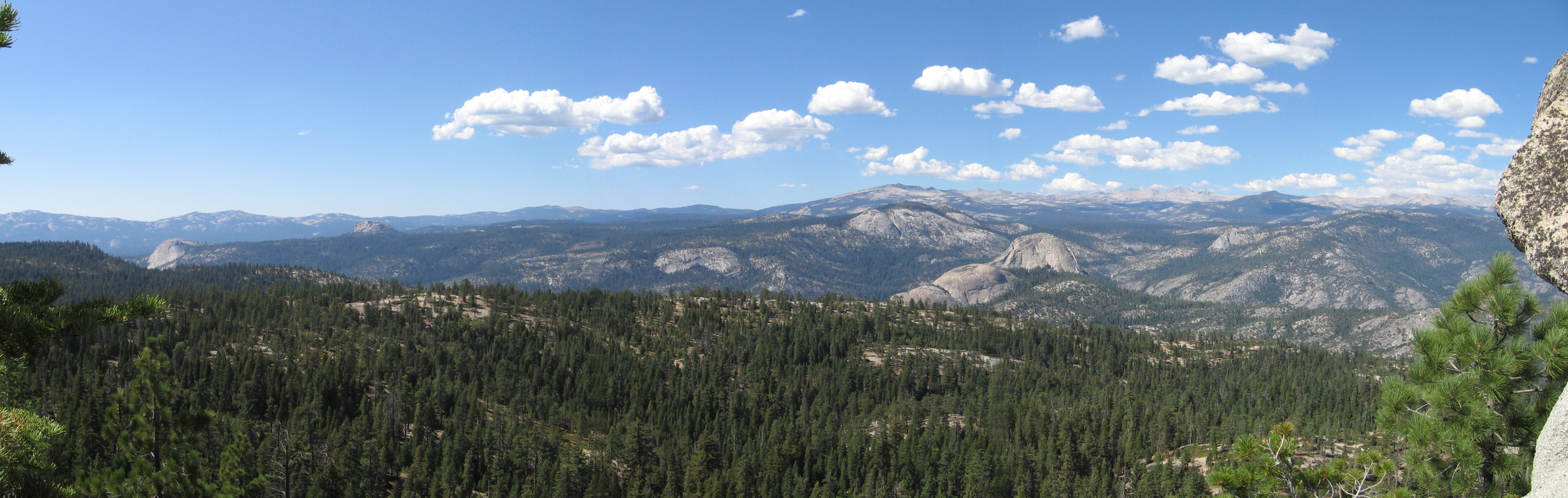
Ansel Adams Wilderness

== Climate ==
Climate data for Gem Lake, California
Month	Jan	Feb	Mar	Apr	May	Jun	Jul	Aug	Sep	Oct	Nov	Dec	Year
Mean daily maximum °F (°C)	37.1 (2.8)	38.5 (3.6)	44.5 (6.9)	50.2 (10.1)	57.6 (14.2)	64.8 (18.2)	73.2 (22.9)	71.3 (21.8)	64.5 (18.1)	54.9 (12.7)	45.8 (7.7)	38.4 (3.6)	53.4 (11.9)
Mean daily minimum °F (°C)	14.8 (−9.6)	14.7 (−9.6)	18.3 (−7.6)	24.3 (−4.3)	31.9 (−0.1)	39.6 (4.2)	47.7 (8.7)	47.2 (8.4)	40.3 (4.6)	32.9 (0.5)	25.1 (−3.8)	19.1 (−7.2)	29.7 (−1.3)
Average precipitation inches (mm)	3.63 (92)	3.66 (93)	2.92 (74)	1.62 (41)	0.86 (22)	0.49 (12)	0.55 (14)	0.59 (15)	0.70 (18)	1.14 (29)	2.11 (54)	3.18 (81)	21.45 (545)
Average snowfall inches (cm)	33.2 (84)	40.6 (103)	26.3 (67)	15.7 (40)	4.3 (11)	1.1 (2.8)	0 (0)	0 (0)	1.1 (2.8)	6.9 (18)	16.8 (43)	34.1 (87)	180.1 (458.6)
Source: WRCC, Period of Record: 1924-2010

== Ecology ==
The Ansel Adams wilderness contains substantial area above treeline, at approximately 9,600 to 10,400 feet (2,900 to 3,200 m). The area above treeline contains alpine meadows and fellfields, with a large number of glacial lakes. Below treeline, the wilderness is dominated by lodgepole pine, red fir, and Jeffrey pine, depending on elevation.

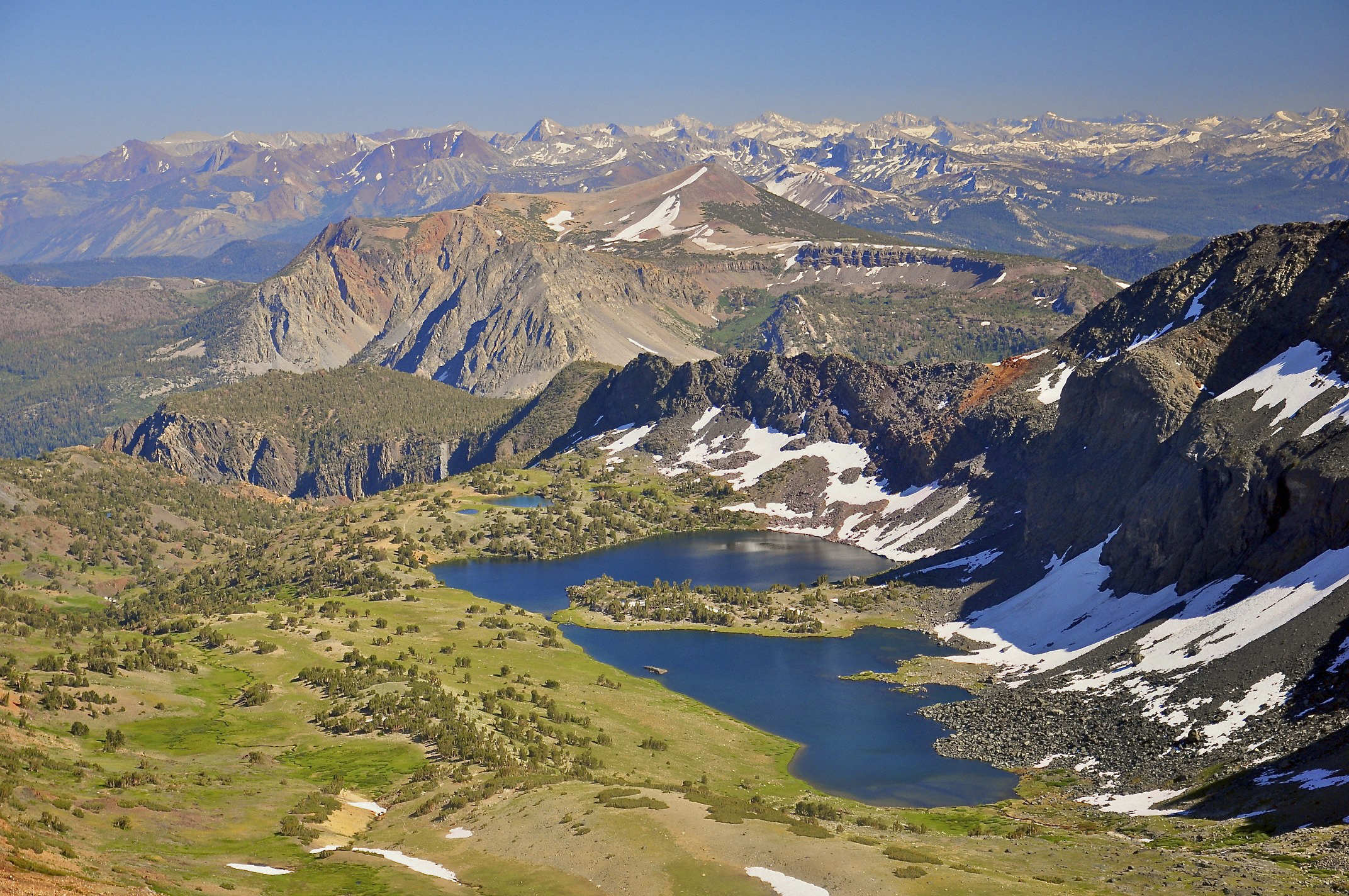
Alger Lakes and Mount San Joaquin in the northern end of the wilderness

== Recreation ==
The wilderness contains 349 miles (562 km) of hiking trails, including portions of the John Muir and Pacific Crest Trails. The Sierra High Route, an off-trail route described by Steve Roper, runs along the base of the Ritter Range, through the wilderness.

The Middle Fork of the San Joaquin receives the most visitors: a mandatory bus is required for visitors to reach Devils Postpile from the Mammoth Mountain Ski Area during the summer.

The Minarets are a well-known area for technical rock climbing.

Winter brings various cross-country ski possibilities, accessible from both Mammoth Mountain and the June Mountain ski area.

== See also ==
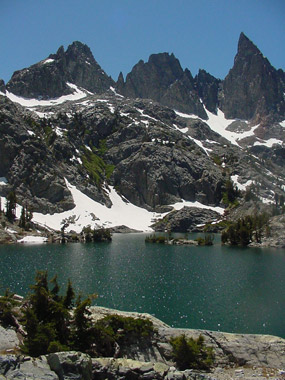
Minaret Lake in the Ansel Adams Wilderness area

- Bibliography of the Sierra Nevada, for further reading
