= Kuna Crest Granodiorite =

Granodiorite in Yosemite National Park, USA

- Stratigraphic range: 91 Ma
- Type: Geological formation

Lithology
- Primary: Granodiorite

Location
- Region: Yosemite National Park
- Country: United States

Type section
- Named for: Kuna Crest
- A geologic map of Yosemite National Park

Kuna Crest Granodiorite (also called Granodiorite of Glen Aulin), is found, in Yosemite National Park, United States. The granodiorite forms part of the Tuolumne Intrusive Suite (aka Tuolumne Batholith), one of the four major intrusive suites within the Sierra Nevada. Of the Tuolumne Intrusive Suite, it is the oldest and darkest rock.

Kuna Crest granodiorite forms most of the outer part of the Tuolumne Intrusive Suite, on the edges.

== Name ==
The word Kuna probably derives from a Shoshonean word, with a meaning "fire," appearing in the Mono dialect of the area, with meaning of firewood. The rocks on Kuna Peak can be a red color and Kuna Peak is the highest point on Kuna Crest. Kuna Crest granodiorite was first identified on Kuna Crest, from which Kuna Peak rises.

== Geology ==
Kuna Crest Granodiorite makes up most of the outer part of the Tuolumne Intrusive Suite. Of the Tuolumne Intrusive Suite, it is the most melanocratic of the granodiorites containing many mafic microgranular enclaves. It is fine- to medium-grained (0.1–4 mm). The mafic minerals are generally oriented and define a foliation.

Plagioclase is its most abundant mineral and is generally in euhedral crystals with rare inclusions. Thus plagioclase is viewed the first phase to crystallize from the magma.

The cores of some crystals are irregularly shaped, and have more sodium than outer parts. There is evidence that magma producing Kuna Crest Granodiorite mixed with other magmas.

Magnetite crystals and those of titanite in the Kuna Crest granodiorite are usually euhedral, and occur in aggregates. So, they are interpreted to be early phases (primocrysts), who crystallized together. The magnetite crystals are smaller (~0.1–0.5 mm) than those of titanite (~0.5–3 mm). The titanite crystals commonly display compositional zoning. The biotite crystals are 1–3 mm across, being more or less euhedral; but they contain small inclusions of titanite and magnetite, indicating that biotite crystallization began after them.

The distinguishing feature of the Kuna Crest granodiorite is the presence of anhedral crystals of hornblende abounding in inclusions of the other minerals. So hornblende might have been the last mafic primocryst mineral to have finished growing.

Between the other crystals, the last minerals to crystallize were K-feldspar and quartz. So the quartz is denoted interstitial quartz. These have all axes of the same length (1–3 mm), and are anhedral, and show no evidence of significant post-crystallization strain.

Apatite and zircon are common accessory minerals, and occur as relatively euhedral crystals. Because none of the mafic minerals are fractured or bent and the interstitial quartz keeps all axes the same length, the strong orientation shown by the euhedral minerals and the hornblende is viewed to be a magmatic foliation. The absence of well-balanced, 120° facial angles between the minerals indicates that no major readjustment of the grain boundaries took place after the magma had crystallized.

Estimates from petrographic observation of average mineral proportion of non-layered rocks of Kuna Crest granodiorite follows:

Mineral	Its percentage
Plagioclase	40%
Quartz	20%
Biotite	15%
K-feldspar	9%
Hornblende	15%
Titanite	0.5%
Magnetite	0.5%

Of the Tuolumne Intrusive Suite, in Kuna Crest granodiorite, the proportion of the mafic minerals is greatest, at 21%. The abundance of light rare earth elements (the cerium group of elements) is similar in Half Dome Granodiorite and Cathedral Peak Granodiorite, but is lowest in Kuna Crest granodiorite.

== Where it is found ==
Kuna Crest granodiorite is tied to Kuna Peak, also in Yosemite, and Kuna Crest, being first identified on Kuna Crest, from which Kuna Peak rises.

It is exposed at Glacier Point, and is found, on the east end of Yosemite Valley. It is also found on the west side of the pluton and near Tioga Pass on the east side of the Sierra Nevada batholith. It is found, on Kuna Crest.

It is also found near May Lake, though till covers it.

== Its age ==
It is about 91 million years old, the oldest granodiorite of the Tuolumne Meadows area.

== See also ==
- Cathedral Peak Granodiorite
- El Capitan Granite
- Geology of the Yosemite area
- Half Dome Granodiorite
- Johnson Granite Porphyry
- Kuna Crest
- Sentinel granodiorite
- Tuolumne Intrusive Suite
