= Cathedral Peak Granodiorite =

Suite of intrusive rock in the Sierra Nevada

- Stratigraphic range: 88-87 Ma
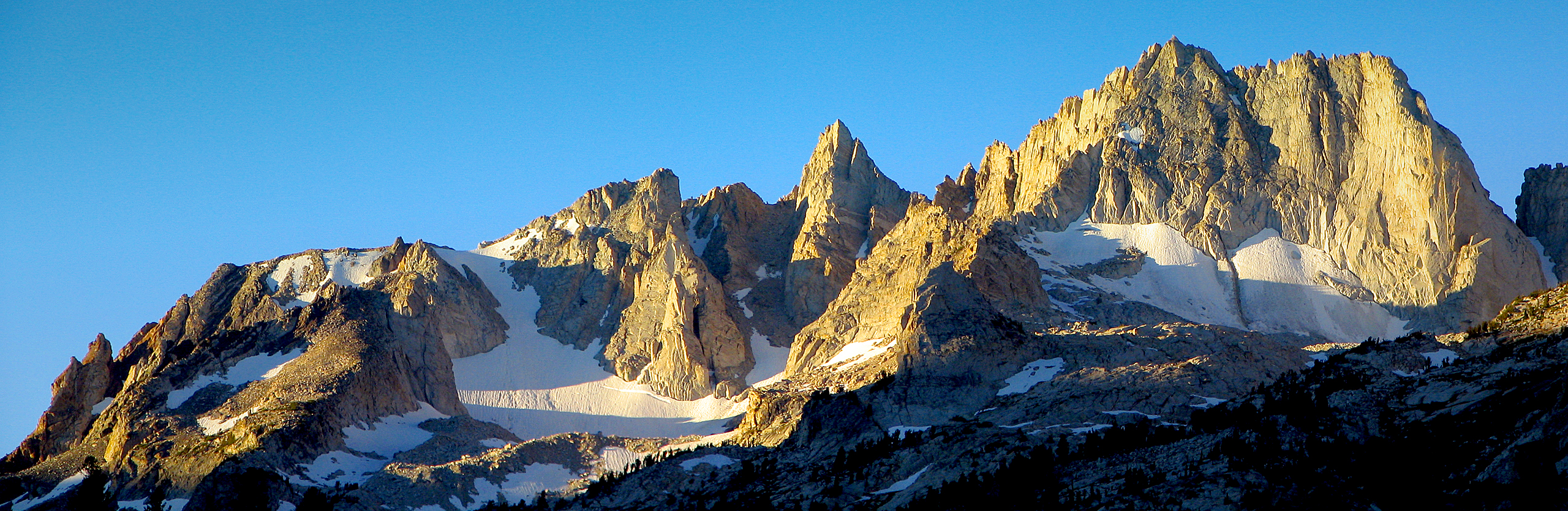
- Matterhorn Peak consists of Cathedral Peak Granodiorite
- Type: Geological formation

Lithology
- Primary: Granodiorite

Location
- Region: Yosemite National Park
- Country: United States

Type section
- Named for: Cathedral Peak
- A geologic map of Yosemite National Park

The Cathedral Peak Granodiorite (CPG) was named after its type locality, Cathedral Peak in Yosemite National Park, California. The granodiorite forms part of the Tuolumne Intrusive Suite (Tuolumne Batholith), one of the four major intrusive suites within the Sierra Nevada. It has been assigned radiometric ages between 88 and 87 million years and therefore reached its cooling stage in the Coniacian (Upper Cretaceous).

== Geographic situation ==
The Cathedral Peak Granodiorite forms part of the central eastern Sierra Nevada in California. It is exposed in glaciated outcrops from the upper Yosemite Valley into the high Sierra Divide. It covers large parts of Mariposa County and Tuolumne County and also touches Madera County and Mono County. At its northern end it includes Tower Peak and Matterhorn Peak, at 12,264 feet (3743 m) its highest elevation. In its southwestern section rises the Cathedral Range with the 10,911 feet Cathedral Peak (3326 m) above Tuolumne Meadows. California State Route 120 traverses the granodiorite in its southern half. Due to the block-faulting and tilting of the Sierra Nevada to the west its drainage system is oriented to the west and follows mainly southwesterly courses, especially in the northern section.

The shape of the intrusion is a drawn-out rectangle or ellipse oriented roughly in the NNW-SSE-direction. Its long dimension measures about 30 miles (48 km), its width hardly reaches 12 miles (19 km) at the northern end. The surface area amounts to about 230 square miles (600 km^{2}), roughly half of the total area of the Tuolumne Intrusive Suite. The granodiorite completely engulfs the Johnson Granite Porphyry in the south. It is surrounded in the southeast, southwest and northwest by the Half Dome Granodiorite. In its central belt region it touches the Kuna Crest Granodiorite. In the north and northeast it comes into contact with weakly metamorphosed country rocks, mainly Paleozoic and Jurassic metavolcanics and metasediments.

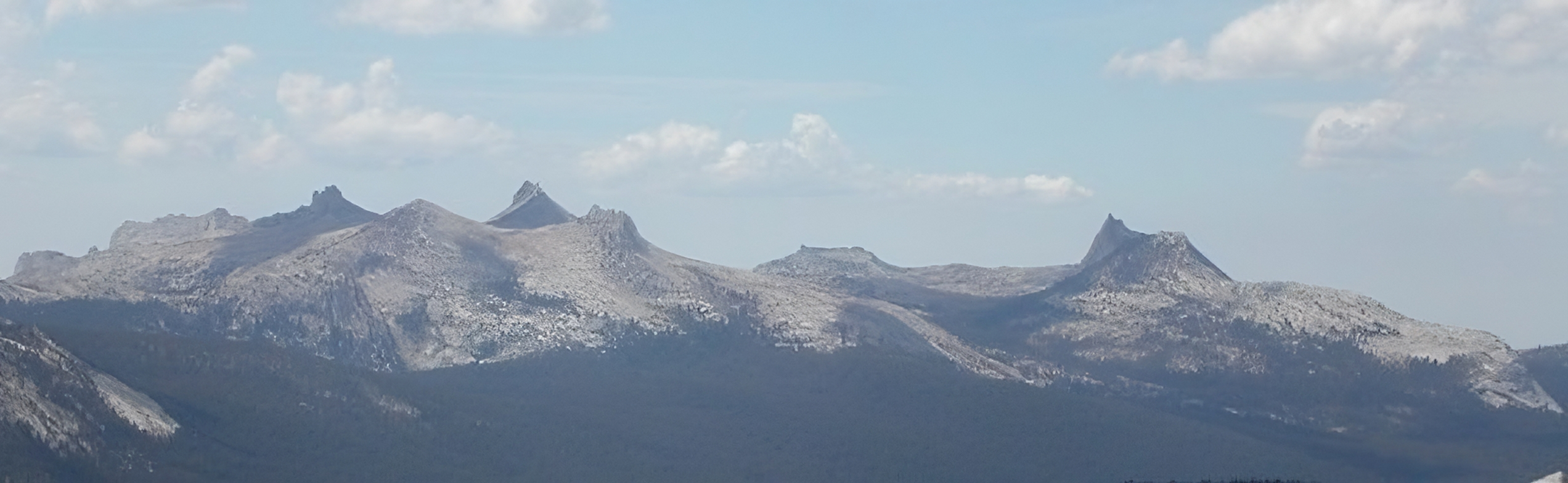
The Cathedral Range is shaped from Cathedral Peak Granodiorite.

== Geological overview ==
Geologic map of the Yosemite National Park: Cathedral Peak Granodiorite

The Cathedral Peak Granodiorite is the third and most important intrusive pulse of the Tuolumne Intrusive Suite. The intrusions of this magmatic suite were spaced out over quite a long period. They started in the Turonian at about 93.5 million years BP and lasted right to the beginning of the Santonian at 85.4 million years BP. Radiometric dating of the cooling ages of the Cathedral Peak Granodiorite yielded 88.1 ± 0.2 down to 87.0 ± 0.7 million years BP, i.e. Coniacian.

The Tuolumne Intrusive Suite is accompanied by other major intrusive complexes in the Sierra Nevada: the John Muir and Mount Whitney intrusive suites, both further south and the Sonora Plutonic Complex to the north. The surface area of these four complexes surpasses 970 square miles (2,500 km^{2}).

The Tuolumne Intrusive Suite was constructed over a long time span of 8.1 million years by the following magmatic pulses (ordered by increasing age):

- Johnson Granite Porphyry
- Cathedral Peak Granodiorite
- Half Dome Granodiorite, further subdivided into a porphyritic and an equigranular facies
- Kuna Crest Granodiorite – quartz diorite and granodiorite

This magmatic sequence shows the following geochronological and geochemical trends:

- decreasing age from the margin to the center, with the marginal Kuna Crest Granodiorte being the oldest magmatic pulse and the central Johnson Granite Porphyry the youngest.
- an increase in silica and alkali contents from rim to center, the composition of the rocks changing from mafic/intermediate to more felsic compositions.
- an increase in rubidium contents from rim to center.
- a steady decrease in Al_{2}O_{3}, TiO_{2}, FeO, MgO and CaO contents.
- a decrease in barium, strontium and light rare earth elements such as scandium.

== Petrological description ==
The immediately apparent trait of the grey-white Cathedral Peak Granodiorite is its porphyritic habit with very large megacrysts of alkali feldspar commonly reaching 10, occasionally even 20 centimeters. The grain size of the groundmass stays in the 5 millimeter range.

=== Mineralogy ===
The Cathedral Peak Granodiorite is modally composed of the following minerals:

- plagioclase – 47.5 volume percent. Present as subhedral to euhedral, tabular oligoclase with An_{27–29}. Shows normal zoning with calcium-rich cores and sodium-rich rims. Exhibits simple carlsbad and albite twinning. Grain size varies between 1 and 15 millimeters. Can be cataclastically broken and infiltrated/replaced by microcline in shear zone.
- alkali feldspar – 20.9 volume percent. Present as blocky, perthitic orthoclase with Or_{88}. Phenocrysts with grain sizes up to 20 centimeters in length, normal range up to 10 centimeters, 2 centimeters wide. Exhibit carlsbad twinning. Grain size and abundance of the phenocrysts decreases inwards towards the Johnson Granite Porphyry. The megacrysts engulf (poikilitically enclose) other smaller minerals such as biotite, hornblende, plagioclase and alkali feldspar due to a rapid growth rate. Cracks have been filled with opaque minerals, bigger fractures are in-filled with groundmass material. The surface is fractured with irregular edges. Some grains show signs of secondary alteration to clay minerals. Alkali feldspar occurs interstitially also in the fine- to medium-grained groundmass.
- quartz – 25.9 volume percent. Equidimensional subhedral crystals of medium grain size (10 millimeter).
- biotite – 3.5 volume percent. Equidimensional and subhedral. Main mafic constituent. Shows strong brown pleochroism, occasionally with pleochroic halos.
- hornblende – 0.8 volume percent.
- apatite – 0.3 volume percent. Prismatic crystals.
- titanite. Irregular fine-grained crystals. Can appear in euhedral habit.
- opaque ore minerals such as ilmenite and magnetite – 0.6 volume percent.
- accessories such as allanite and zircon.
- myrmekite in shear zone.

=== Chemical composition ===
The following analyses by Bateman & Chappell and an average value from 18 analyses by Burgess & Miller are meant to demonstrate the chemical composition of the Cathedral Peak Granodiorite:

| Oxide Weight % | Bateman & Chappell | Average Burgess & Miller | CIPW Norm Percent | Bateman & Chappell | Average | Trace elements ppm | Average Burgess & Miller |
|---|---|---|---|---|---|---|---|
| SiO_{2} | 69,60 | 70,29 (67,0–72,0) | Q | 24,52 | 25,58 | Pb | 17,5 (15–20) |
| TiO_{2} | 0,38 | 0,41 (0,3–0,6) | Or | 21,67 | 20,64 | Cu | 4,9 (3,2 – 6,9) |
| Al_{2}O_{3} | 15,34 | 15,37 (15,0–16,5) | Ab | 36,79 | 35,81 | Ni | 3,0 (0,7 – 6) |
| Fe_{2}O_{3} | 1,30 | 1,40 | An | 11,85 | 12,57 | Cr | 3,3 (0–24) |
| FeO | 0,95 | 1,03 | Di | 0,57 | 0,37 | V | 41,4 (23–50) |
| MnO | 0,06 | 0,06 (0,5–0,8) | Hy | 1,63 | 1,82 | Zr | 135,9 (82–165) |
| MgO | 0,70 | 0,72 (0,6–0,9) | Mt | 1,87 | 2,01 | Y | 8,3 (4,9 – 11) |
| CaO | 2,68 | 2,82 (2,2–3,2) | Il | 0,73 | 0,77 | Sr | 633,2 (487–758) |
| Na_{2}O | 4,31 | 4,24 (4,0–4,5) | Ap | 0,32 | 0,36 | Ba | 748,0 (410–1182) |
| K_{2}O | 3,64 | 3,50 (2,8–4,2) | | | | Rb | 132,5 (114–166) |
| P_{2}O_{5} | 0,14 | 0,16 (0,12–0,20) | | | | Nb | 7,8 (4,9 – 10) |
| Mg# | 0,55 | 0,54 | | | | Sc | 3,6 (1,7 – 4,5) |
| A'/F | 0,08 | 0,11 | | | | Ga | 20,9 (19–23) |
| Al/K+Na+Ca | 0,96 | 0,97 | | | | Zn | 57,8 (38–65) |

Compared with an average granodiorite the Cathedral Peak Granodiorite has a much higher silica content, shows elevated alkali values and is therefore a member of the shoshonitic high-K series. The rock is metaluminous, rich in sodium and belongs to the intrusive, mantle source-derived I-type granitoids. It is a typical calc-alkaline rock from the root zone of an ancient volcanic arc and associated with a subduction-type environment.

The trace elements demonstrate an enrichment in barium and strontium, nickel and chromium on the other hand have very low concentrations. The light rare earth elements LREE are also elevated but without a europium anomaly.

Another source gives: Estimates from petrographic observation of average mineral proportion of non-layered rocks of Half Dome Granodiorite:

| Mineral | Its percentage |
|---|---|---|
| Plagioclase | 45% |
| Quartz | 28% |
| Biotite | 5% |
| K-feldspar | 20% | (15% megacryst, 5% interstitial) % |
| Hornblende | 1% |
| Titanite | 0.5% |
| Magnetite | 0.5% |

== Structures ==
The Cathedral Peak Granodiorite reveals the following structures of magmatic origin:

- Layering underlined by the accumulation of hornblende and biotite. Two magmatic foliations can be observed:
  - a major NNW-SSE-striking, steeply dipping foliation bearing a steep lineation.
  - a secondary ESE-WNW-striking foliation.
- Schlieren generally strike NNW-SSE (N 157 – with local deviations up to 50 °) and show a fairly steep dip of about 60 ° to the ENE.
- Ladder dikes represent tubular, locally confined magmatic upwellings. These structures are sometimes displaced by later magmatic motions.
- Microgranitoid inclusions are similar in their mineralogy to the host rock, yet contain a higher percentage of mafic minerals like hornblende and biotite. Phenocrysts are plagioclase and hornblende with a grain size of 5 to 8 millimeter. The inclusions are sometimes surrounded by up to 3 centimeter wide felsic rims. Their mode of occurrence is singular or in clusters without a preferred direction.
- Aplites form one to three centimeter wide dykes. Their mineralogy is fine-grained and homogeneous. They cut through all other structures with mostly sharp contacts. Larger dykes can host pegmatitic cores of quartz, plagioclase and alkali feldspar. Smaller splaying dyke terminations can end in a diffuse fashion in the host rock.
- Displacements in the magmatic state which can affect schlieren, ladder dykes and also the homogeneous granodiorite. They are later healed by aplitic material and concentrations of alkali feldspar. Displacements in schlieren are flat-lying, obliquely sinistral and show top to the WSW motion.

Structures that imply tectonic movements are signs of cataclasis:

- on magmatic plagioclases
- on groundmass minerals like quartz
- along the edges of microcline phenocrysts

Structures that strongly hint at later-stage metasomatic changes are:

- myrmekite
- substitution of primary plagioclase by microcline

Taken together all these structural phenomena reveal a very complex evolution of the Cathedral Peak Granodiorite showing the succession of magmatic, tectonic and metasomatic stages – and most likely their occasional synergy and interdependence.

== Formation and origin ==
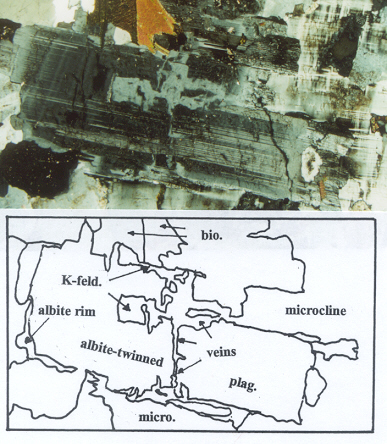
Thin section view of cataclastically broken, albite-twinned plagioclase is invaded by microcline

Originally petrologists favoured a single magma chamber model for the genesis of the Tuolumne Intrusive Suite which underwent fractional crystallization and successively produced the different rock types like the Cathedral Peak Granodiorite. This somewhat simplistic model is now being questioned as underlined by the following facts:

- the extremely long activity of this magma chamber protracted over 8.1 million years.
- inconsistencies in the distribution of the trace elements and in the initial isotope ratios of strontium and neodymium.

Isotope ratios favour the mixing of two magmas, one with mantle affinities and another one with more felsic compositions approaching the Johnson Granite Porphyry in composition.

Thermobarometric data document an intrusion depth of 6 kilometers and a crystallization temperature range between 750 and 660 °C.

Feldspars, hornblende, biotite and magnetite often show unmixing in the lower temperature subsolidus region.

The Cathedral Peak Granodiorite cannot always be clearly distinguished from the porphyritic Half Dome Granodiorite in the field, at some places it shows gradual merging over about a hundred meters and apophyses are observed branching into the Half Dome rocks. The geochemical parameters of the two granodiorites also overlap, differences are mainly textural. They form a continuum and therefore cannot be clearly separated as two distinctive intrusive pulses. The contact relationships with the Johnson Granite Porphyry are on the other hand sharp.

The origin of the microcline in shear zones poses another problem. M.D. Higgins favours the possibility of recrystallization based on Ostwald ripening via metasomatic fluids. L.G. Collins supports a metasomatic subsolidus growth (potassium- and silica-metasomatism) that has been initiated by ongoing tectonic cataclasis. To be fully effective this process is dependent on the cataclastic breaking-up of the original crystals as realized in a ductile shear zone along the eastern edge of the Cathedral Peak Granodiorite (Gem Lake Shear Zone).

== See also ==
- El Capitan Granite
- Geology of the Yosemite area
- Johnson Granite Porphyry
- Half Dome Granodiorite
- Kuna Crest Granodiorite
- Sentinel granodiorite
