= Sentinel granodiorite =

Type of rock found in Yosemite National Park, USA

- Stratigraphic range: 93-85 Ma
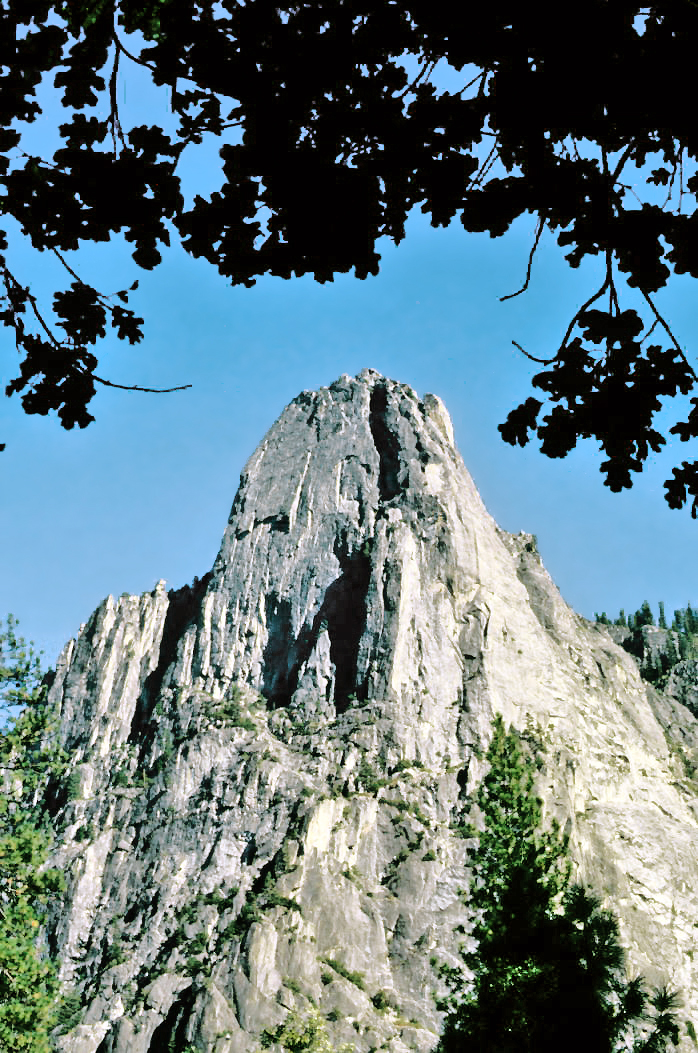
- Sentinel Rock is made of Sentinel granodiorite
- Type: Geological formation
- Unit of: Tuolumne Intrusive Suite

Location
- Location: California
- Coordinates: 37°43′43″N 119°35′45″W
- Country: United States

Type section
- Named for: Sentinel Rock

Sentinel granodiorite is a type of granodiorite found in Yosemite National Park. It is a poorly understood western "outlier" of the ~93-85-Ma Tuolumne Intrusive Suite of the Sierra Nevada batholith. It is only slightly older than the undated Yosemite Creek Granodiorite and the Kuna Crest Granodiorite.

== Its name ==
Sentinel granodiorite was named after Sentinel Rock in Yosemite National Park, California. The granodiorite forms part of the Tuolumne Intrusive Suite (Tuolumne Batholith), one of the four major intrusive suites within the Sierra Nevada.

== An overview, its composition ==
Sentinel granodiorite has a less uniform composition than other Yosemite granites and granodiorites. On the west end of Yosemite Valley, it is more homogeneous and light-colored, and on the east, it is more streaky, with an uneven composition. On the east, it is also much darker than on the west.

The chemical composition of Sentinel Granodiorite is less uniform than most of the other intrusive bodies. In the western part of the zone crossed by the Yosemite Valley Sentinel Granodiorite is homogeneous and lighter colored, though the eastern part it is more streaky with an uneven in composition; the texture and on the whole is considerably darker than the western part.

Sentinel Granodiorite is a light-gray and medium-grained biotite-hornblende granodiorite. The color index is normally about 15, and ranges from 10 to 25. The hornblende is tabular, of crystals which are usually 4 - 6 millimeters long, and helps to define a weak to moderately strong magmatic foliation and lineation. Hornblende makes up from about 3% to 10% of Sentinel Granodiorite. Biotite makes up about 7% to 15%, and the crystals are one to five millimeters long. It is in an aggregate with the hornblende. Plagioclase makes up about 50% of Sentinel Granodiorite, and in size, ranges from one to ten millimeters. Interstitial potassium feldspar makes up ten to thirty percent of Sentinel Granodiorite, is two to five millimeters across. Sphene is abundant, but rarely more than 1% of Sentinel Granodiorite; it is wedge-shapes, and usually about 0.1 to 1 millimeter long, but can reach 2 millimeters in length. Other accessory minerals are allanite, zircon, and apatite.

A soda-lime feldspar predominates over potash feldspar, and quartz is abundant. Hornblende and biotite are present in moderate, nearly equal amounts.

== Its relationship to Yosemite Creek Granodiorite ==
From Yosemite Creek Granodiorite, Sentinel Granodiorite varies only in texture: The plagioclase is white on its weathered surfaces, more euhedral, and the hornblende is smaller, less euhedral. There exists transitional Sentinel / Yosemite Creek Granodiorite.

== Where is it found ==
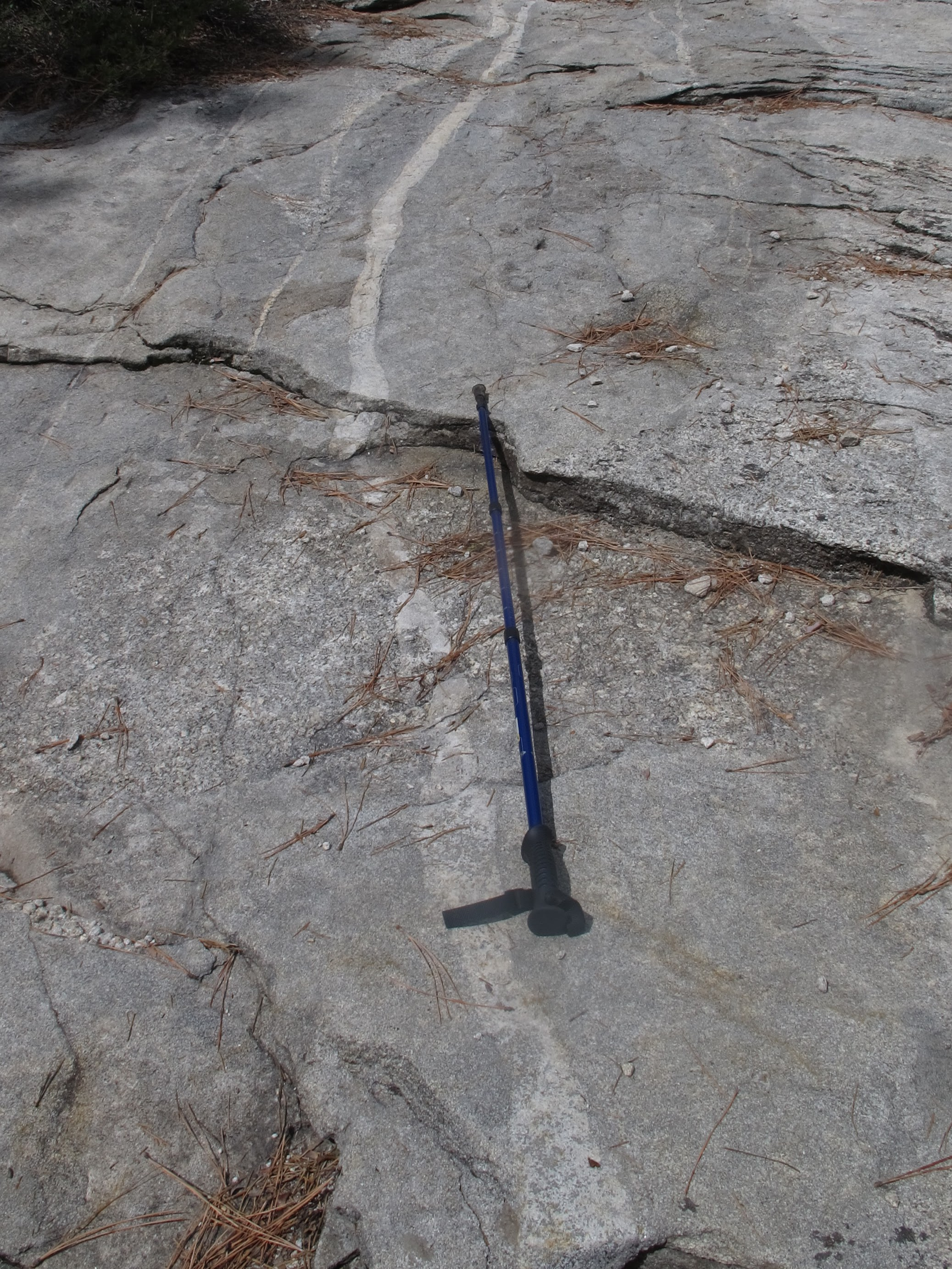
Sentinel granodiorite cut by an aplite dike

Sentinel Rock is composed entirely of Sentinel Granodiorite, gave it the name.

Sentinel Fall pours over Sentinel Granodiorite.

== Its age ==
It is oldest unit in Tuolumne intrusive series. It has been assigned an age in the Late Cretaceous period, perhaps 90 Ma, perhaps as old as 94 Ma, or 96 to 94 Ma.

== Where found ==
The rock forms part of a large irregular intrusive body, but the portion of it here considered is a belt about 2 miles broad that crosses the valley from north to south.

The walls of the Yosemite Valley consist mainly of a Sentinel granodiorite, a light-gray granitoid rock, from the Three Brothers to nearly as far east as the Royal Arches, and from the Fissures on the east, to Glacier Point.

== Rock climbing ==
In rock climbing, Sentinel Granodiorite is noted for its dihedrals, plus for having dikes. Dikes of aplite and pegmatite commonly intrude on Sentinel Granodiorite. Dikes vary in width from less than one centimeter of over one meter, are usually ten to fifteen centimeters wide. They often extend several hundred meters, and have irregularly-shaped or web-like systems that can extend several tens of square meters.

== See also ==
- Bridalveil Granodiorite
- Cathedral Peak Granodiorite
- El Capitan Granite
- Geology of the Yosemite area
- Granite of Rancheria Mountain
- Half Dome Granodiorite
- Johnson Granite Porphyry
- Kuna Crest Granodiorite
- Mount Hoffman Granite
- Tuolumne Intrusive Suite
- Taft Granite
- Yosemite Creek Granodiorite
- Yosemite Valley Intrusive Suite
