= Bingaman =

Bingaman is a surname, an altered spelling of the German surname Bingemann. Notable people with the surname include:

- Adam Bingaman (d. 1819), Mississippi planter and politician
- Adam Lewis Bingaman (1790–1869), Mississippi politician and race horse owner
- Jeff Bingaman (born 1943), senior U.S. Senator from the state of New Mexico
- Les Bingaman (1926–1970), NFL Pro Bowl defensive end and coach
- Ruth Bingaman (1894–1996), American pianist

== See also ==
- Bingaman Lake, a lake in California
