= Mammoth Peak =

Mountain in Yosemite National Park

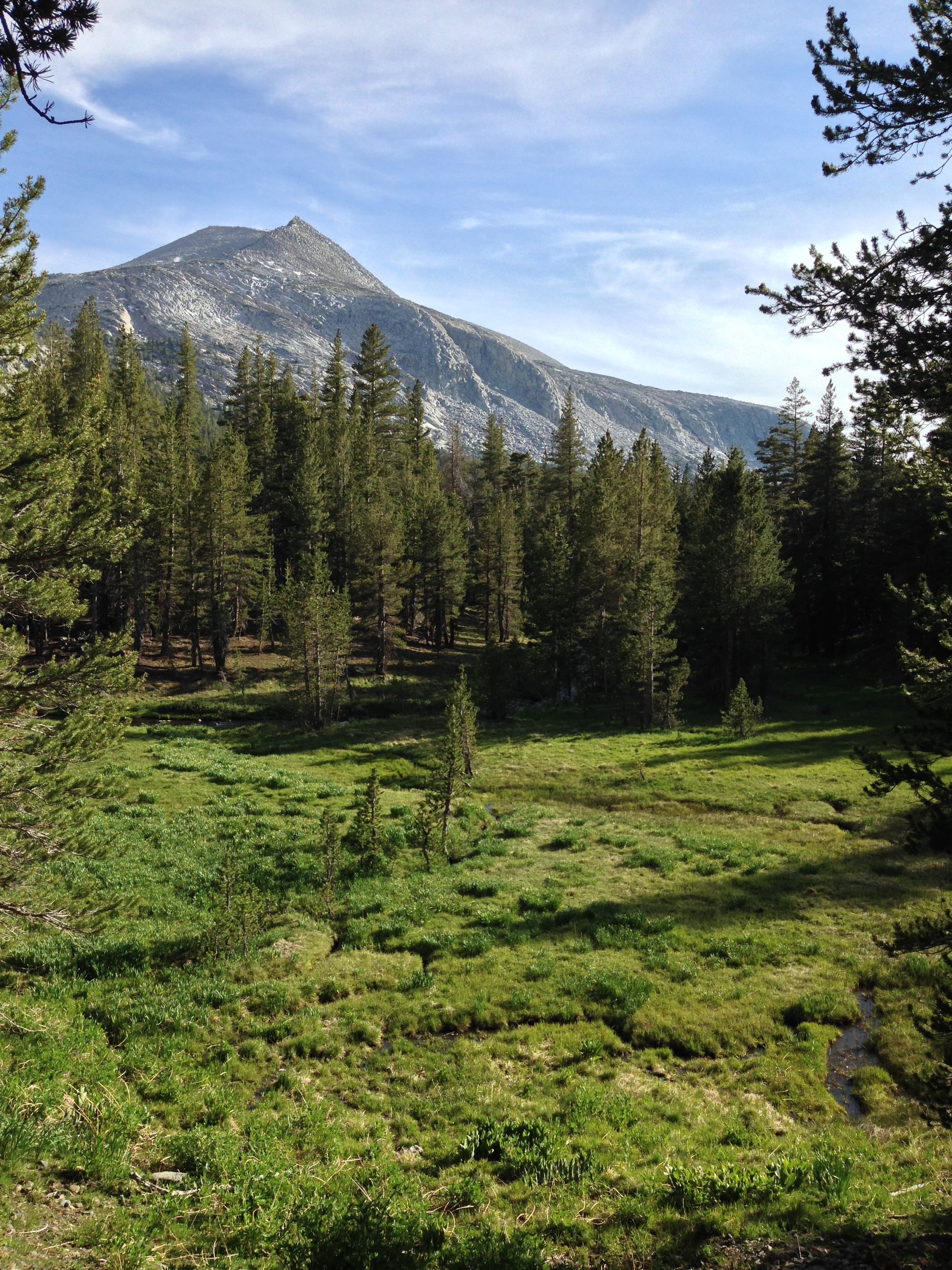
- Mammoth Peak, from the Mono Pass Trail, Yosemite National Park, Tuolumne County, California

Highest point
- Elevation: 12,112 ft (3,692 m) NAVD 88
- Prominence: 306 ft (93 m)
- Coordinates: 37°51′19″N 119°15′49″W NAVD 88

Geography
- Location: Tuolumne Meadows, Yosemite National Park, California, United States
- Parent range: Cathedral Range, Sierra Nevada

Geology
- Rock age: Late Cretaceous
- Mountain type: Granite

Climbing
- Easiest route: scramble, class 1-2

Mammoth Peak is a mountain in the area of Tuolumne Meadows, Yosemite National Park, California. The summit is a class 1-2 cross-country hike that features river crossings and boulder scrambling. The peak lies at the northern end of the Kuna Crest and is close to California State Route 120. From the road, its summit appears rounded and quite rocky. Though Mammoth Peak is not as popular as other nearby peaks, its relatively easily accessed summit affords tremendous views of Mount Gibbs, Mount Dana, and Mount Lewis.

== The proximity of Mammoth Peak ==
All of the following are at least close to Mammoth Peak:

- Cockscomb, a mountain
- Johnson Peak, a mountain
- Kuna Crest, a ridge, consisting of Kuna Crest South and Kuna Crest North
- Kuna Peak, a mountain
- Lembert Dome, a granite dome
- Mount Dana, a mountain
- Mount Gibbs, a mountain
- Mount Lewis, a mountain

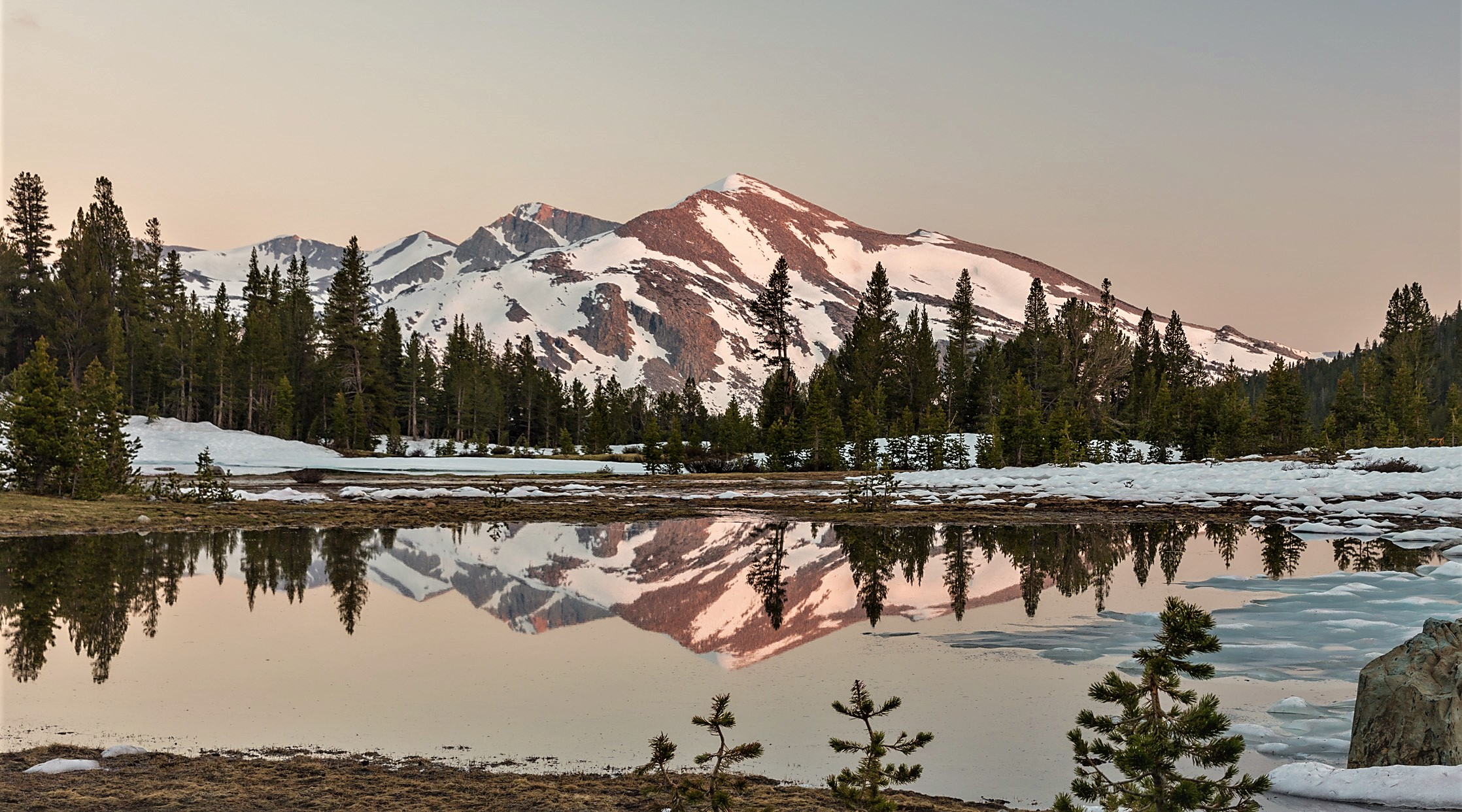
Evening falls on Mammoth Peak

== Geology of the Mammoth Peak area ==
Mammoth Peak is of a sheeted intrusive complex, formed in the interior of a 7 kilometres (4.3 mi) to 10 kilometres (6.2 mi) deep magma chamber, made of Half Dome granodiorite of the Tuolumne batholith. Tuolumne batholith (also, the Tuolumne Intrusive Suite) dates to Late Cretaceous (~95 to ~85) Ma.
