= Half Dome Granodiorite =

Granodiorite found in Yosemite National Park

- Stratigraphic range: early Late Cretaceous 85–83.4 Ma
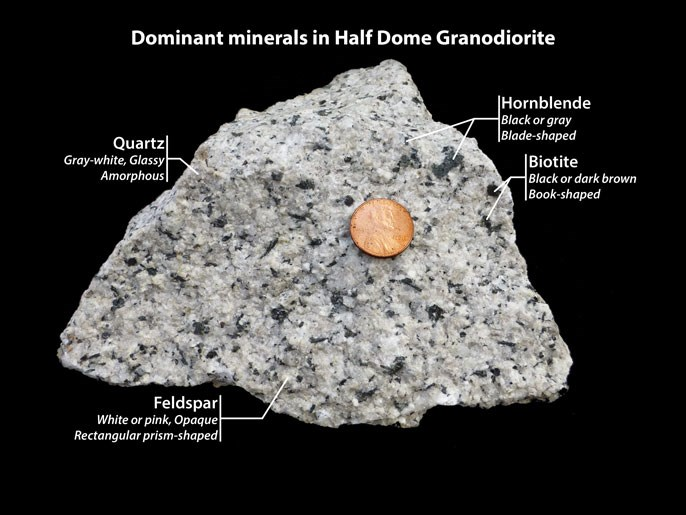
- Type: Geological formation

Lithology
- Primary: Granodiorite

Location
- Region: Yosemite National Park
- Country: United States

Type section
- Named for: Half Dome
- A geologic map of Yosemite National Park

Half Dome Granodiorite is granodiorite (see also granite) found in a region on and near Half Dome, in Yosemite National Park, California, United States. The granodiorite forms part of the Tuolumne Intrusive Suite (a.k.a. Tuolumne Batholith), one of the four major intrusive suites within the Sierra Nevada.

== Mineralogy ==
The granodiorite has large crystals of biotite, hornblende, and both feldspars — orthoclase and plagioclase. The space between crystals tends to be filled with quartz. The hornblende tends to have large, over 0.5 in (1.27 cm) rectangular crystals. The biotite forms hexagonal "blocks," up to 0.25 in (6.35 mm) across. A knife blade can peel the edges.

Sphene is found in Half Dome Granodiorite. The grains are honey-colored, and large at 0.25 in (6.35 mm) across. Uranium is also present.

From petrographic observation, the average mineral proportion of non-layered rocks of Half Dome Granodiorite is 45% plagioclase feldspar, 25% quartz, 8% biotite, 15% K-feldspar, 5% hornblende, 1% titanite, and 1% magnetite.

== Age ==
Half Dome Granodiorite traces to early Late Cretaceous. Its age is between 85 and 83.4 (+/-1 to 2%) Ma, with average age of 84.1 Ma. It is younger than Sentinel granodiorite (88.4 Ma), and older than Cathedral Peak granite (83.7 Ma). Half Dome Granodiorite is the Valley's youngest plutonic rock.

== Locations ==
Half Dome Granodiorite dominates Yosemite Valley area east of Royal Arches and Glacier Point. At Church Bowl and in the cliff west of Royal Arches, horizontal dikes of Half Dome Granodiorite cut the older granodiorite of Kuna Crest. Half Dome Granodiorite forms the sheer cliffs to the north of the trail between the Ahwahnee Hotel and Mirror Lake . The trail to Vernal and Nevada Falls also crosses through Half Dome Granodiorite.

== See also ==
- Cathedral Peak Granodiorite
- El Capitan Granite
- Geology of the Yosemite area
- Johnson Granite Porphyry
- Kuna Crest Granodiorite
- Sentinel granodiorite
- Tuolumne Intrusive Suite
