= Acker Peak =

Mountain in California, United States

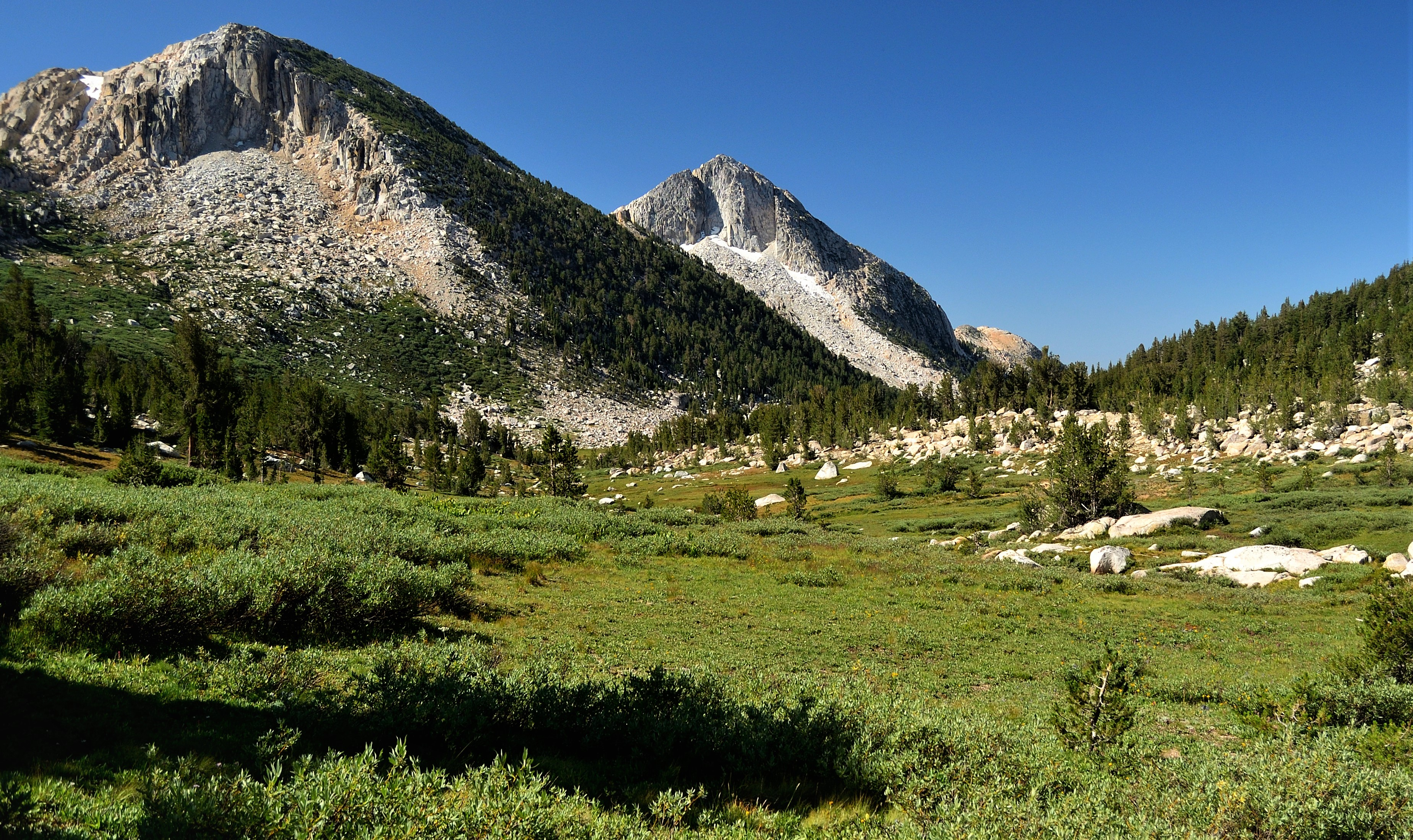
- North aspect, centered

Highest point
- Elevation: 10,988 ft (3,349 m)
- Prominence: 908 ft (277 m)
- Isolation: 1.34 mi (2.16 km)
- Coordinates: 38°06′32″N 119°30′35″W

Geography
- Location within California Location within the United States
- Location: Yosemite National Park; Tuolumne County; California, United States
- Parent range: Sierra Nevada
- Topo map: USGS Piute Mountain

Geology
- Rock age: Cretaceous
- Mountain type: Fault block
- Rock type: Granodiorite

Climbing
- First ascent: 1945
- Easiest route: class 2 East slope Southwest slope

Acker Peak is a summit in Yosemite National Park in Tuolumne County, California, United States. With an elevation of 10,988 feet (3,349 m), Acker Peak is the 665th-highest summit in the state of California.

The summit was named for William Bertrand Acker, a park official. This geographical feature's toponym was officially adopted in 1932 by the U.S. Board on Geographic Names.

The first ascent of the summit was made July 27, 1945, by Arthur J. Reyman.

== Climate ==
According to the Köppen climate classification system, Acker Peak is located in an alpine climate zone. Most weather fronts originate in the Pacific Ocean, and travel east toward the Sierra Nevada mountains. As fronts approach, they are forced upward by the peaks (orographic lift), causing them to drop their moisture in the form of rain or snowfall onto the range.

== See also ==
- Geology of the Yosemite area
