= Nevadan orogeny =

Mountain building event in North America

The Nevadan orogeny occurred along the western margin of North America during the Late Jurassic to Early Cretaceous approximately 155 Ma to 145 Ma. Throughout the duration of this orogeny there were at least two different kinds of orogenic processes occurring. During the early stages of orogenesis an "Andean type" continental magmatic arc developed due to subduction of the Farallon oceanic plate beneath the North American Plate. The latter stages of orogenesis, in contrast, saw multiple oceanic arc terranes accreted onto the western margin of North America in a "Cordilleran type" accretionary orogen. Deformation related to the accretion of these volcanic arc terranes is mostly limited to the western regions of the resulting mountain ranges (Klamath Mountain range and Sierra Nevada) and is absent from the eastern regions. In addition, the deformation experienced in these mountain ranges is mostly due to the Nevadan orogeny and not other external events such as the more recent Sevier and Laramide Orogenies. It is noted that the Klamath Mountains and the Sierra Nevada share similar stratigraphy indicating that they were both formed by the Nevadan orogeny. In comparison with other orogenic events, it appears that the Nevadan Orogeny occurred rather quickly taking only about 10 million years as compared to hundreds of millions of years for other orogenies around the world (ex. Trans-Hudson orogeny).

== Order of events ==
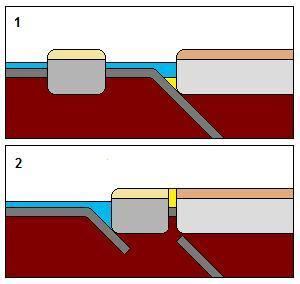
"Cordilleran" style of arc terrane accretion onto a continental land mass. Continued subduction transports the arc terrane to the margin of the continent where it is too buoyant to be subducted so it gets accreted to the continent.

The Nevadan Orogeny began with the formation of a continental volcanic arc due to east dipping subduction of the Farallon Plate beneath the North American Plate. Continued subduction of oceanic crust transported multiple oceanic arc terranes to the western margin of North America where they were accreted onto the edge of the continent. During the accretion of the arc terranes onto North America, the sediment and crustal material between North American and the incoming arc terrane were thrust onto the continent forming ophiolite sequences that are preserved in both the Klamath Mountains and the Sierra Nevada. These mountain ranges are located in northern California-southern Oregon, and central California respectively. The accretion of arc terranes resulted in the generation of three distinct belts in the Sierra Nevada: the Western belt, Central belt, and Eastern Belt. The Klamath Mountains are somewhat more complex in their overall structure than the Sierra Nevada.

== Sierra Nevada ==
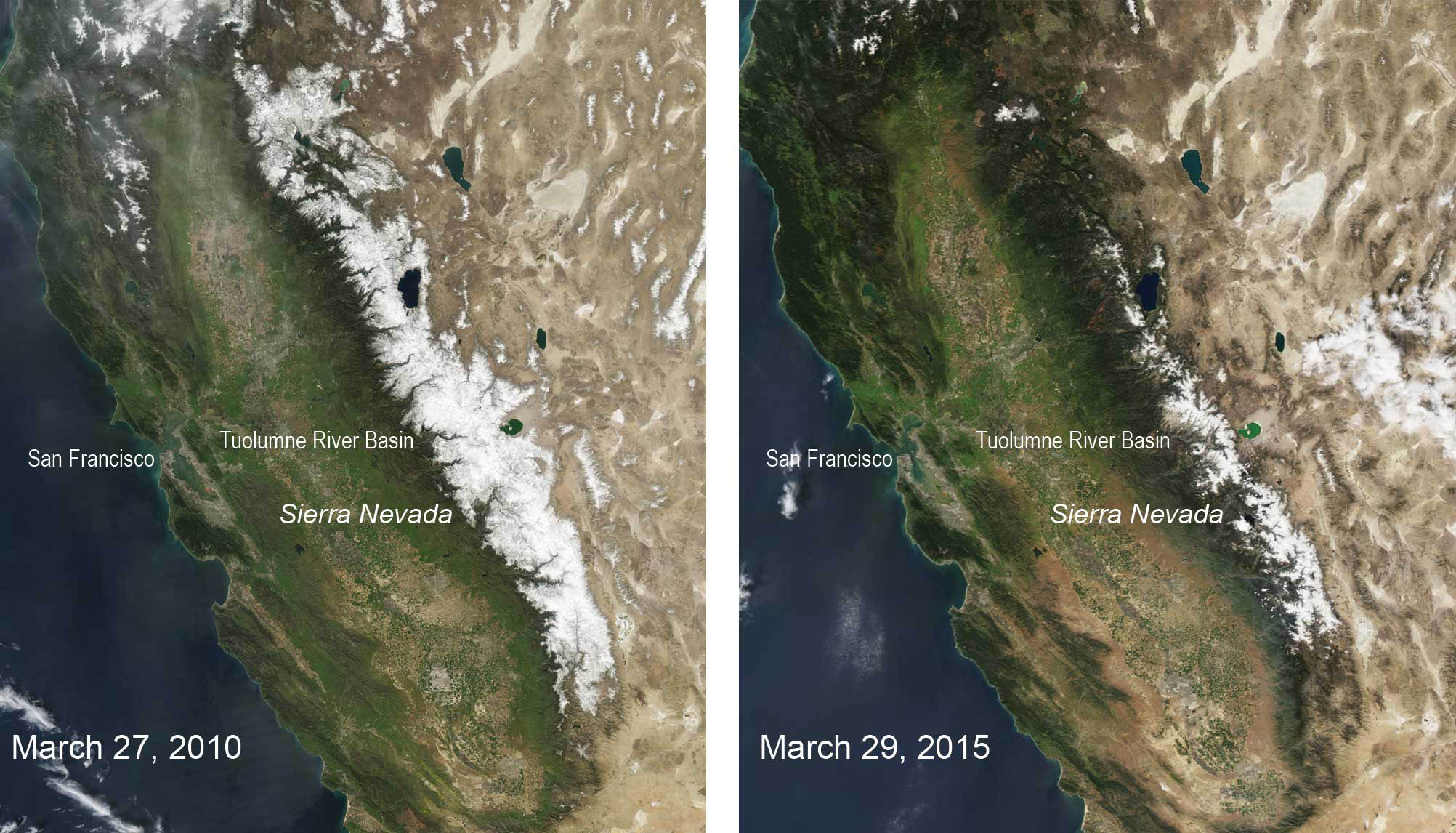
The Sierra Nevada, covered by snow in the left image.

=== Eastern belt ===
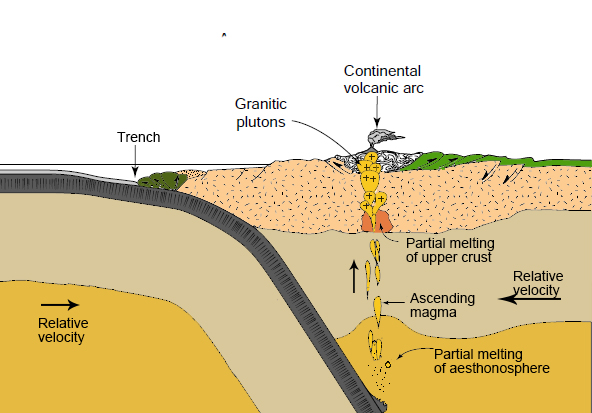
"Andean" style of orogenesis involving the subduction of an oceanic plate beneath a continental plate causing partial melt of the asthenosphere wedge atop the down going plate. The partial melt then rises and causes volcanism to start to build up mountains through lava flows and deposits from eruptions.

The eastern belt of the Sierra Nevada consists of the Northern Sierra Terrane. The Northern Sierra Terrane was formed from volcanism at the western edge of North America due to the subduction of an oceanic plate, which eventually resulted in the accretion of the Tuolumne River and Slate Creek terranes to North America. This is analogous to the "Andean" style of orogenesis where subduction of an oceanic plate to approximately 110 km (68 mi) beneath the surface of Earth results in melting of the down-going slab and convecting asthenosphere. This melting may be assisted by the presence of water in what is known as flux melting. The melt from the slab then rises up through the asthenosphere and through the crust to create large batholiths and volcanism.

Although deformation in the western and central regions of the Sierra Nevada is widespread, deformation from the Nevadan Orogeny in the Eastern Belt is somewhat limited. It was determined that the deformation was minimal in the Eastern Belt by looking at dikes that had intruded the rocks which appeared to be mostly undeformed. These mostly undeformed dikes were dated using the potassium-argon (K-Ar) method and were determined to be between 169 and 209 Ma in age, which implies they were placed well before any deformation related to the Nevadan Orogeny would have occurred. As the age of these dikes are older than the deformation of the Nevadan Orogeny, it is evident that most of the deformation took place towards the western side of the Sierra Nevada, rather than in the eastern regions.

=== Central belt ===
The Central belt of the Sierra Nevada consists of rocks from the Tuolumne River terrane which were accreted onto the western Margin of North America at an earlier time (>150 Ma) than the rocks of the Slate Creek terrane. In general there are two different zones in the Central belt, which are the Calaveras greenschist complex and the Shoo Fly complex.

The Calaveras-greenschist complex is located in the western half of the Central Belt and essentially consists of volcanic arc rocks along with small amounts of chert and argillite. The Shoo Fly complex is to the East of the Calaveras greenschist complex and is dominated by quartz sandstone with small amounts of limestone and phyllite.

K-Ar dating of the Tuolumne River terrane indicates it is between 190 and 170 Ma in age. During this time there would have been significant amounts of folding and thrust faulting near the collision zone for both the Tuolumne River terrane and the existing Northern Sierra Terrane. However, most of the deformation that would have been experienced in the collision was restricted to the Tuolumne River Terrane as minimal deformation is seen in the Eastern Belt.

=== Western belt ===
The rocks of the Western belt comprise dominantly sedimentary rocks including greywacke and mudstone that have undergone deformation. In the southern part of the Western Belt the rocks have undergone folding as the main type of deformation. The Western Belt is generally separated from the Central Belt by the Melones fault zone which also distinguishes between the metamorphic rocks of the Western and Central Belts of the Sierra Nevada.

The Western Belt rocks are interpreted to be a part of the Slate Creek terrane, which was accreted onto the western margin of North America at approximately 150 Ma. The age of these rocks was dated using K-Ar dating.

At the western foothills of the Sierra Nevada there are numerous dikes that have intruded the rocks that range in age from 148 to 155 Ma. These dikes are proposed to have been formed when the North American plate underwent a change in motion direction so that subduction was no longer occurring in a northeast direction but in the southeast direction. The shear sense along the dikes is a sinistral shear sense which indicates later southeast subduction of the oceanic plate.

== Klamath Mountains ==
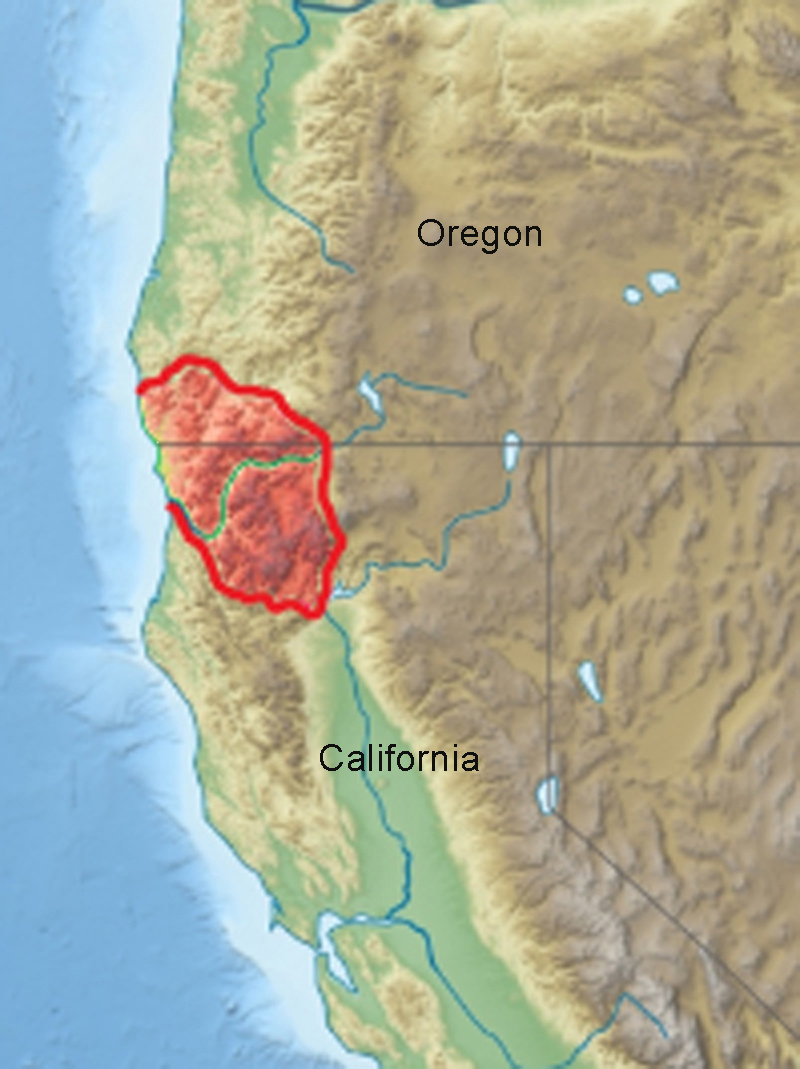
The Klamath Mountains highlighted in red. The Sierra Nevada (not highlighted) runs along the east margin of the Great Valley in California.

The Klamath Mountains tell a similar story to the Sierra Nevada in that they are the product of multiple different accretionary events of island arc terranes. The current proposed model for the formation of the Klamath mountains involves multiple stages. The first stage of the formation of the Klamath mountains was arc magmatism on the western coast of North America which resulted in the formation of the Western Hayfork Terrane. Once the Western Hayfork Terrane was formed (and had subsequently stopped forming) the region was intruded by mafic dikes attributed to some form of extension at approximately 160 Ma. Once extension ceased in the area, compression began again, resulting in the closure of a very small back arc basin produced by the extension and accreted the ophiolite sequences seen in the Klamath Mountains from the Nevadan Orogeny time (Josephine Ophiolite at 155 Ma). Continued convergence in the Klamath Mountains region would eventually lead to the emplacement of dikes and sills within the Josephine Ophiolite at approximately 153 Ma. The youngest of the accretionary ophiolite sequence in the Klamath Mountains appears to be the Josephine Ophoilite, which is dated to be about 155 to 150 Ma in age using both argon-argon (Ar-Ar) and lead-uranium (Pb-U) methods. Rather than being thrust on top of North America, the Josephine Ophiolite was accreted through a different process that involved being thrust underneath North America and then eventually being exhumed at the surface. In the Klamath Mountains it has also been observed that there are two other plutons of rock that were accreted during the Nevadan Orogeny, the Abrams and Salmon mica schists of the Stuart Fork Formation. Using the K-Ar method of isotopic dating on phyllite, the age of metamorphism in the Stuart Fork Formation was determined to be about 148 Ma. The metamorphism related to the phyllite in the Stuart Fork Formation is from the older Abrams and Salmon mica schists being thrust on top of the Stuart Fork rocks during the end of the Nevadan Orogeny.

== Timing of events in the Sierra Nevada and Klamath Mountains ==
The Sierra Nevada and the Klamath Mountains were the result of continental magmatic arc and then oceanic arc accretion during the Nevadan Orogeny between 155 and 145 Ma. At nearly the same time the Eastern Belt of the Sierra Nevada was forming, the Western Hayfork Terrane of the Klamath Mountains was being constructed. As the Nevadan Orogeny progressed, the Tuolumne River Terrane was accreted to the Sierra Nevada at approximately the same time as the formation of the Josephine Ophiolite in the Klamath Mountains (150-155 Ma). During the last stages of orogenesis, the sedimentary rocks of the Western Belt were accreted to the Sierra Nevada while the Abrams and Salmon mica schists were thrust on top of the Stuart Fork Formation in the Klamath Mountains.
