= Kuna Crest =

Mountain range near Tuolumne Meadows, in Yosemite National Park, California

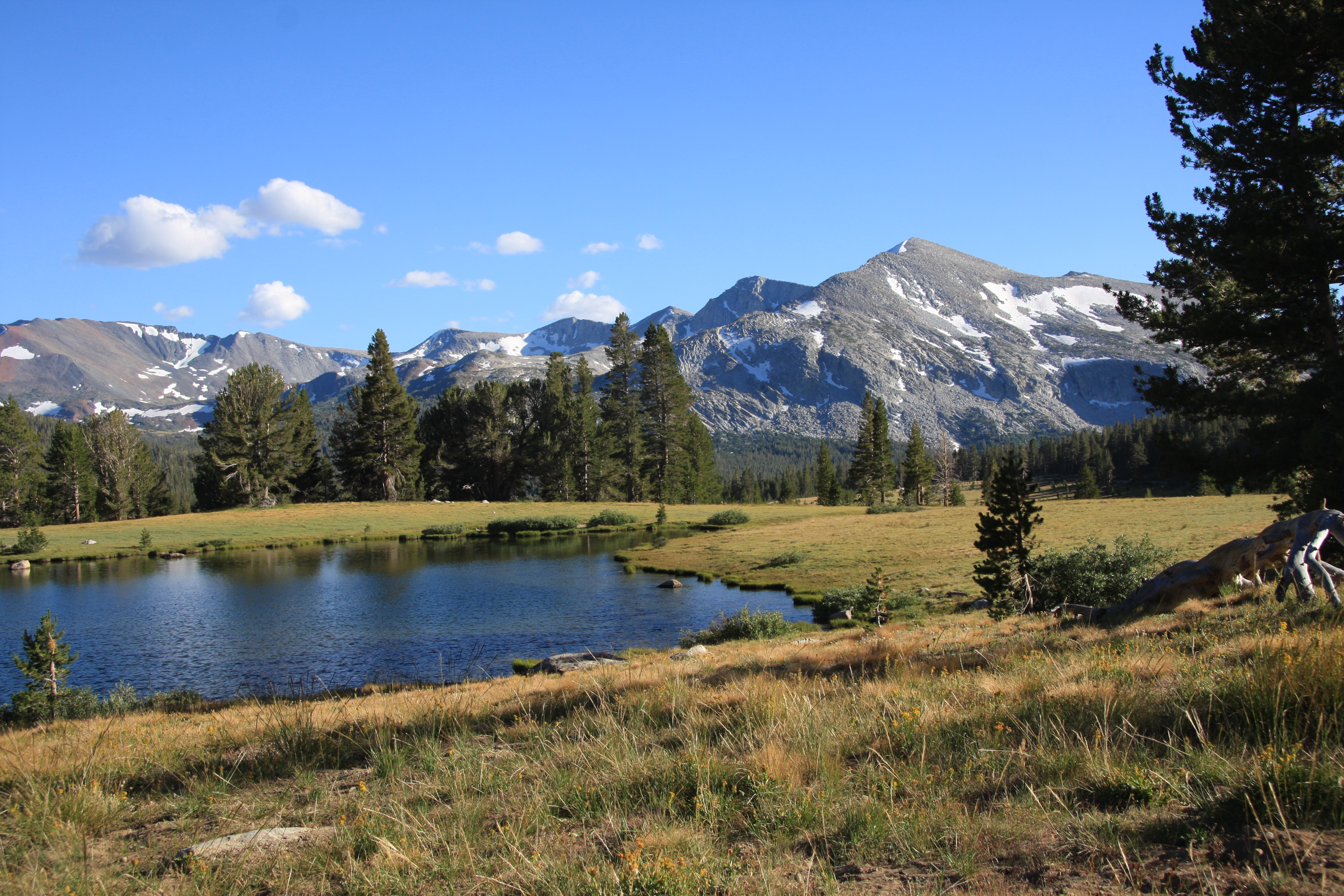
- Tioga Pass meadow, lake, Kuna Crest

Highest point
- Elevation: 12,170 ft (3,710 m) NAVD 88
- Prominence: 919 ft (280 m)
- Coordinates: 37.844°N 119.257°W

Geography
- Location: Yosemite National Park, California, U.S.
- Parent range: Ritter Range, Sierra Nevada

Geology
- Rock age: Cretaceous
- Mountain type: Kuna Crest Granodiorite

Climbing
- Easiest route: Hike

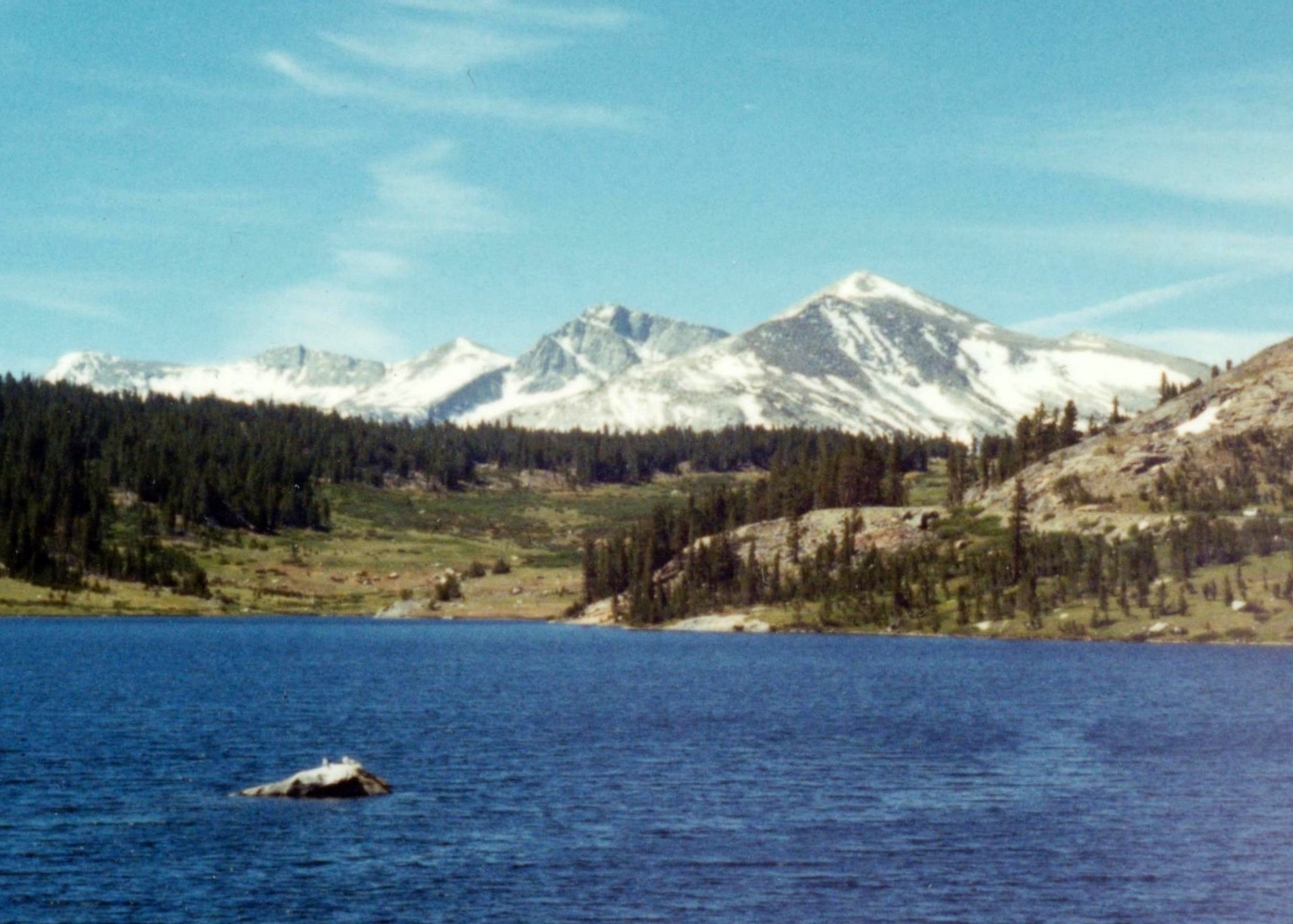
Kuna Crest, and Mammoth Peak

Kuna Crest is a mountain range near Tuolumne Meadows, in Yosemite National Park, California.

== Name ==
The word Kuna probably derives from a Shoshonean word meaning "fire," which appears in the Mono dialect of the area, with a meaning of firewood. On the summit of near-by Kuna Peak, there are many jagged pieces of rock which resemble fire themselves; see Kuna Crest Granodiorite.

== Geography and geology ==
The Crest lies between two U-shaped glacial valleys: Lyell Canyon and the canyon of the Parker Pass Creek. Mammoth Peak lies at the northern end of the Kuna Crest. A number of lakes lie in cirques cut into the eastern edge of the Crest, including Kuna Lake, Bingaman Lake, Spillway Lake, and Helen Lake.

The Crest consists of Kuna Crest Granodiorite, which is the oldest granitic rock of the Tuolumne Intrusive Suite. It is rich in biotite and hornblende.

== Rock climbing ==
Climbing on Kuna Crest consists of mostly of walking and scrambling; there isn't much rock climbing, on Kuna Crest proper. There is a traverse, between Mammoth Peak and Kuna Peak.
