= El Capitan Granite =

Type of granite found in Yosemite National Park

- Stratigraphic range: 103 Ma
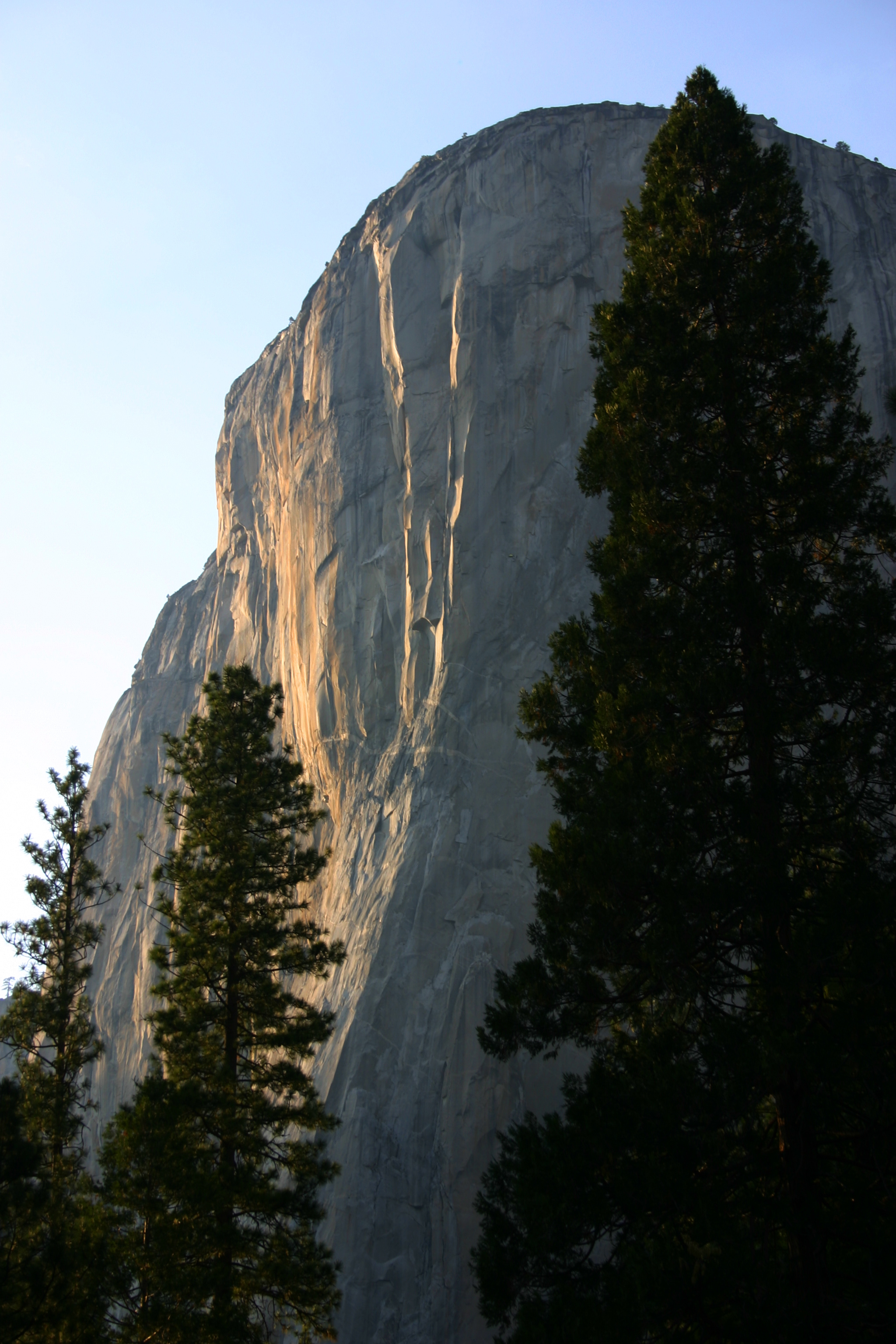
- El Capitan
- Type: Geological formation
- Unit of: Tuolumne Intrusive Suite

Location
- Location: California
- Country: United States

Type section
- Named for: El Capitan

A geologic map of Yosemite National Park

El Capitan Granite is a type of granite (also see granodiorite), in a large area near El Capitan, in Yosemite National Park, California, United States. The granite forms part of the Tuolumne Intrusive Suite (also known as Tuolumne Batholith), one of the four major intrusive suites within the Sierra Nevada.

El Capitan granite is mostly unjointed.

== Composition ==
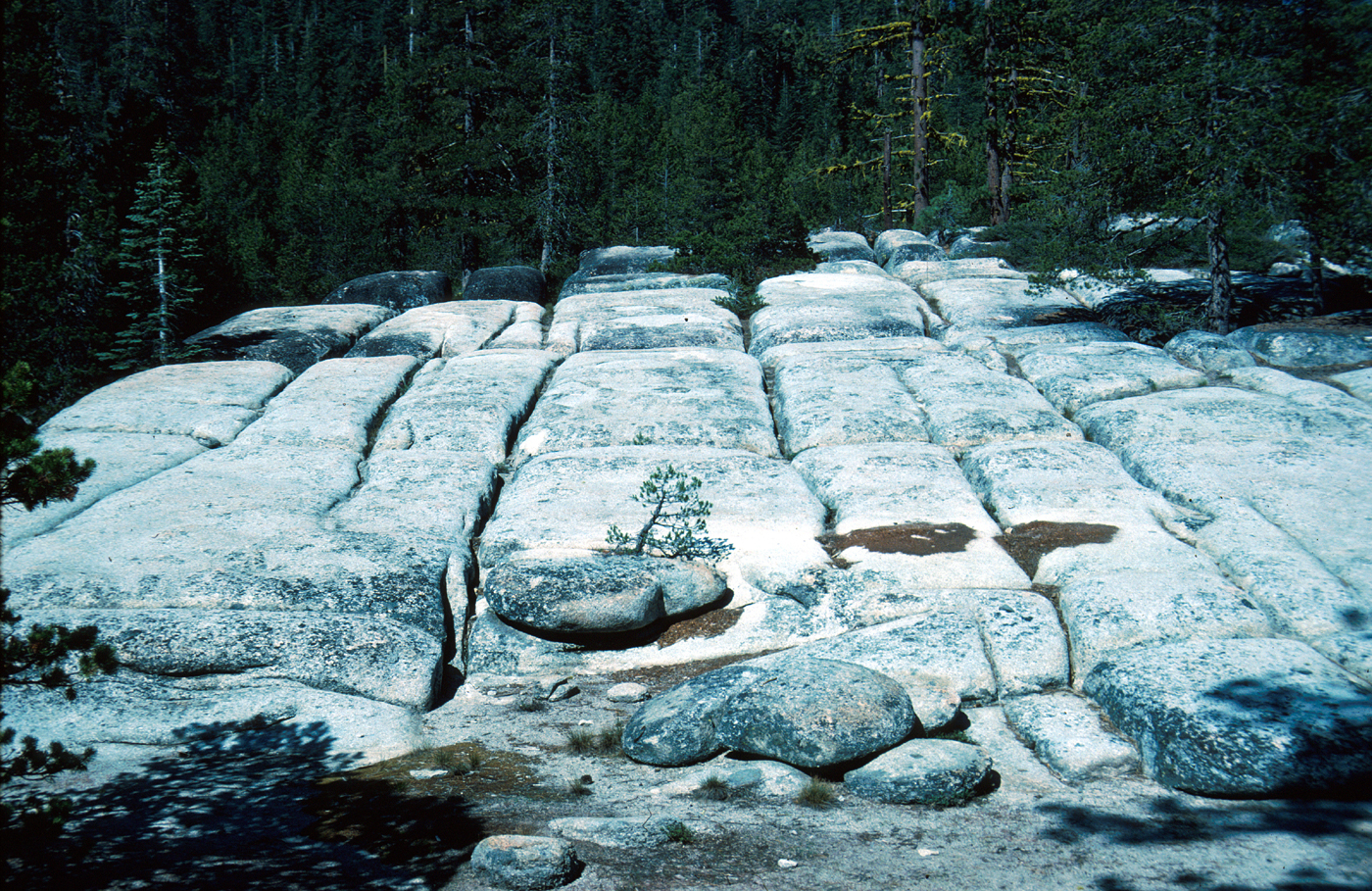
El Capitan Granite

The granite has abundant quartz, plagioclase, crystals of orthoclase, and both feldspars — orthoclase and plagioclase — are white. Hornblende is rare, compared to other Yosemite granites. Most black minerals are biotite.

== Location ==
It is found west of Half Dome Granodiorite, both north and south, to a western limit near Cookie Cliffs.

All of Turtleback Dome, El Capitan, The Three Brothers, and Cathedral Rocks are made of El Capitan Granite as is Elephant Rock.

El Capitan Granite makes up most of the granite found in the west half of the Yosemite Valley area.

== Age ==
El Capitan Granite intruded older plutonic rocks about 103 Ma, during the Cretaceous Period.

== See also ==
- Cathedral Peak Granodiorite
- Geology of the Yosemite area
- Half Dome Granodiorite
- Johnson Granite Porphyry
- Kuna Crest Granodiorite
- Sentinel granodiorite
- Tuolumne Intrusive Suite
- Yosemite Valley Intrusive Suite
