= Ruth Bingaman =

American musician

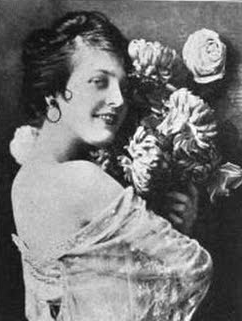
- Ruth Bingaman, from a 1922 publication
- Born: Ruth Lucille Bingaman; August 29, 1894; Columbus, Ohio, U.S.
- Died: May 15, 1996 (age 101); San Antonio, Texas, U.S.
- Other names: Ruth Bingaman Herman, Ruth Bingaman Smith
- Occupation(s): Pianist, composer, writer

Ruth Bingaman Herman Smith (August 29, 1894 – May 15, 1996) was an American classical pianist from Texas. She made piano roll recordings in the 1920s, and continued performing into her nineties.

== Early life and education ==
Bingaman was born in Columbus, Ohio, and raised in San Antonio, Texas, the daughter of William Lee Bingaman and Anna L. Bingaman. Her father was a musician and composer. She began studying piano with Carl Hahn of the San Antonio Symphony. She also studied with composer John Steinfeldt, and with pianists Ernest Hutcheson and Alberto Jonas in New York. In 1913, she graduated from San Antonio High School. After her first marriage, she pursued further studies at Yale School of Music.

== Career ==
Bingaman was just ten years old in 1905, when she performed Beethoven's C Major Concerto at Beethoven Hall in San Antonio. She gave her debut formal recital in 1911, and debuted with the San Antonio Symphony in 1915. In 1921 she gave a recital at Carnegie Hall. She toured with singers Dreda Aves and Rafaelo Díaz.

Bingaman made piano roll recordings for the Welte-Mignon Corporation in the 1920s and 1930s. She gave radio concerts from the 1920s. She was the lobby pianist at the Brooklyn-Paramount Theatre from 1928 to 1930. She was a soloist with the Knoxville Symphony Orchestra in 1939. In 1945 she gave a "victory concert" at the USO in Hattiesburg, Mississippi. She gave a joint recital with violinist Helen DeWitt at the Waldorf-Astoria Hotel in 1950. She gave her last public performance in February 1991.

She also composed music and wrote poetry. In 1967, music by Bingaman was included in a concert featuring the works of three San Antonio women composers. She won a Texas Composers League Award for her composition "Poem Heroique" for cello and piano. She was inducted into the Automatic Musical Instrument Collectors' Association (AMICA) Honor Roll. In 1973, 1977, and 1980, she played at AMICA conventions.

== Personal life ==
Bingaman married Army officer Harrison Herman in 1919. He died in World War II. She married Harrison Smith in 1948. They divorced and she returned to San Antonio in 1957. Smith died there in 1996, at the age of 101. Her grave is in Arlington National Cemetery.
