= Primocryst =

A primocryst is a reference to the earliest-formed crystals, in contact with each other in a magma. These may also be referred to as cumulus crystals.
