= Bingaman Lake =

- Location within California
- Location: Tuolumne County, California
- Coordinates: 37°50′45″N 119°14′46″W
- Type: lake

Bingaman Lake is a lake in Tuolumne County, California, in the United States.

Bingaman Lake was named for John W. Bingaman, a park ranger who stocked the lake with fish in exchange for the naming rights. The lake is below Kuna Crest and Kuna Peak.

== See also ==
- List of lakes in California
