= Shoo Fly Complex =

Subduction complex of rock

Coordinates: 38.9786°N 120.6128°W

The Shoo Fly Complex in the northern Sierra Nevada in California (USA) is a subduction complex of rock metamorphosed to lower greenschist facies. The name comes from an 1892 description by Joseph S. Diller of a prominent part of the formation between Shoo Fly Bridge (near Indian Falls) and Spanish Creek.
