= Mount Gibbs =

Mountain in California, United States

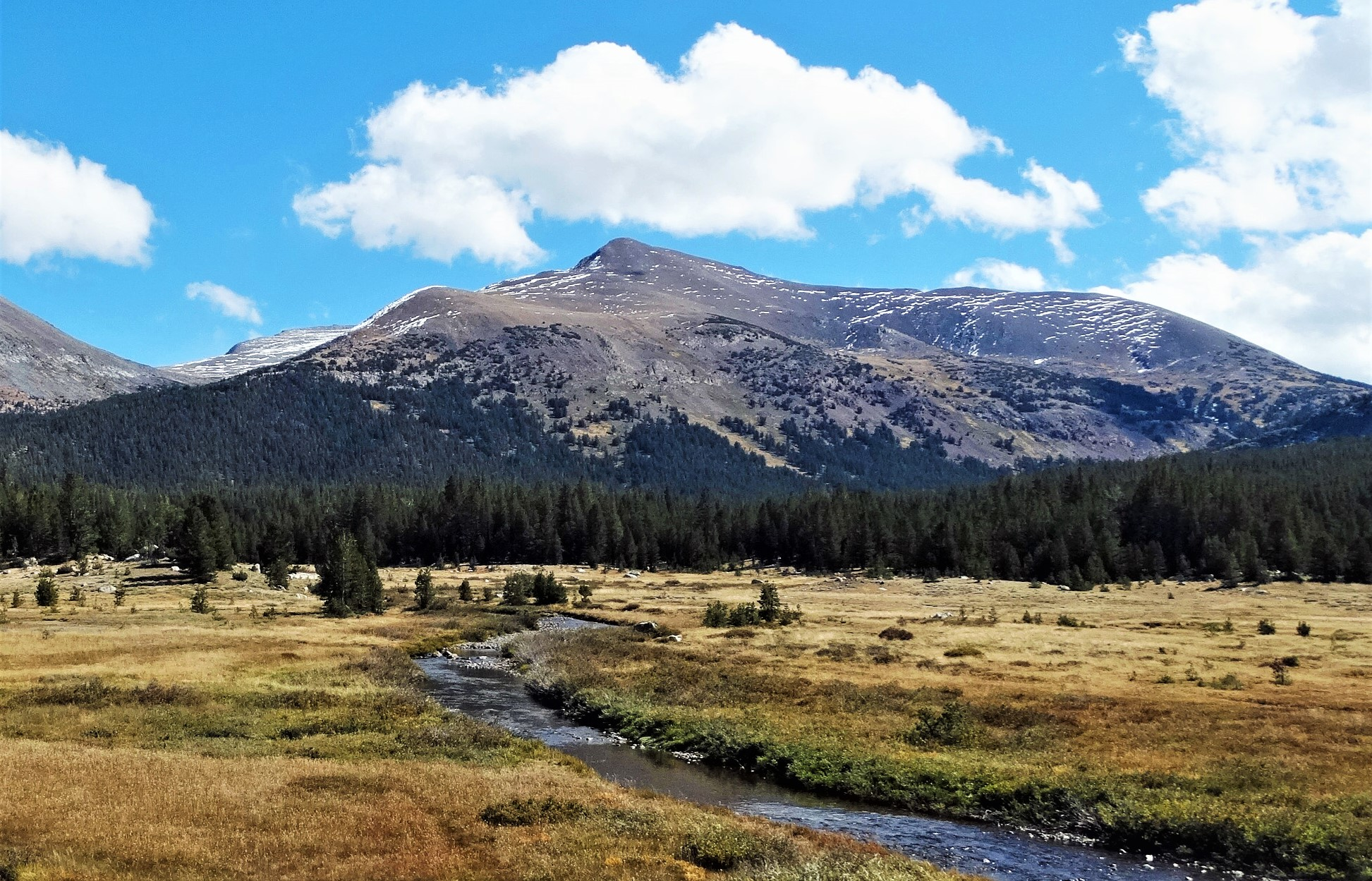
- West aspect, from Tuolumne Meadows

Highest point
- Elevation: 12,779 ft (3,895 m) NAVD 88
- Prominence: 1,093 ft (333 m)
- Parent peak: Mount Dana
- Listing: Sierra Peaks Section; Western States Climbers Emblem peak
- Coordinates: 37°52′38″N 119°12′43″W

Geography
- Location within California Location within the United States
- Location: Mono and Tuolumne counties, California, U.S.
- Parent range: Sierra Nevada
- Topo map: USGS Mount Dana

Geology
- Rock age: Cretaceous
- Mountain type: Metamorphic rock

Climbing
- First ascent: 1864 by Frederick Law Olmsted and William Henry Brewer on horseback
- Easiest route: Cross-country hike, class 1

Mount Gibbs is located in the Sierra Nevada of the U.S. state of California, 2.6 miles (4 km) south of Mount Dana. The mountain was named in honor of Oliver Gibbs, a professor at Harvard University and friend of Josiah Whitney. The summit marks the boundary between Yosemite National Park and the Ansel Adams Wilderness, and Mount Gibbs is the sixth-highest mountain, of Yosemite.

The peak is accessible either from the west, starting at Tioga Pass Road, or from the east, via Bloody Canyon from the trailhead at Walker Lake. Overnight camping is not permitted on the western side of the mountain, which is part of the protected watershed of Dana Meadows and Tioga Pass. In the summer the mountain has only patchy snow, on the northern slope. The easiest ascent is via the ridge extending west from the peak; there is a steep section of loose, unstable rock, leading to the gentle ridge that forms the top of the mountain. Although the top is above the tree line, there is some sparse plant life, including wildflowers. The view of Mono Lake from the summit is partially obstructed by an outcropping to the northeast.

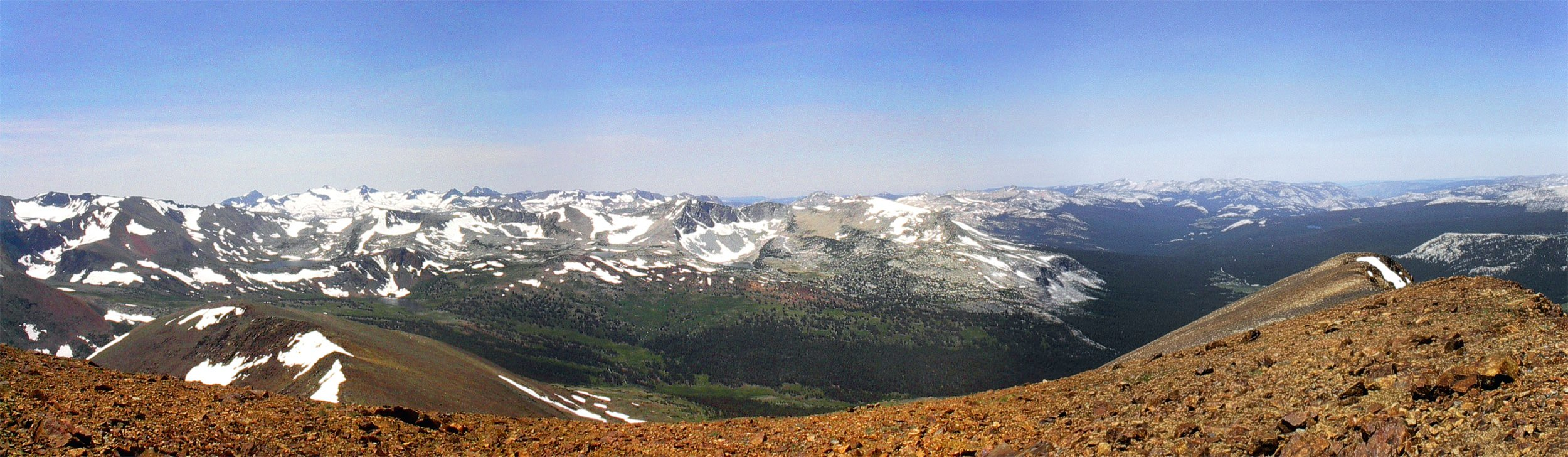
A partial panorama from the summit of Mt. Gibbs. The western ridge of Mount Gibbs is in the foreground at the ridge edge of the photo.
