= Aplite =

Fine-grained intrusive igneous rock type similar to granite

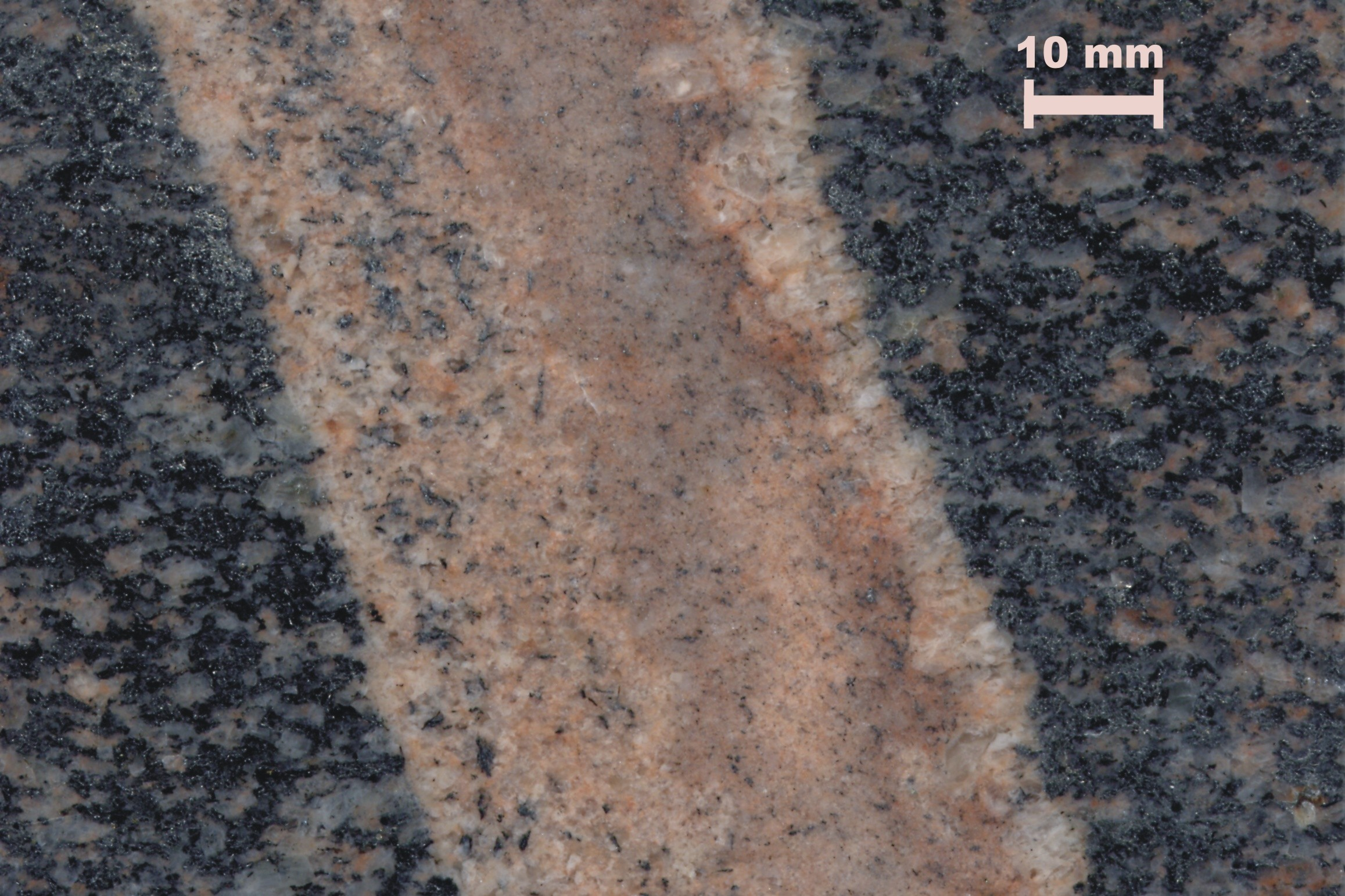
- Aplite (fine-grained center)

Composition
- Quartz, feldspar

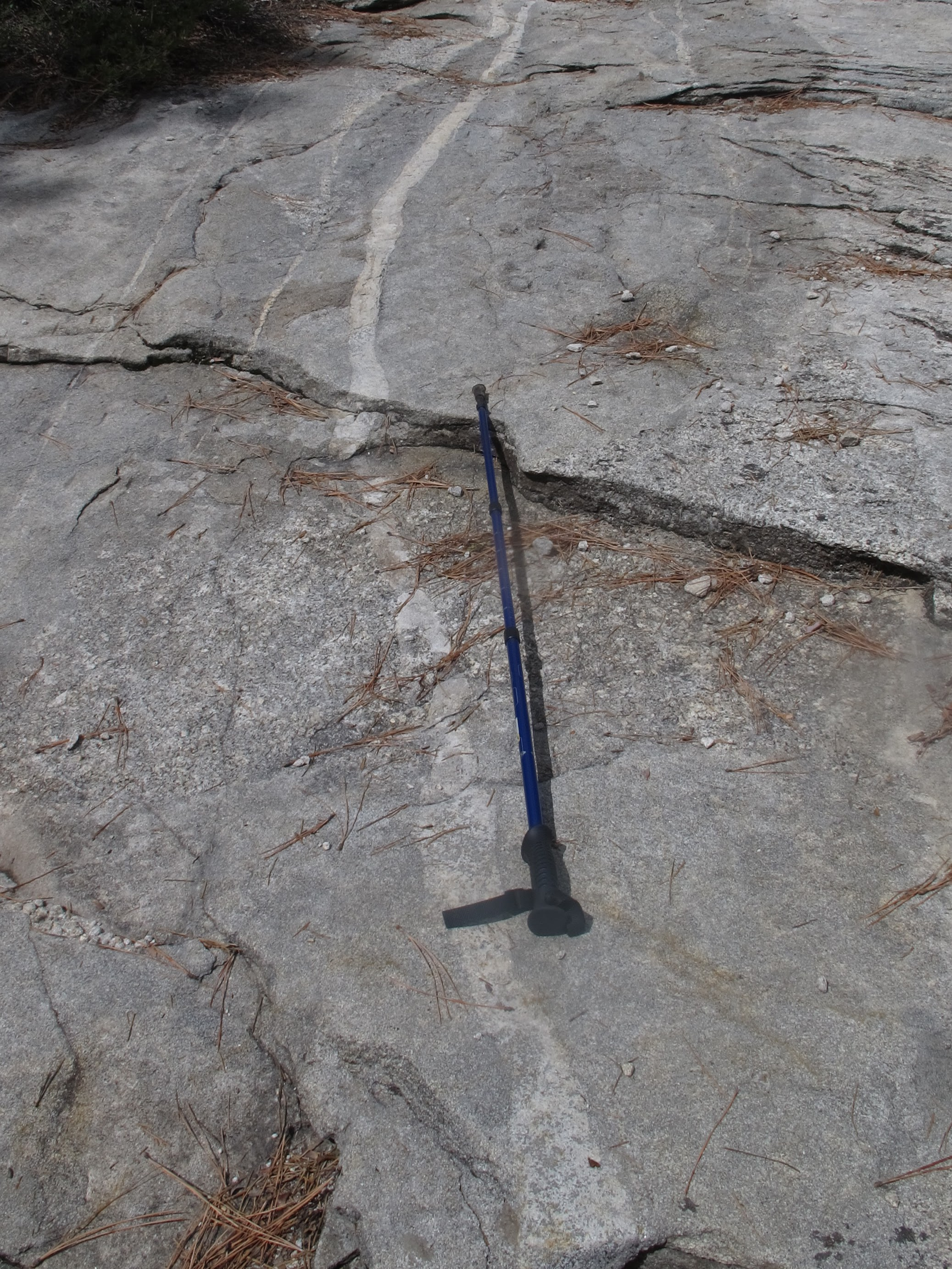
Aplite dyke cutting Sentinel granodiorite on Sentinel Dome

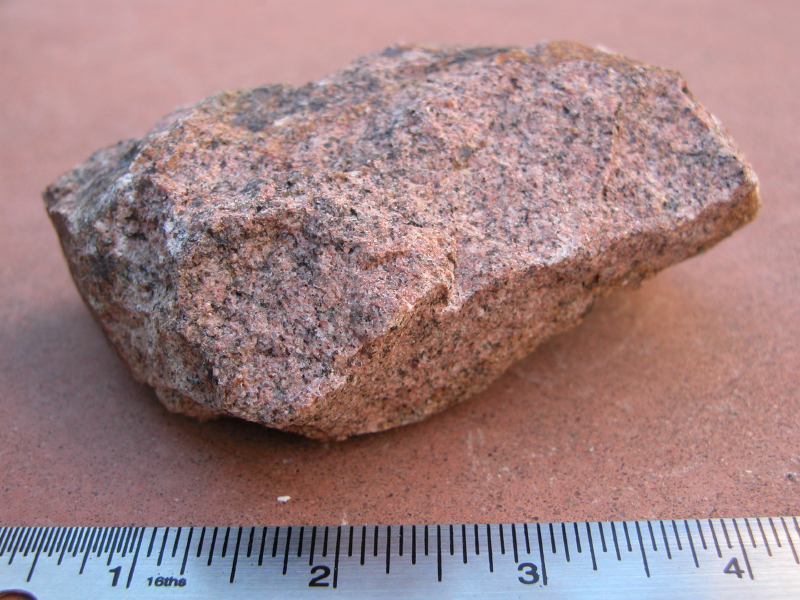
Aplite, showing fine-grained texture

Aplite (/ˈæplaɪt/) is an intrusive igneous rock that has a granitic composition. Aplites are fine-grained (very small individual mineral crystals) to aphanitic (without grains visible to the naked eye) and may consist of only quartz and feldspar or the term may refer to any leucocratic (pale-coloured) minor intrusion of that grain size. They are associated with the later stages of many larger intermediate to felsic intrusions.

== Occurrence ==
Aplites have a global distribution and have been described from most areas where there are significant granitic intrusions. They occur in the form of intrusive sheets, both within the associated granitic bodies and in the surrounding country rock. Trace element analysis shows that there are no volcanic equivalents to aplites.

Some aplites form in close association with pegmatites, which are otherwise uncommon in granites. These aplite-pegmatite sheet complexes may show fine-scale banding with alternations of aplite and pegmatite.

Syenite-aplites consist mainly of alkali feldspar; the diorite-aplites of plagioclase; there are nepheline-bearing aplites, including those containing the elaeolite variety of nepheline. In all cases, they bear the same relation to the parent masses.

== Formation ==
Aplites are intruded at a late stage in the history of the associated intrusion when crystallisation is at an advanced stage. In this state, the parent intrusion is mechanically coherent enough to support tensile stresses, leading to fractures. These fractures may then be filled by the remaining uncrystallised parts of the original magma (the residual fluids) to form the aplites. There may be repeated phases of intrusion, solidification, fracturing and aplite dyke intrusion. This has been observed in the Half Dome granodiorite in Yosemite National Park, California, with multiple stages of aplite intrusion recognised, with the earlier aplite sheets becoming deformed by later intrusions into the main granodiorite body, but recognisable from their consistent chemistry.
