= Magmatic foliation =

Foliation in granitoids

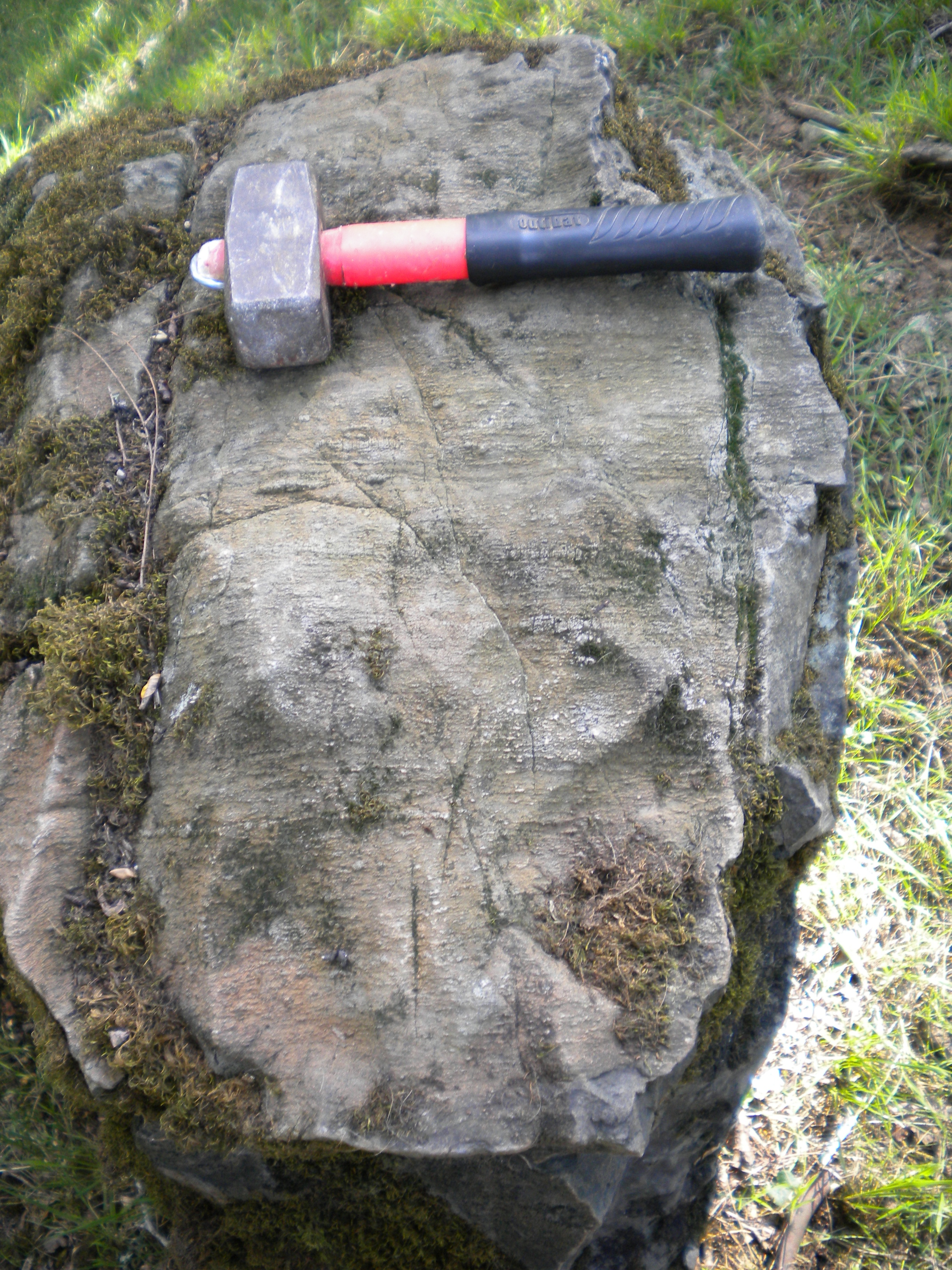
Metaharzburgite from the Rebière Massif, Saint-Martin-de-Fressengeas, Dordogne, France. The nearly upright magmatic (slightly South dipping) flow foliation parallels the hammer shaft.

Magmatic foliation is a term in geology, for foliation in granitoids that form by magmatic flow, "submagmatic flow," by high-temperature solid-state deformation and moderate- to low-temperature solid-state deformation.

Granitoids are igneous rocks.

== See also ==
- Foliation (geology)
