= Potassium feldspar =

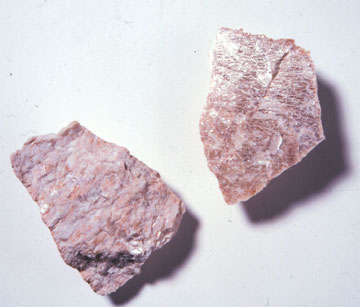

Potassium feldspar refers to a number of minerals in the feldspar group that contain large amounts of potassium in the crystal lattice.

- Orthoclase (endmember formula KAlSi_{3}O_{8}), an important tectosilicate mineral that forms igneous rock
- Microcline, chemically the same as orthoclase, but with a different crystalline structure
- Sanidine, the high-temperature form of potassium feldspar (K,Na)(Si,Al)_{4}O_{8}
- Adularia, a more ordered low-temperature variety of orthoclase or partially disordered microcline
- Amazonite (sometimes called "Amazon stone"), a green variety of microcline
