= Titanite =

Nesosilicate mineral

Titanite (Sphene)
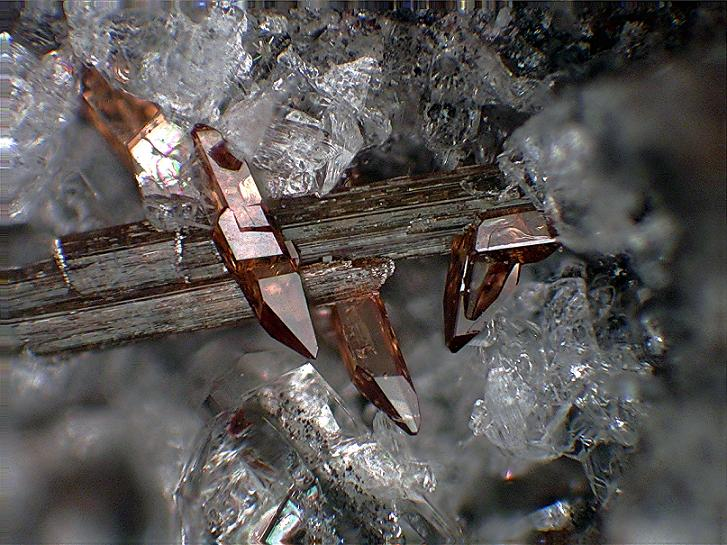
- Titanite crystals on amphibole (image width 2 mm)

General
- Category: Nesosilicate
- Formula: CaTiSiO_{5}
- IMA symbol: Ttn
- Strunz classification: 9.AG.15
- Crystal system: Monoclinic
- Crystal class: Prismatic (2/m) (same H–M symbol)
- Space group: P2_{1}/a
- Unit cell: a = 7.057 Å, b = 8.707 Å c = 6.555 Å; β = 113.81°; Z = 4

Identification
- Colour: Reddish brown, brown, gray, black, yellow, green, or red, colourless
- Crystal habit: Flattened wedge-shaped crystals, also massive
- Twinning: Contact and penetration on {100}, lamellar on {221}
- Cleavage: Distinct on [110], parting on {221}
- Fracture: Sub-conchoidal
- Mohs scale hardness: 5–5.5
- Luster: Sub-adamantine tending to slightly resinous
- Streak: Reddish white
- Diaphaneity: Translucent to transparent
- Specific gravity: 3.48–3.60
- Optical properties: Biaxial (+); very high relief
- Refractive index: nα = 1.843–1.950 nβ = 1.870–2.034 nγ = 1.943–2.110
- Birefringence: δ = 0.100–0.160
- Pleochroism: Strong: X = nearly colorless; Y = yellow to green; Z = red to yellow-orange
- 2V angle: 17–40° (measured)
- Dispersion: r > v strong
- Other characteristics: Radioactive – may be metamict

Titanite crystal model

Titanite, or sphene (from Ancient Greek σφηνώ (sphēnṓ) 'wedge'), is a calcium titanium nesosilicate mineral, CaTiSiO_{5}. Trace impurities of iron and aluminium are typically present. Also commonly present are rare earth metals including cerium and yttrium; calcium may be partly replaced by thorium.

== Nomenclature ==
The International Mineralogical Association Commission on New Minerals and Mineral Names (CNMMN) adopted the name titanite and "discredited" the name sphene as of 1982, although commonly papers and books initially identify the mineral using both names. Sphene was the most commonly used name until the IMA decision, although both were well known. Some authorities think it is less confusing as the word is used to describe any chemical or crystal with oxidized titanium such as the rare earth titanate pyrochlores series and many of the minerals with the perovskite structure. The name sphene continues to be publishable in peer-reviewed scientific literature, e.g. a paper by Hayden et al. was published in early 2008 in the journal Contributions to Mineralogy and Petrology. Sphene persists as the informal name for titanite gemstones.

== Physical properties ==
Titanite, which is named for its titanium content, occurs as translucent to transparent, reddish brown, gray, yellow, green, or red monoclinic crystals. These crystals are typically sphenoid in habit and are often twinned. Possessing a subadamantine tending to slightly resinous luster, titanite has a hardness of 5.5 and a weak cleavage. Its specific gravity varies between 3.52 and 3.54. Titanite's refractive index is 1.885–1.990 to 1.915–2.050 with a strong birefringence of 0.105 to 0.135 (biaxial positive); under the microscope this leads to a distinctive high relief which combined with the common yellow-brown colour and lozenge-shape cross-section makes the mineral easy to identify. Transparent specimens are noted for their strong trichroism, the three colours presented being dependent on body colour. Owing to the quenching effect of iron, sphene exhibits no fluorescence under ultraviolet light. Some titanite has been found to be metamict, in consequence of structural damage due to radioactive decomposition of the often significant thorium content. When viewed in thin section with a petrographic microscope, pleochroic halos can be observed in minerals surrounding a titanite crystal.

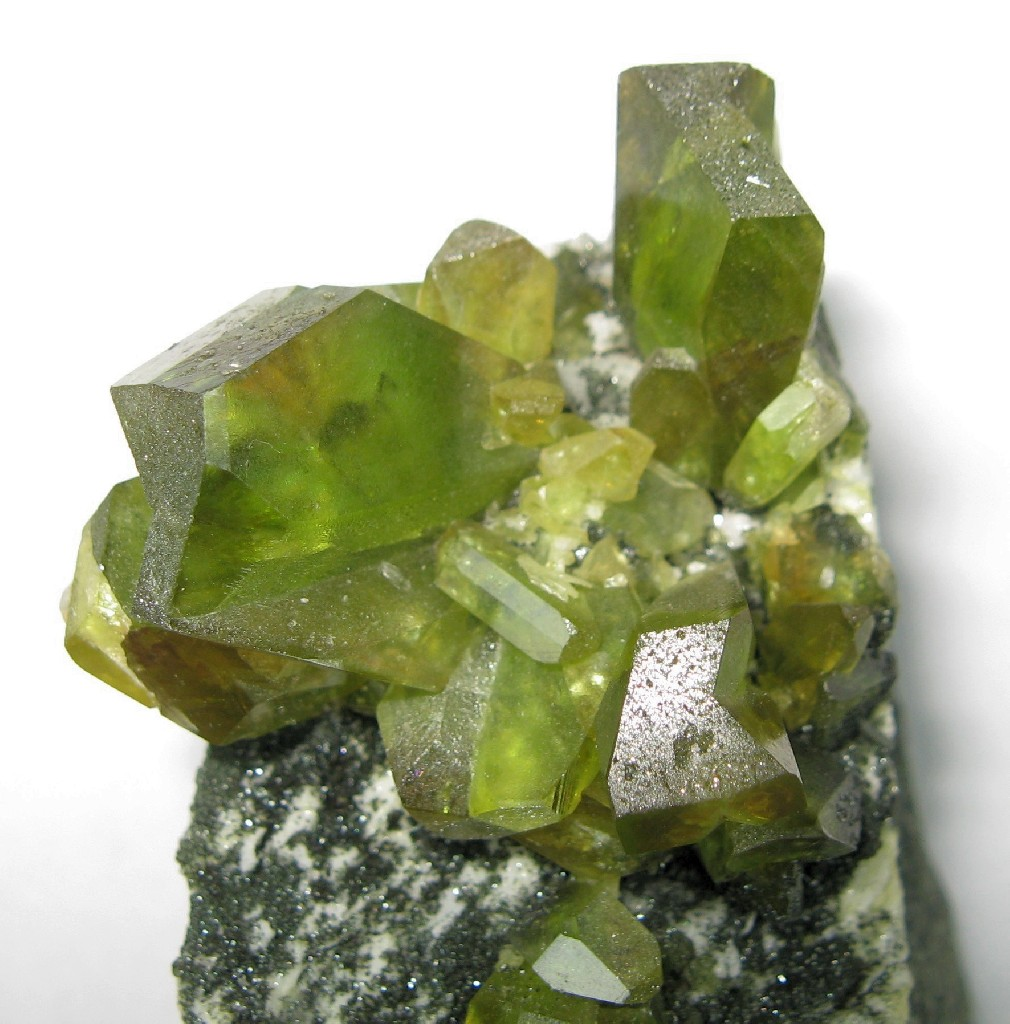
Green titanite crystal cluster from the Tormiq Valley, Haramosh Mountains, Pakistan

== Occurrence ==
Titanite occurs as a common accessory mineral in intermediate and felsic igneous rocks and associated pegmatites. It also occurs in metamorphic rocks such as gneiss and schists and skarns. Source localities include: Pakistan; Italy; Russia; China; Brazil; Tujetsch, St. Gothard, Switzerland; Madagascar; Tyrol, Austria; Renfrew County, Ontario, Canada; Sanford, Maine, Gouverneur, Diana, Rossie, Fine, Pitcairn, Brewster, New York and California in the US.

== Uses ==
Titanite is a source of titanium dioxide, TiO_{2}, used in pigments.

As a gemstone, titanite is usually some shade of chartreuse, but can be brown or black. Hue depends on iron (Fe) content, with low Fe content causing green and yellow colours, and high Fe content causing brown or black hues. Zoning is typical in titanite. It is prized for its exceptional dispersive power (0.051, B to G interval) which exceeds that of diamond. Jewelry use of titanite is limited, both because the stone is uncommon in gem quality and is relatively soft.

Titanite can also be used as a U-Pb geochronometer, specifically in metamorphic terranes.

== Image gallery ==
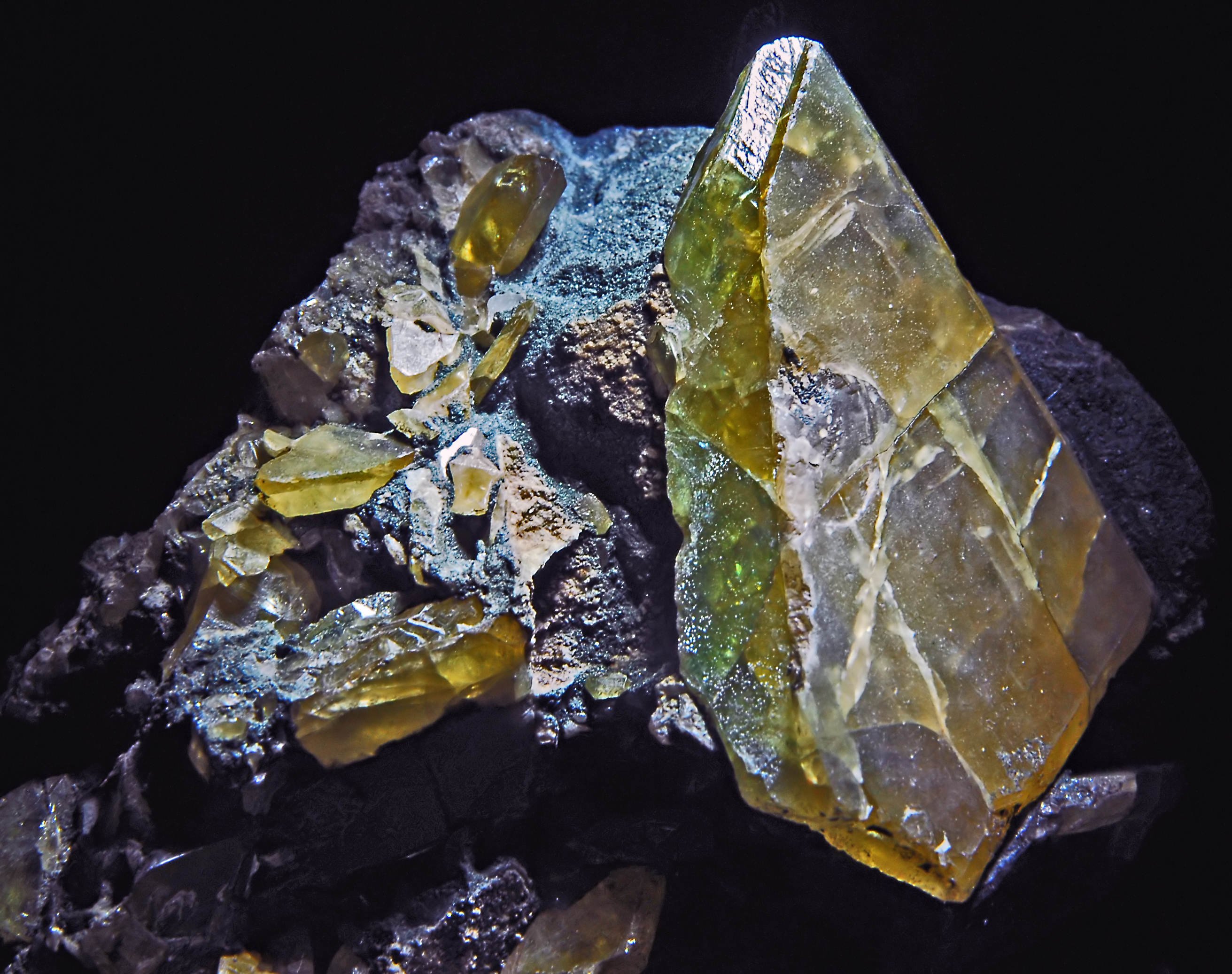
Specimen from the mineral collection of the Naturmuseum Senckenberg in Frankfurt am Main

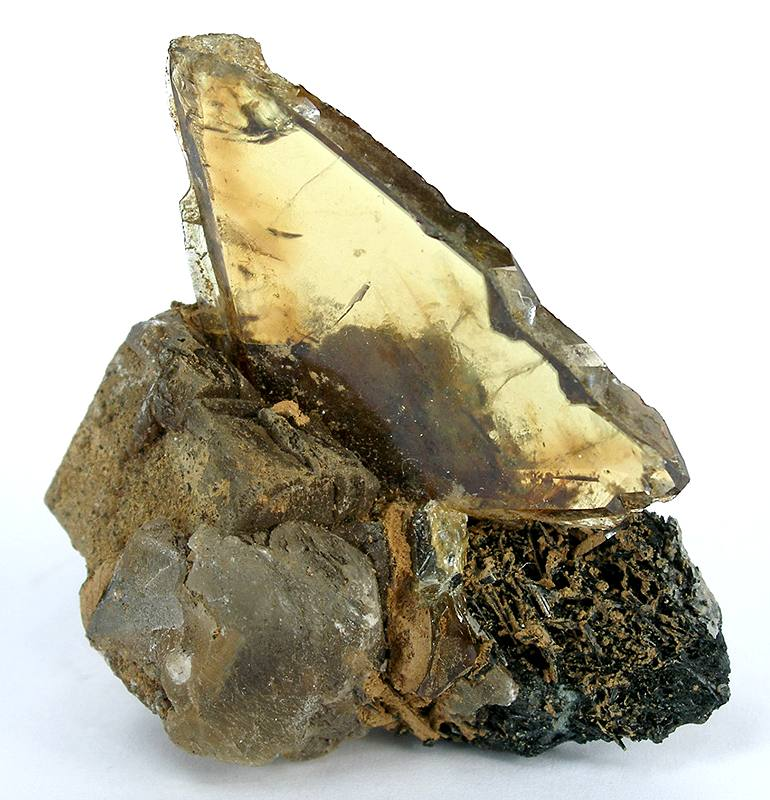
Titanite crystal that is totally gemmy and transparent, with a light olive-green color, perched on matrix of calcite and epidote

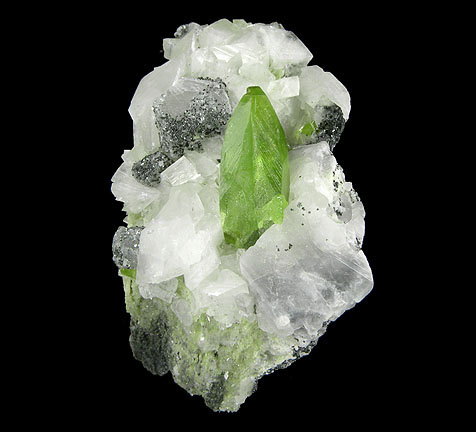
Bright green, twinned crystal of titanite with adularia and minor clinochlore on matrix

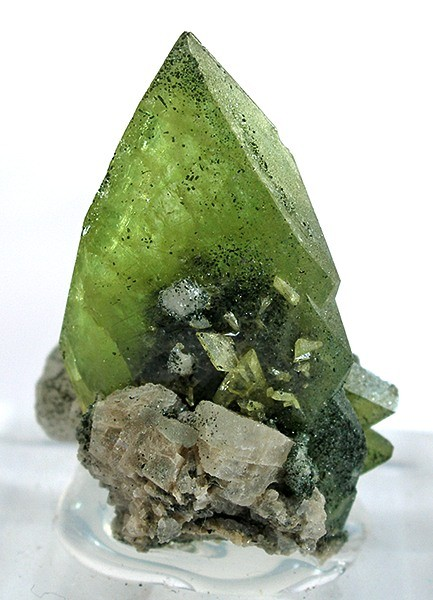
Olive-green titanite spear point set in matrix from Pakistan

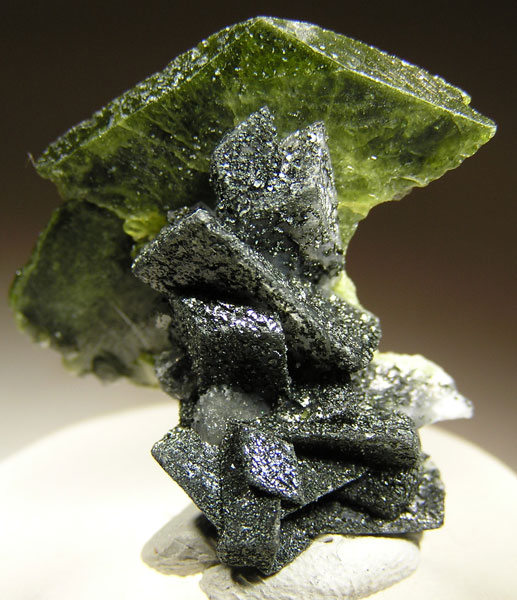
Green titanite crystal perched right at the top of a column of gray, chlorite-included crystals

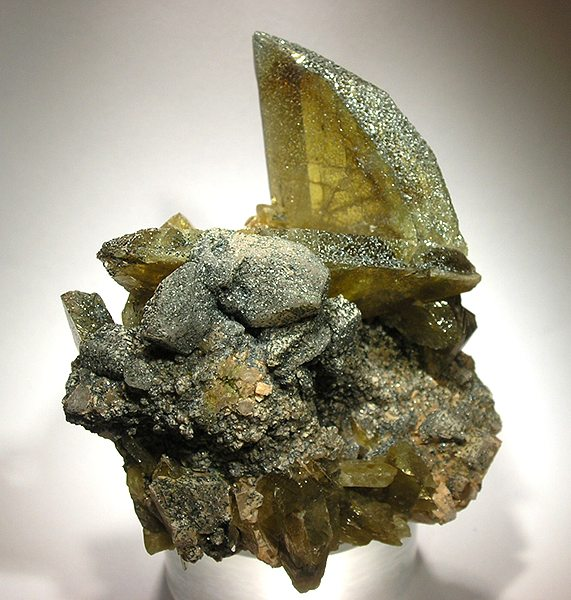
Yellow-green titanite twinned crystal perched vertically on the matrix
