= Mount Andrea Lawrence =

Mountain in northern Yosemite National Park

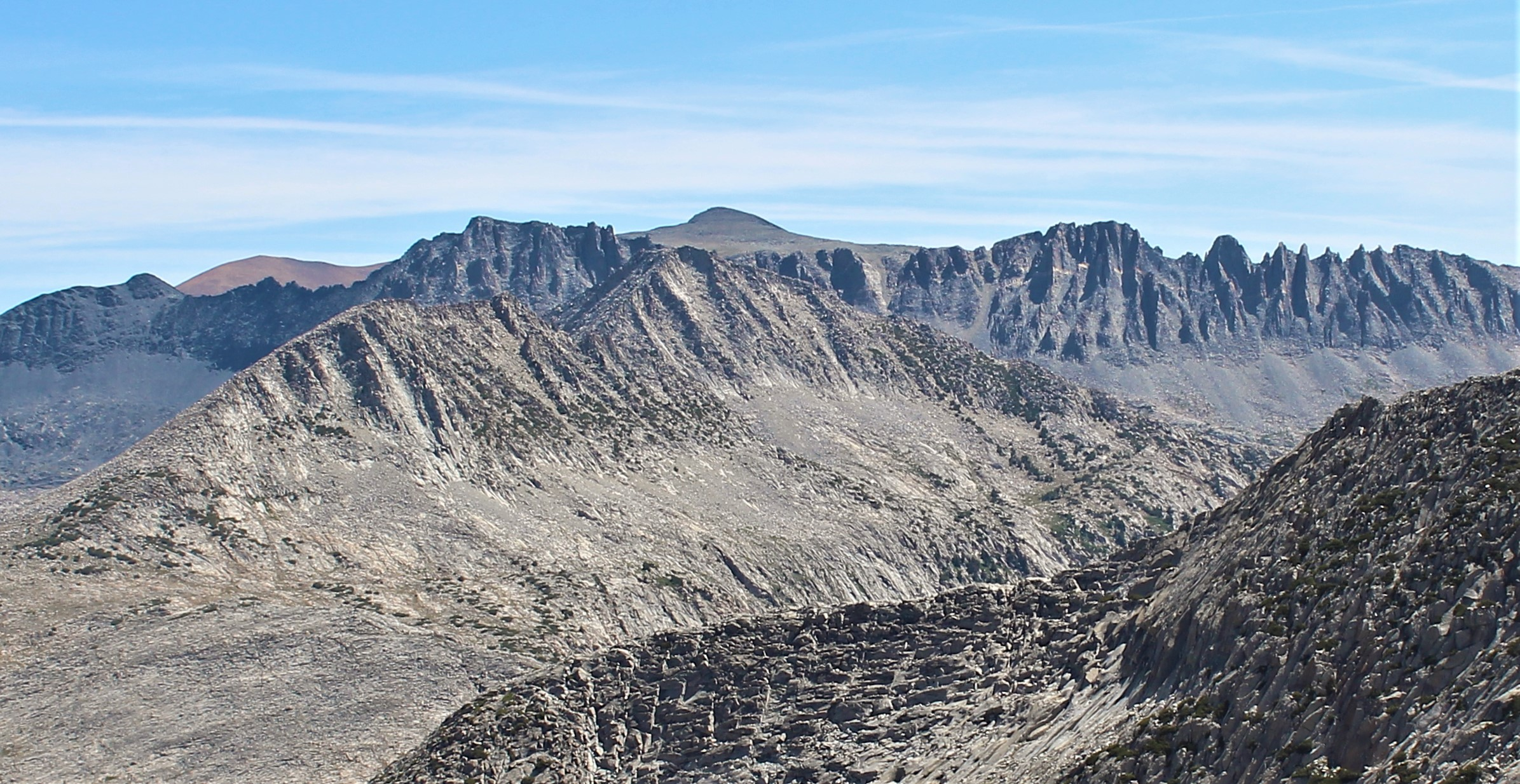
- Mount Andrea Lawrence (centered); Donohue Peak (left), Blacktop Peak (at top)

Highest point
- Elevation: 12,240 ft (3,730 m) NAVD 88
- Prominence: 800 ft (240 m)
- Coordinates: 37°47′N 119°13′W

Geography
- Location within California Location within the United States
- Location: Yosemite National Park, Tuolumne County, California, Mono County, California, U.S.
- Parent range: Sierra Nevada

Climbing
- Easiest route: class 2 to class 3

Mount Andrea Lawrence — informally, Gem Peak —is a mountain, in the northern part of Yosemite National Park. It is the 17th highest mountain in Yosemite National Park. It is southeast of Tuolumne Meadows.

== On Mount Andrea Lawrence's particulars ==
Mount Andrea Lawrence was named for Andrea Mead Lawrence, who was a conservationist, a three-time Olympian and also a former member of the Mono County Board of Supervisors.

On April 29, 2010, U.S. Senator Barbara Boxer and U.S. Representative Howard P. "Buck" McKeon announced legislation to rename Peak 12,240 in Mono County in memory of Lawrence. On January 20, 2013, a bill was signed, by President Obama, officially naming Mount Andrea Lawrence.

Mount Andrea Lawrence is near the John Muir Trail, and is also near Donohue Peak, Koip Peak, Blacktop Peak, Kuna Peak, Parker Peak, and Mount Wood.

== External links and references ==
- A topographic map, of the area of Mount Andrea Lawrence
