= Donohue Peak =

Mountain in eastern Yosemite National Park, near Tuolumne Meadows

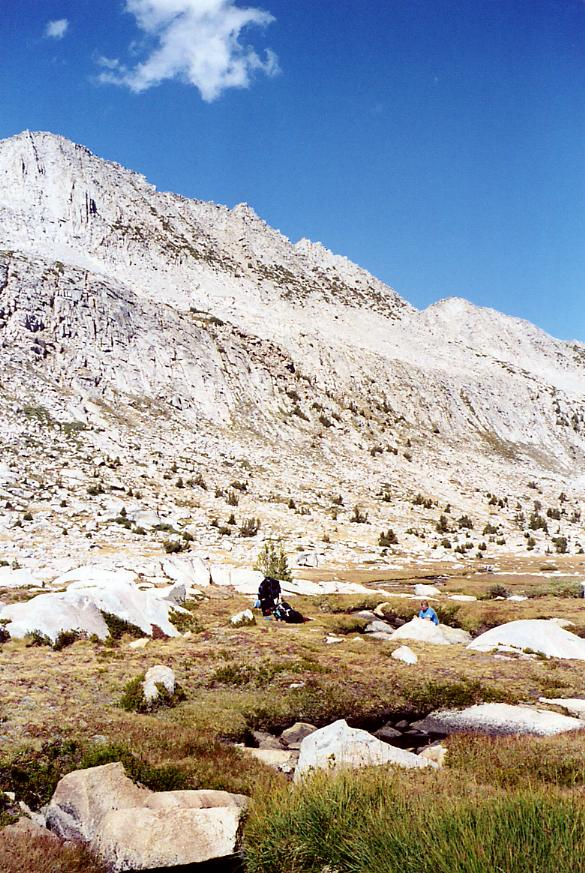
- Backside of Donohue Peak

Highest point
- Elevation: 12,023 ft (3,665 m) NAVD 88
- Prominence: 463 ft (141 m)
- Listing: Highest mountains of Yosemite NP
- Coordinates: 37°46′30″N 119°13′50″W

Geography
- Location within California Location within the United States
- Location: Yosemite National Park, Tuolumne County, California, U.S.
- Parent range: Ritter Range, Sierra Nevada

Climbing
- First ascent: In 1895, by Sergeant Donohue, on a horse
- Easiest route: class 1 and class 2, northwest face

Donohue Peak is a mountain, in the northern part of Yosemite National Park. Donohue Peak is along Yosemite National Park's eastern border, in the area of Tuolumne Meadows.

== On Donohue Peak's particulars ==
Both Donohue Pass and Lyell Canyon are nearby, as is Mount Andrea Lawrence, Johnson Peak and Rodgers Peak. Mount Ritter is south, and a bit east. The John Muir Trail passes near.

Donohue Peak is also near all of

Mountain	Distance
Peak 12223	1 mile (1.6 km)
Blacktop Peak	3.7 miles (6.0 km)
Kuna Peak	4.8 miles (7.7 km)
Koip Peak	5.0 miles (8.0 km)
Mount Lyell	5.4 miles (8.7 km)
Kuna Crest South	5.6 miles (9.0 km)

Donohue Peak has climbs, class 1 and class 2.
