= Kuna Peak =

Mountain peak in California, United States

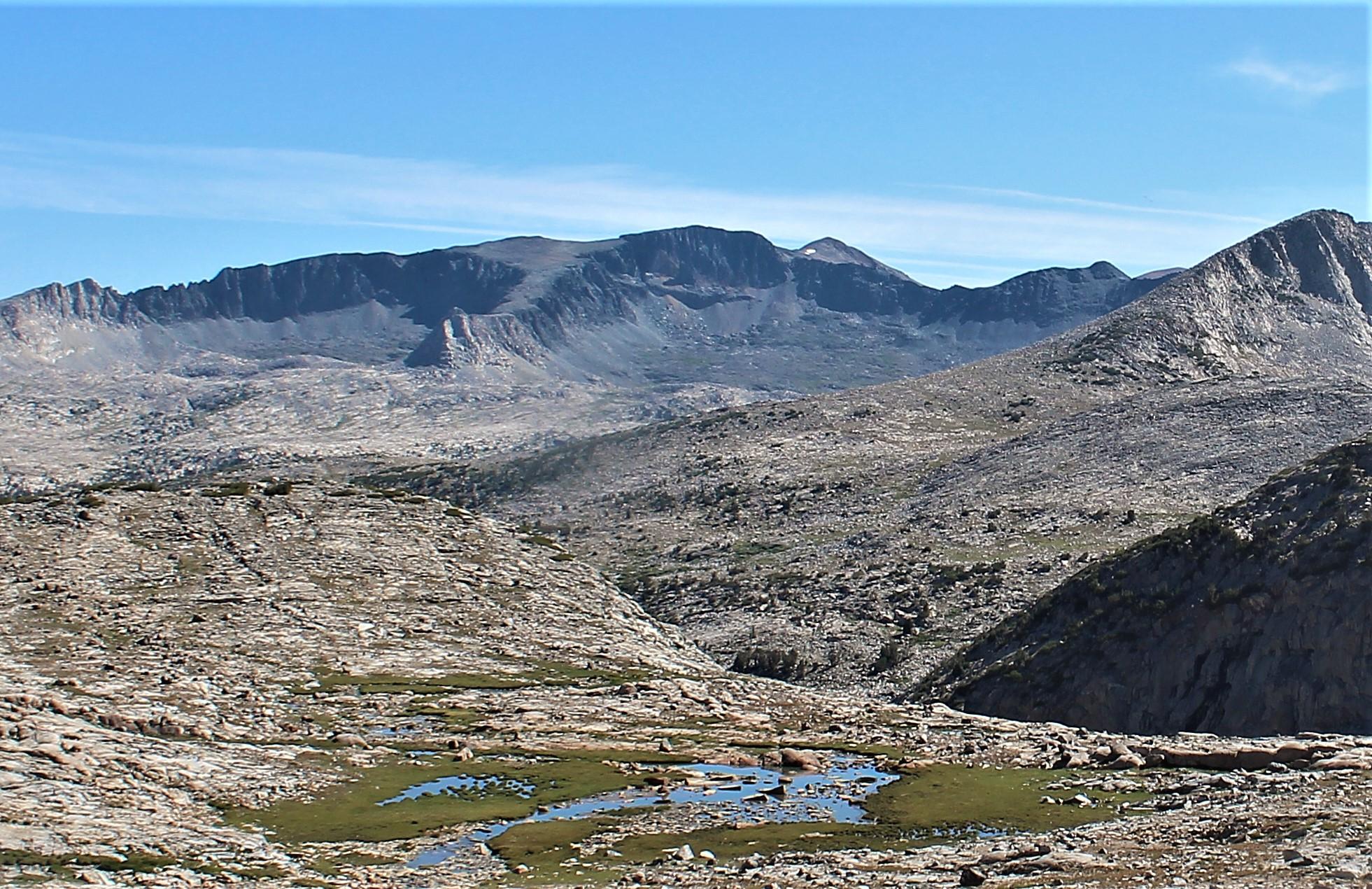
- Kuna Peak at center, southwest aspect

Highest point
- Elevation: 13,008 ft (3,965 m) NAVD 88
- Prominence: 1,922 ft (586 m)
- Listing: Western States Climbers Emblem peak
- Coordinates: 37°48′46″N 119°12′28″W

Geography
- Location within California
- Location: Mono and Tuolumne counties, California, U.S.
- Parent range: Kuna Crest, Sierra Nevada
- Topo map: USGS Koip Peak

Climbing
- First ascent: 1919 by Walter L. Huber
- Easiest route: Traverse from Koip Peak, class 2

Kuna Peak is a summit on the boundary between Mono and Tuolumne counties, in the United States, is the highest point on Kuna Crest. With an elevation of 13,008 feet (3,965 m), Kuna Peak is the 146th-highest summit in the state of California, and is the third-highest mountain in Yosemite National Park.

== Name ==
The word Kuna probably derives from a Shoshonean word meaning "fire," appearing in the Mono dialect of the area, with a meaning of firewood. On the summit, there are many jagged pieces of rock which resemble fire themselves; see Kuna Crest Granodiorite.

== Geography ==
Kuna Peak is flanked by shorter peaks all of which are nearly equal in height, such as Koip Peak, which is a mile to the east, and is 40 feet (12 m) feet lower. The western side of Kuna Peak is in Yosemite National Park, the eastern side being in the Ansel Adams Wilderness.

The following features are near Kuna Peak:

- Alger Lakes
- Bingaman Lake
- Donohue Peak
- Koip Glacier
- Koip Peak
- Koip Peak Pass
- Helen Lake
- Kuna Lake
- Kuna Glacier
- Mammoth Peak
- Mono Pass
- Mount Andrea Lawrence
- Mount Lewis
- Parker Pass
- Parker Peak
- Spillway Lake

=== Climate ===
Climate data for Kuna Peak 37.8193 N, 119.2202 W, Elevation: 12,431 ft (3,789 m) (1991–2020 normals)
Month	Jan	Feb	Mar	Apr	May	Jun	Jul	Aug	Sep	Oct	Nov	Dec	Year
Mean daily maximum °F (°C)	28.4 (−2.0)	27.1 (−2.7)	29.8 (−1.2)	33.8 (1.0)	41.3 (5.2)	50.7 (10.4)	58.4 (14.7)	57.9 (14.4)	52.4 (11.3)	43.8 (6.6)	34.7 (1.5)	28.4 (−2.0)	40.6 (4.8)
Daily mean °F (°C)	18.9 (−7.3)	17.0 (−8.3)	19.2 (−7.1)	22.3 (−5.4)	29.5 (−1.4)	38.6 (3.7)	45.9 (7.7)	45.2 (7.3)	39.8 (4.3)	32.2 (0.1)	24.6 (−4.1)	19.0 (−7.2)	29.4 (−1.5)
Mean daily minimum °F (°C)	9.3 (−12.6)	6.8 (−14.0)	8.6 (−13.0)	10.7 (−11.8)	17.8 (−7.9)	26.4 (−3.1)	33.4 (0.8)	32.5 (0.3)	27.2 (−2.7)	20.7 (−6.3)	14.4 (−9.8)	9.6 (−12.4)	18.1 (−7.7)
Average precipitation inches (mm)	12.00 (305)	9.65 (245)	9.04 (230)	5.24 (133)	2.73 (69)	0.66 (17)	0.61 (15)	0.43 (11)	0.61 (15)	2.92 (74)	4.02 (102)	10.16 (258)	58.07 (1,474)
Source: PRISM Climate Group

== Gallery ==
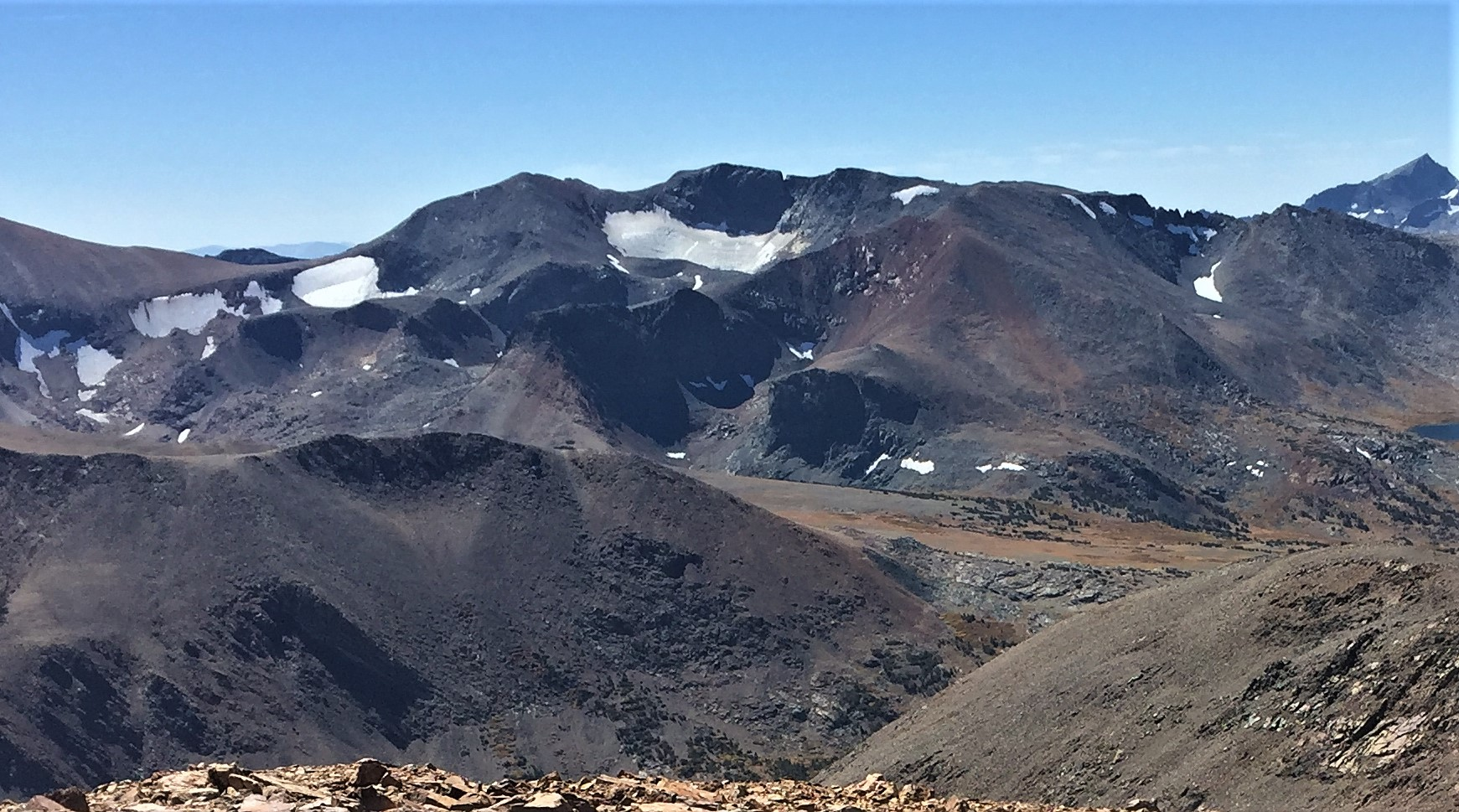
North aspect of Kuna Peak centered in the distance, as seen from Mount Gibbs.

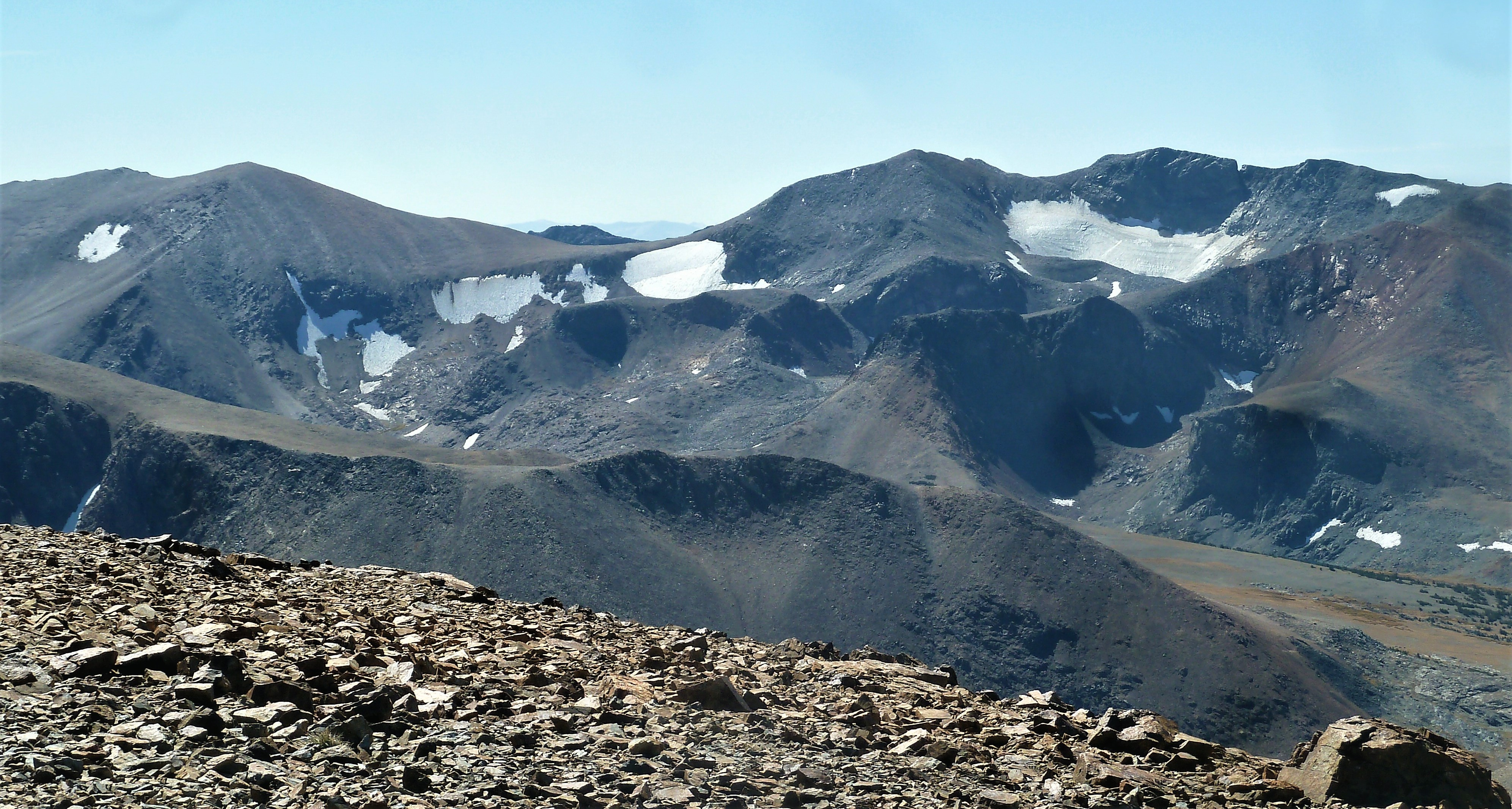
North aspects of Parker Peak (left), Koip Peak (right of center), and Kuna Peak (right) as seen from Mount Gibbs.
