= Mount Wood (California) =

Mountain in the American state of California

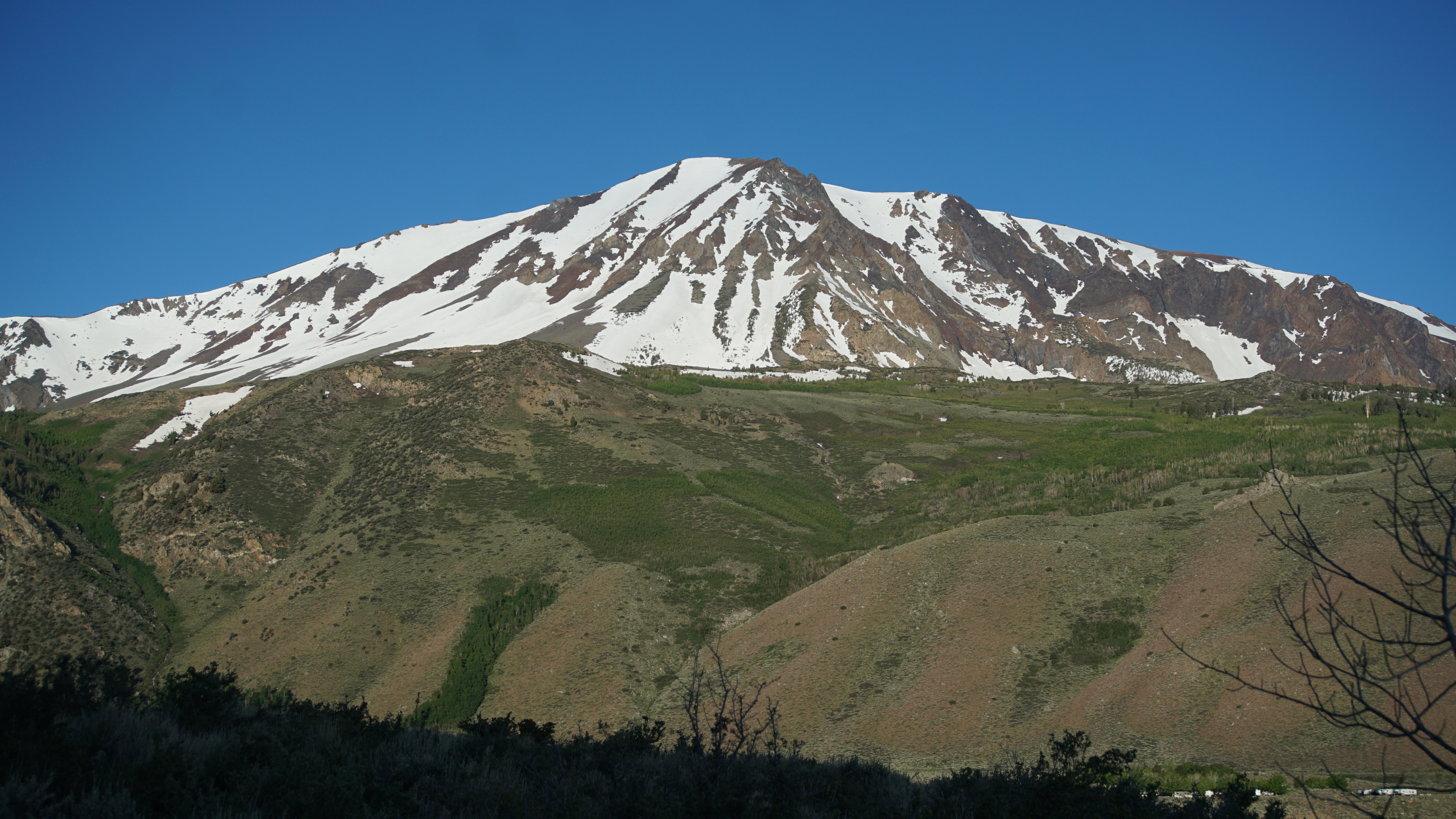
- East aspect

Highest point
- Elevation: 12,657 ft (3,858 m)
- Prominence: 177 ft (54 m)
- Parent peak: Parker Peak (12,861 ft)
- Isolation: 1.06 mi (1.71 km)
- Coordinates: 37°48′33″N 119°09′57″W

Naming
- Etymology: Captain Abram Wood

Geography
- Location within California Location within the United States
- Country: United States
- State: California
- County: Mono
- Protected area: Ansel Adams Wilderness
- Parent range: Sierra Nevada
- Topo map: USGS Koip Peak

Geology
- Rock age: Cretaceous
- Mountain type: Fault block
- Rock type: Metamorphic rock

Climbing
- First ascent: Unknown
- Easiest route: class 2 East slope

Mount Wood is a 12,657-foot-elevation (3,858-meter) mountain summit located just east of the crest of the Sierra Nevada mountain range, in Mono County of northern California, United States. It is situated in the Ansel Adams Wilderness, on land managed by Inyo National Forest. It is approximately 6.0 miles (9.7 km) northwest of the community of June Lake, two miles outside of Yosemite National Park's eastern boundary, and one mile east-southeast of line parent Parker Peak. Topographic relief is significant as the summit rises over 5,500 feet (1,700 meters) above Grant Lake in three miles. The mountain is visible from the June Lake Loop.

== History ==
This geographical feature was named in 1894 by Lieutenant Nathaniel Fish McClure who prepared a map of Yosemite Park for use by Army troops. The toponym honors Captain Abram Epperson Wood, 4th Cavalry US Army, the first acting military superintendent of Yosemite National Park from 1891 to 1893, shortly before he died in 1894. The US Army had jurisdiction over Yosemite National Park from 1891 to 1914, and each summer 150 cavalrymen traveled from the Presidio of San Francisco to patrol the park. This landform's toponym has been officially adopted by the U.S. Board on Geographic Names.

== Climate ==
According to the Köppen climate classification system, Mount Wood is located in an alpine climate zone. Most weather fronts originate in the Pacific Ocean, and travel east toward the Sierra Nevada mountains. As fronts approach, they are forced upward by the peaks (orographic lift), causing them to drop their moisture in the form of rain or snowfall onto the range. Precipitation runoff from this mountain drains into Parker and Alger Creeks, both of which are tributaries of Rush Creek.

== Gallery ==
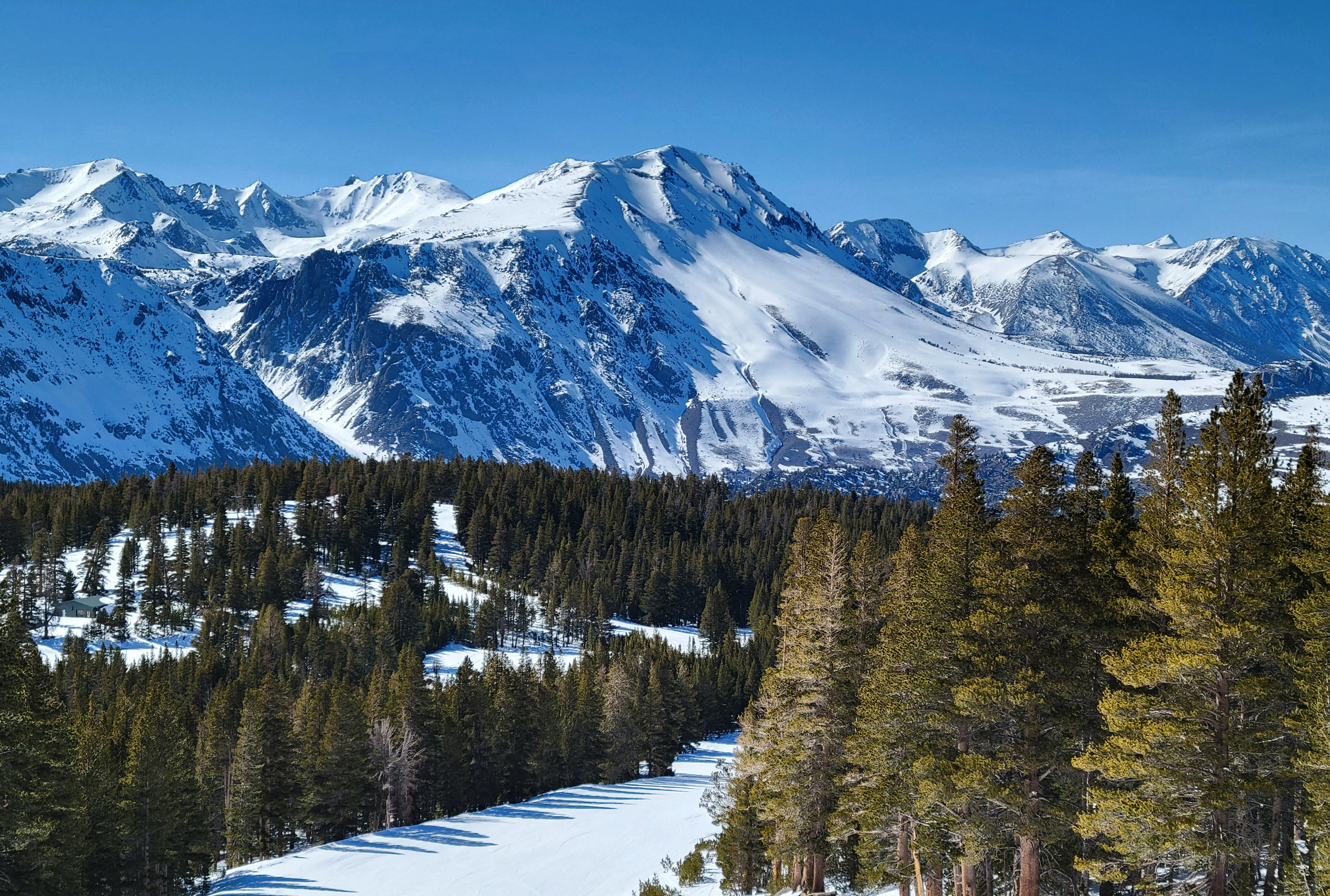
Southeast aspect viewed from June Mountain ski area

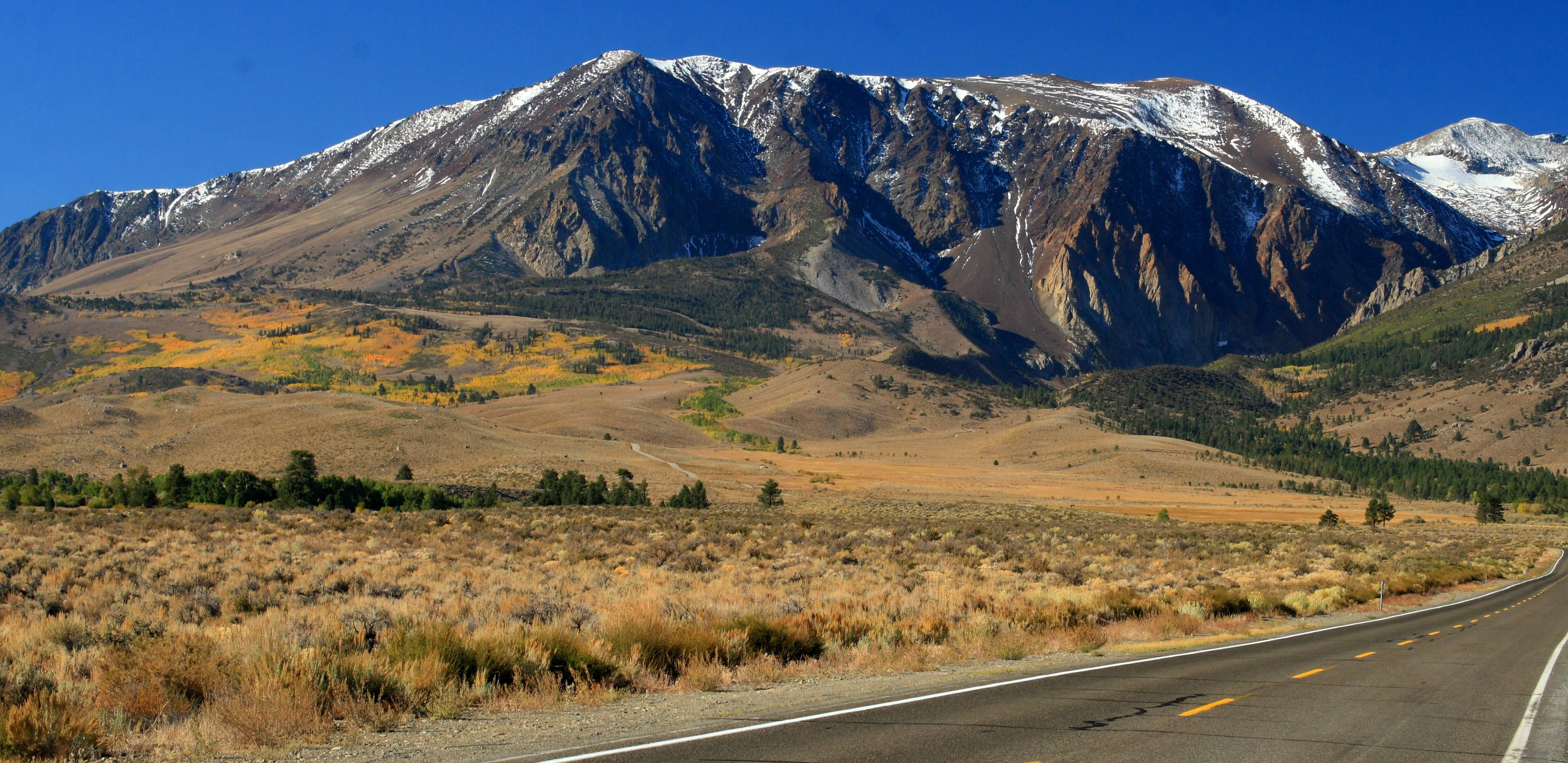
Mount Wood (left of center), Parker Peak, Koip Peak

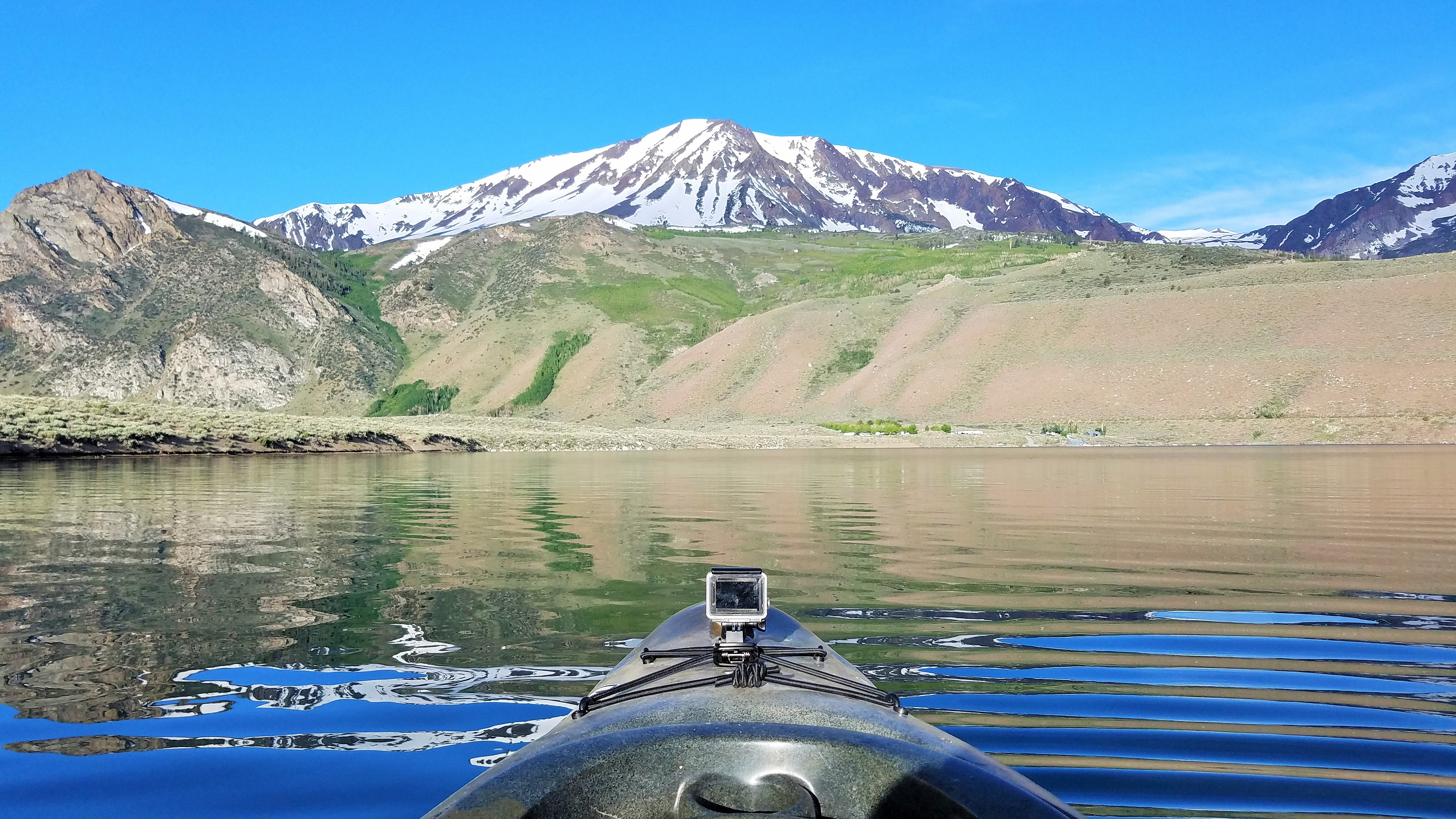
East aspect of Mount Wood seen from Grant Lake

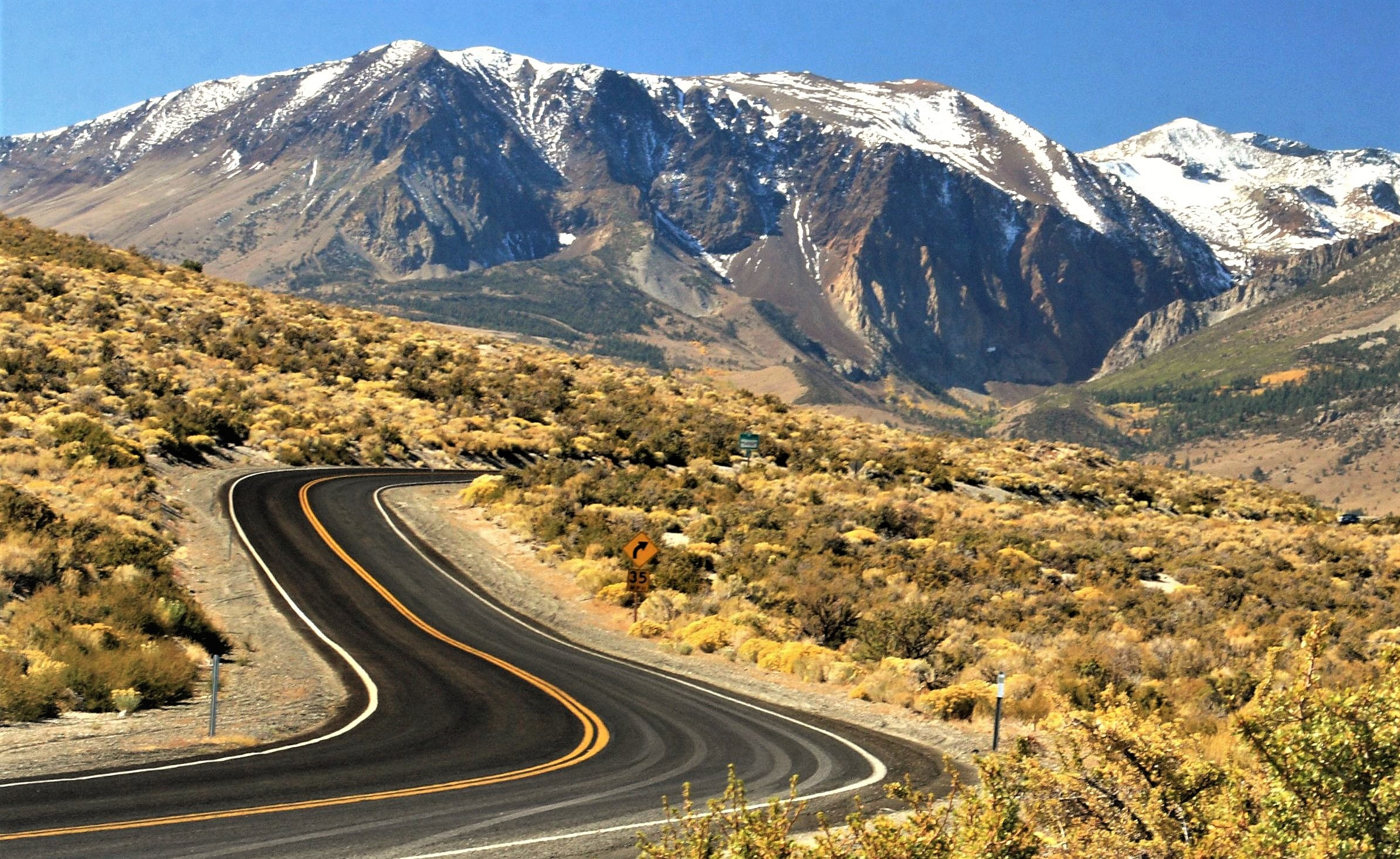
Mount Wood, Parker Peak, with Koip Peak in upper right corner

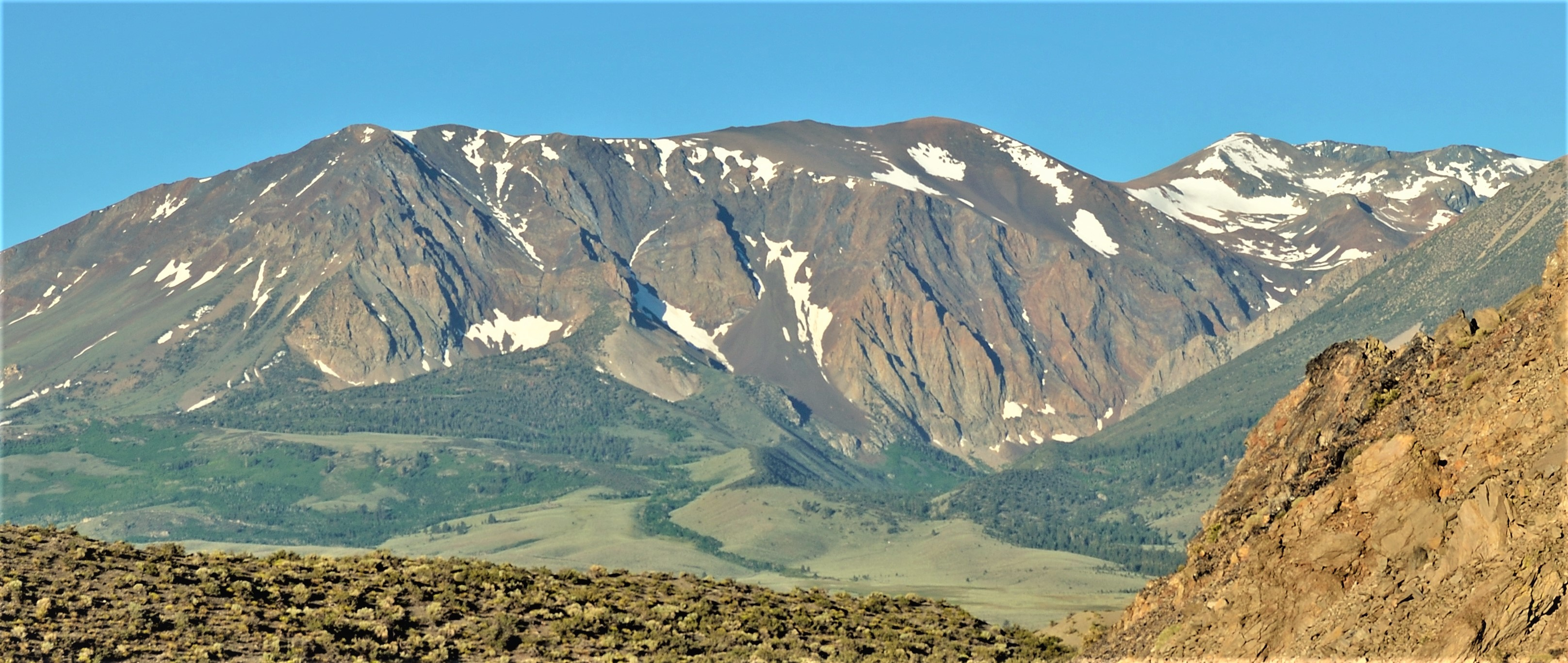
Mount Wood and Parker Peak seen from Panum Crater

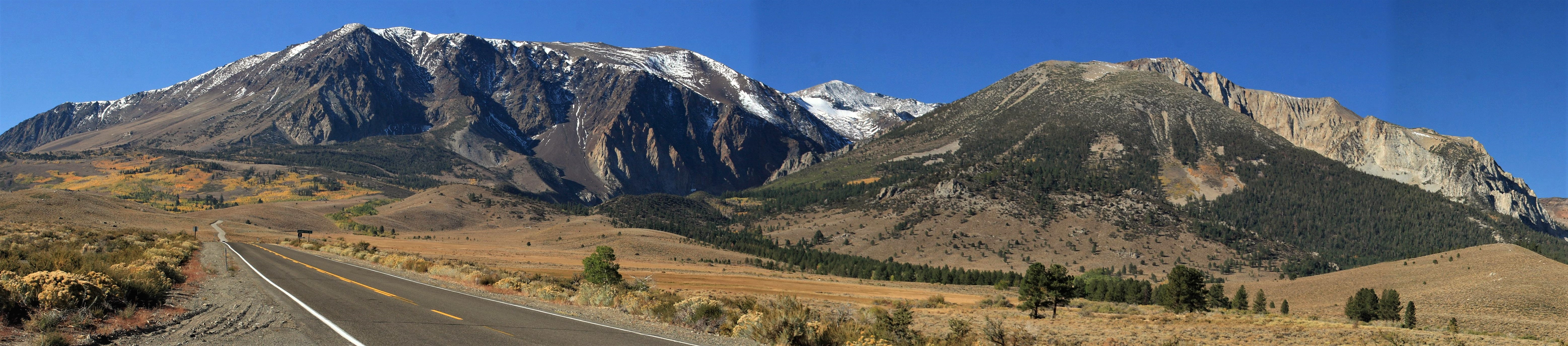
Mount Wood, Parker Peak, Koip Peak, and Mount Lewis

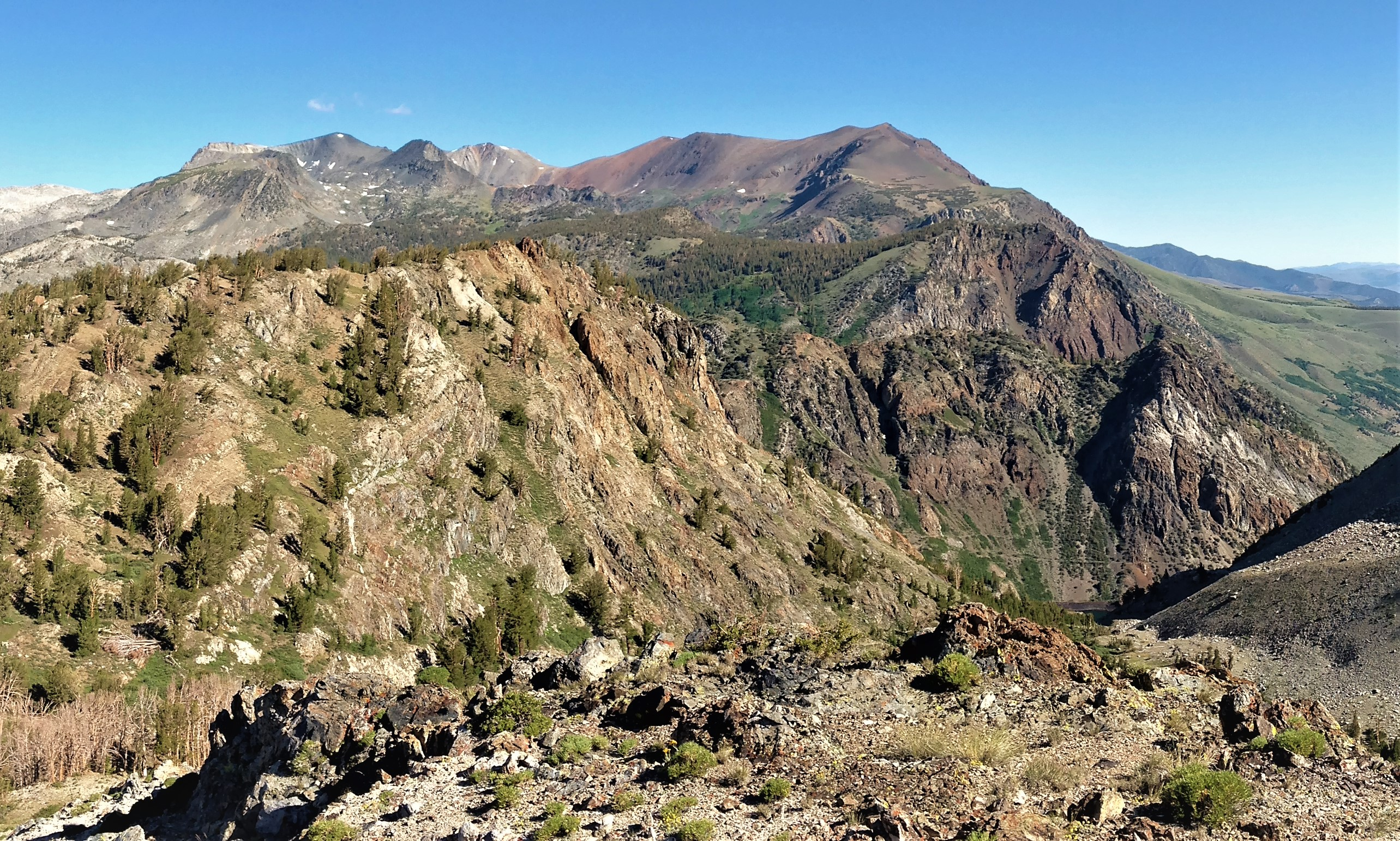
Southeast aspect of Mt. Wood seen from Rush Creek Trail near Spooky Meadow on Carson Peak. Wood is the highest peak to the right.

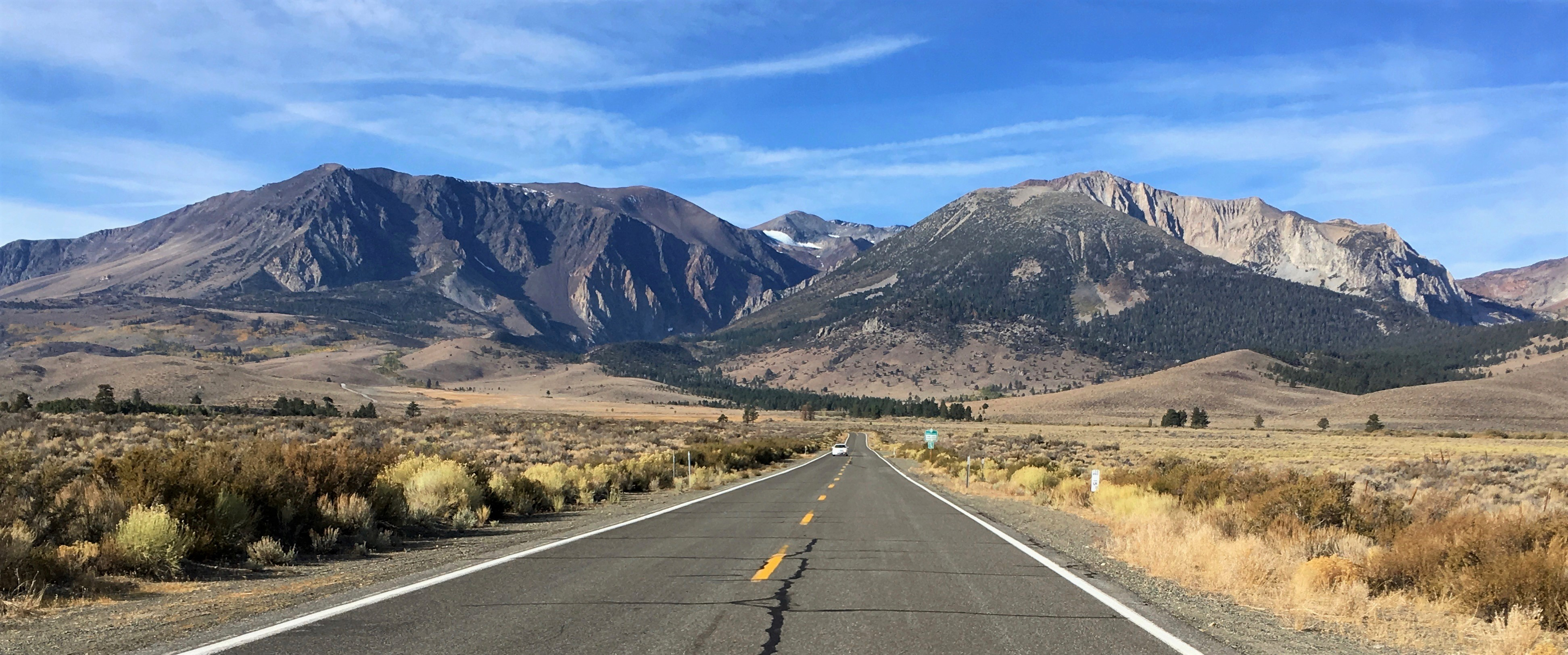
Mount Wood (furthest to left), Parker Peak, Koip Peak, and Mount Lewis from June Lake Loop

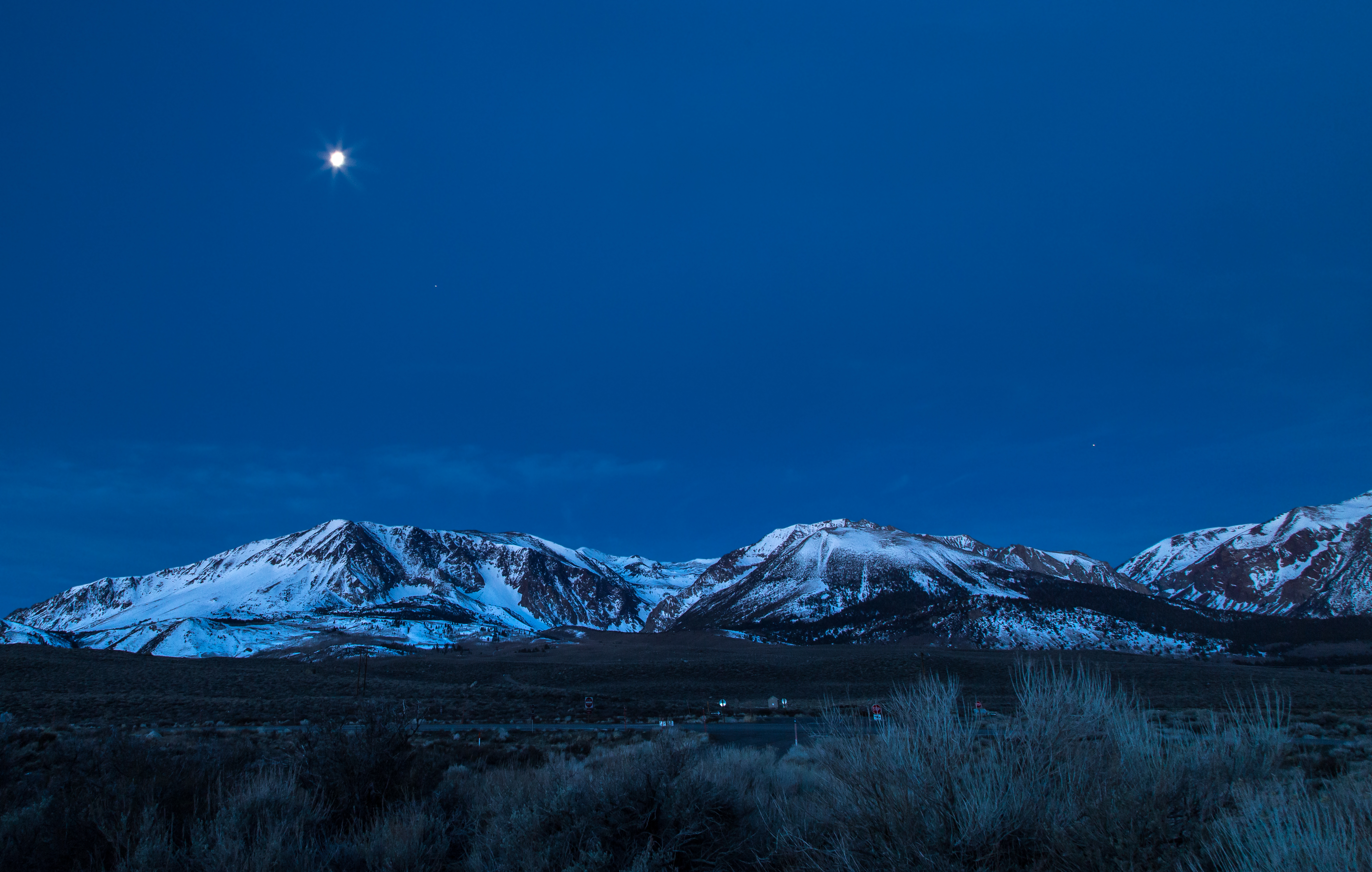
Mount Wood directly under the moon

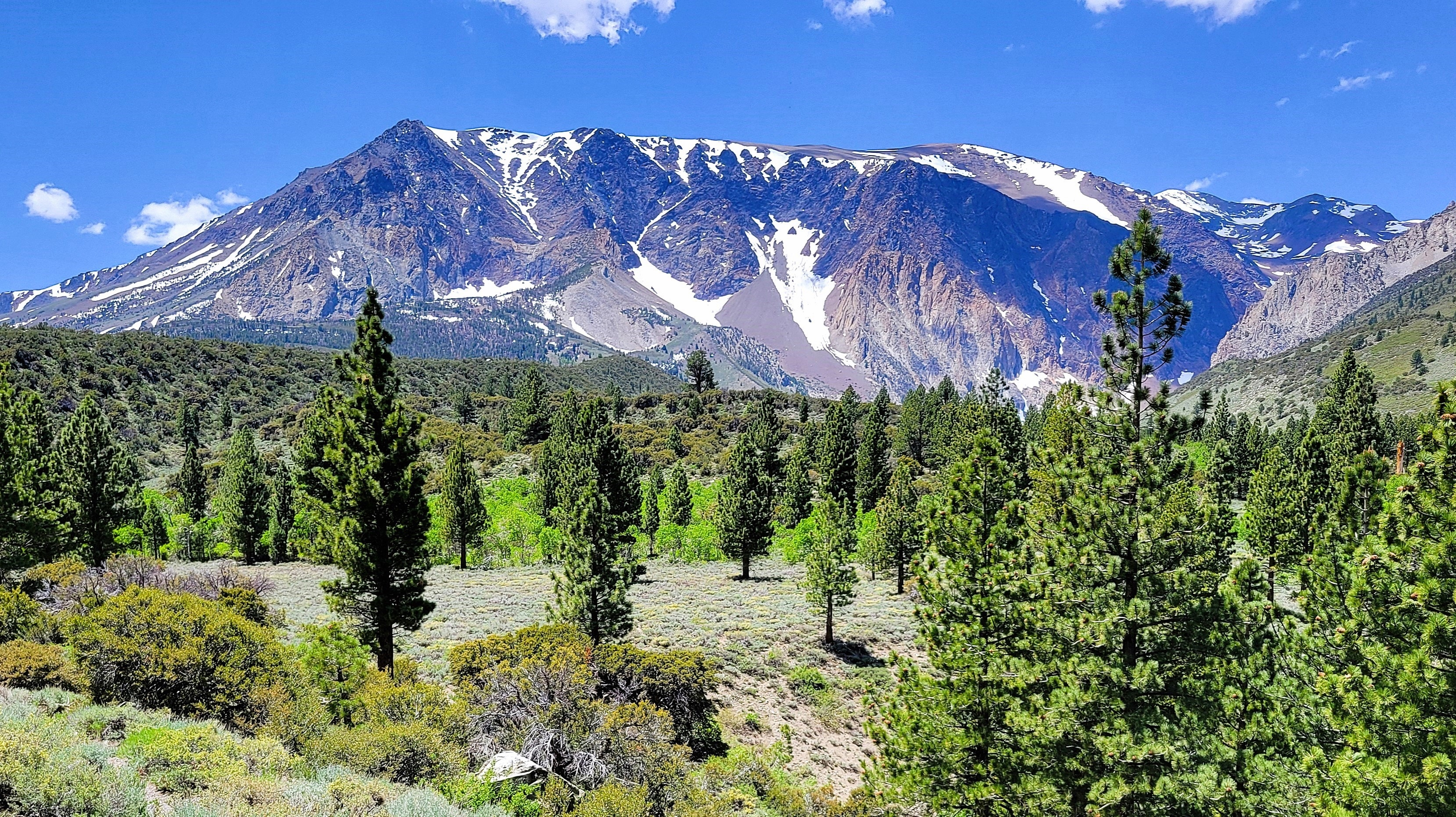

== See also ==
- Geology of the Yosemite area
- Gale Peak
- Mount Lewis (California)
