= Mount Lewis (California) =

Mountain in the state of California

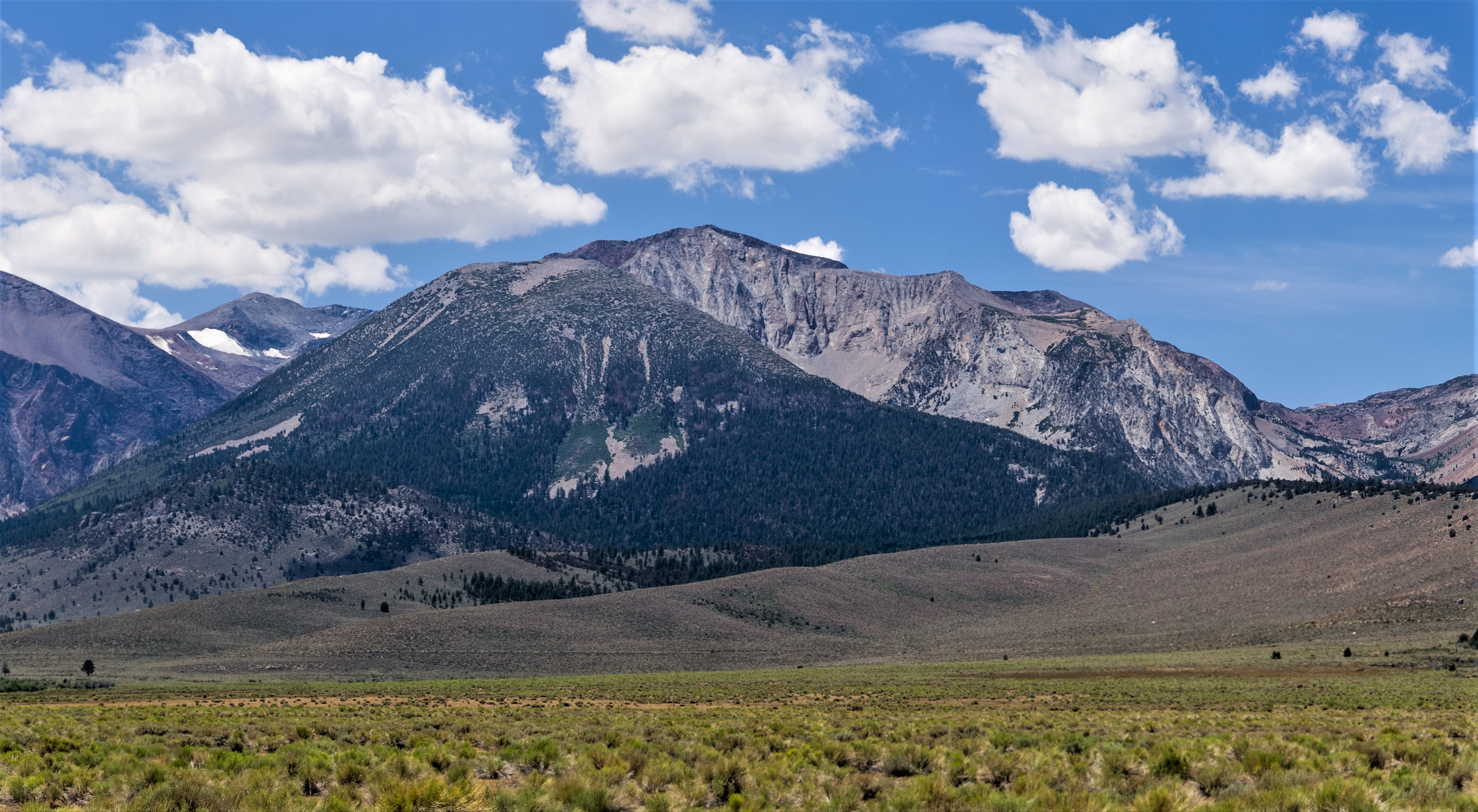
- East aspect

Highest point
- Elevation: 12,350 ft (3,764 m)
- Prominence: 1,200 ft (370 m)
- Parent peak: Kuna Peak (13,002 ft)
- Isolation: 2.00 mi (3.22 km)
- Listing: Vagmarken Club Sierra Crest List
- Coordinates: 37°50′33″N 119°11′23″W

Dimensions
- Length: 3 mi (4.8 km) North-South
- Width: 2 mi (3.2 km) East-West

Naming
- Etymology: Washington Bartlett "Dusty" Lewis

Geography
- Location within California Location within the United States
- Interactive map of Mount Lewis
- Country: United States
- State: California
- County: Mono
- Protected area: Ansel Adams Wilderness
- Parent range: Sierra Nevada
- Topo map: USGS Koip Peak

Geology
- Rock age: Cretaceous
- Mountain type: Fault block
- Rock type(s): Metamorphic rock, Granodiorite

Climbing
- First ascent: Unknown
- Easiest route: class 2 West slope

Mount Lewis is a 12,350-foot-elevation (3,764-meter) mountain summit located along the crest of the Sierra Nevada mountain range, in Mono County of northern California, United States. It is situated in the Ansel Adams Wilderness, on land managed by Inyo National Forest. The summit lies less than one mile outside of Yosemite National Park's eastern boundary, and some of the lower western slope lies within the park. The mountain rises 1.8 miles (2.9 km) southeast of Mono Pass, 1.5 miles (2.4 km) northeast of Parker Pass, and two miles north of Parker Peak, which is the nearest higher neighbor. Topographic relief is significant as it rises over 5,200 feet (1,600 meters) above Grant Lake in four miles which makes the mountain visible from Highway 395.

== Etymology ==
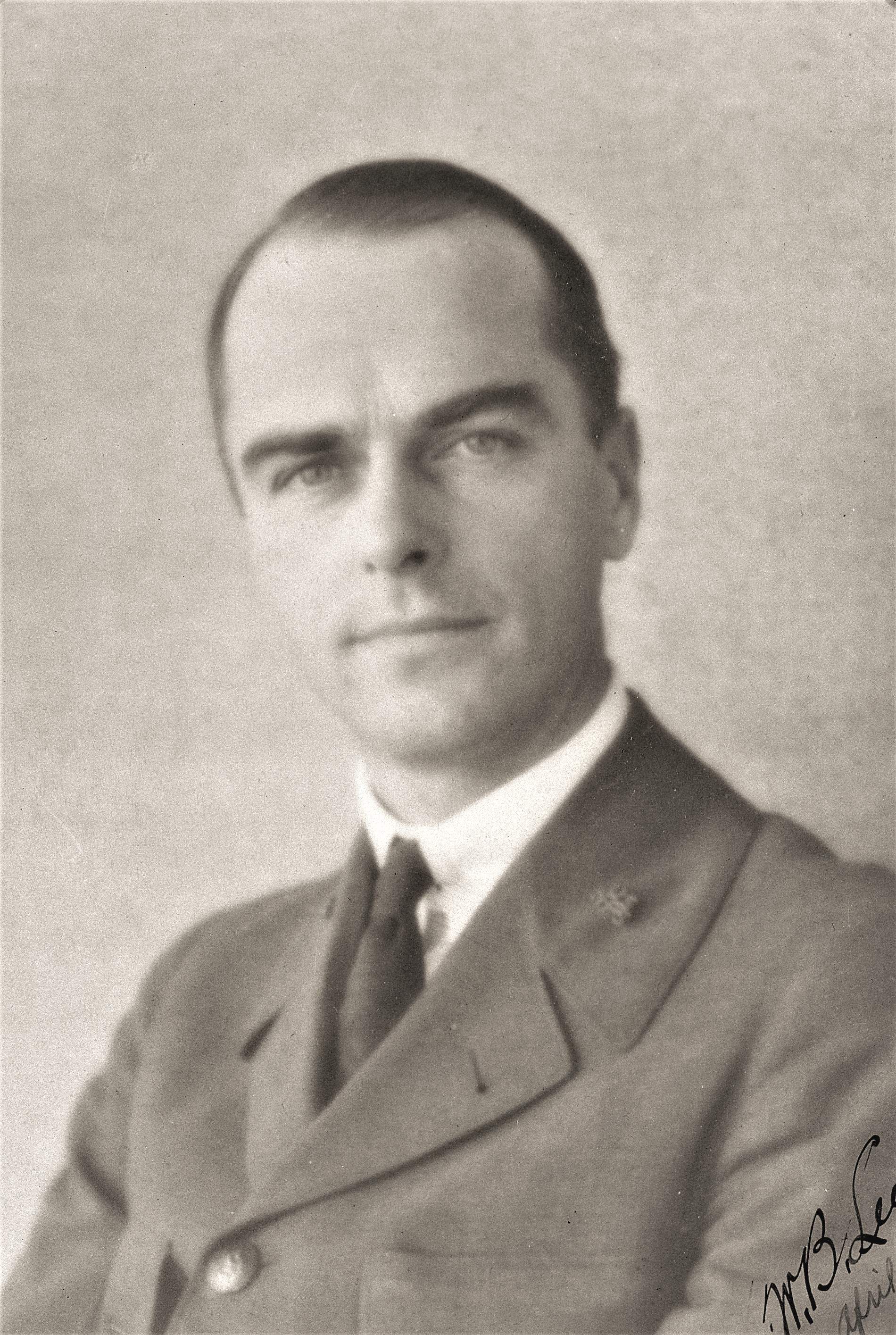
W.B. Lewis

The mountain is named in memory of Washington Bartlett "Dusty" Lewis (1884–1930), Superintendent of Yosemite National Park for 11 years from 1917 through 1928. He played a leading part in the development of the park and in standardizing uniforms for National Park Service employees. This geographical feature's name was officially adopted in 1930 by the U.S. Board on Geographic Names. Prior to 1930 this landform was known as Johnson Peak.

== Climate ==
According to the Köppen climate classification system, Mount Lewis is located in an alpine climate zone. Most weather fronts originate in the Pacific Ocean, and travel east toward the Sierra Nevada mountains. As fronts approach, they are forced upward by the peaks (orographic lift), causing them to drop their moisture in the form of rain or snowfall onto the range. Precipitation runoff from this mountain drains into headwaters of Parker and Walker Creeks, both of which are tributaries of Rush Creek, which empties into Mono Lake.

== Gallery ==
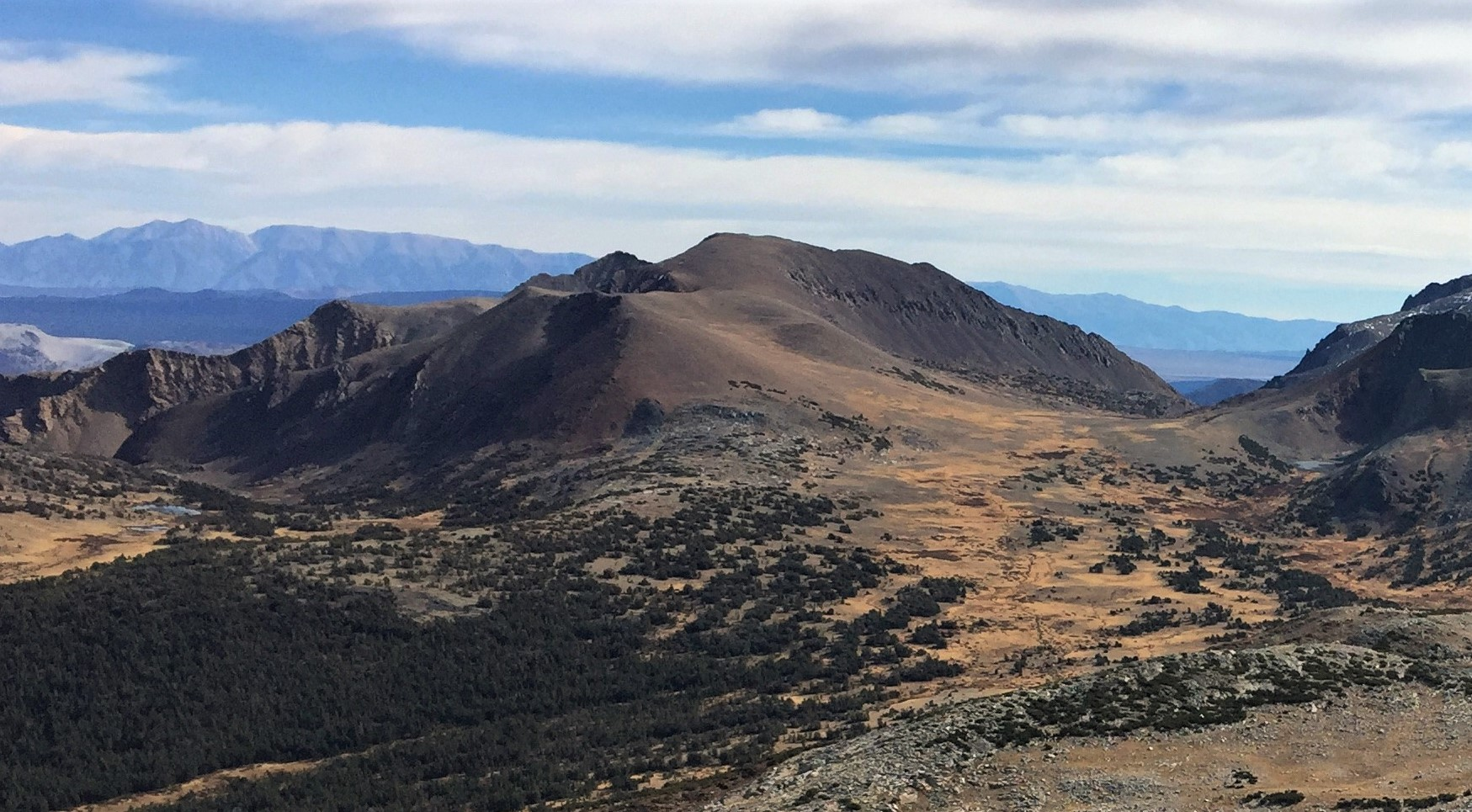
West aspect seen from Mammoth Peak

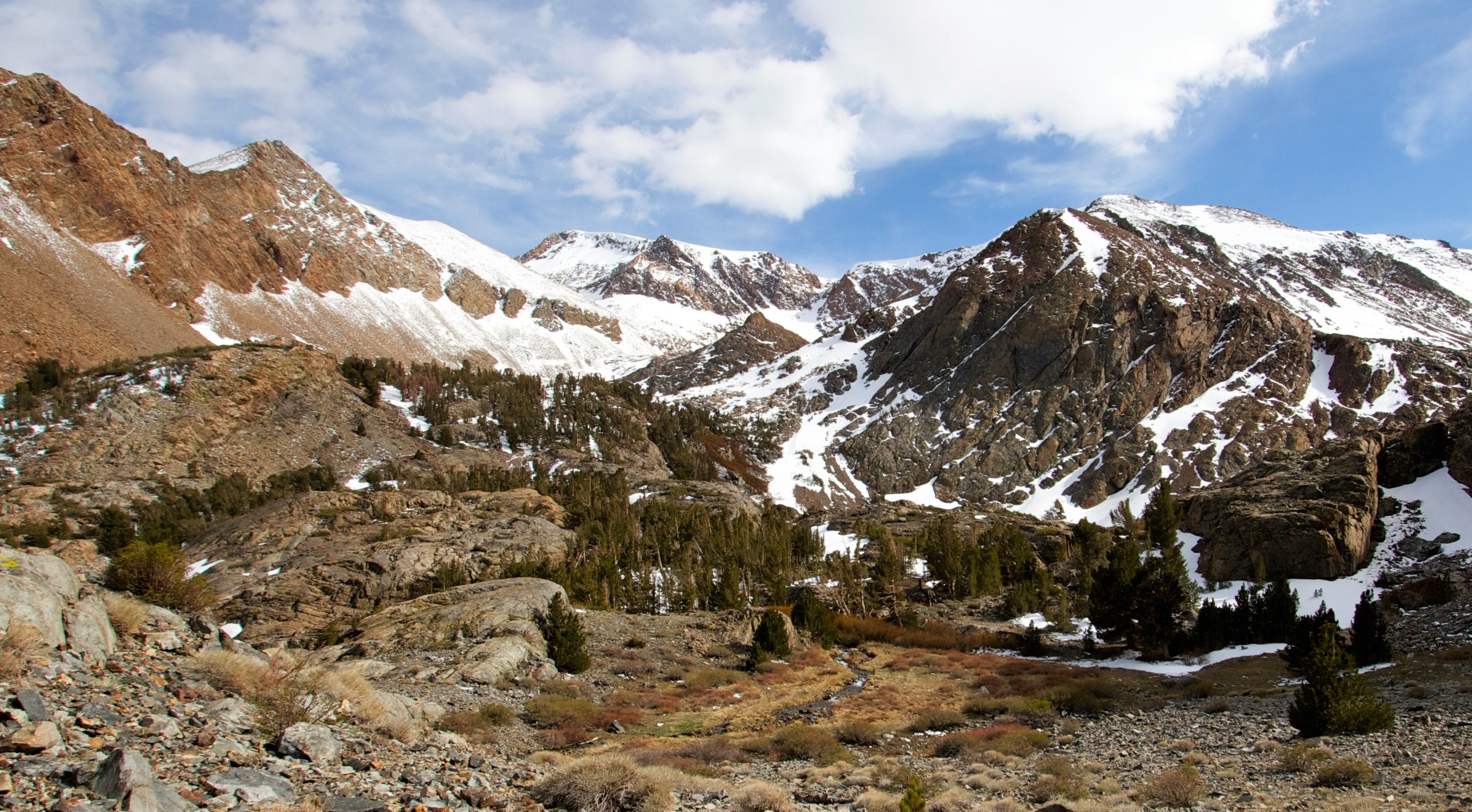
North aspect of Mt. Lewis from Mono Pass Trail

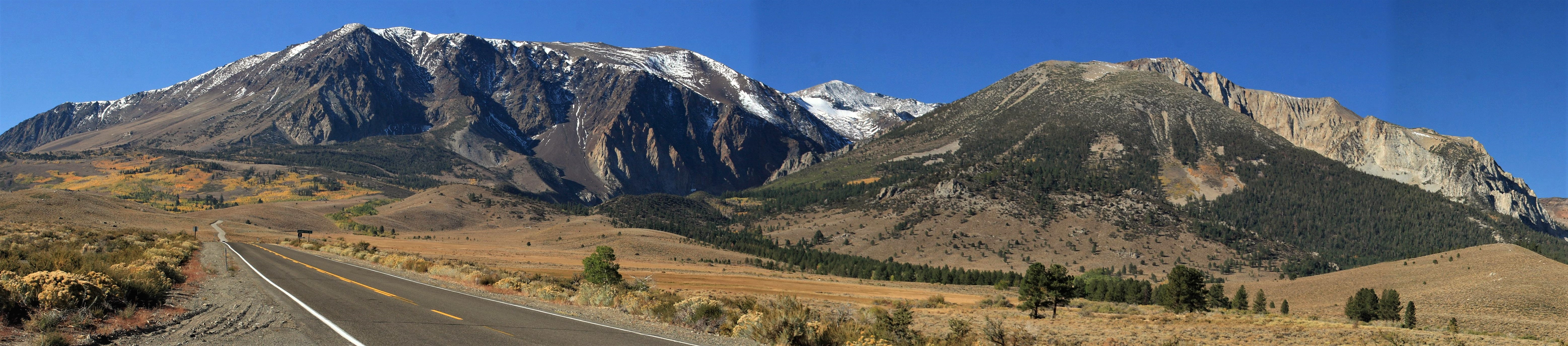
Mount Wood, Parker Peak, Koip Peak, and Mount Lewis (right)

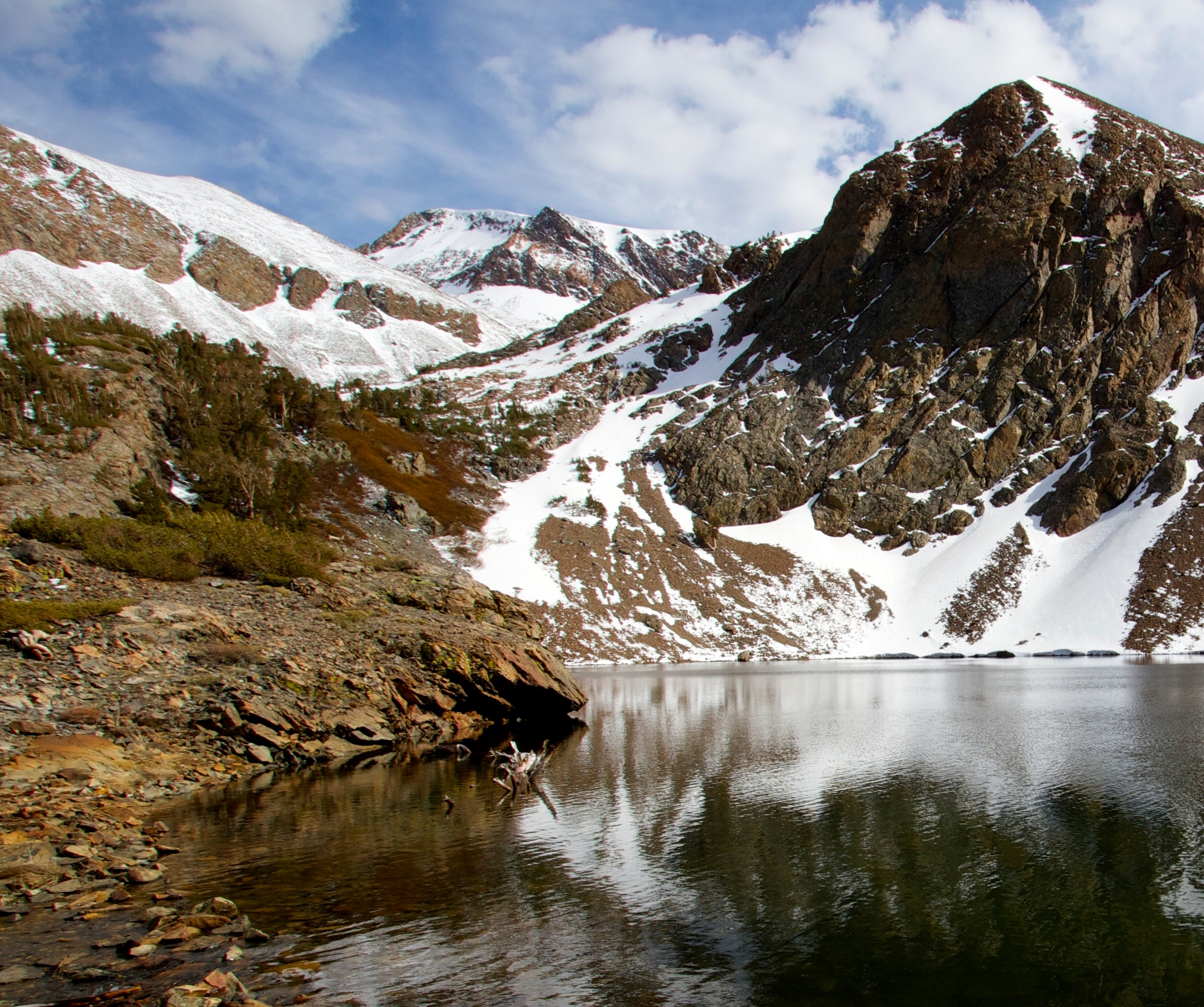
Mt. Lewis above Lower Sardine Lake

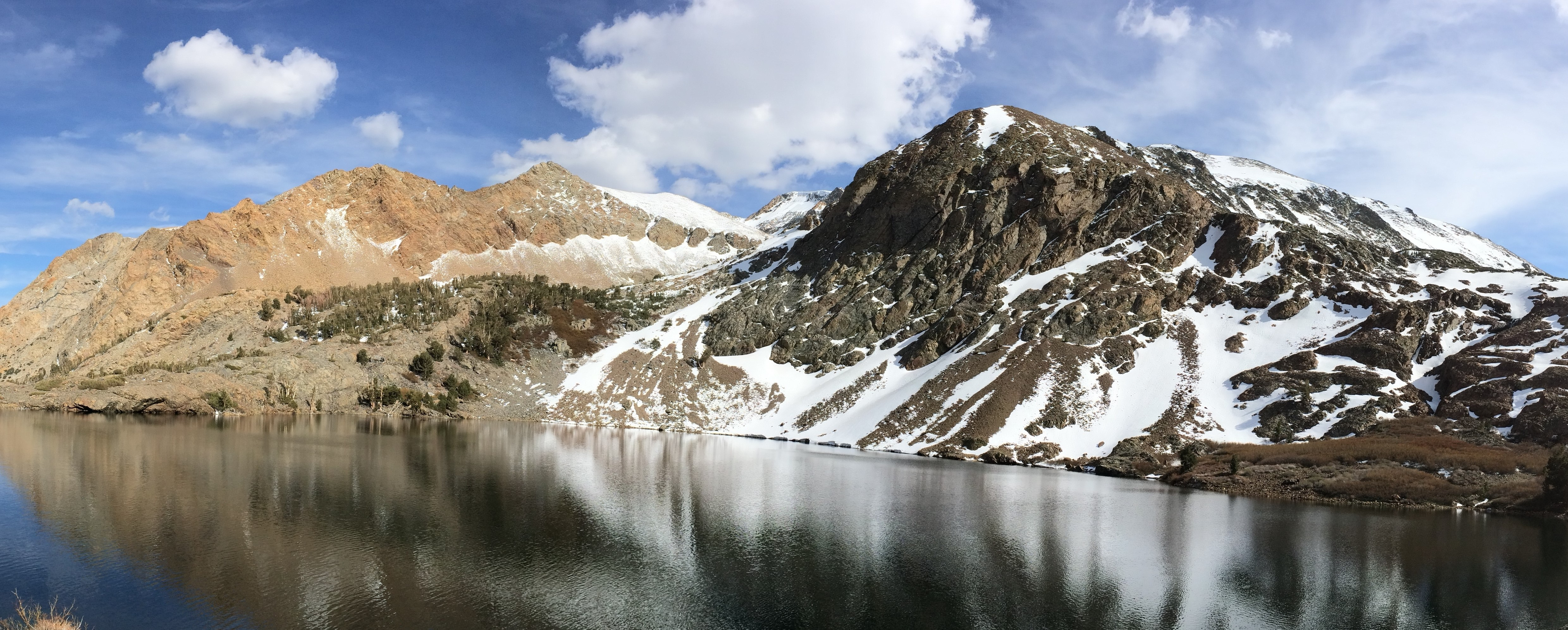
Mt. Lewis rises above Lower Sardine Lake (summit centered in back)

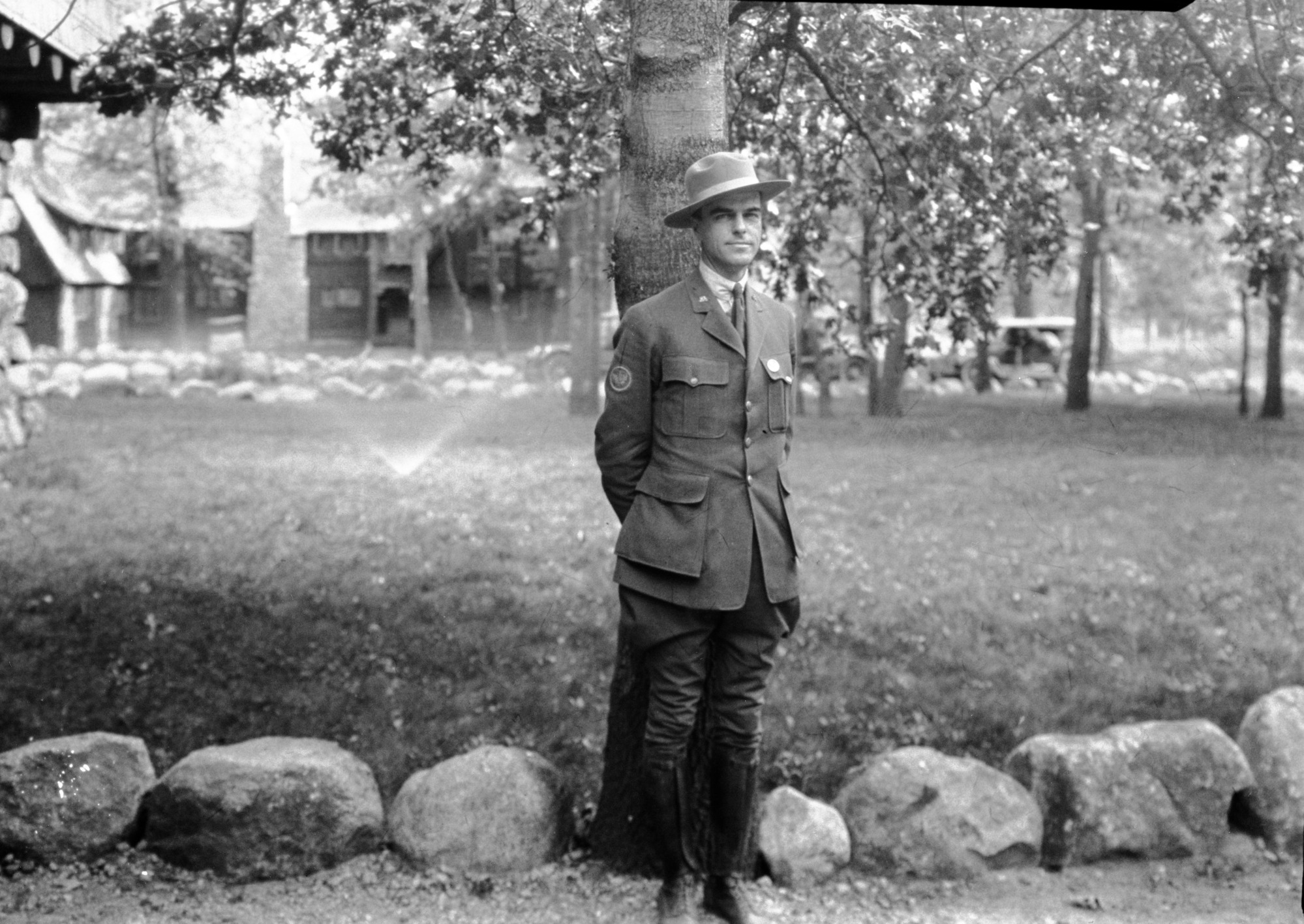
W. B. Lewis circa 1926

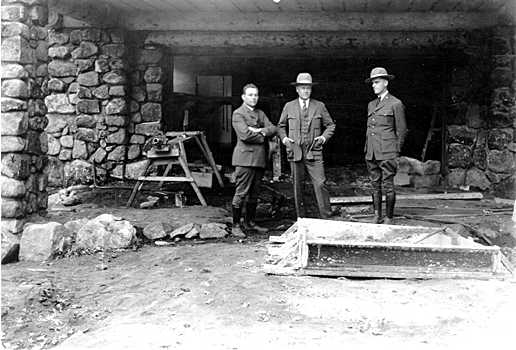
Daniel Hull, Stephen T. Mather, and W. B. Lewis in 1924

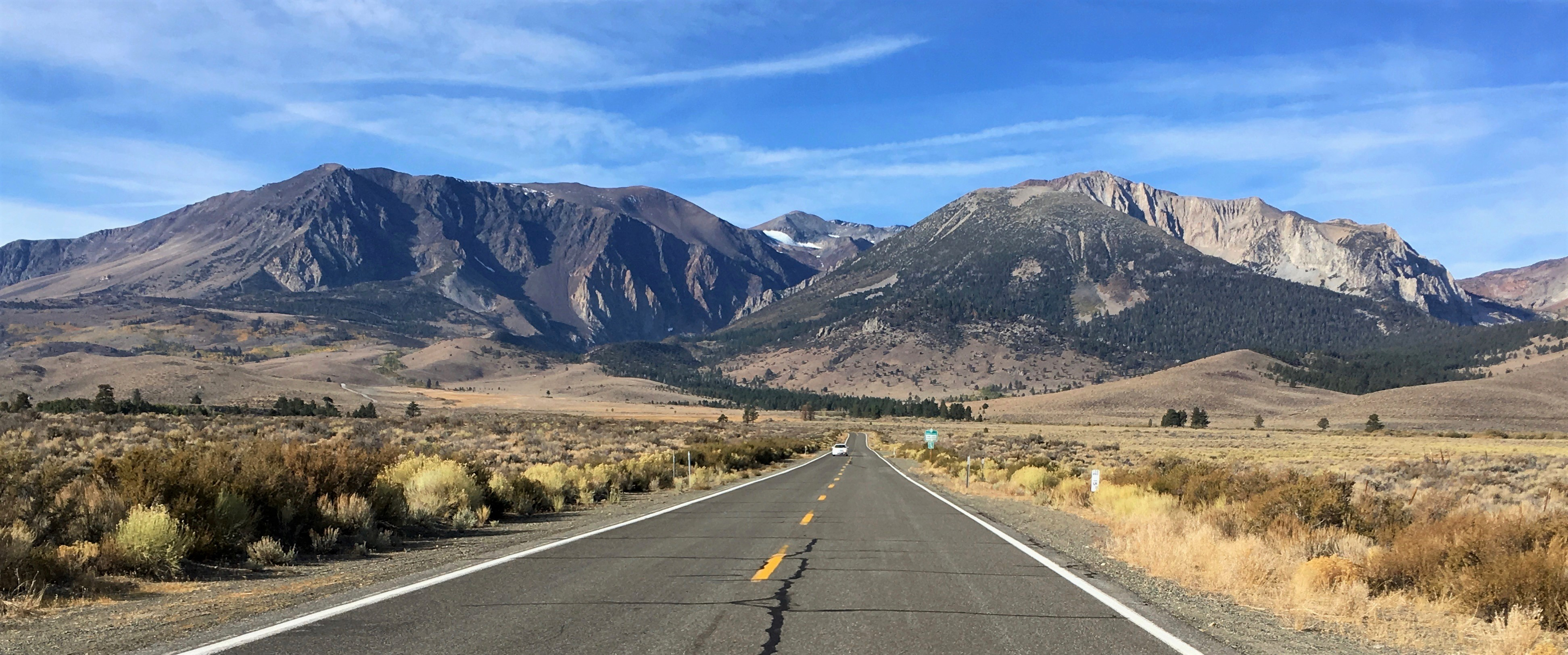
Mt. Lewis (right) seen from Highway 158

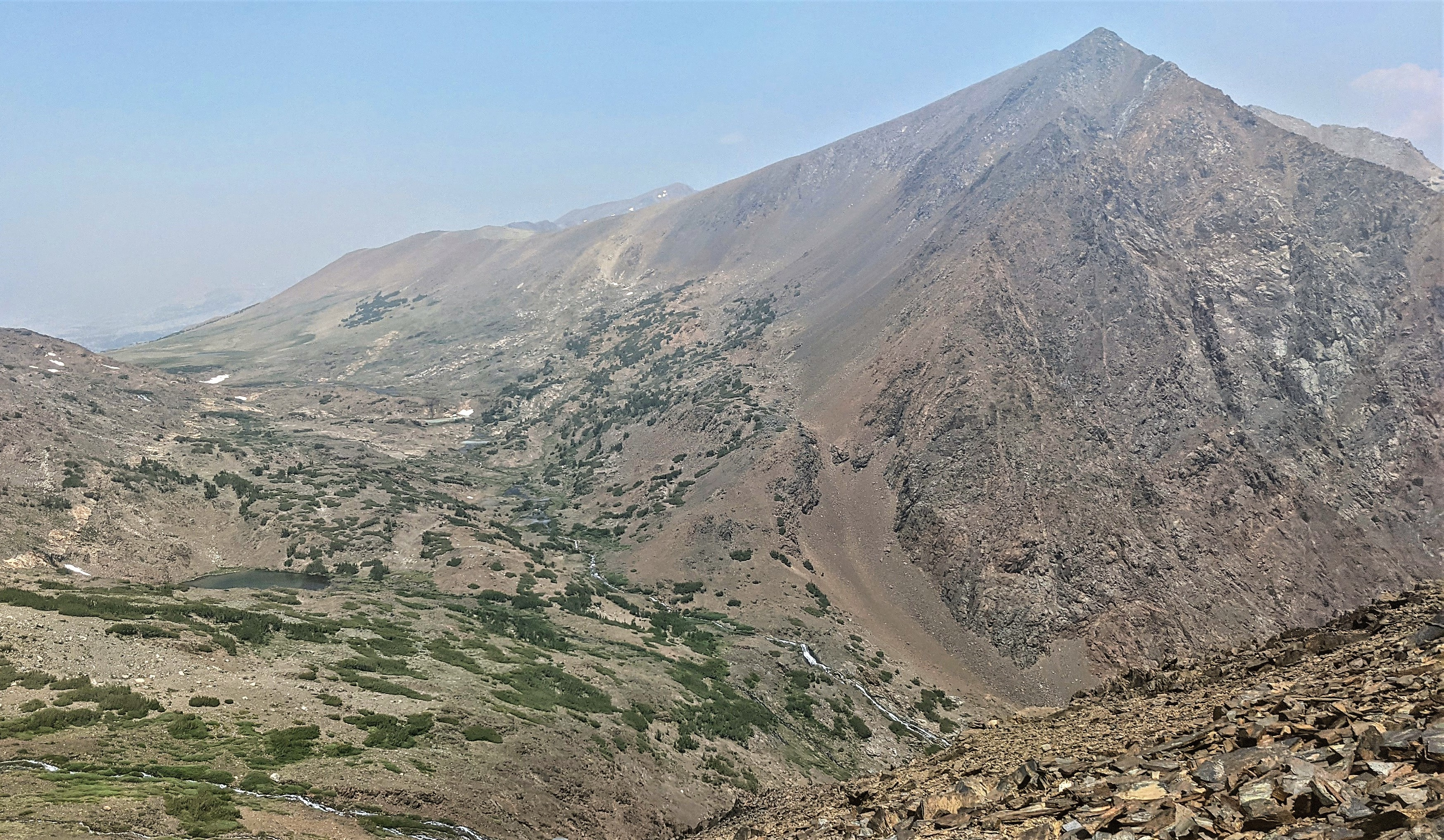
South aspect of Mt. Lewis (right) seen from Koip Peak Pass, (Parker Pass to left).

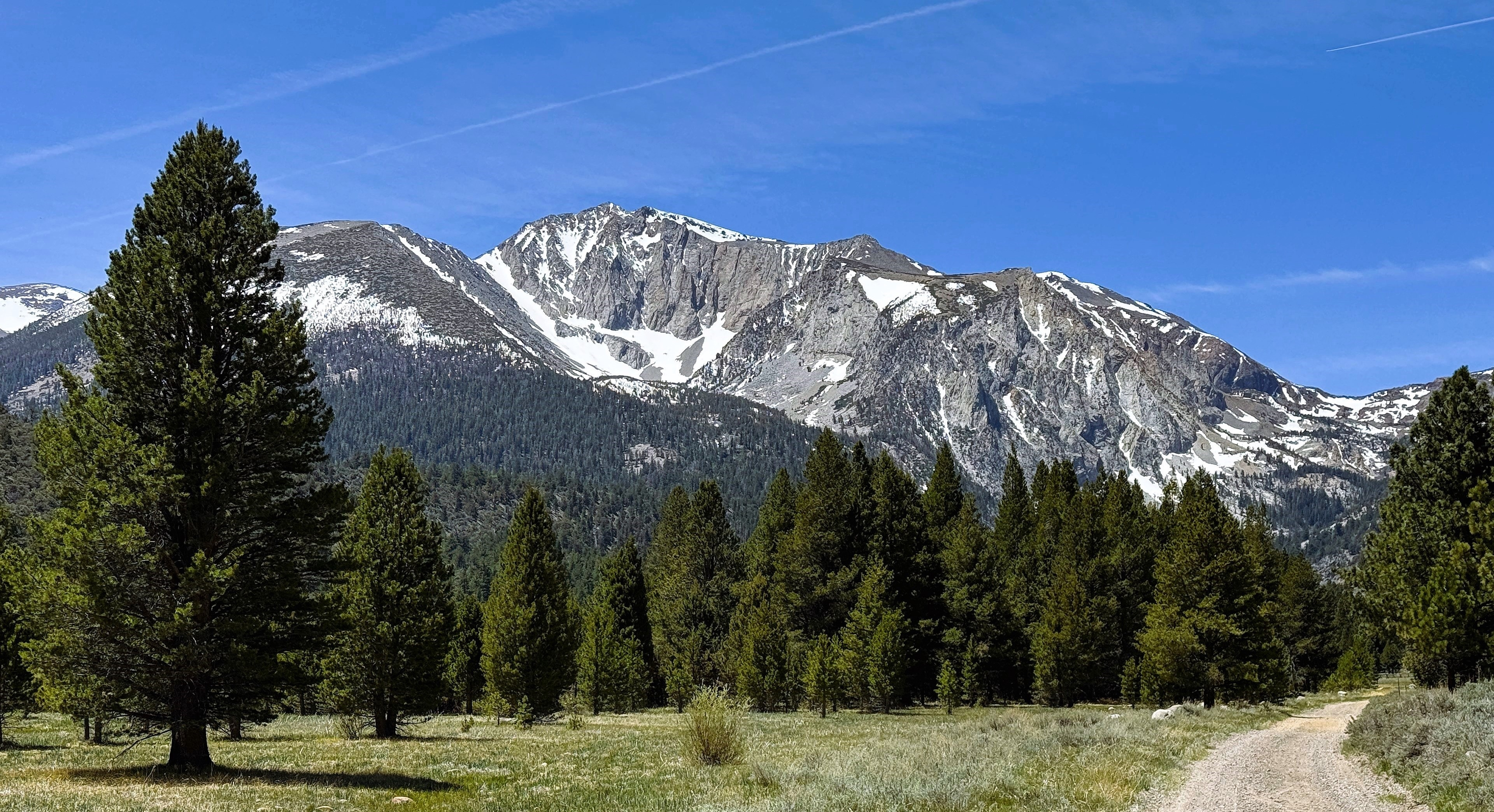
Northeast slope of Mount Lewis

== See also ==
- Geology of the Yosemite area
