= Parker Peak (California) =

Mountain in California, United States

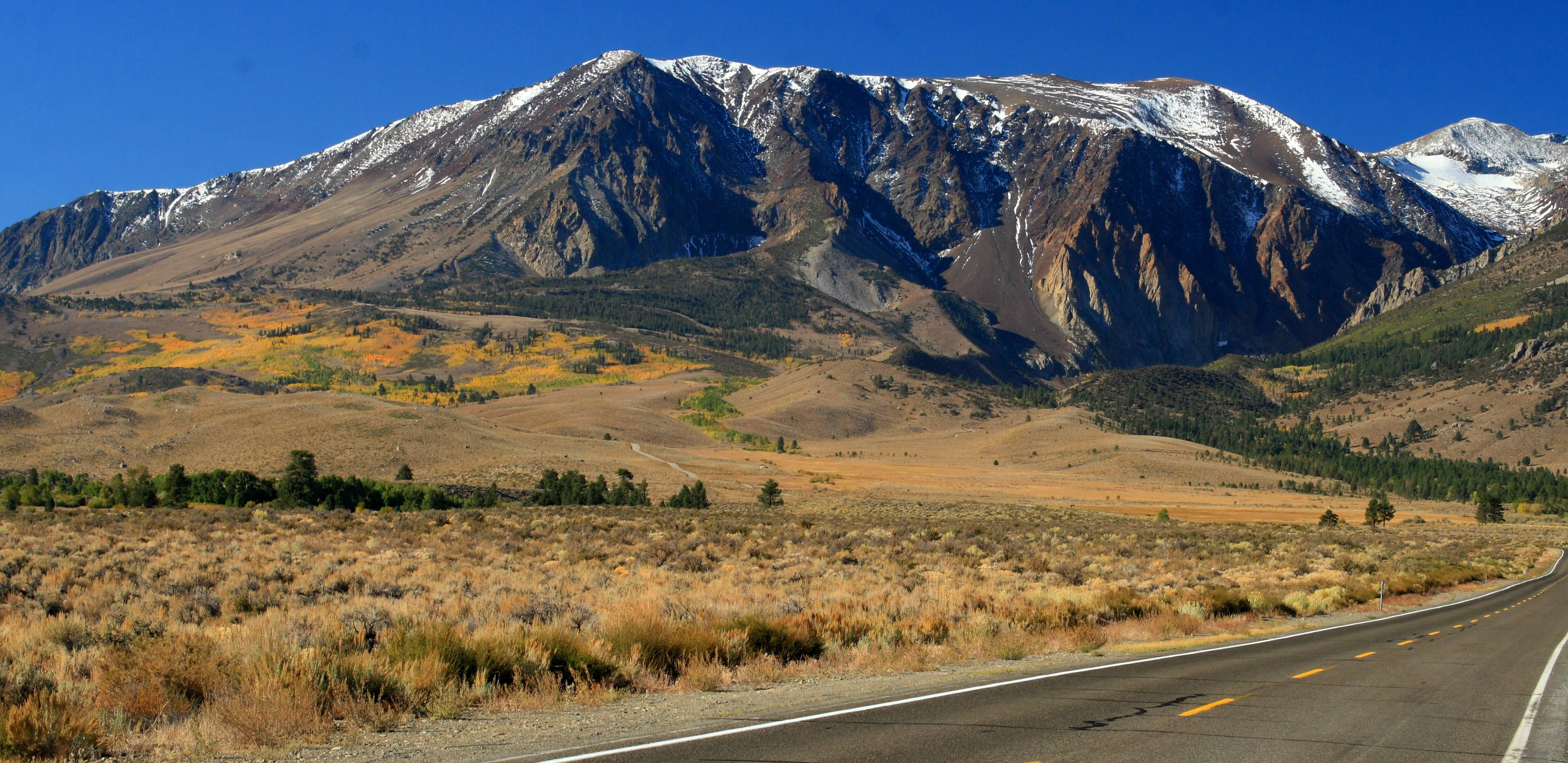
- Northeast aspect from June Lake Loop (summit to right of center)

Highest point
- Elevation: 12,861 ft (3,920 m)
- Prominence: 581 ft (177 m)
- Parent peak: Kuna Peak (13,002 ft)
- Isolation: 1.31 mi (2.11 km)
- Coordinates: 37°48′51″N 119°11′03″W

Geography
- Location within California Location within the United States
- Location: Ansel Adams Wilderness; Mono County, California, U.S.
- Parent range: Sierra Nevada
- Topo map: USGS Koip Peak

Geology
- Rock age: Cretaceous
- Mountain type: Fault block
- Rock type: Metamorphic rock

Climbing
- First ascent: 1914
- Easiest route: class 2

Parker Peak is a 12,861-foot-elevation (3,920-meter) mountain summit located in the Sierra Nevada mountain range, in Mono County of northern California, United States. It is situated in the Ansel Adams Wilderness, on land managed by Inyo National Forest. It is approximately 7.0 miles (11.3 km) northwest of the community of June Lake, 1.2 miles (1.9 km) east of Yosemite National Park's eastern boundary, and 1.0 mile (1.6 km) east of Koip Peak, the nearest higher neighbor. The mountain is visible from the June Lake Loop, and from the nearby June Mountain ski area. Topographic relief is significant as it rises over 5,700 feet (1,700 meters) above Grant Lake in four miles. This geographical feature's name has been officially adopted by the U.S. Board on Geographic Names. The first ascent of the summit was made in 1914 by Norman Clyde.

== Climate ==
According to the Köppen climate classification system, Parker Peak has an alpine climate. Most weather fronts originate in the Pacific Ocean, and travel east toward the Sierra Nevada mountains. As fronts approach, they are forced upward by the peaks, causing them to drop their moisture in the form of rain or snowfall onto the range (orographic lift). Precipitation runoff from this mountain drains into headwaters of Parker and Alger Creeks, both of which are tributaries of Rush Creek.

== Gallery ==
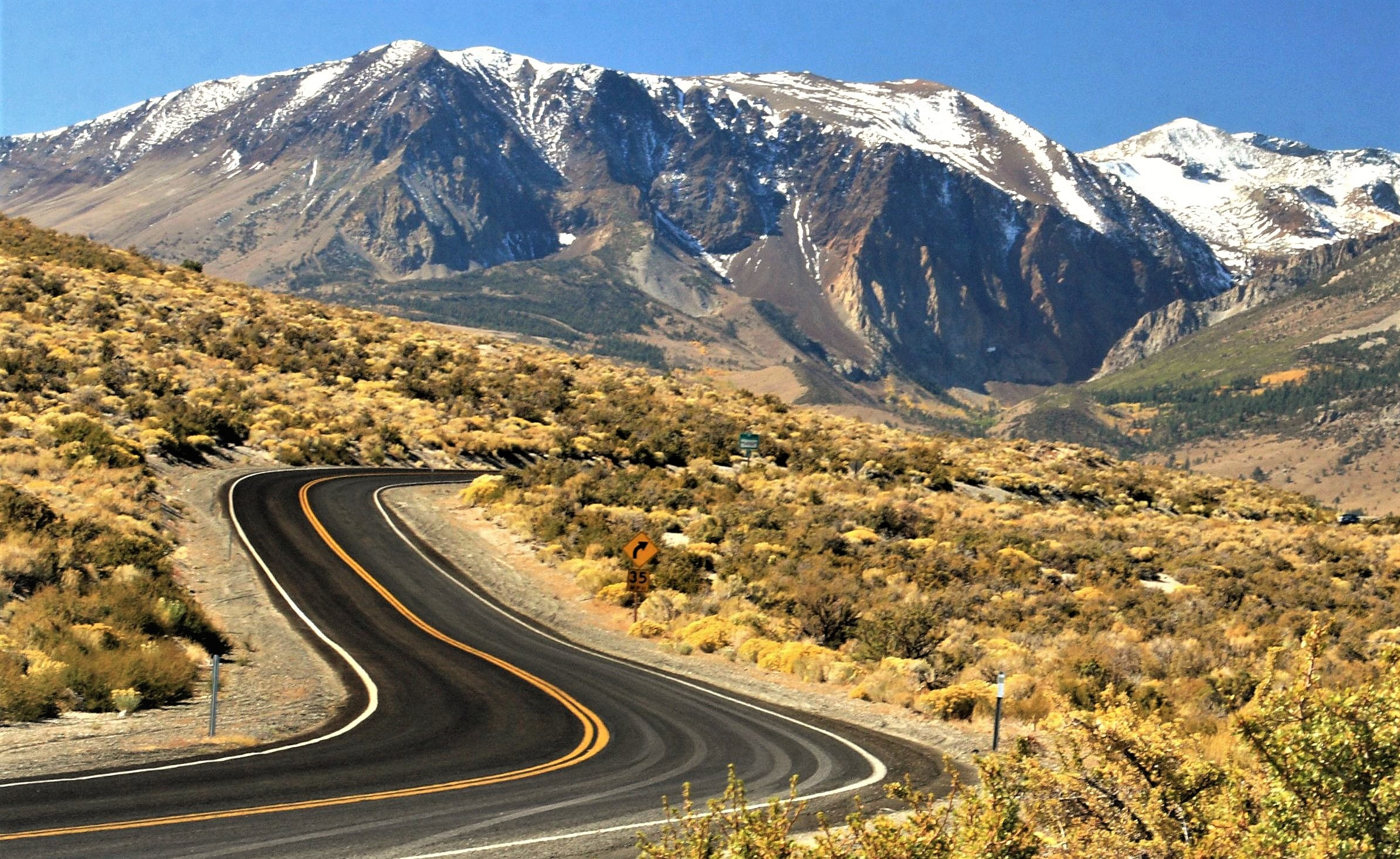
Parker Peak, with Koip Peak in upper right corner

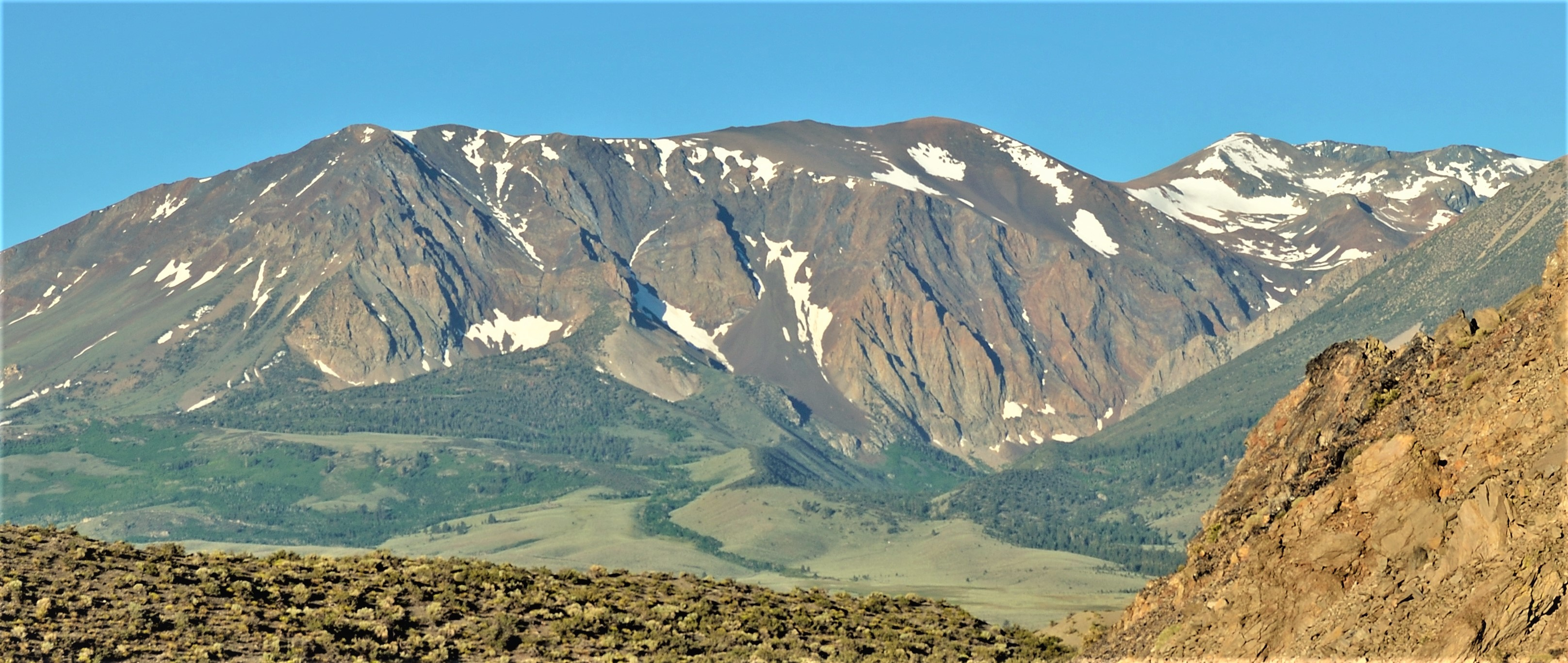
Mount Wood and Parker Peak seen from Panum Crater

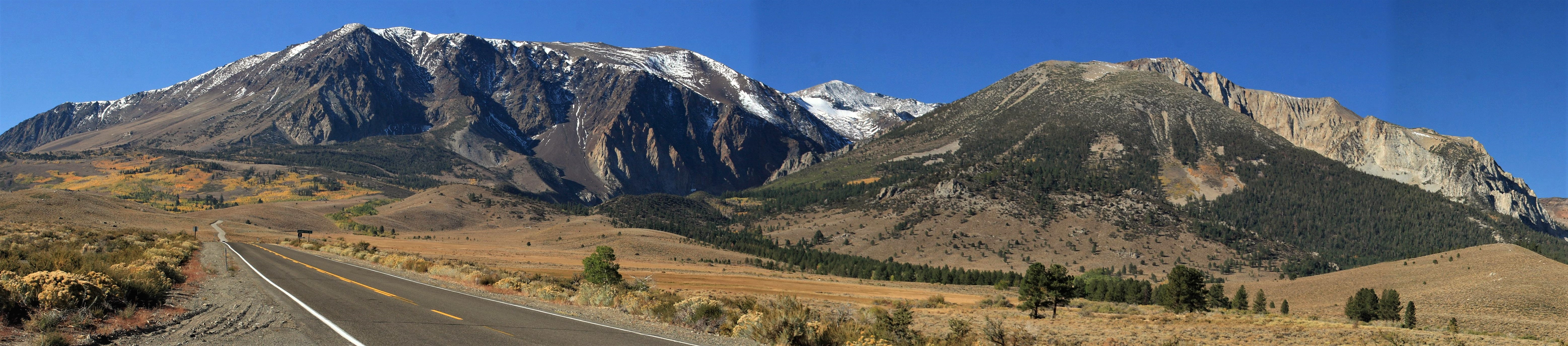
Parker Peak, Koip Peak, and Mount Lewis

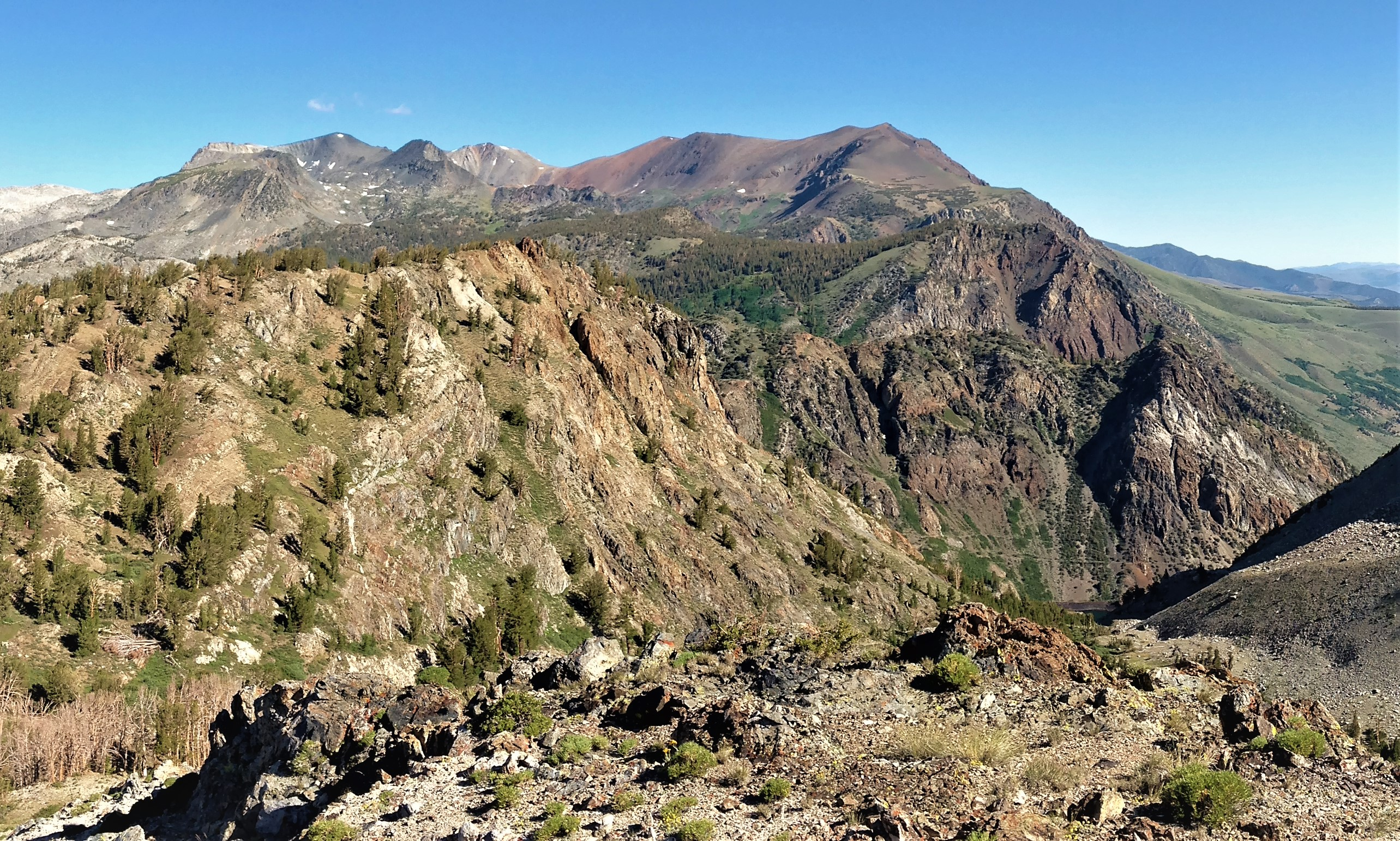
Parker Peak seen from Rush Creek Trail near Spooky Meadow on Carson Peak. Parker is the reddish peak centered in the distance.

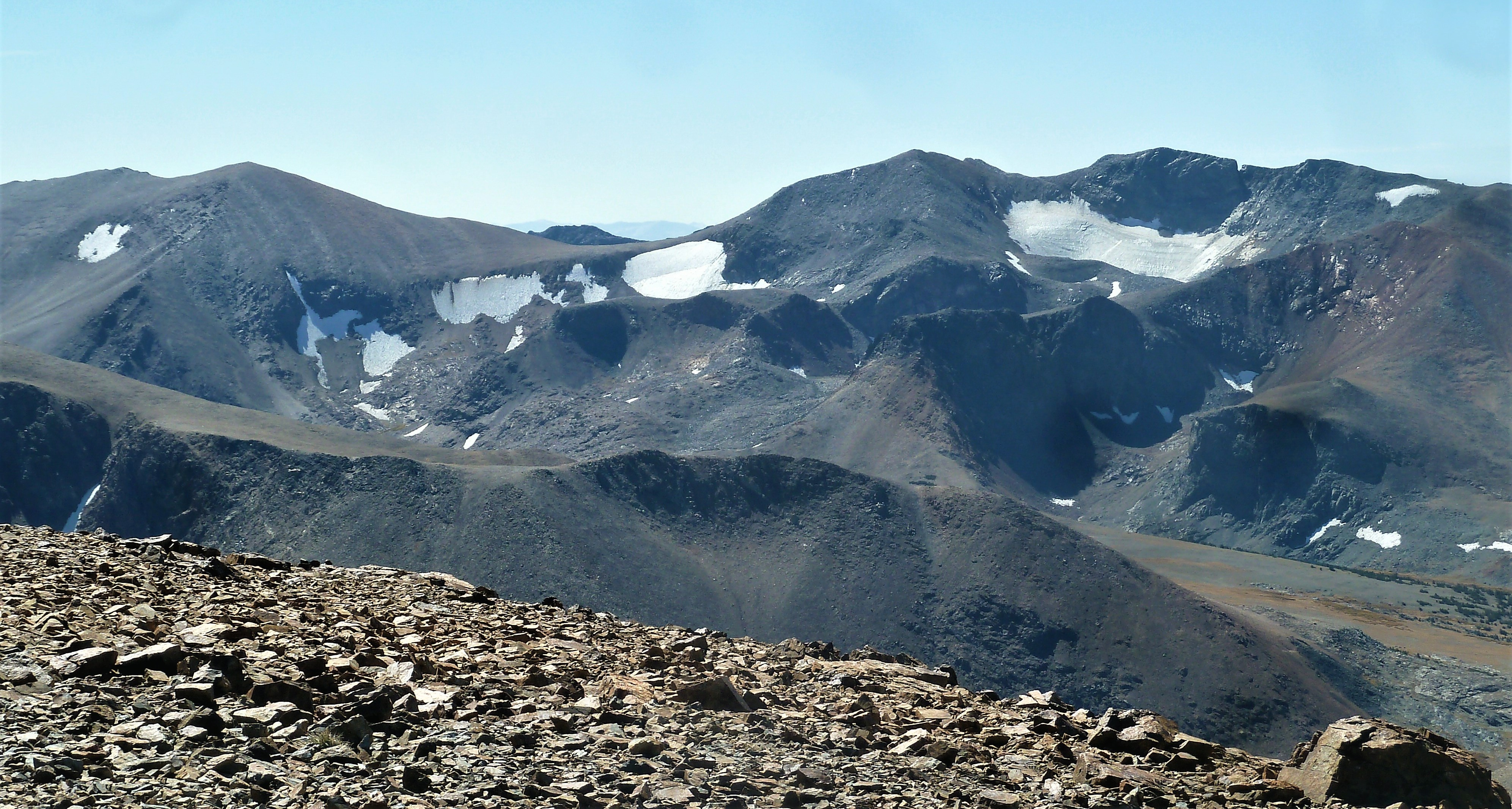
North aspects of Parker Peak (left), Koip Peak (right of center), and Kuna Peak (right) as seen from Mount Gibbs.

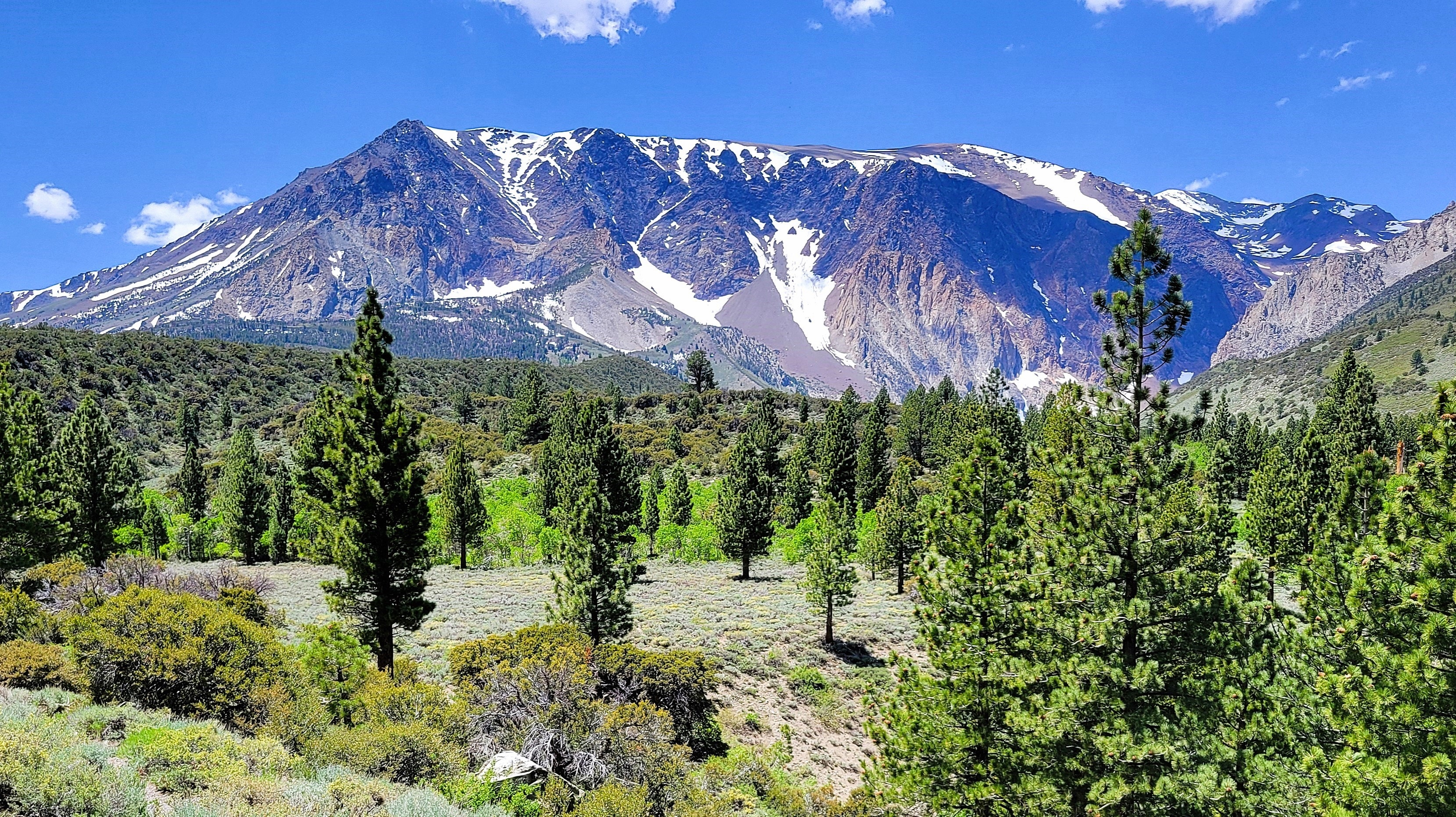
Mount Wood and Parker Peak

== See also ==
- Geology of the Yosemite area
- Mount Wood
