= Koip Peak =

Mountain in the American state of California

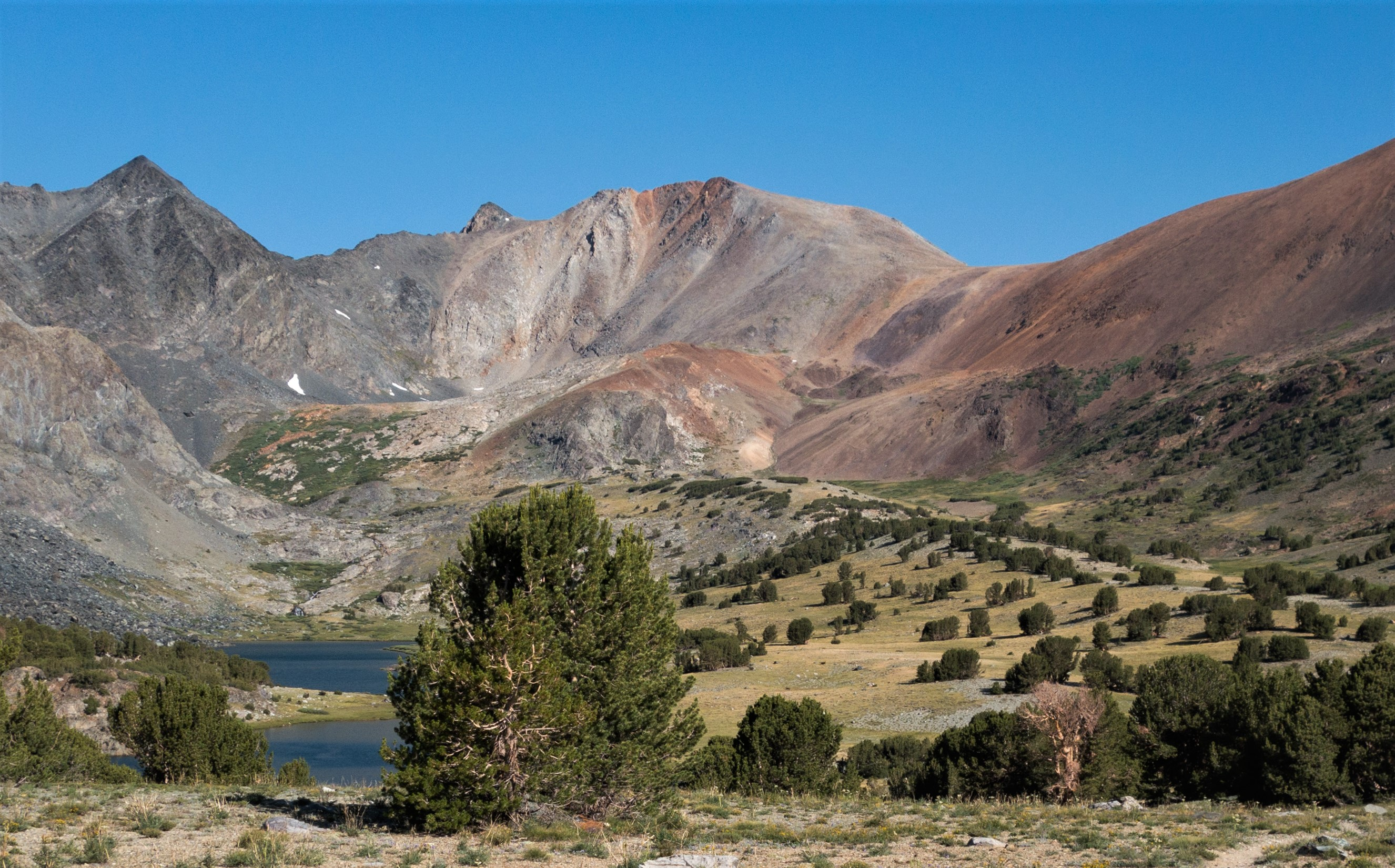
- Southeast aspect

Highest point
- Elevation: 12,968 ft (3,953 m) NAVD 88
- Prominence: 162 ft (49 m)
- Listing: Sierra Peaks Section
- Coordinates: 37°48′49″N 119°12′06″W

Geography
- Location within California Location within the United States
- Location: Mono County, California, U.S.
- Parent range: Ritter Range, Sierra Nevada
- Topo map: USGS Koip Peak

Climbing
- First ascent: 1919 by Walker Huber
- Easiest route: Hike from Koip Peak Pass, class 1

Koip Peak is a 12,968-foot-elevation (3,953-meter) summit in Mono County, California, in the United States. It is located in the Ansel Adams Wilderness, on land managed by Inyo National Forest. It is approximately 0.25 miles (0.40 km) outside of Yosemite National Park's eastern boundary, and 1.0 mile (1.6 km) west of Parker Peak.

Koip is derived from a Western Numic name meaning "mountain sheep". Bighorn sheep roam in the area.

== Climate ==
According to the Köppen climate classification system, Koip Peak is located in an alpine climate zone. Most weather fronts originate in the Pacific Ocean, and travel east toward the Sierra Nevada mountains. As fronts approach, they are forced upward by the peaks (orographic lift), causing them to drop their moisture in the form of rain or snowfall onto the range.

== Gallery ==
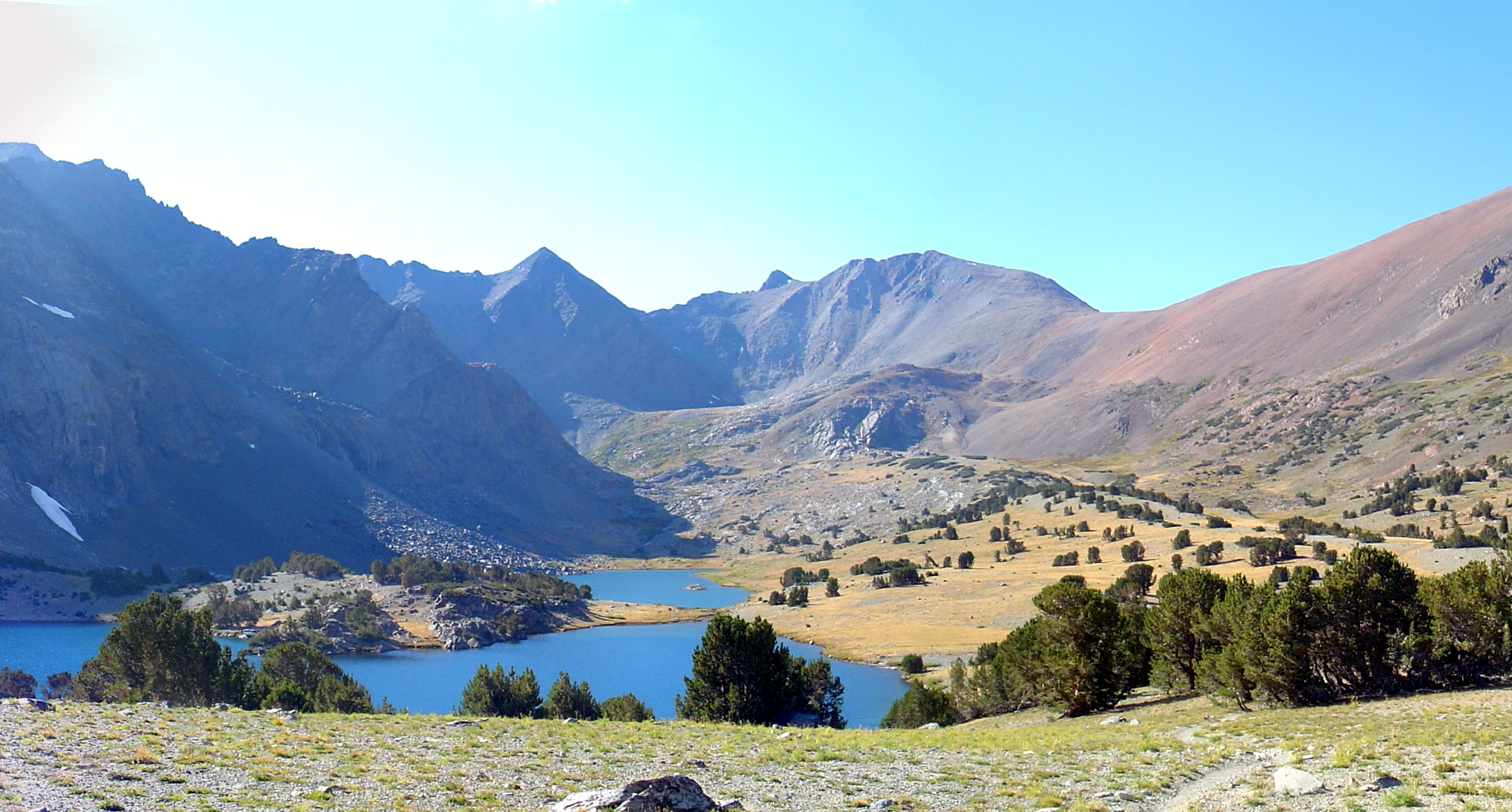
Koip Peak to the right of center

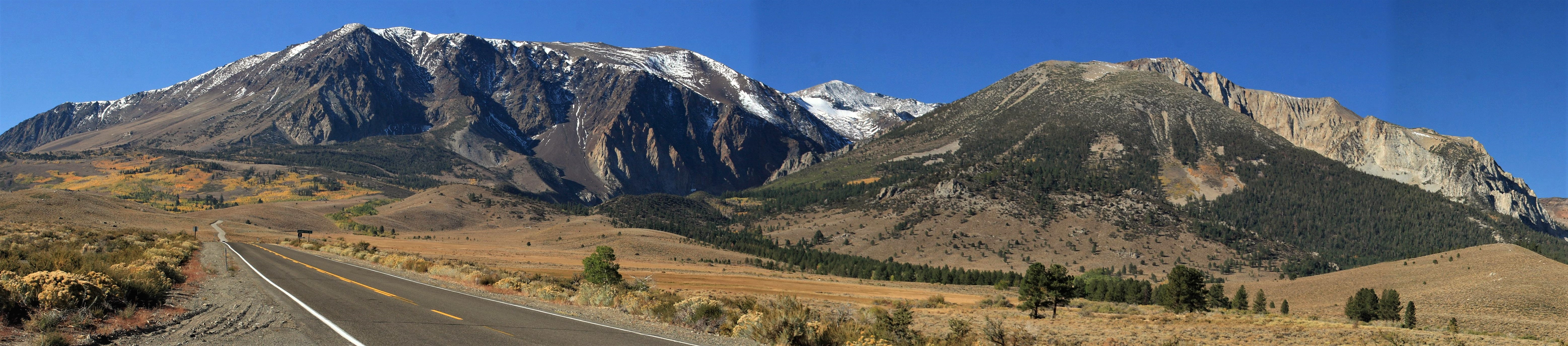
Snow-covered Koip Peak centered in back, flanked by Parker Peak (left) and Mount Lewis (right)

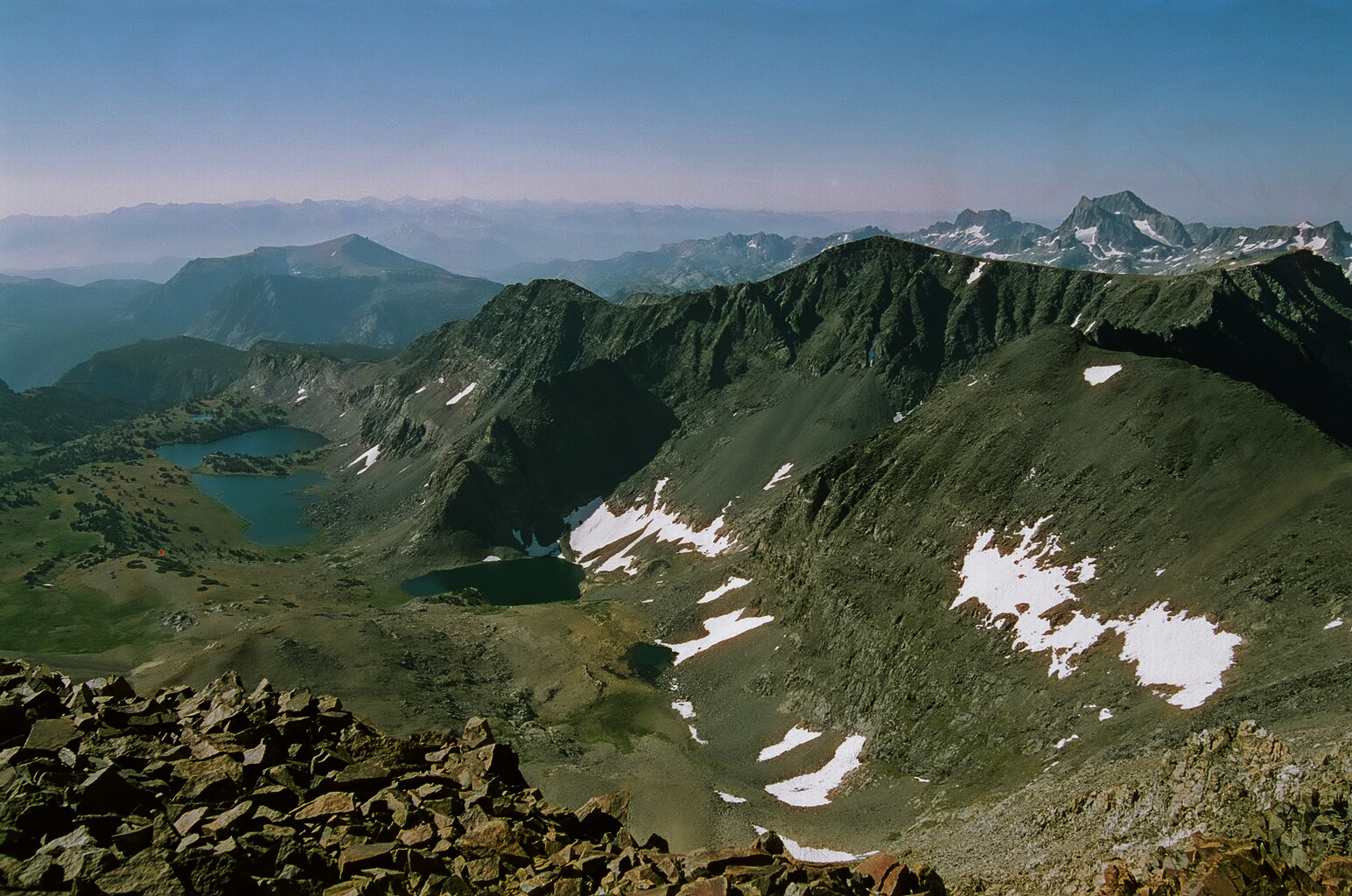
View from Koip Peak: Alger Lakes, Blacktop Peak, and distant Ritter Range

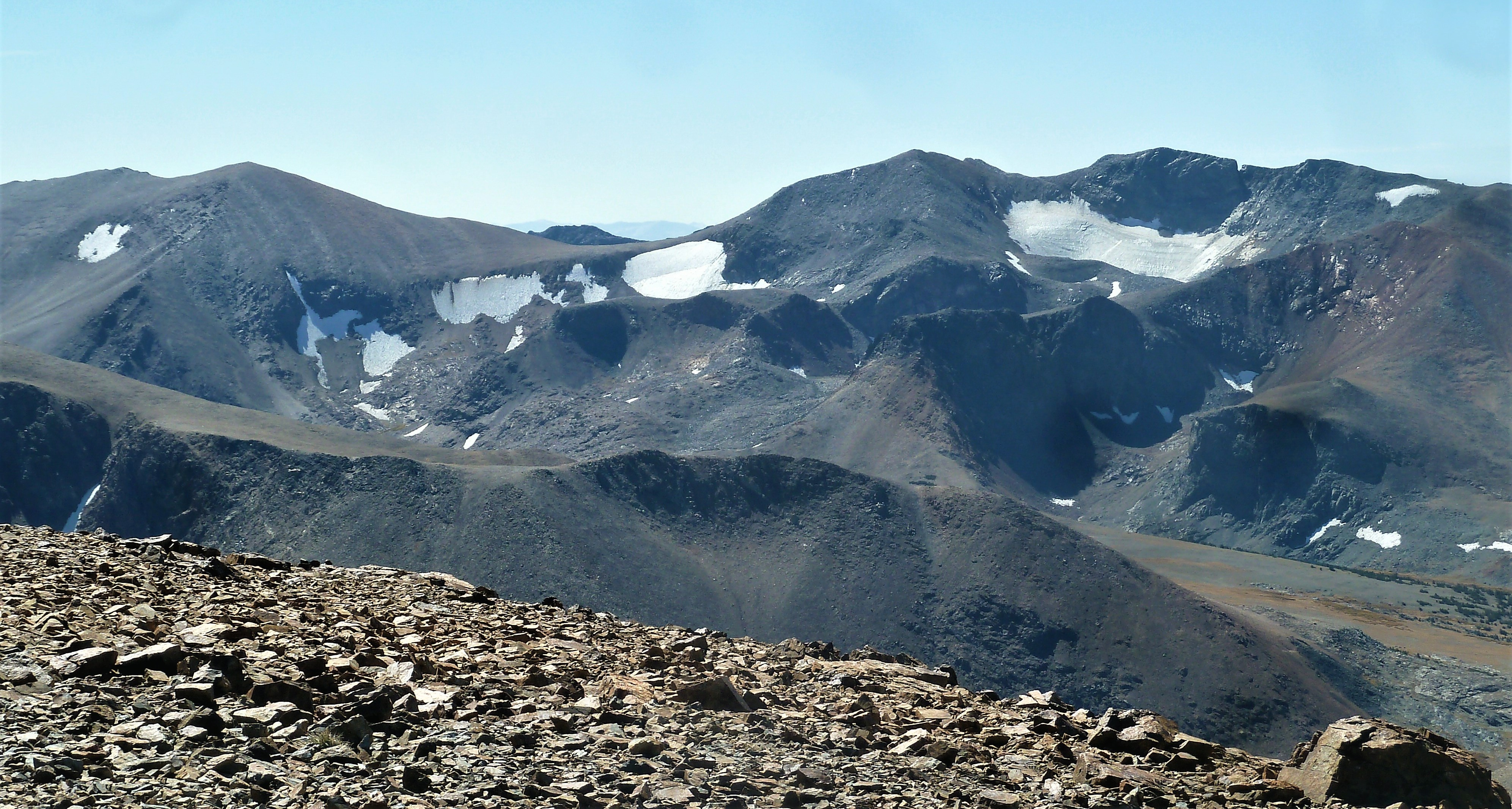
North aspects of Parker Peak (left), Koip Peak (right of center), and Kuna Peak (right) as seen from Mount Gibbs.
