= Johnson Granite Porphyry =

Granite porphyry in Yosemite National Park

- Stratigraphic range: 85.4 Ma
- Type: Geological formation
- Area: 1,100 square kilometres (420 sq mi)

Location
- Location: Yosemite National Park
- Country: United States of America

Type section
- Named for: Johnson Peak
- Location: Yosemite National Park

Johnson Granite Porphyry is found in Tuolumne Meadows, Yosemite National Park.

Johnson Granite Porphyry was named for Johnson Peak, the highest mountain in Tuolumne Meadows, Yosemite National Park.

Its area is estimated at 1,100 square kilometres (420 sq mi), the exposed area covering roughly 40 square kilometres (15 sq mi). Johnson Granite Porphyry is part of the Tuolumne Batholith. Its boundaries are difficult to trace, and are irregular. It is both the youngest, and the most siliceous rock of Tuolumne Intrusive Suite.

== Geology ==
The innermost, most felsic part of the Tuolumne Batholith is the Johnson Granite Porphyry. It is a highly irregular, elongated body. Completely surrounding it is the much larger body of Cathedral Peak granite.

Field observations and magnetic fabrics suggest an extrusive event, that is, Johnson Granite Porphyry may record possible volcanism. This may relate to deformation along active shear zones.

Johnson Granite Porphyry is composed of

- quartz
- K-feldspar
- zoned plagioclase, and
- locally contains coarse-grained feldspars
- Biotite, the only mafic mineral, with accessory phases of;
  - sphene,
  - allanite,
  - apatite,
  - magnetite.

== See also ==
- Cathedral Peak Granodiorite
- El Capitan Granite
- Fine Gold Intrusive Suite
- Geology of the Yosemite area
- Intrusive Suite of Buena Vista Crest
- Intrusive Suite of Merced Peak
- Intrusive Suite of Sonora Pass
- Kuna Crest Granodiorite
- Porphyry
- Sentinel granodiorite
- Tuolumne Intrusive Suite

== External links and references ==
- Reference with a photo
- Geologic and geophysical investigation of two fine-grained granites, Sierra Nevada Batholith, California: Evidence for structural controls on emplacement and volcanism
- National Geologic Map Database site
