= Intrusive Suite of Merced Peak =

Geological formation in Yosemite National Park, USA

- Stratigraphic range: mid-Cretaceous, 100.5–93.9 Ma
- Type: Suite

Lithology
- Primary: Granodiorite

Location
- Region: Yosemite National Park
- Country: United States

Type section
- Named for: Merced Peak
- The Intrusive Suite of Merced Peak, near Merced Peak, lower right

The Intrusive Suite of Merced Peak is one of several intrusive suites in Yosemite National Park. These also include:

1. Fine Gold Intrusive Suite
2. Intrusive Suite of Buena Vista Crest
3. Intrusive Suite of Jack Main Canyon
4. Intrusive Suite of Sonora Pass
5. Intrusive Suite of Yosemite Valley
6. Johnson Granite Porphyry
7. Tuolumne Intrusive Suite

== Geology ==
The Intrusive Suite of Merced Peak dates to roughly 98 Ma. The formation dates to mid-Cretaceous. It lies within the volcanogenic Minarets sequence, and comprises the granodiorite of Jackass Lakes and the leucogranites of Timber Knob and Norris Creek. Most of the suite is the former.

== See also ==
- Merced Peak
