= Intrusive Suite of Sonora Pass =

Geological formation in Yosemite National Park, USA

- Stratigraphic range: Late Cretaceous, 92–89 Ma
- Type: Suite

Location
- Region: Yosemite National Park
- Country: United States

Type section
- Named for: Sonora Pass
- The Intrusive Suite of Sonora Pass is visible, in light red

The Intrusive Suite of Sonora Pass (also, the Sonora Pass Intrusive Suite) is one of several intrusive suites in Yosemite National Park. These also include

1. Fine Gold Intrusive Suite
2. Intrusive Suite of Buena Vista Crest
3. Intrusive Suite of Jack Main Canyon
4. Intrusive Suite of Merced Peak
5. Intrusive Suite of Yosemite Valley
6. Tuolumne Intrusive Suite

The Intrusive Suite of Sonora Pass is ~92-89 Ma, and is the northernmost of four large Late Cretaceous zoned intrusive suites in the central Sierra Nevada batholith.

== Rock types ==
On a large scale, it is composed of Kinney Lakes granodiorite and the younger Topaz Lake granodiorite.

On a finer scale, the Intrusive Suite of Sonora Pass is made of light-gray, coarse-grained biotite granodiorite, plus granite with roughly equant, well-formed potassium feldspar phenocrysts composing about 2–10% of the rock. Quartz usually occurs in clots of 0.5 centimetres (0.20 in). The mafic mineral content is about 10%.
