= Big Pine volcanic field =

Volcanic field in Inyo County, California

- Aberdeen volcanic field
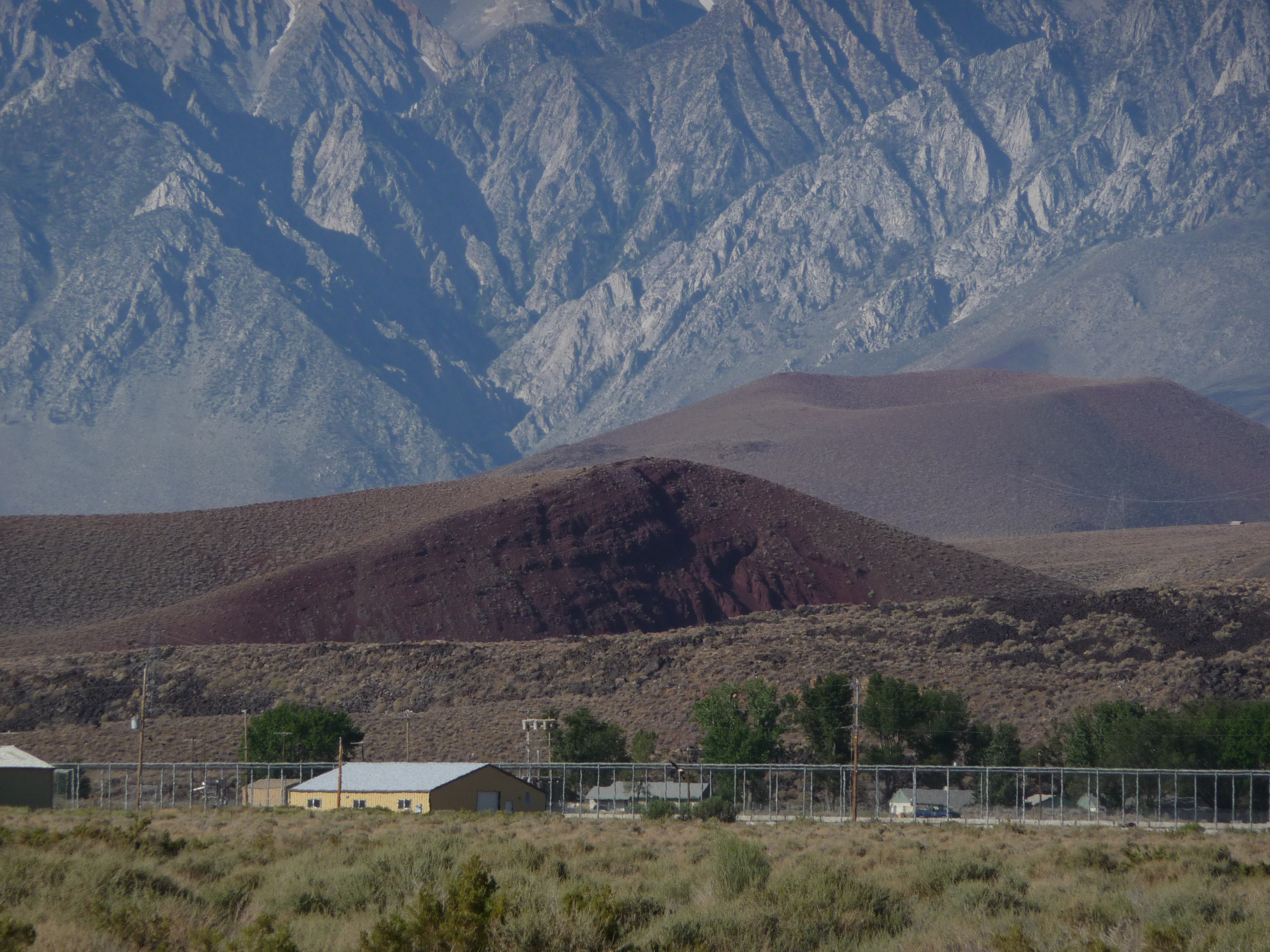
- Cinder cones at Fish Springs, CA

Highest point
- Coordinates: 37°00′N 118°15′W

Geography
- Location within California

Geology
- Rock age: Pleistocene
- Mountain type: Volcanic field
- Last eruption: 17,000 years ago.

Big Pine volcanic field is a volcanic field in Inyo County, California. The volcanic field covers a surface area of 500 square kilometres (190 sq mi) within the Owens Valley east of the Sierra Nevada and consists of lava flows, one rhyolitic coulee and about 40 volcanic vents including cinder cones. Some vents are simple conical cinder cones while others are irregular scoria cones. Glaciers and former lakes have modified lava flows.

Volcanic activity in the field commenced 1.2 million years ago and was controlled by a number of faults which cross the valley. Activity continued into the Pleistocene with the youngest eruption generating cones and several lava flows about 17,000 years ago. A major road and the Los Angeles Aqueduct would be threatened if volcanic activity restarted at Big Pine.

== Geography and geomorphology ==
The Big Pine volcanic field (also known as Aberdeen volcanic field) lies in the Owens Valley, around Aberdeen, California and between the towns of Big Pine and Independence. U.S. Route 395 and the Owens River run through the field, the latter is dammed north of the field in the Tinemaha Reservoir.

The field covers c. 500 square kilometres (190 sq mi) and consists of 25 monogenetic volcanoes and about 15 further vents. The field features volcanic cones on both sides of the valley, which take the form of symmetrical cones and irregular vents; the latter are found at the valley margin while the former are located on the valley floor. Crater Mountain and Red Mountain are two cones in the field. Pyroclastic material is usually found only close to the vents. A single rhyolite coulee is also part of the field.

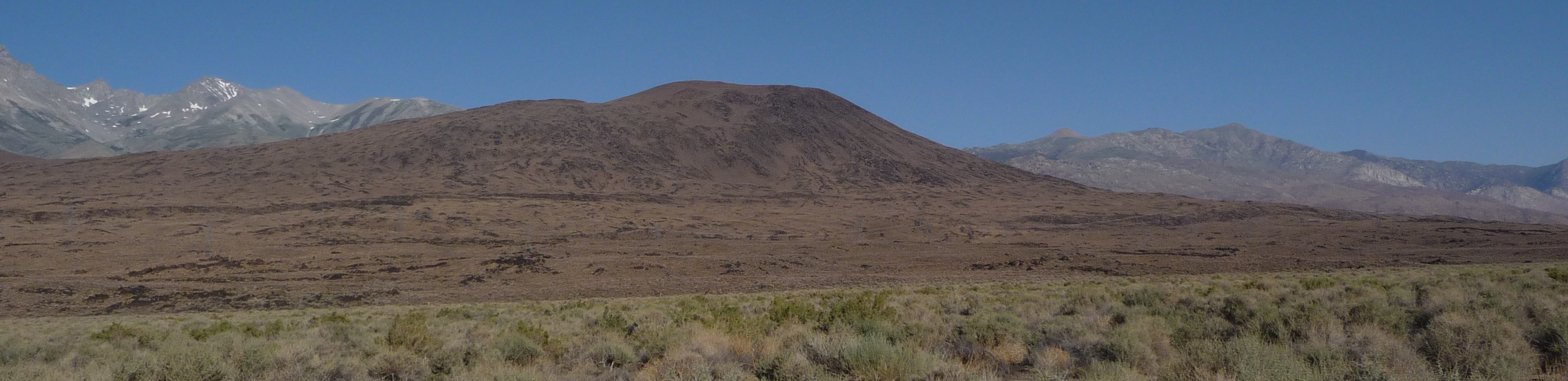
Lava flows and Crater Mountain from Fish Springs Road

Around Aberdeen, lava flows from diverse vents form a large field with aa and pahoehoe forms and neatly preserved surface features. Lava flows reach lengths of 9 kilometres (5.6 mi) and have thicknesses of 0.01–30 metres (0.39 in – 98 ft 5.10 in) and sometimes lava flows from separate cones overlap, such as in Papoose Canyon.

In the past, pluvial lakes and glaciers extended over the Owens Valley. Volcanic activity occurred at the Big Pine volcanic field during that time and was influenced by these lakes and glaciers. Owens Lake spread through much of the valley during glacial times and cut shorelines into the lava flows. Glacial material and sediment covers some lava flows, and deep wells have found buried lava flows at depths of 250 metres (820 ft).

The basement in the region is formed by plutonic rocks of Mesozoic age, metasedimentary and metavolcanic rocks which crop out in the White Mountains and the Sierra Nevada; the valley floor is covered with alluvium. Tectonically, Owens Valley is a graben formed by the movement of the Sierra Nevada-Great Valley block with respect to the rest of North America. Farther south lies the Coso volcanic field, which is also geothermally active unlike Big Pine volcanic field.

=== Geologic context ===
Various processes have been proposed to explain the volcanism in the Basin and Range province. These include tectonic spreading which triggered the upwelling of mantle material, convection within the mantle owing to temperature and viscosity differences, the aftereffects of Proterozoic crustal boundaries, mantle currents and release of water by the slab of the Farallon Plate and the delamination of crustal material. There are a number of volcanic fields in Eastern California and Big Pine is one of these.

Volcanic activity at Big Pine and Coso volcanic fields is linked to the tectonic spreading of the Basin and Range province, and vents at Big Pine are associated with faults such as the Owens Valley fault, the Sierra Nevada fault and the White Mountains fault; faults have offset lava flows of the field. Seismic imaging of the crust beneath the Big Pine volcanic field indicates that the lithosphere is thinner there than elsewhere.

=== Composition ===
The Big Pine volcanic field has erupted basaltic rocks spanning a range of composition from alkali basalt to basanite, as well as one unit of silicic rocks. Phenocrysts include olivine, plagioclase and clinopyroxene. The erupted rocks also contain xenoliths such as lherzolite, pyroxenite and wehrlite.

The magmas erupted in the Big Pine volcanic field were generated by melting of lithospheric mantle that had been modified by subduction processes 1.8 billion years ago. Research conducted in 2008 suggested that the mixing and melting of two origin magmas is necessary to generate the observed rock compositions. After formation, the magmas at Big Pine quickly rose to the surface, preventing the formation of rhyolites which would require the magmas to stall within the crust.

== Climate and vegetation ==
Owens Valley is windy and sunny with yearly temperatures fluctuating 42 – −19 °C (107 – −2 °F) with strong diurnal temperature fluctuations. The Owens Valley lies in the rainshadow of the Sierra Nevada and thus the climate of the valley is dry with about 130 millimetres per year (5 in/year) precipitation.

Vegetation in the valley is dominated by species adapted to arid and semiarid climates and includes Alkali sacaton, big sagebrush, greasewood, Nevada saltbush, rubber rabbitbrush, salt grass and shadscale. Plants cluster in places where water is available, such as on former stream courses, around depressions and along fault lines.

== Eruption history ==
Volcanism at Big Pine occurred during the Quaternary and yielded a total volume of 0.5 cubic kilometres (0.12 cu mi) of rock. Activity lasted from 1.2 million years ago until 17,000 years ago, with the bulk of the rocks erupted between 500,000 and 100,000 years ago. Glacial isostasy seems to influence eruption rates in the field, with eruptions suppressed during glacial times.

The oldest volcanic structures, 1.2 million years old, are found in the Oak Creek area and only erosional remnants of them are encountered. The rhyolite was erupted about 990,000 years ago, while later volcanism took place from 760,800 ± 22,800 years ago in Papoose Canyon (Papoose Canyon sequence) over 469,400 ± 9,200 years ago at Jalopy Cone, 90,500 ± 17,600 years ago at Quarry Cone, 61,600 ± 23,400 years ago at Volcanic Bomb Cone, 31,800 ± 12,100 years ago at Goodale Bee Cone (Aberdeen flow), 27,000 years ago at the Blackrock Springs lava to the about 17,000 years old Armstrong Canyon/Division Creek/Taboose Creek flows.

These (Armstrong Canyon/Division Creek/Taboose Creek) flows were erupted during the same episode, which created Armstrong Canyon cone, a series of scoria cones and the three lava flows along a 6 kilometres (3.7 mi) long tract of the Sierra Nevada fault. This episode may have generated as much as 0.6 cubic kilometres (0.14 cu mi) of tephra, and lava flows interacted with water forming palagonite. The lavas from this event and the Blackrock Springs lava were later eroded by Owens Lake during the Last Glacial Maximum highstand.

=== Hazards ===
The volcanoes in Eastern California such as Long Valley, Coso and Big Pine are still considered hazardous. The Los Angeles Aqueduct and US. Route 395 may be impacted by future eruptions at Big Pine; the former contributes 250,000,000–620,000,000 cubic metres (200,000–500,000 acre⋅ft) of the water supply of Los Angeles (from less than one quarter to more than half of the city's water consumption) while the latter is frequently used by people travelling between Mammoth Lakes and Los Angeles.

== Gallery ==
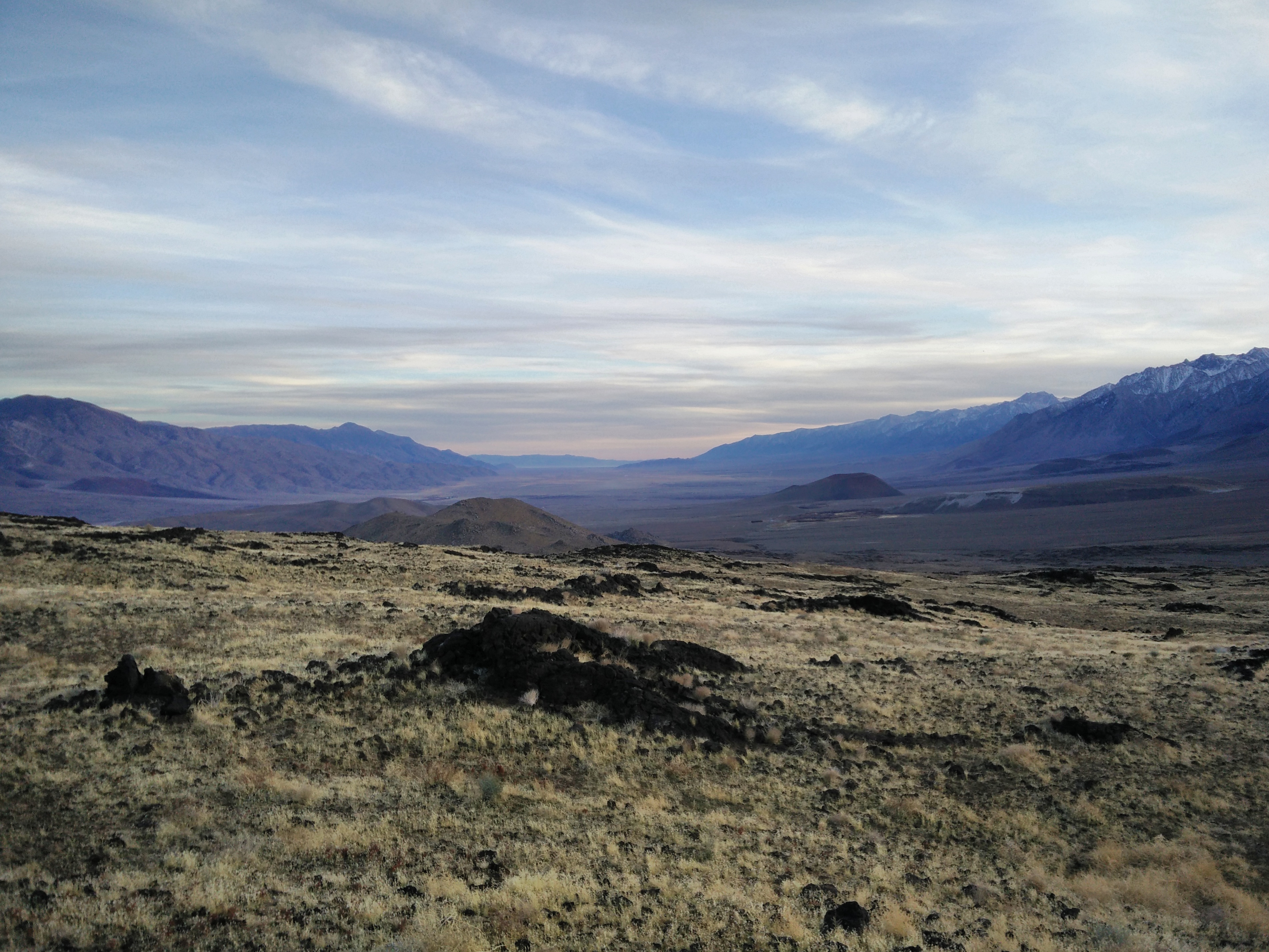
Cinder cones in the background

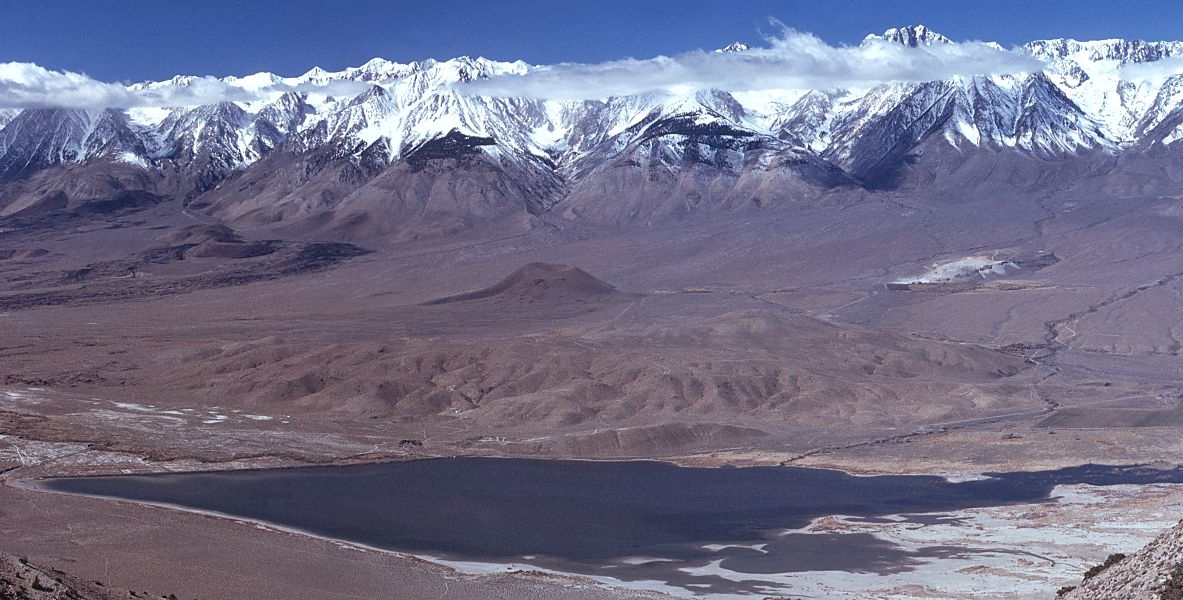
Tinemaha Reservoir, with cinder cones in the middle and left parts of the image

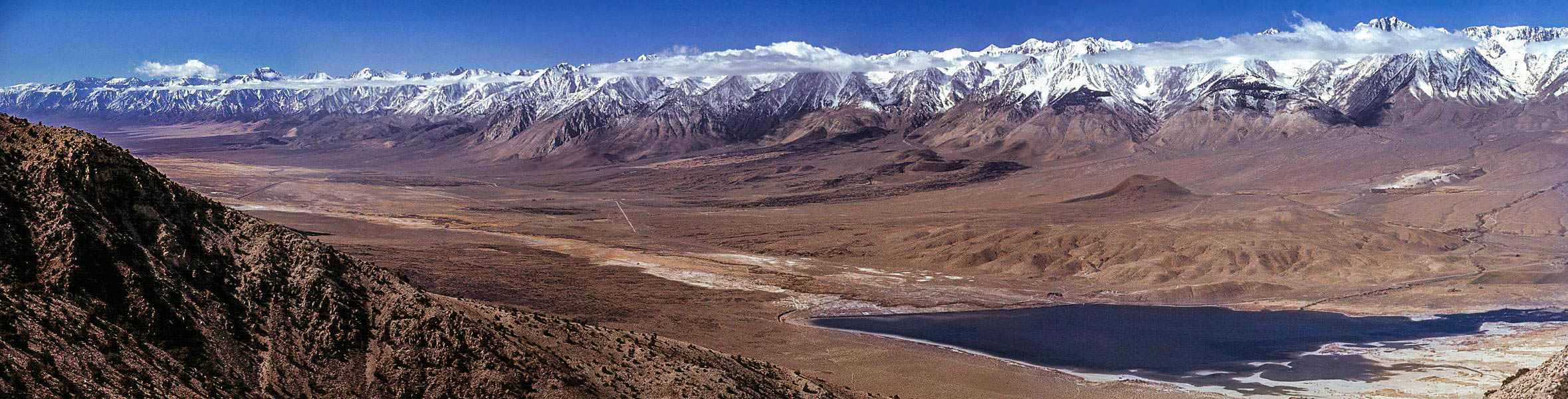
Owens Valley, with cones visible in the centre-right part of the image

== See also ==
- List of volcanic fields
