= Intrusive Suite of Buena Vista Crest =

One of several intrusive suites in Yosemite National Park

The Intrusive Suite of Buena Vista Crest is mostly below the word "Park," in Yosemite National Park, parts elsewhere

The Intrusive Suite of Buena Vista Crest is an intrusive suite which extends 30 kilometres (19 mi) southward, from Yosemite Valley to Yosemite National Park's southeastern boundary, into plutons of the Sierra Nevada Batholith, which are slightly older. These intrusive suites also include

1. Fine Gold Intrusive Suite
2. Intrusive Suite of Jack Main Canyon
3. Intrusive Suite of Merced Peak
4. Intrusive Suite of Sonora Pass
5. Intrusive Suite of Yosemite Valley
6. Tuolumne Intrusive Suite

== The age of the Intrusive Suite of Buena Vista Crest ==
The Intrusive Suite of Buena Vista Crest came to be roughly 100 to 90 Ma. It is roughly the same age as the Washburn Lake Intrusive Suite and the Merced Peak Intrusive Suite, both of which are to the east of the Intrusive Suite of Buena Vista Crest.

== External links and references ==
- HOW DEEP WAS THE INTRUSIVE SUITE OF BUENA VISTA CREST? CONTRASTING RESULTS FROM HORNBLENDE-PLAGIOCLASE THERMOBAROMETRY OF GRANODIORITES AND ZIRCON GEOCHRONOLOGY OF BROADLY COEVAL VOLCANICS (MINARETS AND MERCED PEAK COMPLEXES), SIERRA NEVADA BATHOLITH, CALIFORNIA
- Instrusive Suite of Buena Vista Crest
