= Geology of the United States =

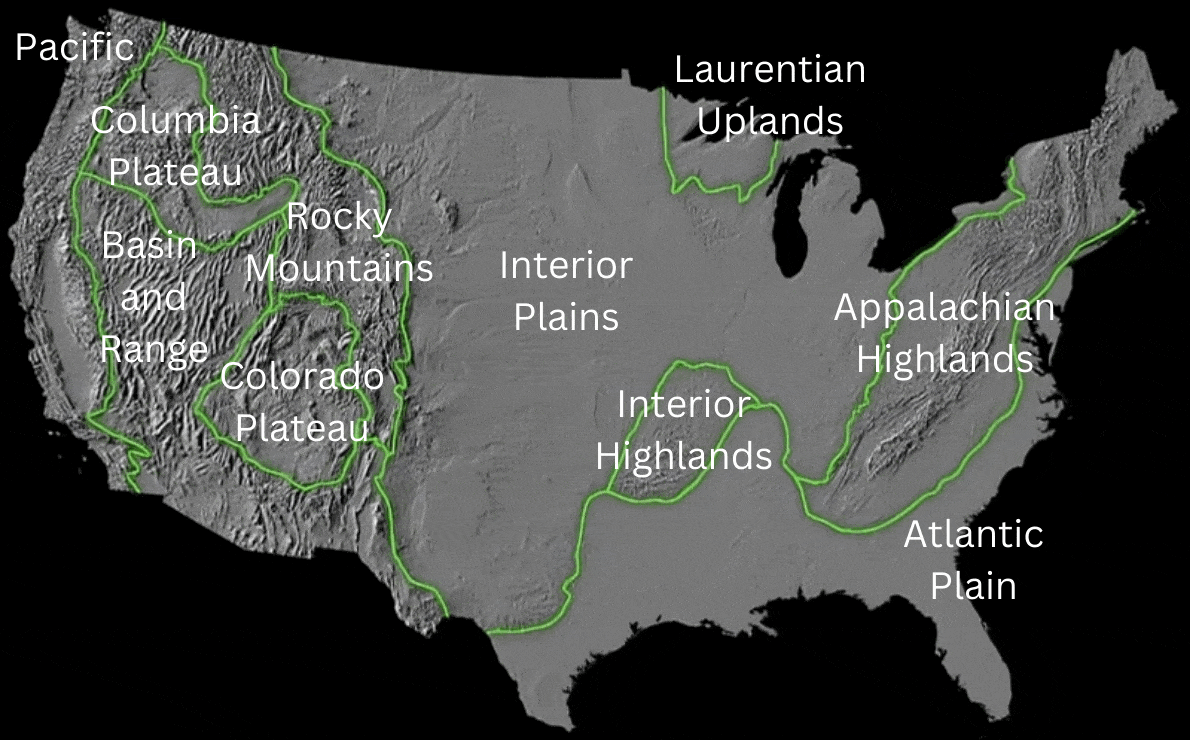
Shaded relief map of the United States, showing 10 geological provinces

The richly textured landscape of the United States is a product of the dueling forces of plate tectonics, weathering and erosion. Over the 4.5 billion-year history of the Earth, tectonic upheavals and colliding plates have raised great mountain ranges while the forces of erosion and weathering worked to tear them down. Even after many millions of years, records of Earth's great upheavals remain imprinted as textural variations and surface patterns that define distinctive landscapes or provinces.

The diversity of the landscapes of the United States can be easily seen on the shaded relief image to the right. The stark contrast between the 'rough' texture of the western US and the 'smooth' central and eastern regions is immediately apparent. Differences in roughness (topographic relief) result from a variety of processes acting on the underlying rock. The plate tectonic history of a region strongly influences the rock type and structure exposed at the surface, but differing rates of erosion that accompany changing climates can also have profound impacts on the land.

There are twelve main geological provinces in the United States: Pacific, Columbia Plateau, Basin and Range, Colorado Plateau, Rocky Mountains, Laurentian Upland, Interior Plains, Interior Highlands, Appalachian Highlands, Atlantic Plain, Alaskan, and Hawaiian. Each province has its own geologic history and unique features. This article will describe each province in turn.

== Pacific Province ==
This region is one of the most geologically young and tectonically active in North America. The generally rugged, mountainous landscape of this province provides evidence of ongoing mountain-building.

The Pacific Province straddles the boundaries between several of Earth's moving plates:the source of the monumental forces required to build the sweeping arc of mountains that extends from Alaska to the southern reaches of South America. This province includes the active and sometimes deadly volcanoes of the Cascade Range and the young, steep mountains of the Pacific Border and the Sierra Nevada.

=== Sierra Nevada ===
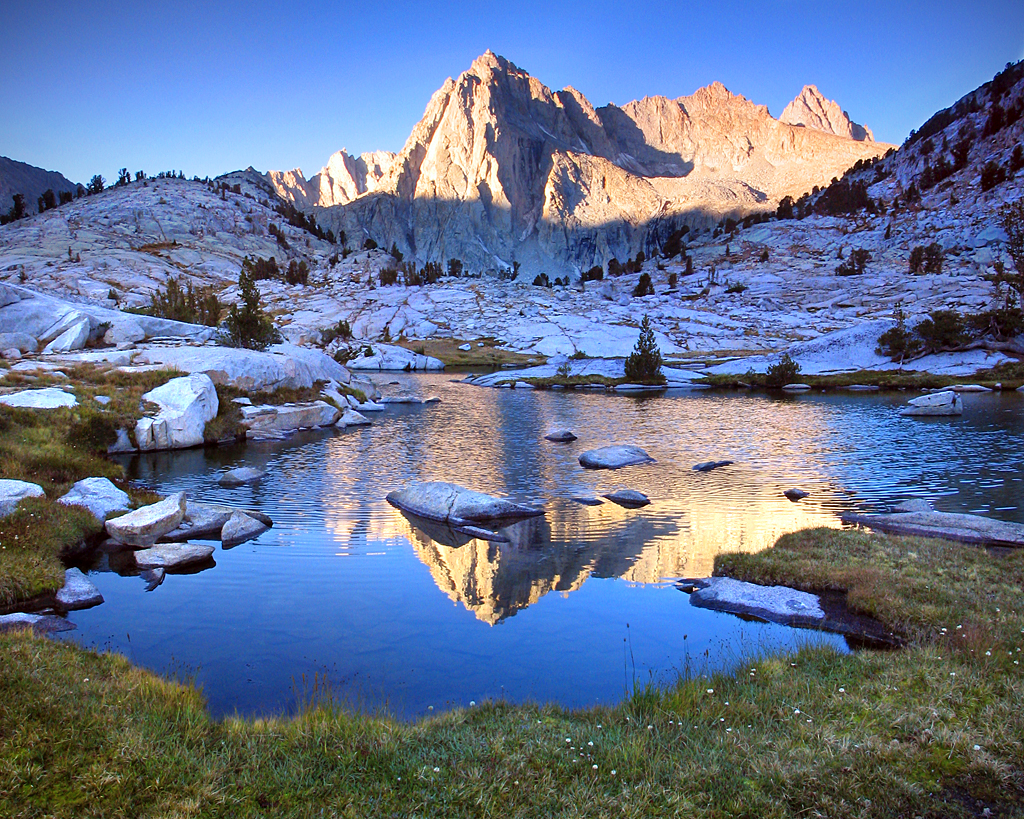
The exposed granite of the Sierra was formed deep underground.

Although the Sierra Nevada and Cascade Range form a nearly continuous barrier along the western edge of the United States, the two ranges really have very little in common. They have been and continue to be formed by quite different geological forces and processes.

The rocks that form the backbone of the Sierra Nevada are mostly granitic rocks that formed during the Mesozoic Era, when non-avian dinosaurs roamed the Earth. At that time, an arc-shaped chain of volcanoes, similar to the present-day Cascade volcanic arc, erupted where the Sierra Nevada now stands. Rising through older Paleozoic rock, molten rock erupted at the surface as lava, but most solidified deep within the earth, forming the gray granitic rocks familiar to any Sierra traveler.

Although from a distance the Sierran rock looks quite similar, it is actually made up of many individual rock bodies that formed from repeated intrusions of magma over many millions of years.

Even as they grew, erosion was wearing away these Mesozoic Era volcanoes. By Late Cretaceous time, about 70 million years ago, the once-deep granitic rocks began to be exposed at the Earth's surface. By a few tens of millions of years ago, so much of the upper part had worn away that the surface of the ancient range had a low relief of just a few thousand feet.

It wasn't until quite recently, geologically speaking, that the Sierra Nevada range as we know it today began to grow. During the Miocene Epoch, less than 20 million years ago, the continental crust east of the Sierra Nevada began to stretch in an east–west direction. The crust broke into a series of north–south-trending valleys and mountain ranges: the beginning of the Basin and Range province.

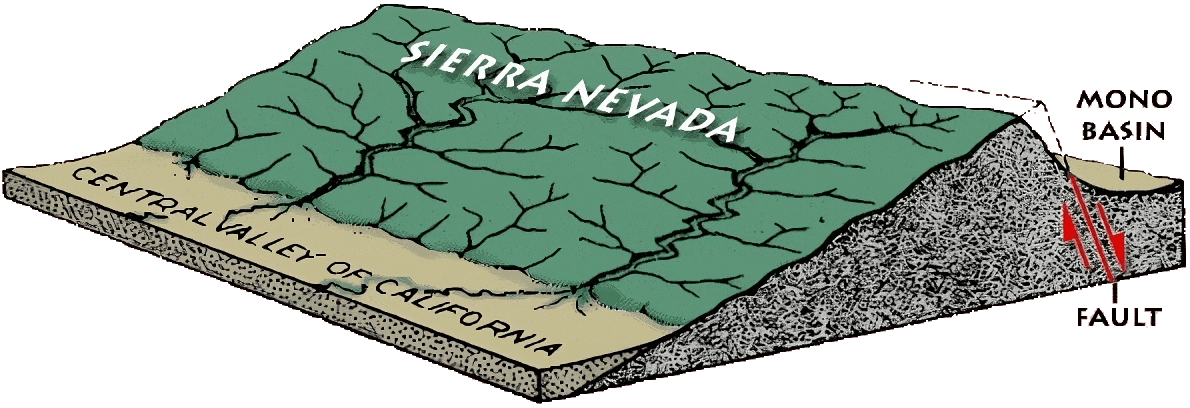
The height of the Sierra Nevada is caused by a fault on the eastern side of the mountains.

Less than five million years ago, the range that we now know as the Sierra Nevada began to rise along its eastern margin. Through a combination of uplift of the Sierran block and down-dropping of the area to the east, the Sierra rose upward. Rising far more steeply to the east than the west, the entire Sierra Nevada can be thought of as an enormous tilted fault block with a long, gentle slope westward to California's Central Valley and steep eastern slope.

Not long after the Sierra uplift began, the Earth cooled, marking the beginning of the Pleistocene (Ice Age) Epoch. Glaciers grew in the Sierra highlands and made their way down former stream channels, carving U-shaped valleys. The sheer walls and hanging valleys of Yosemite National Park are a product of this chilly past.

=== Cascades Volcanic Province ===
Where the Sierra Nevada ends, a chain of explosive volcanic centers, the Cascade volcanoes, begins. The Cascades Province forms an arc-shaped band extending from British Columbia to Northern California, roughly parallel to the Pacific coastline. Within this region, 13 major volcanic centers lie in sequence like a string of explosive pearls.

Although the largest volcanoes like Mount St. Helens get the most attention, the Cascades is really made up of a band of thousands of very small, short-lived volcanoes that have built a platform of lava and volcanic debris. Rising above this volcanic platform are a few strikingly large volcanoes that dominate the landscape.

The Cascades volcanoes define the Pacific Northwest section of the Ring of Fire, an array of volcanoes that rim the Pacific Ocean. As if volcanic hazards were not enough, the Ring of Fire is also infamous for its frequent earthquakes. In order to understand the origins of this concentrated band of Earth hazards, we have to slice deep into the Earth.

The Cascade Range is formed by an active continental margin

A slice of the Earth from the Pacific Ocean through the Pacific Northwest might look something like the adjacent image. Beneath the Cascades, a dense oceanic plate plunges beneath the North American plate; a process known as subduction. As the oceanic slab sinks deep into the Earth's interior beneath the continental plate, high temperatures and pressures allow water molecules locked in the minerals of solid rock to escape. The water vapor rises into the pliable mantle above the subducting plate, causing some of the mantle to melt. This newly formed magma rises toward the Earth's surface to erupt, forming a chain of volcanoes (the Cascade Range) above the subduction zone.

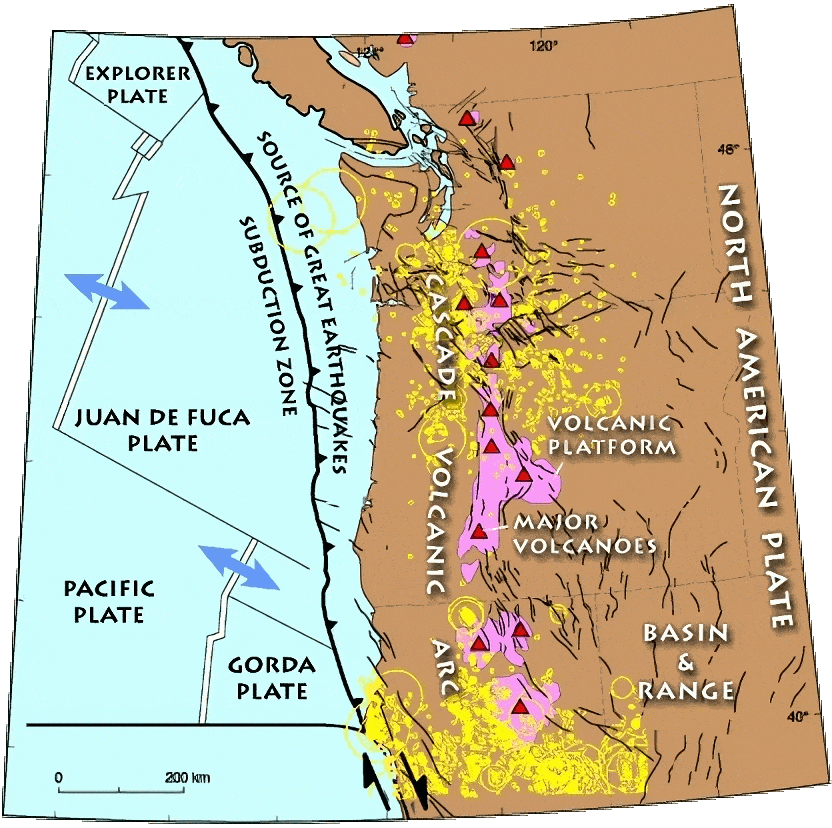
Geological map of the Cascade Range. Yellow indicates earthquakes, black lines indicate faults

A close-up look at the Cascades reveals a more complicated picture than the simple subduction zone shown in the image on the left. Not far off the coast of the North Pacific lies a spreading ridge; a divergent plate boundary made up of a series of breaks in the oceanic crust where new ocean crust is created. On one side of the spreading ridge new Pacific plate crust is made, then moves away from the ridge. On the other side of the spreading ridge the Juan de Fuca plate and Gorda plate move eastward.

There are some unusual features at the Cascade subduction zone. Where the Juan de Fuca plate sinks beneath the North American plate there is no deep trench, seismicity (earthquakes) are fewer than expected, and there is evidence of a decline in volcanic activity over the past few million years. The probable explanation lies in the rate of convergence between the Juan de Fuca and North American plates. These two plates converge at 3–4 centimeters per year at present. This is only about half the rate of convergence of 7 million years ago.

The small Juan de Fuca plate and two platelets, the Explorer plate and Gorda plate are the meager remnants of the much larger Farallon oceanic plate. The Explorer plate broke away from the Juan de Fuca about 4 million years ago and shows no evidence that it is still being subducted. The Gorda platelet split away between 18 and 5 million years ago and continues to sink beneath North America.

The Cascade Range made its first appearance 36 million years ago, but the major peaks that rise up from today's volcanic centers were born within the last 1.6 million years (during the Pleistocene). More than 3000 vents erupted during the most recent volcanic episode that began 5 million years ago. As long as subduction continues, new Cascade volcanoes will continue to rise.

== Columbia Plateau ==
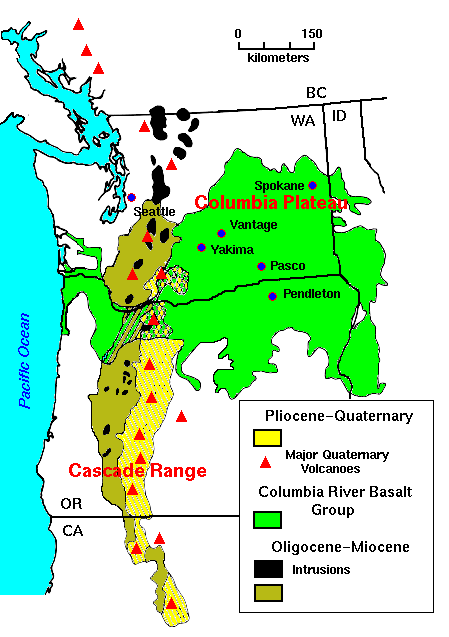
The Columbia Plateau covers part of three states

The Columbia Plateau province is enveloped by one of the world's largest accumulations of lava. Over 500,000 km^{2} (190,000 mi^{2}) of the Earth's surface is covered by it, an area roughly the size of the country of Spain. The topography here is dominated by geologically young lava flows that inundated the countryside with amazing speed, all within the last 17 million years.

Over 170,000 km^{3} (41,000 mi^{3}) of basaltic lava, known as the Columbia River basalts, covers the western part of the province. These tremendous flows erupted between 17 and 6 million years ago. Most of the lava flooded out in the first 1.5 million years: an extraordinarily short time for such an outpouring of molten rock.

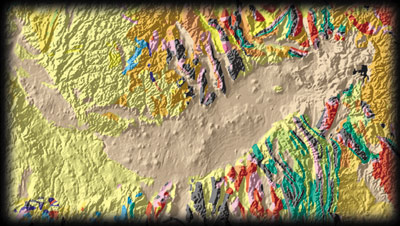
A map of the Snake River Plain, showing its smooth topography

The Snake River Plain stretches across Oregon, through northern Nevada, southern Idaho, and ends at the Yellowstone Plateau in Wyoming. Looking like a great spoon scooped out the Earth surface, the smooth topography of this province forms a striking contrast with the strong mountainous fabric around it.

The Snake River Plain lies in a distinct depression. At the western end, the base has dropped down along normal faults, forming a graben structure. Although there is extensive faulting at the eastern end, the structure is not as clear.

Like the Columbia River region, volcanic eruptions dominate the story of the Snake River Plain in the eastern part of the Columbia Plateau Province. The earliest Snake River Plain eruptions began about 15 million years ago, just as the tremendous early eruptions of Columbia River Basalt were ending. But most of the Snake River Plain volcanic rock is less than a few million years old, Pliocene age (5–1.6 million years ago) and younger.

In the west, the Columbia River Basalts are just that-almost exclusively black basalt. Not so in the Snake River Plain, where relatively quiet eruptions of soupy black basalt lava flows alternated with tremendous explosive eruptions of rhyolite, a light-colored volcanic rock.

Cinder cones dot the landscape of the Snake River Plain. Some are aligned along vents, the fissures that fed flows and cone-building eruptions. Calderas, great pits formed by explosive volcanism, and low shield volcanoes, and rhyolite hills are also part of the landscape here, but many are obscured by later lava flows.

Geologists usually associate volcanic eruptions with the boundaries between colliding or diverging plates. However, the focus of volcanism at Yellowstone in the Columbia Plateau Province is far inland from the subduction zone that lies along the Oregon and Washington coast. Evidence suggests that some concentrated heat source is melting rock beneath the Columbia Plateau Province, at the base of the lithosphere (the layer of crust and upper mantle that forms Earth's moving tectonic plates). In an effort to figure out why this area, far from a plate boundary, had such an enormous outpouring of lava, scientists established hardening dates for many of the individual lava flows. They found that the youngest volcanic rocks were clustered near the Yellowstone Plateau, and that the farther west they went, the older the lavas.

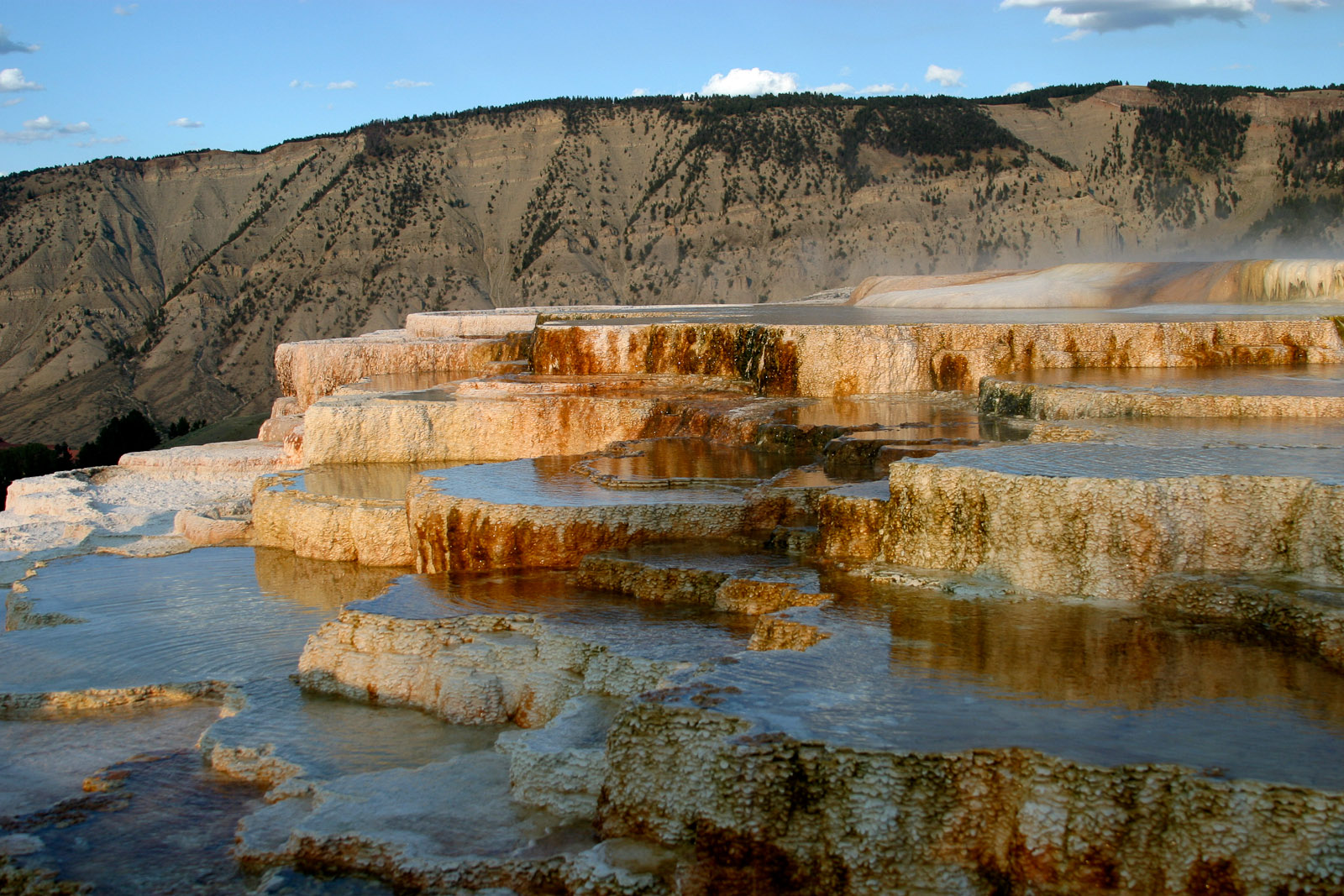
Mammoth Hot Springs is evidence of Yellowstone thermal activity

A probable explanation is that a hot spot, an extremely hot plume of deep mantle material, is rising to the surface beneath the Columbia Plateau Province. We know that beneath Hawaii and Iceland, a temperature instability develops (for reasons not yet well understood) at the boundary between the core and mantle. The concentrated heat triggers a plume hundreds of kilometers in diameter that ascends directly through to the surface of the Earth.

When the hot plume arrives at the base of the lithosphere, some of the lighter rock of the lithosphere rapidly melts. It is this molten lithosphere that becomes the basalt lavas that gush onto the surface to form the Columbia River and Snake River Plain basalts.

The track of this hot spot starts in the west and sweeps up to Yellowstone National Park. The steaming fumaroles and explosive geysers are ample evidence of a concentration of heat beneath the surface. The hot spot is stationary, but the North American plate is moving over it, creating a record of the rate and direction of plate motion.

== Basin and Range ==
The Basin and Range Province includes much of western North America. In the United States, it is bordered on the west by the eastern fault scarp of the Sierra Nevada and spans over 500 miles (800 km) to its eastern border marked by the Wasatch Fault, the Colorado Plateau and the Rio Grande Rift. The Basin and Range Province extends north to the Columbia Plateau and south as far as the Trans-Mexican Volcanic Belt in Mexico, though the southern boundaries of the Basin and Range are debated.

The Basin and Range province has a characteristic topography that is familiar to anyone who ventures across it. Steep climbs up elongate mountain ranges alternate with long treks across flat, dry deserts. This basic topographic pattern extends from eastern California to central Utah, and from southern Idaho into the state of Sonora in Mexico. The forces which created this distinct topography lie deep beneath the surface.

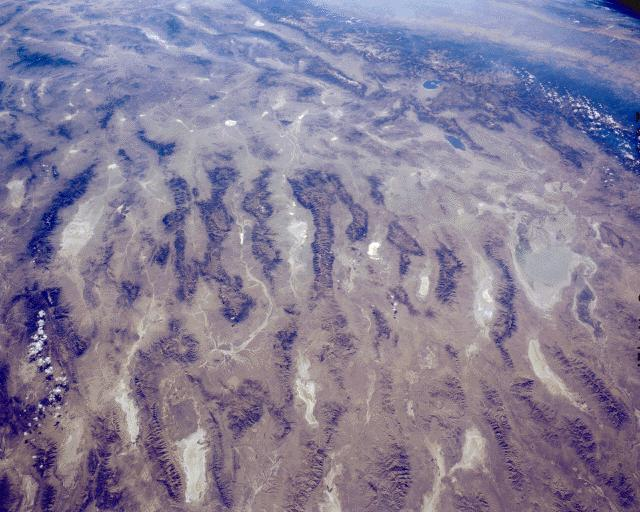
The Basin and Range province, in central Nevada, as seen from space.

Within the Basin and Range Province, the Earth's crust (and upper mantle) has been stretched up to 100% of its original width. The entire region has been subjected to extension that thinned and cracked the crust as it was pulled apart, creating large faults. Along these roughly north–south-trending faults mountains were uplifted and valleys down-dropped, producing the distinctive alternating pattern of linear mountain ranges and valleys of the Basin and Range province.

Although there are other types of faults in the Basin and Range province, the extension and crustal stretching that have shaped the present landscape produce mostly normal faults. The upthrown side of these faults form mountains that rise abruptly and steeply, and the down-dropped side creates low valleys. The fault plane, along which the two sides of the fault move, extends deep in the crust, usually an angle of 60 degrees. In places, the relief or vertical difference between the two sides is as much as 10,000 feet (3,000 m).

As the rocky ranges rise, they are immediately subject to weathering and erosion. The exposed bedrock is attacked by water, ice, wind and other erosional agents. Rock particles are stripped away and wash down the mountain sides, often covering young faults until they rupture again. Sediment collects in the adjacent valleys, in some places burying the bedrock under thousands of feet of rock debris.

Clarence Dutton famously compared the many narrow parallel mountain ranges that distinguish the unique topography of the Basin and Range to an "army of caterpillars marching toward Mexico", which is a helpful way to visualize the overall appearance of the region. The Basin and Range province should not be confused with The Great Basin, which is a sub-section of the greater Basin and Range physiographic region defined by its unique hydrological characteristics (internal drainage).

=== Great Basin ===
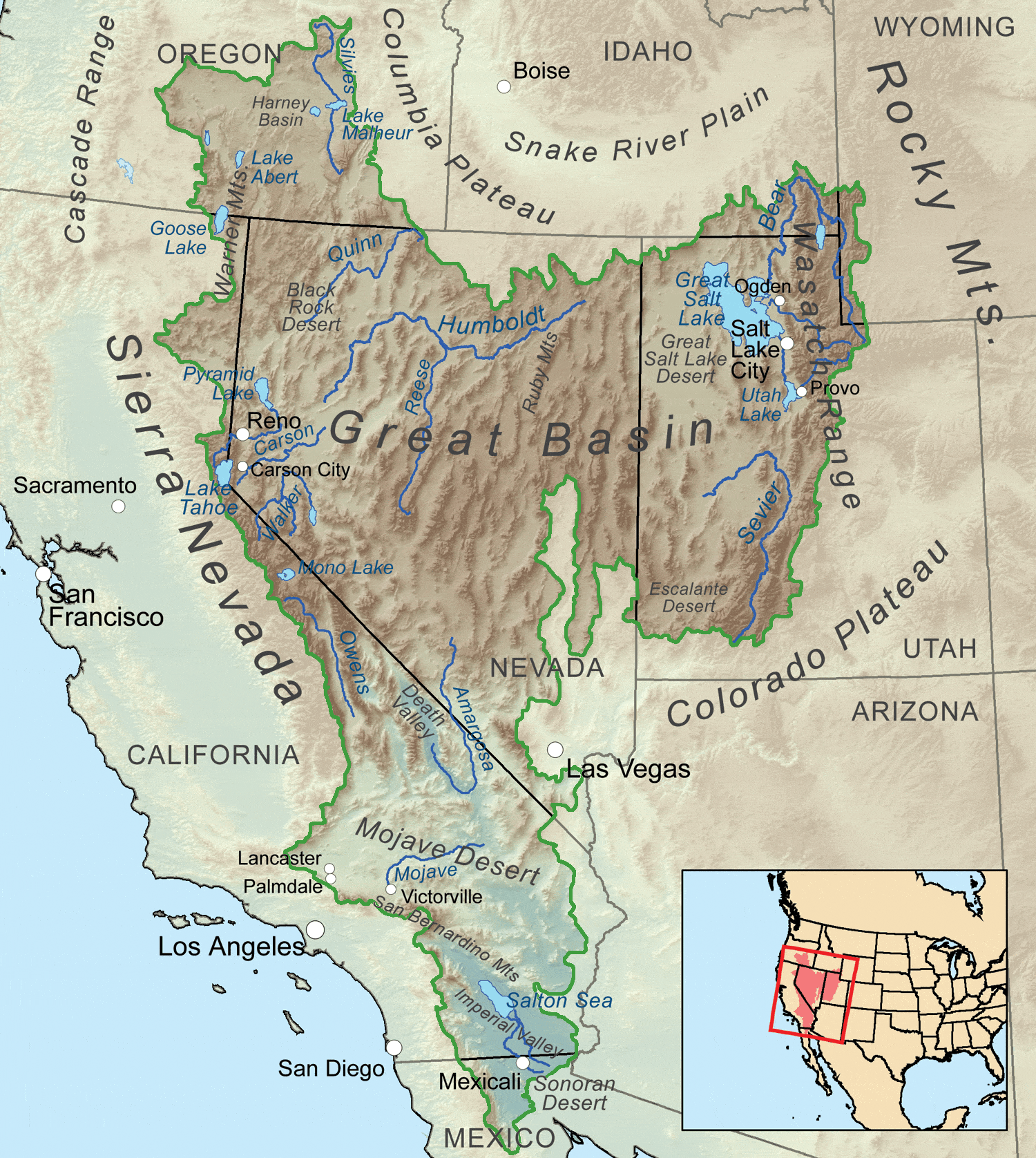
Map of the Great Basin

The Great Basin is the geographical and hydrological region comprising most of Nevada, southern Oregon and Idaho, western Utah, and a little of eastern California. Characterized by internal drainage, this region's surface water sources evaporate or percolate before they can flow to the ocean.

The Basin and Range province's dynamic fault history has profoundly affected the Great Basin's water drainage system. Most precipitation in the Great Basin falls in the form of snow that melts in the spring. Rain that reaches the ground, or snow that melts, quickly evaporates in the dry desert environment. Some of the water that does not evaporate sinks into the ground to become ground water. The remaining water flows into streams and collects in short-lived lakes called playas on the valley floor and eventually evaporates. Any water that falls as rain or snow into this region does not escape out of it; not one of the streams that originate within this basin ever find an outlet to the ocean. The extent of internal drainage, the area in which surface water cannot reach the ocean, defines the geographic region called the Great Basin.

The Great Basin's internal drainage results from blockage of water movement by high fault-created mountains and by lack of sufficient water flow to merge with larger drainages outside of the Great Basin. This internally-drained area occupies approximately 200,000 square miles (520,000 km^{2}), including most of Nevada, a large part of Utah, and portions of Idaho, California, and Oregon. Much of the present-day Great Basin would drain to the sea, just as it did in the recent Ice Ages, if there were more rain and snowfall.

== Colorado Plateau ==
The Colorado Plateau is roughly centered on the Four Corners region of the southwestern United States. The province covers an area of 337,000 km^{2} (130,000 mi^{2}) within western Colorado, northwestern New Mexico, southern and eastern Utah, and northern Arizona. About 90% of the area is drained by the Colorado River and its main tributaries: the Green, San Juan, and Little Colorado.

The sculptured beauty and brilliant colors of the Colorado Plateau's sedimentary rock layers have captured the imaginations of countless geologists. This is a vast region of plateaus, mesas, and deep canyons whose walls expose rocks ranging in age from billions to just a few hundred years old.

Ancient Precambrian rocks, exposed only in the deepest canyons, make up the basement of the Colorado Plateau. Most are metamorphic rocks formed deep within the Earth while continental collision on a grand scale produced the nucleus of the North American continent well over a billion years ago. Igneous rocks injected millions of years later form a marbled network through parts of the Colorado Plateau's darker metamorphic basement.

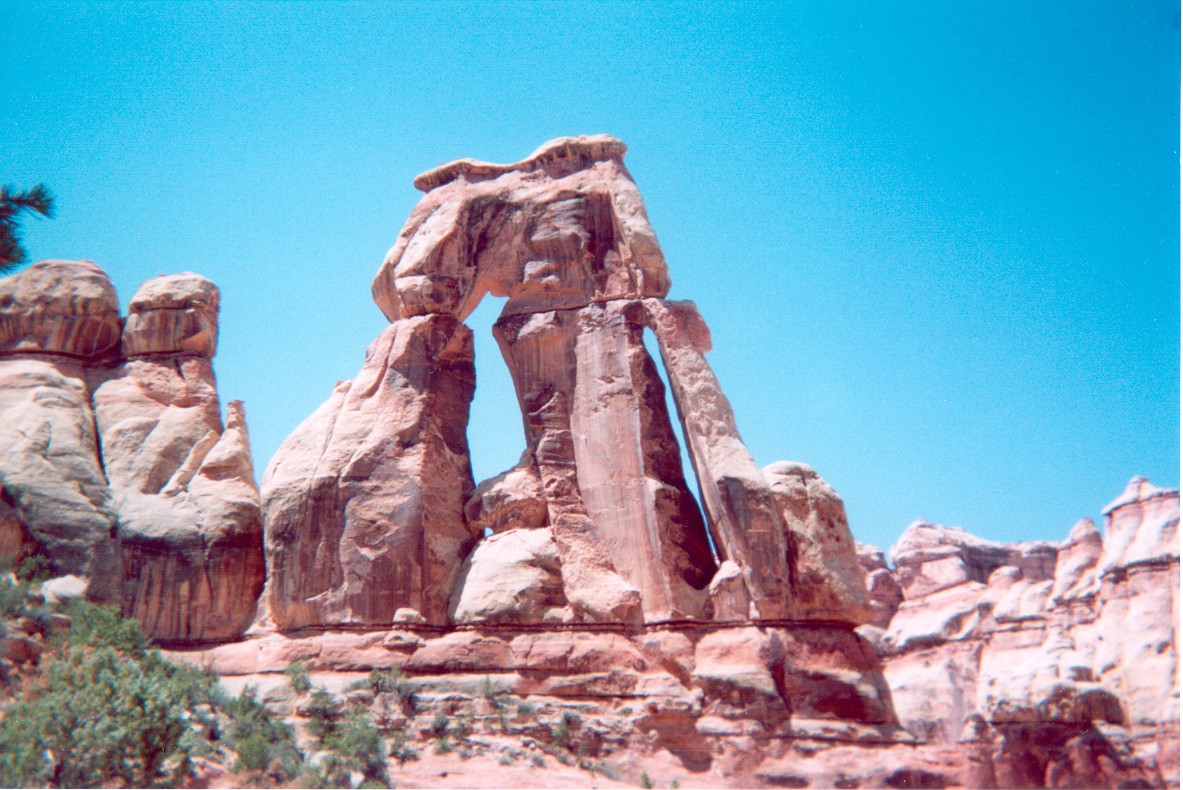
Cedar Mesa Sandstone forms the Druid Arch, in Canyonlands National Park

These deeply-formed rocks were uplifted, eroded, and exposed for eons. By 600 million years ago, North America had been beveled off to a remarkably smooth surface. It is on this crystalline rock surface that the younger, more familiar layered rocks of the Colorado Plateau were deposited.

Throughout the Paleozoic Era, the Colorado Plateau region was periodically inundated by tropical seas. Thick layers of limestone, sandstone, siltstone, and shale were laid down in the shallow marine waters. During times when the seas retreated, stream deposits and dune sands were deposited or older layers were removed by erosion. Over 300 million years passed as layer upon layer of sediment accumulated.

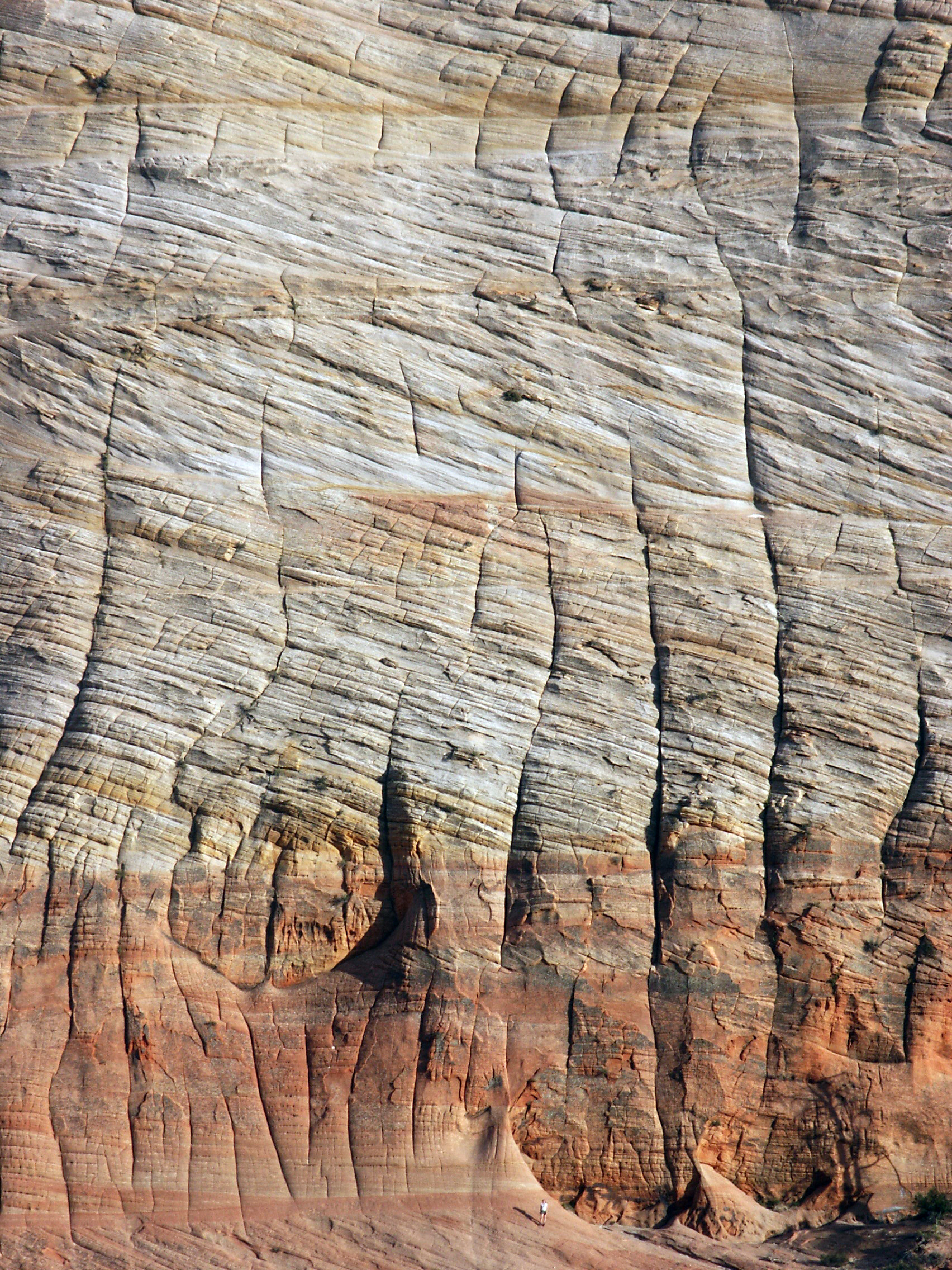
Crossbedded Navajo Sandstone in Zion National Park

It was not until the upheavals that coincided with the formation of the supercontinent Pangea began about 250 million years ago that deposits of marine sediment waned and terrestrial deposits dominate. The Mesozoic Era sedimentary deposits are striking. Great accumulations of dune sand hardened to form sweeping arcs in cross-bedded sandstone. Eruptions from volcanic mountain ranges to the west buried vast regions beneath ashy debris. Short-lived rivers, lakes, and inland seas left sedimentary records of their passage.

One of the most geologically intriguing features of the Colorado Plateau is its remarkable stability. Relatively little rock deformation (e.g., faulting and folding) has affected this high, thick crustal block within the last 600 million years or so. In contrast, the plateau is surrounded by provinces that have suffered severe deformation. Mountain building thrust up the Rocky Mountains to the north and east and tremendous, earth-stretching tension created the Basin and Range Province to the west and south.

Although the Basin and Range and Colorado Plateau may seem to have little in common, their geological stories are intimately intertwined. In the early part of this Era (Paleogene Period), both regions had low elevations of probably less than 1 kilometer. Geologists are still gathering evidence and debating what came next.

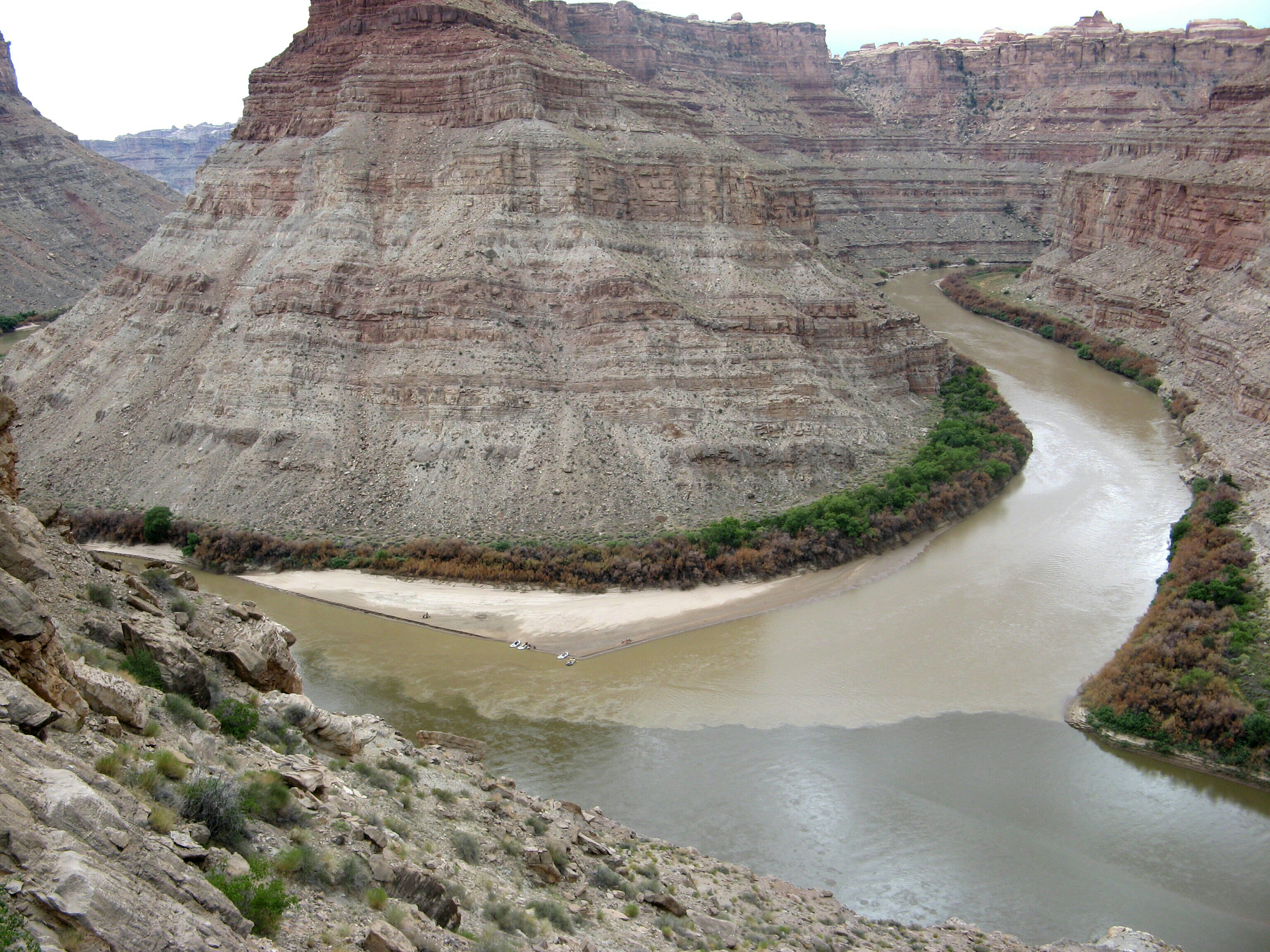
The confluence of the Colorado and Green rivers

Beginning about 20 million years ago, during the Miocene Epoch, both the Basin and Range and Colorado Plateau regions were uplifted as much as 3 kilometers. Great tension developed in the crust, probably related to changing plate motions far to the west. As the crust stretched, the Basin and Range Province broke up into a multitude of down-dropped valleys and elongate mountains. Yet for some reason not fully understood, the neighboring Colorado Plateau was able to preserve its structural integrity and remained a single tectonic block. Eventually, the great block of Colorado Plateau crust rose a kilometer higher than the Basin and Range.

As the land rose, the streams responded by cutting ever deeper stream channels. The most well-known of these streams, the Colorado River, began to carve the Grand Canyon less than 6 million years ago. The forces of erosion have exposed the vivid kaleidoscope of rock layers that make the Colorado Plateau a mecca for rock lovers.

== Rocky Mountain System ==
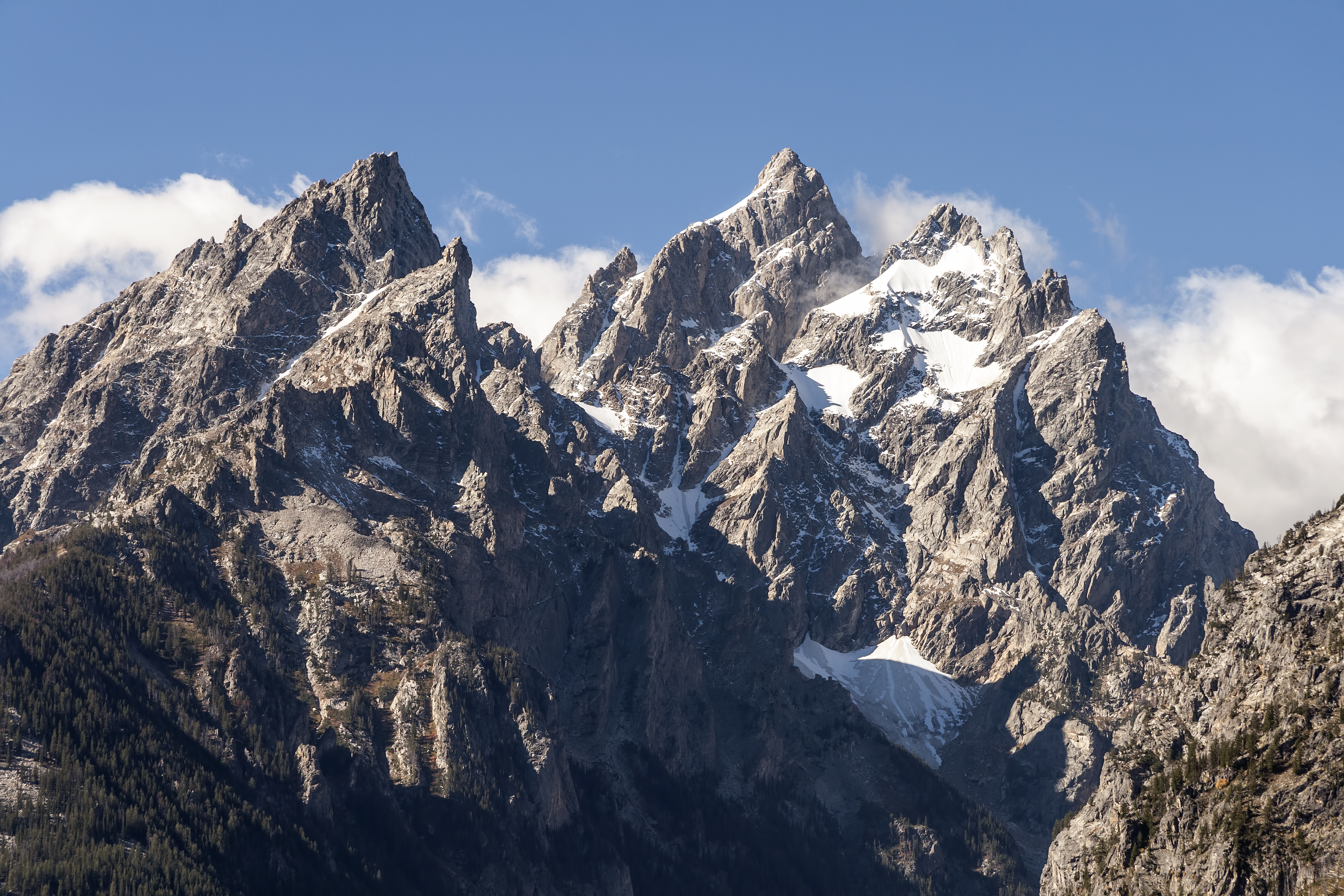
Cathedral Group, Grand Teton National Park, Wyoming

The Rockies form a majestic mountain barrier that stretches from Canada through central New Mexico. Although formidable, a look at the topography reveals a discontinuous series of mountain ranges with distinct geological origins.

The rocks making up the mountains were formed before the mountains were raised. The cores of the mountain ranges are in most places formed of pieces of continental crust that are over one billion years old. In the south, an older mountain range was formed 300 million years ago, then eroded away. The rocks of that older range were reformed into the Rocky Mountains.

The Rocky Mountains took shape during a period of intense plate tectonic activity that formed much of the rugged landscape of the western United States. Three major mountain-building episodes reshaped the west from about 170 to 40 million years ago (Jurassic to Cenozoic Periods). The last mountain building event, the Laramide orogeny, (about 70-40 million years ago) the last of the three episodes, is responsible for raising the Rocky Mountains.

During the last half of the Mesozoic Era, the Age of the Dinosaurs, much of today's California, Oregon, and Washington were added to North America. Western North America suffered the effects of repeated collision as slabs of ocean crust sank beneath the continental edge. Slivers of continental crust, carried along by subducting ocean plates, were swept into the subduction zone and scraped onto North America's edge.

About 200–300 miles inland, magma generated above the subducting slab rose into the North American continental crust. Great arc-shaped volcanic mountain ranges grew as lava and ash spewed out of dozens of individual volcanoes. Beneath the surface, great masses of molten rock were injected and hardened in place.

For 100 million years the effects of plate collisions were focused very near the edge of the North American plate boundary, far to the west of the Rocky Mountain region. It was not until 70 million years ago that these effects began to reach the Rockies.

The growth of the Rocky Mountains has been one of the most perplexing of geologic puzzles. Normally, mountain building is focused between 200 and 400 miles inland from a subduction zone boundary, yet the Rockies are hundreds of miles farther inland. Although geologists continue to gather evidence to explain the rise of the Rockies, the answer most likely lies with an unusual subducting slab.

At a 'typical' subduction zone, an oceanic plate typically sinks at a fairly high angle (see above). A volcanic arc grows above the subducting plate. During the growth of the Rocky Mountains, the angle of the subducting plate may have been significantly flattened, moving the focus of melting and mountain building much farther inland than is normally expected.

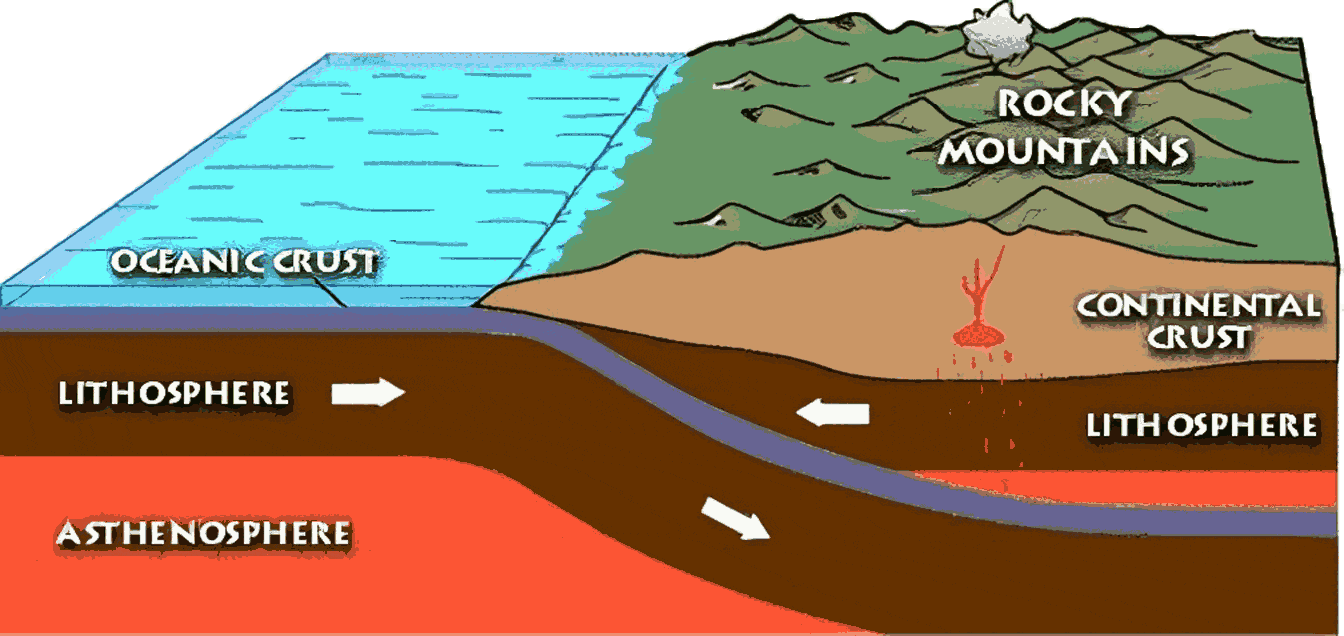
The Laramide orogeny was caused by subduction at an unusually shallow angle.

It is postulated that the shallow angle of the subducting plate greatly increased the friction and other interactions with the thick continental mass above it. Tremendous thrusts piled sheets of crust on top of each other, building the extraordinarily broad, high Rocky Mountain range.

As of 60 million years ago, the Rockies were like Tibet: a high plateau, probably 6,000 metres (20,000 ft) above sea level. Since then, erosion stripped away the high rocks, revealing the ancestral rocks beneath, and forming the current landscape of the Rockies. Periods of glaciation occurred from the Pleistocene Epoch (1.8 million–70,000 years ago) to the Holocene Epoch (fewer than 11,000 years ago). The ice ages left their mark on the Rockies, forming extensive glacial landforms, such as U-shaped valleys and cirques.

== Laurentian Upland ==
Every continent has a core of very ancient metamorphic rocks. The Superior Upland Province is the southern extension of the Laurentian Upland Province, part of the nucleus of North America called the Canadian Shield. The basement rocks of the Laurentian Upland Province were metamorphosed about 2500 million years ago in a mountain-building collision of tectonic plates called the Kenoran Orogeny.

The rocks of the Superior Upland are mostly Precambrian metamorphic rocks and overlying Paleozoic rocks (Cambrian) covered by a thin veneer of glacial deposits left behind when glaciers melted at the end of the Pleistocene Ice Age. If we could strip away all of the younger rocks deposited on top of buried Precambrian basement, you would see a landscape of low relief. The topography of the Precambrian rocks is very subdued, with barely 500 feet difference between the highest point and the lowest. Clearly, this region was exposed to a very long period of erosion in the very distant past which beveled the original mountainous surface to a gently undulating surface. The present surface is not much different. Hills rise just a few hundred feet above the surrounding countryside. The highest of these, such as Rib Hill, Wisconsin, are made up mostly of resistant quartzite or granite.

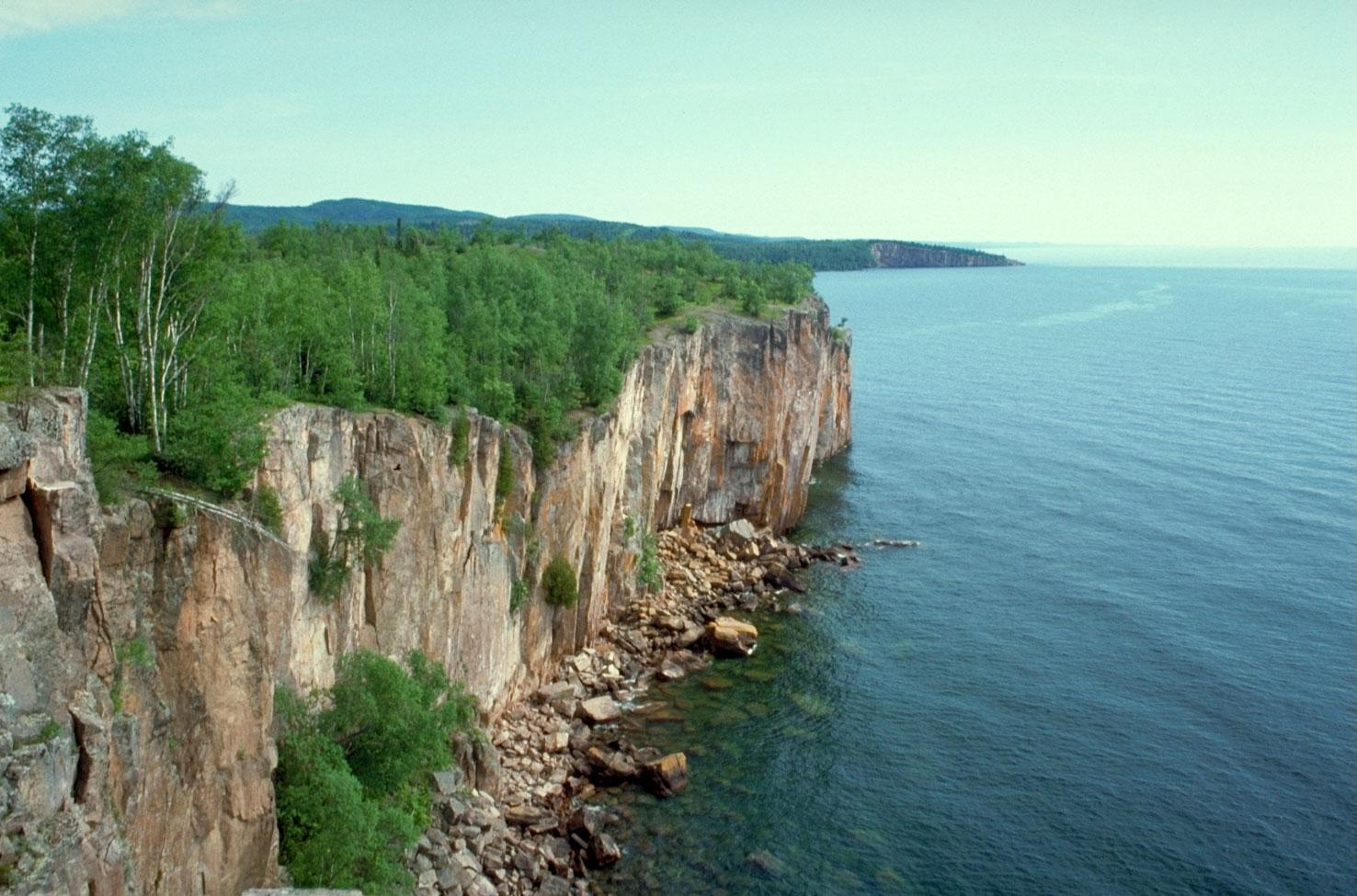
The north shore of Lake Superior showing lava that erupted more than 1 billion years ago

The structure of Superior Upland rock is quite complex. Folds and faults, most dating back to Precambrian time, record several episodes of mountain-building. The plate collisions that formed the core of our continent left behind a striking structural trend. Ridges and valleys are strongly aligned along this northeast–southwest trend. Lake Superior is an example of this northeast–southwest structural trend. Ridges of erosion-resistant rock rise above valleys and carved into weaker rock units.

The effects of repeated glaciation have left their mark on the Superior Upland. The present glacial topography is the product of the most recent glaciation that ended just 10,000 years ago. During the Late Wisconsin, the last glaciation of the Pleistocene Epoch, a massive continental ice sheet grew first in the north, then gradually expanded southward. Several thick finger-like lobes of glacial ice engulfed the region as they moved through the Superior basin. Rocks of all sizes were plucked and scoured from farther north and carried along by the icy mass. When the continental ice sheets melt, they left behind an assortment of rock called glacial drift that covers much of the Superior Upland landscape.

== Interior Plains ==
The Interior Plains is a vast region that spreads across the stable core of North America. This area had formed when several small continents collided and welded together well over a billion years ago, during the Precambrian. Precambrian metamorphic and igneous rocks now form the basement of the Interior Plains and make up the stable nucleus of North America. With the exception of the Black Hills of South Dakota, the entire region has low relief, reflecting more than 500 million years of relative tectonic stability.

Throughout the Paleozoic and Mesozoic Eras the mostly low-lying Interior Plains region remained relatively unaffected by the mountain-building tectonic collisions suffered by the western and eastern margins of the continent.

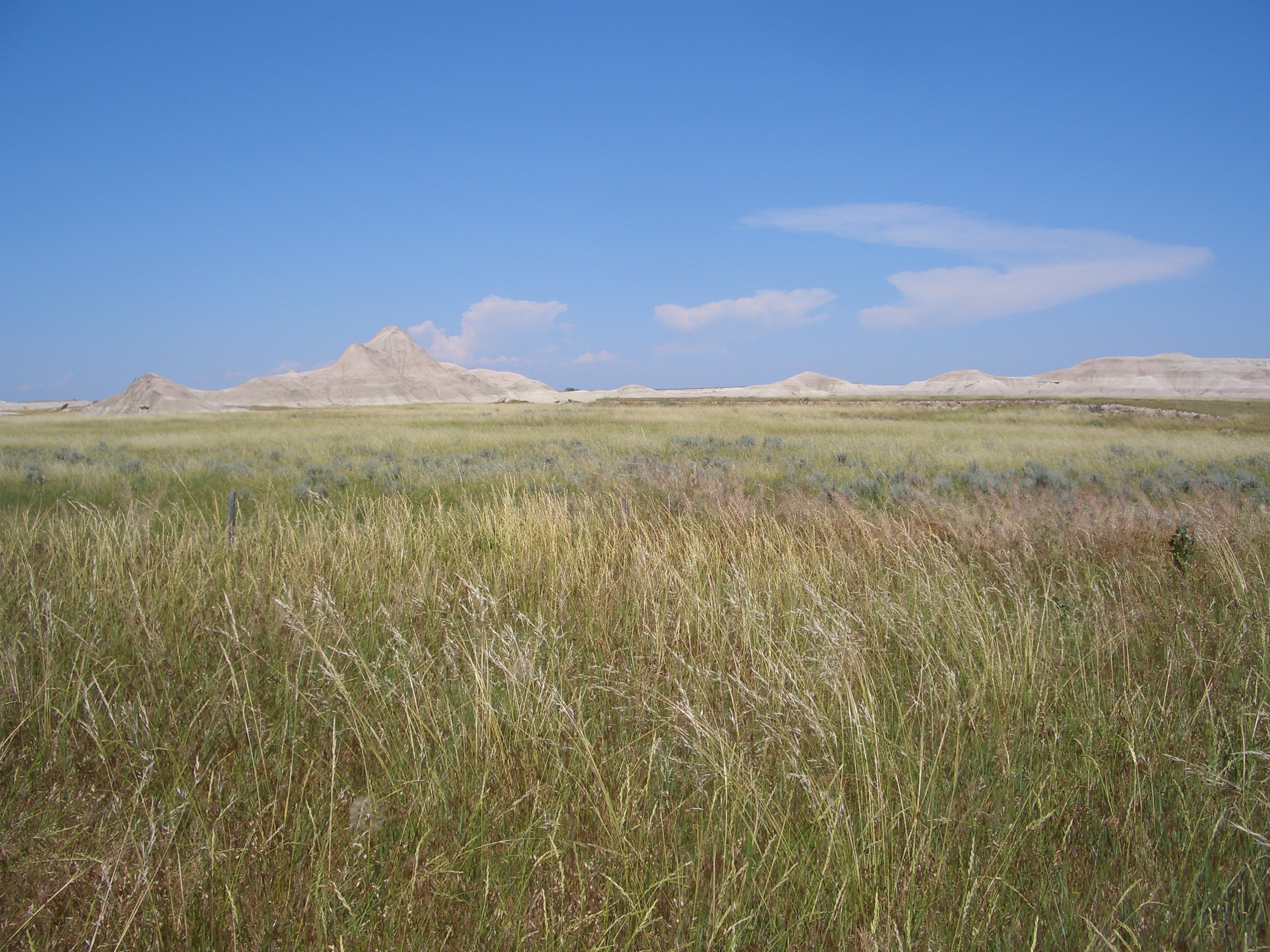
Prairie and low hills in the Oglala National Grassland, Nebraska

During much of the Mesozoic Era, the North American continental interior was mostly well above sea level, with two notable exceptions. During part of the Jurassic (208-144 million years ago), rising seas flooded the low-lying areas of the continent. Much of the Interior Plains eventually lay submerged beneath the shallow Sundance Sea.

Sediments eroding from the rising Rocky Mountains to the west washed into the sea and deposited as layered wedges of fine debris. As sand, mud, and clays accumulated, the Sundance Sea retreated northward. Preserved within the multi-hued sandstones, mudstones, and clays that made up the shoreline, are the remains of countless dinosaurs that roamed the Sundance coast.

The fossil assemblages concealed within the sedimentary layers of the Morrison Formation are among the world's richest. In some areas, bones of many dinosaurs are concentrated in a very small area, indicating that they were carried during floods, then deposited together beside a stream.

Once again, during the Cretaceous Period (144-65 million years ago), record high sea levels flooded the continental interior with shallow seas.

The Interior Plains continued to receive deposits from the eroding Rocky Mountains to the west and Appalachian and Ozark/Ouachita Mountains to the east and south throughout the most recent Era, the Cenozoic. The flatness of the Interior Plains is a reflection of the platform of mostly flat-lying marine and stream deposits laid down in the Mesozoic and Cenozoic Eras.

== Appalachians, Interior Highlands, and Atlantic Plains ==
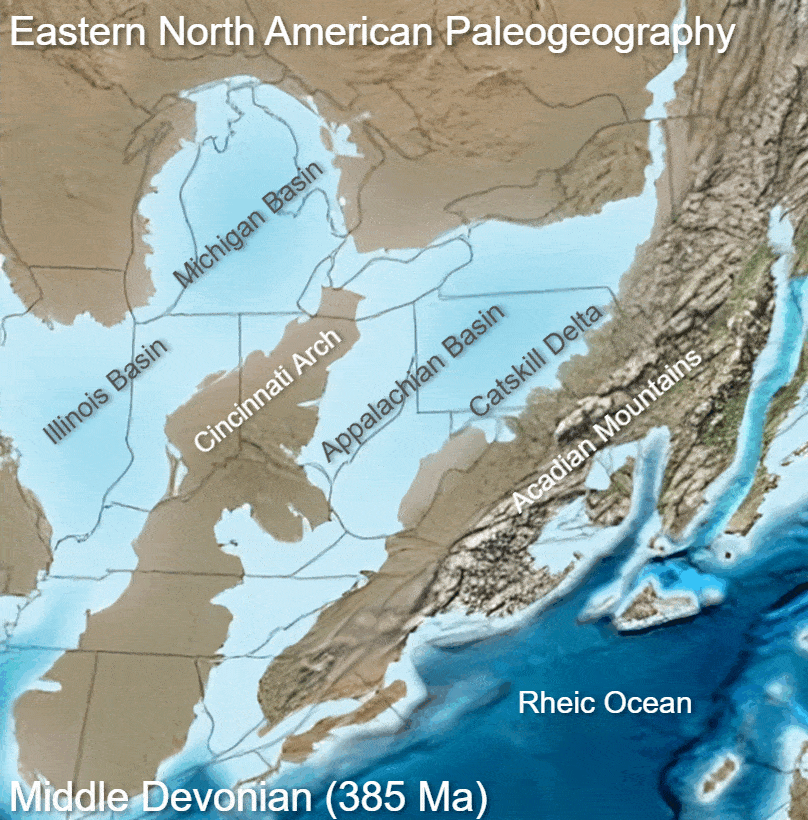
Paleogeographic reconstruction showing the Appalachian Basin area during the Middle Devonian period.

The rocks of the Appalachian, Ouachita, Ozark Mountains are old and share a common origin. They largely consist of sedimentary rocks of Paleozoic age that were deposited on the sea floor and are presently folded and faulted. The Appalachians also have volcanic rocks and slivers of ancient sea floor. These mountains were once part of a mighty uplifted mountain range that stretch from the Appalachian Highlands through Texas.

During the earliest Paleozoic Era, the continent that would later become North America straddled the equator. The Appalachian region was a passive plate margin, not unlike today's Atlantic Coastal Plain Province. During this interval, the region was periodically submerged beneath shallows seas. Thick layers of sediment and carbonate rock was deposited on the shallow sea bottom when the region was submerged. When seas receded, terrestrial sedimentary deposits and erosion dominated.

During the middle Ordovician Period (about 440–480 million years ago), a change in plate motions set the stage for the first Paleozoic mountain building event (Taconic orogeny) in North America. The once quiet, Appalachian passive margin changed to a very active plate boundary when a neighboring oceanic plate, the Iapetus, collided with and began sinking beneath the North American craton. With the birth of this new subduction zone, the early Appalachians were born.

Along the continental margin, volcanoes grew, coincident with the initiation of subduction. Thrust faulting uplifted and warped older sedimentary rock laid down on the passive margin. As mountains rose, erosion began to wear them down. Streams carried rock debris downslope to be deposited in nearby lowlands.

Animation of Pangea breaking up

This was just the first of a series of mountain building plate collisions that contributed to the formation of the Appalachians. Mountain building continued periodically throughout the next 250 million years (Caledonian, Acadian, Ouachita, Hercynian, and Alleghenian orogenies). The Pangean supercontinent began to take shape. Microplates, smaller bits of crust too small to be called continents, were swept in, one by one, to be welded to the growing mass.

By about 300 million years ago (Pennsylvanian Period) Africa was approaching North American craton. The collisional belt spread into the Ozark-Ouachita region and through the Marathon Mountains of Texas. Continent vs. continent collision raised the Appalachian-Ouachita chain to lofty, Himalayan-scale ranges. The massive bulk of Pangea was completed near the end of the Paleozoic Era (Permian Period) when Africa (Gondwana) plowed into the continental agglomeration, with the Appalachian-Ouachita mountains near the core. From about 280-230 million years ago, (Late Paleozoic Era until the Late Triassic) the continent we now know as North America was continuous with Africa, South America, and Europe.

During the Late Triassic, Pangea began to be torn apart when a three-pronged fissure grew between Africa, South America, and North America. Rifting began as magma welled up through the weakness in the crust, creating a volcanic rift zone. Volcanic eruptions spewed ash and volcanic debris across the landscape as these severed continent-sized fragments of Pangea diverged. The gash between the spreading continents gradually grew to form a new ocean basin, the Atlantic. The rift zone known as the mid-Atlantic ridge continued to provide the raw volcanic materials for the expanding ocean basin.

North America was slowly pulled westward away from the rift zone. The thick continental crust that made up the new east coast collapsed into a series of down-dropped fault blocks that roughly parallel today's coastline. At first, the hot, faulted edge of the continent was high and buoyant relative to the new ocean basin. As the edge of North America moved away from the hot rift zone, it began to cool and subside beneath the new Atlantic Ocean. This once-active divergent plate boundary became the passive, trailing edge of westward moving North America. In plate tectonic terms, the Atlantic Plain is known as a classic example of a passive continental margin.

During the rifting, South America tore away from North America and headed southward. The ocean flooded into the opening between the two continents, forming the Gulf of Mexico. A record of this rifting event remains as an indelible mark on the landscape called Mississippi Embayment. It is this embayment that ripped the dramatic gap between the southern Appalachians and the Ouachita-Ozark Highlands.

Weathering and erosion prevailed, and the mountains began to wear away. By the end of the Mesozoic Era, the Appalachian-Ouachita Mountains had been eroded to an almost flat plain. Sediments eroded from these highlands were carried east and southward by streams and gradually covered the faulted continental margin, burying it under a wedge, thousands of feet thick, of layered sedimentary and volcanic debris. Today most Mesozoic and Cenozoic sedimentary rock layers that lie beneath much of the coastal plain and fringing continental shelf remain nearly horizontal or tilt gently toward the sea.

During the Cenozoic, the geology of the different regions diverged. The Appalachians started to uplift, while the Ouachita and Ozarks did not. The uplift rejuvenated the streams, which rapidly responded by cutting downward into the ancient bedrock. Some streams flowed along weak layers that define the folds and faults created many millions of years earlier. Other streams downcut so rapidly that they cut right across the resistant folded rocks of the mountain core, carving canyons across rock layers and geologic structures.

== Alaska ==
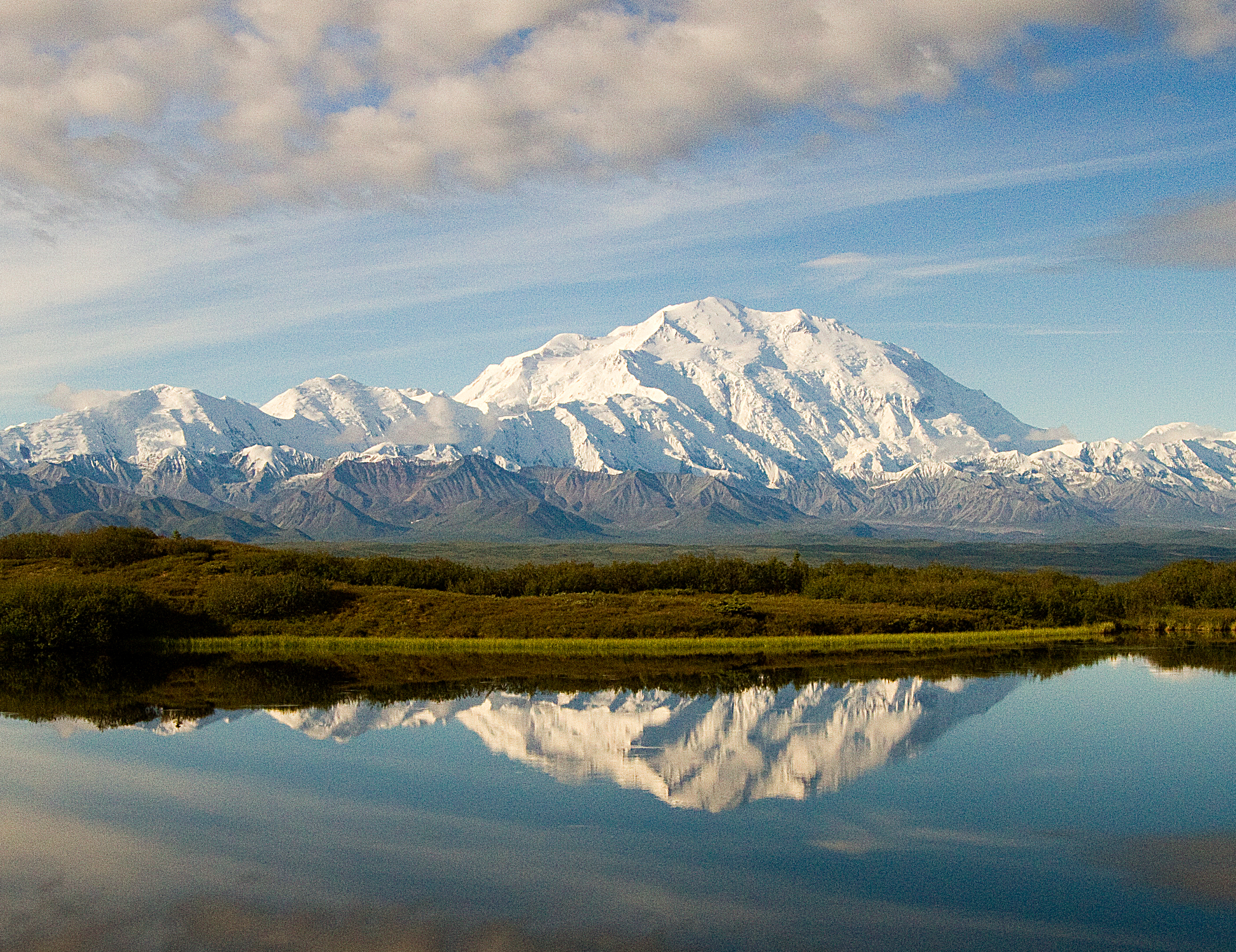
Denali is the highest mountain in North America.

Most of Alaska consists of terranes accreted by collisions with island arcs carried in over the last 160 million years. These terranes were caused by the subduction of the Farallon, Kula, and Pacific plates sequentially. Currently, the Pacific plate is subducting beneath Alaska, producing the Aleutian Arc series of volcanoes through the Alaskan Peninsula and Aleutian Islands.

One of the sutures left by terrane addition is the Denali Fault, which curves through south-central Alaska. The Denali Fault bends just north of Denali. The combination of the subduction of the Pacific plate and the bend in the Denali Fault causes Denali to be the highest mountain in North America.

== Hawaii ==
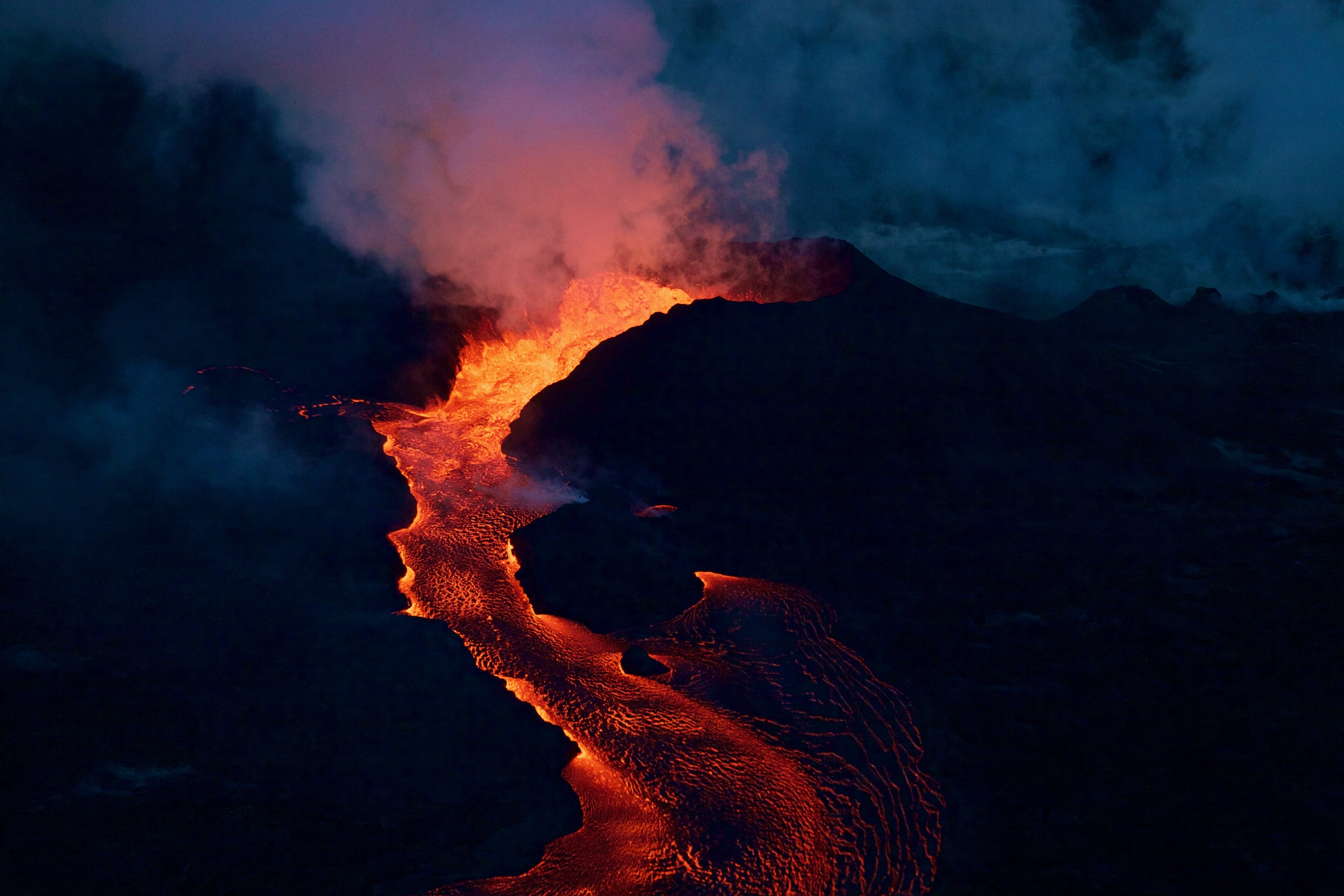
Fissure eruption of Kīlauea in 2018

The State of Hawaii consists of a chain of islands, or archipelago. The archipelago developed as the Pacific plate moved slowly northwestward over a hotspot in the Earth's mantle at a rate of approximately 32 miles (51 km) per million years. Thus, the southeast island (Hawaiʻi) is volcanically active whereas the islands on the northwest end of the archipelago are older and typically smaller, due to longer exposure to erosion. The age of the archipelago has been estimated using potassium-argon dating methods. From this study and others, it is estimated that the northwesternmost island, the Kure Atoll, is the oldest at approximately 28 million years (Ma); while Hawaiʻi, is approximately 0.4 Ma (400,000 years). The only active volcanism in the last 200 years has been on Hawaiʻi and on the submerged but growing volcano to the extreme southeast, Kamaʻehuakanaloa (formerly Loʻihi).

Almost all of the magma of the hotspot has the composition of basalt, and so the Hawaiian volcanoes are composed almost entirely of this igneous rock. There is very little coarser-grained gabbro and diabase. Nephelinite is exposed on the islands but is extremely rare. The majority of eruptions in Hawaiʻi are Hawaiian-type eruptions because basaltic magma is relatively fluid compared with magmas typically involved in more explosive eruptions, such as the andesitic magmas that produce some of the spectacular and dangerous eruptions around the margins of the Pacific basin.
