= Intrusive Suite of Yosemite Valley =

Geological formation in Yosemite National Park, USA

The Intrusive Suite of Yosemite Valley is indicated in yellow

The Intrusive Suite of Yosemite Valley (see Yosemite Valley) is one of several intrusive suites in Yosemite National Park. These also include

1. Fine Gold Intrusive Suite
2. Intrusive Suite of Buena Vista Crest
3. Intrusive Suite of Jack Main Canyon
4. Intrusive Suite of Merced Peak
5. Intrusive Suite of Sonora Pass
6. Tuolumne Intrusive Suite
7. Johnson Granite Porphyry

It is an intrusive suite composed mainly of granitic rocks, which near the metasedimentary pendant have locally mingled with granitic to gabbroic compositions.

== External links and references ==
- Geology and geochemistry of mafic to felsic plutonic rocks in the Cretaceous intrusive suite of Yosemite Valley, California
