= Sierra Nevada–Great Valley Block =

Geologic feature in California, United States

The Sierra Nevada–Great Valley Block (SNGV) is a section of the Earth's crust in California, United States, encompassing most of the region east of the Great Valley fault system which runs along the eastern foot of the Coast Ranges, and west of the Sierra Nevada Fault which runs along the foot of the Sierra Nevada's eastern scarp. To the south, the block is bounded by the Garlock Fault. The northern bound is not well defined at present, but generally runs along a line extending across the northern Sacramento Valley.

The SNGV has been found to behave like a rigid body relative to the North American plate to which it is somewhat loosely attached; for this reason it is sometimes referred to as Sierra Nevada microplate. The block moves in a northwest direction at approximately 12 mm per year while the rest of the North American plate is moving in a southwest direction. In far northern California, this produces a zone of convergence which has resulted in the compressive uplift of the Coast Ranges.

At its core, the SNGV block consists primarily of the Sierra Nevada batholith which has been tilted westward like a large trapdoor with its "hinge" lying deep beneath the sediments which fill California's Central Valley. This tilt is attributed to the buoyancy of the eastern part of the block due to the greater subterranean heat associated with the tectonics of the adjacent Great Basin, compounded by the weight of sediments accumulating over the western portion of the block.

A major feature of the block clearly visible from space and on topographical maps is the Kern Canyon Fault which is regarded as a fracture resulting from differences in the stresses affecting the southern section of the block.

== See also ==
- Smartville Block – plate tectonics oceanic terrane in northern section.
