= Geology of Macau =

The geology of Macau includes rocks from the Paleoproterozoic and Mesozoic belonging to the Yangtze terrane and Cathaysia terrane, which joined to the form the basement rock of southern China. The Yuao-Macao Fault Zone was identified in 1992 as a component of the broader South China Fold Belt, together with the Jiangshan-Shaoxing Fault Zone.

I-type granite intrusion took place in the region around 160 million years ago in the Mesozoic. As a result, the rock in Macau is dominantly granite with veins and dikes of dacite, basalt and aplite. Geologists distinguish different granite facies between Coloane, Taipa and the Macau Peninsula. Other rock groups include porphyritic biotite granite, non-porphyritic garnet-bearing biotite granites and smaller occurrences of granite without biotite. Isotopic data suggests origins melting of Proterozoic protoliths, with small amounts of mantle-derived magma added to the mix.
