= Tuolumne Intrusive Suite =

One of several intrusive suites in Yosemite National Park

- Stratigraphic range: Late Cretaceous, 91–82 Ma
- Type: Suite

Lithology
- Primary: Granodiorite

Location
- Region: Yosemite National Park
- Country: United States

Type section
- Named for: Tuolumne Meadows
- The Tuolumne Intrusive Suite contains the words Yosemite National Park

The Tuolumne Intrusive Suite is the youngest and most extensive of the intrusive suites of Yosemite National Park, and also comprises about 1/3 of the park's area. The Suite includes Half Dome Granodiorite, Cathedral Peak Granite, and Kuna Crest Granodiorite.

The largest pluton of the Tuolumne Intrusive Suite is Cathedral Peak Granodiorite, which extends long distances both the north and south of Tuolumne Meadows. The southwestern part of the Tuolumne Intrusive Suite is made up of Half Dome Granodiorite. The youngest, smallest, and most central rock body is of the Johnson Granite Porphyry

== Age ==
From oldest to youngest, the rock units are

1. Kuna Crest Granodiorite 91-88 Ma
2. Half Dome Granodiorite 85–83.4 Ma
3. Cathedral Peak Granodiorite 83.7 Ma
4. Johnson Granite Porphyry 82.4 Ma

== See also ==
- Fine Gold Intrusive Suite
- Intrusive Suite of Buena Vista Crest
- Intrusive Suite of Merced Peak
- Intrusive Suite of Sonora Pass
- Intrusive Suite of Yosemite Valley
- Johnson Granite Porphyry
