= Sierran Arc =

In early Triassic time, an extensive volcanic arc system called the Sierran Arc began to develop along the western margin of the North American continent. In Southern California, this volcanic arc would develop throughout the Mesozoic Era to become the geologic regions known as the Sierra Nevada Batholith, the Peninsular Ranges Batholith, (in the Peninsular Ranges), and other plutonic and volcanic centers throughout the greater Mojave Desert region.

== Geology ==
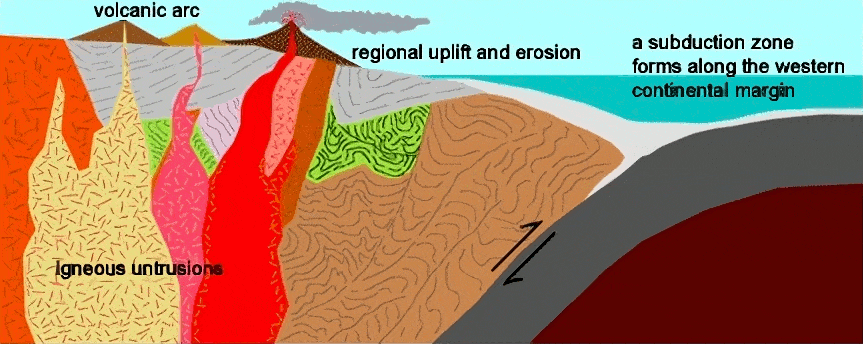
Plate convergence along the continental margin produced a volcanic arc system throughout the Sierra Nevada and Mojave region roughly 250 million to about 60 million years ago.

These massive belts of plutonic (intrusive) and volcanic (extrusive) regional belts and isolated centers developed as plate convergence and subduction took place farther west along the western continental margin. These igneous provinces shed vast quantities of sediment both eastward into the Western Interior Seaway and westward into Pacific margin basin. At the same time, older sedimentary materials and rocks were subjected to regional metamorphism throughout much of Baja and Southern California. In the region today, granitic rocks of Mesozoic age dominate the bedrock exposed in the Peninsular Ranges, western Transverse Range, the southern Sierra Nevada, and the greater Mojave region.

Although igneous activity in the Southern California region was ongoing throughout the Mesozoic Era, the peak of the plutonism in the southern Sierra Nevada region was in the Late Cretaceous, about 100 to 80 million years ago. In addition, thick sequences (accumulations) of Mesozoic-age sedimentary rocks, mostly marine shales and sandstone of Jurassic and Cretaceous age, are locally preserved along the western side of the Peninsular Ranges and throughout the western Transverse Ranges in parts of the Santa Monica Mountains and mountainous Los Padres National Forest region north of Santa Barbara, California. A thick sequence of terrestrial sedimentary rocks are also preserved in the McCoy Mountains region near Blythe, California. Except for the sedimentary rocks mentioned above, most of the Mesozoic-age rocks in preserved in Southern California display intermediate to high grades of metamorphism, typical of material that may have been buried to mid-crustal depths (probably in a range of 10 to 20 kilometers). Although the region was no doubt extensively covered with terrestrial and marine sedimentary deposits that interfingered volcanic deposits from the volcanic centers, most of this material was stripped away by erosion following regional uplift that continued into the following Cenozoic Era.

== See also ==
- Nevadan orogeny
