= Sierra Nevada Fault =

Seismic fault in California, United States

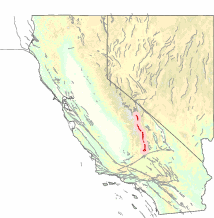
The Sierra Nevada Fault Zone

The Sierra Nevada Fault is an active seismic fault along the eastern edge of the Sierra Nevada mountain block in California. It forms the eastern escarpment of the Sierra Nevada, extending roughly 600 km (370 mi) from just north of the Garlock Fault to the Cascade Range.

== Tectonic activity ==
Uplift on this fault is about 0.01–0.03 mm per year. This movement, combined with the activity of the adjacent Owens Valley and Lone Pine faults, is responsible for the continuing rise of the Sierra Nevada Mountains. No large earthquake has been reported on this fault in recorded history. The largest earthquake in its vicinity was the 1872 Owens Valley earthquake, which was on the adjacent Owens Valley Fault and had an estimated moment magnitude of 7.4–7.9.

== History ==
Around 200 million years ago, the ancient oceanic Farallon plate began to subduct beneath the North American plate. As the Farallon moved eastward, it was overridden by the North American, and the moisture within it was figuratively baked out of the rock before the crust melted into magma. As it began to cool, a large mass of igneous rock was created and is now visible as the granite domes of the Sierra Nevada Batholith. Batholiths are large masses of igneous rock that form deep below the surface, and they are thought to be the "roots" of subduction-zone volcanoes. After the below-surface formation of the granite, processes such as uplift and erosion eventually expose it to the surface.

== Mechanics and processes ==
There are several contributors to the uplift of the Sierra Nevada Batholith. Shear forces replace compression as the North American plate begins riding over with the Pacific plate. On the other side of the Sierra Nevada Range, the Basin and Range Province is pulled apart as the force of compression increases. It is the Farallon plate subsidence which is thought to be the force behind the creation of the Sierra Nevada.
