= Sierra Nevada Batholith =

Batholith in the Sierra Nevada mountain range, United States

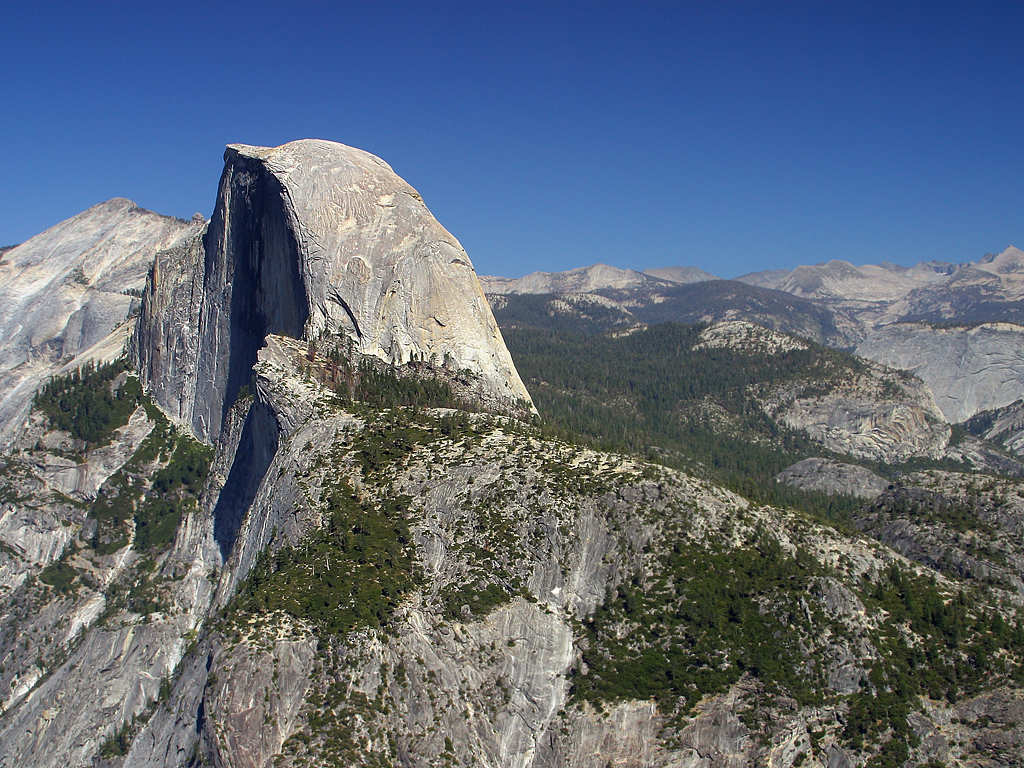
Half Dome, Yosemite, a classic granite dome of the Sierra Nevada Batholith

The Sierra Nevada Batholith is a large batholith that is approximately 400 miles long and 60-80 miles wide which forms the core of the Sierra Nevada mountain range in California, exposed at the surface as granite.

The batholith is composed of many individual masses of rock called plutons, which formed deep underground during separate episodes of magma intrusion, millions of years before the Sierra itself first began to rise. The extremely hot, relatively buoyant plutons, also called plutonic diapirs, intruded through denser, native country rock and sediments, never reaching the surface. At the same time, some magma managed to reach the surface as volcanic lava flows, but most of it cooled and hardened below the surface and remained buried for millions of years.

The batholith – the combined mass of subsurface plutons – became exposed as tectonic forces initiated the formation of the Basin and Range geologic province, including the Sierra Nevada. As the mountains rose, the forces of erosion eventually wore down the material which had covered the batholith for millions of years. The exposed portions of the batholith became the granite peaks of the High Sierra, including Mount Whitney, Half Dome and El Capitan. Most of the batholith, however, remains below the surface.

== Origins ==
The Sierra batholith was formed when the Farallon Plate subducted below the North American Plate. The resultant molten rock rose through the Earth's crust over the span of 100 Ma, forming several plutons, or a chain of volcanoes if the magma reached the surface. Most of the granitic rocks formed between 105 and 85 Ma, during the Cretaceous, with pluton formation ending around about 70 Ma. Erosion from 85 until 15 Ma removed the volcanic rocks and exposed the granitic core.

== Cooling and uplift ==
Around 80-76 million years ago, subduction beneath the Sierra Nevada batholith transitioned from steep-angle to shallow-angle. This shut down arc magmatism, moving the volcanic arc westward and leaving the Sierra Nevada block in a forearc setting. Apatite and Sphene fission track thermochronology done by Dumitru (1990) revealed a period of rapid decrease in geothermal gradient (>270 °C to <70 °C from 80Ma to 60-50Ma) as the block cooled, followed by a relatively stable period of subnormal geothermal gradients (5-15 °C/km) throughout the Cenozoic. Modeling of the rapid decrease in geothermal gradient returned a crude estimate of depth to the subducting plate of about 35–50 km, with a hard upper limit of 60 km. This is much shallower than the more typical ~120 km depth to the subducting plate in volcanic arc regimes.

Using data from his thermochronology analysis, Dumitru (1990) also constrained ages for the beginning of unroofing and uplift of the Sierra Nevada block to approximately 30-15Ma. Fission tracks – destructive remnants of radioactive decay in Uranium-bearing minerals – were shorter than expected in samples taken from several Sierra Nevada plutons. This implied a late-Cenozoic residency at depth, meaning the unroofing and uplift of the Sierra Nevada block happened rapidly near the end of the Cenozoic. Geologic evidence in the form of erosion surfaces, paleo-canyons, and related deposits suggests the majority of the uplift was achieved prior to 4-10Ma.

== Basement units ==
The plutons associated with the Sierra Nevada Batholith intruded into pre-existing rocks on the North American Continent. As the plutons intruded into these rocks, many were altered or metamorphosed. The "host rocks" include passive margin sequence units, deep water sediments, and shallow-water passive margin units. There are several locations that the contact between the granitic intrusions and the now metamorphosed sedimentary units can be seen. These unique contacts are called roof pendants.

== See also ==
- Geologic timeline of Western North America
- Bald Rock, California
- Sierra Nevada–Great Valley Block
- Sierran Arc
- Tuolumne Intrusive Suite
- Sentinel granodiorite
- Fine Gold Intrusive Suite
- Intrusive Suite of Yosemite Valley
