= Fine Gold Intrusive Suite =

Geologic formation that crosses into Yosemite National Park, California, United States

The Fine Gold Intrusive Suite is on and outside the map of Yosemite National Park

The Fine Gold Intrusive Suite is one of several intrusive suites that crosses into Yosemite National Park. These also include

1. Intrusive Suite of Buena Vista Crest
2. Intrusive Suite of Jack Main Canyon
3. Intrusive Suite of Merced Peak
4. Intrusive Suite of Sonora Pass
5. Intrusive Suite of Yosemite Valley
6. Tuolumne Intrusive Suite

The Fine Gold Intrusive Suite is an intrusive suite which is massive (more than 3100 square kilometers) and long-lived (ca. 19 million years).

== Where is intrudes ==
The Fine Gold Intrusive Suite intrudes both accreted oceanic terranes, and/or island-arc terranes, and, also continental crust.

== External links and references ==
- The Fine Gold Intrusive Suite: The roles of basement terranes and magma source development in the Early Cretaceous Sierra Nevada batholith
- A large article
