= Intrusive suite =

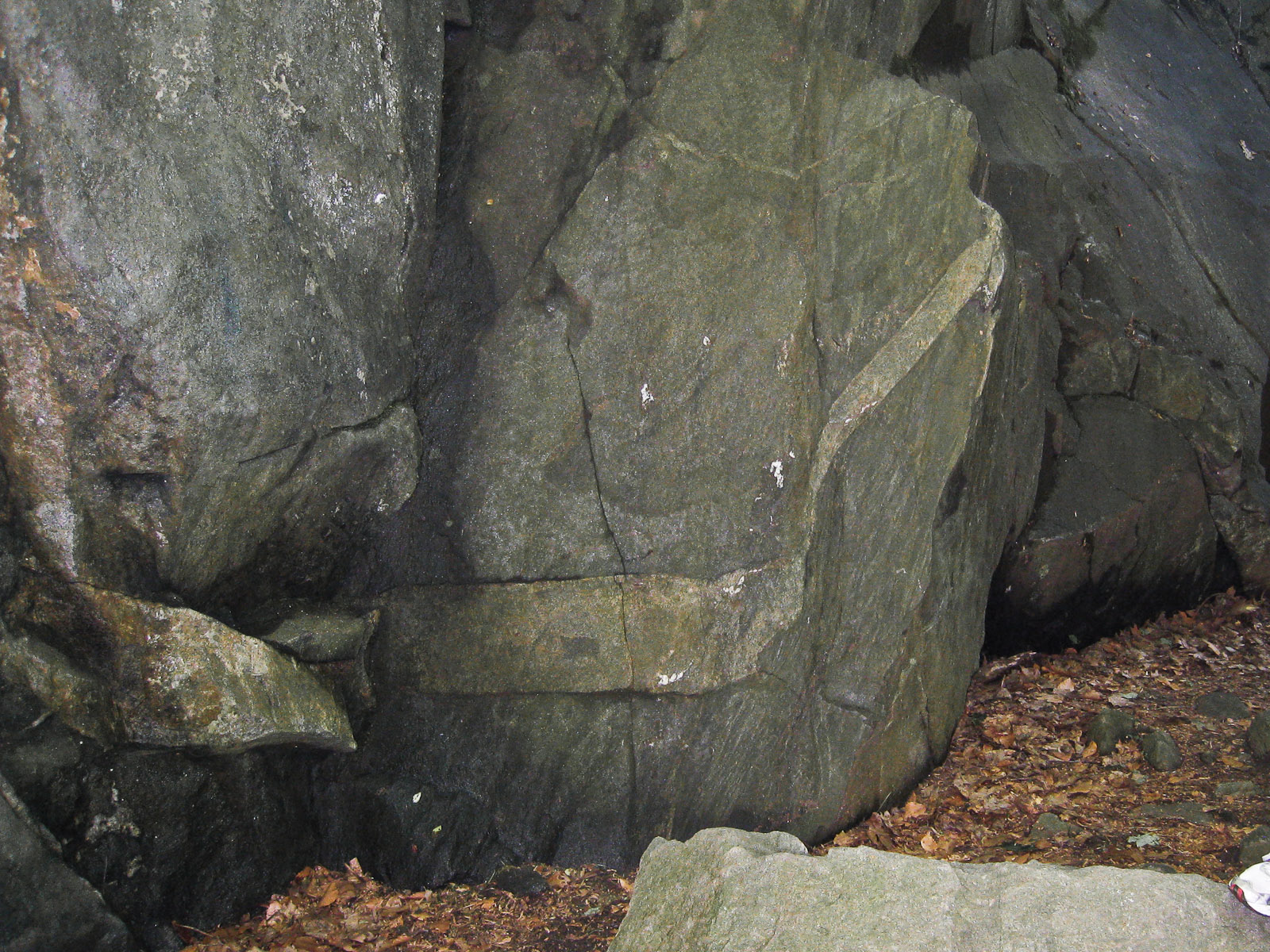
Georgetown Intrusive Suite, exposed in an old quarry south of Massachusetts Avenue in Rock Creek Park, near the border with Montrose Park, Washington DC

An intrusive suite is a group of igneous intrusions related in time and space. All rocks in an intrusive suite result from the same magma-producing event.

== See also ==
- Extrusive rock
